= Segler =

Segler is a surname of German origin. Notable people with the surname include:

- Burkhard Segler (born 1951), German footballer
- Olga Segler (1881–1961), German octogenarian woman who died while attempting to cross the Berlin Wall
