= Rudolf Urban =

Rudolf Urban is the name of the following persons:

- Rudolf Urban (soccer player) (born 1980), Slovak soccer player
- Rudolf Urban (Berlin Wall victim) (1914–1961)
