= Unternehmen Reisebüro =

The Unternehmen Reisebüro, also known as the Girrmann Group, was one of the first and most influential groups helping people escape from East Berlin during the Cold War. It was started by students from the Free University of Berlin, and located in the "House of the Future". The founders of the group were three law students, including Detlef Girrmann and Bodo Köhler. Their original purpose was to help people escaping East Berlin, soon after the Berlin Wall barbed wire went up. Their schemes included the use of West German passports to help similarly looking individuals escape. The group disbanded in 1963 after being infiltrated by the Stasi.

== Passports ==
They searched out passports from foreign embassies and private citizens that could be used to help those wishing to escape. These students faced the extreme challenge of evading the Stasi and its spies. The punishments for trying to "flee the republic" were harsh, but these students were adamant in their resolve, and exceptional at deceiving the Stasi.

It was of course not without danger for the runner, or for the potential escaper, for if the Stasi...got wind of it, then both would be arrested and tried, the one as the escape organizer, the other for 'fleeing the Republic'. And so every runner visiting an 'ex-student' had to have a harmless story ready, a reason why he was visiting, e.g. to ask whether the 'ex' wanted to give him a final term paper, or whether the 'ex' could, despite everything, come to the West of the city for a meeting with their professor. The fake story had to be absolutely credible, but also sufficiently harmless, so that the runner looked at worst like a well-meaning idiot and never as a 'criminal' (in the East's jargon). Only when you were certain that no unwanted other was listening in, or the runner could be sure that the 'ex' was 'safe', e.g. not a spy or someone who had meanwhile been 'turned' by the Stasi, only then could you go very cautiously to the next stage...

They would fake the passport, and then create a history for those who would use it. The creation of a personal history was no easy task, it included hours of memorizing stories, learning phrases in their "native" languages, and general knowledge of their "homeland" in order to deceive any difficult questions border guards could ask. This method worked well until the Stasi became suspicious (or were tipped off by a spy) and border guards began inserting cards into passports for anyone who crossed over during the day. Without one of these cards it was impossible to cross to the West side. This practice effectively stemmed the escape attempts using passports, but passports were not the only way to escape.

== Sewer system ==
The sewer system was created before the Soviet occupation, and as such had no barriers between East and West. The first major attempt to use the sewers was not made by the Girrmann group, but instead a group of West Berlin high school seniors likewise attempting to free their school friends.

After their apparent success the Girrmann group commandeered the path and refined the process with professionalism. They executed a complicated plan that included two students, Dieter Wohlfahrt and a student codenamed 'Langer' (tall in German). 'Langer' would ride a Vespa to the East, and Wohlfahrt would drive a vehicle over the top of the manhole cover (to conceal the activity below). They then together would remove the manhole cover and wait for the first groups assigned to come. After the first group entered into the sewers, 'Langer' would ride back to West Berlin and inform them that the first group was on the way. After the last group and a few extra minutes for latecomers, Wohlfahrt would close the sewer cover and drive back to West Berlin. This plan was effective, efficient, and simple. The West German senator Lipschitz provided the volunteers with the same wading boots that the Berlin department of sanitation used for working in the sewers.

Like the plan with the passport, this plan ended prematurely on the fifth night of operation on October 12, 1961. Around midnight an unfamiliar vehicle raced toward the last man. The vehicle abruptly stopped and armed Vopos exited the car and began searching all of the manholes. Luckily everyone escaped without any casualties or wounds. However, the Vopos replaced the sewer covers with hacksaw-proof covers shortly after this incident.

== Afterwards ==
The Girrmann Group faded out after the sewers, but they were possibly the most successful organization at helping East Berliners escape with roughly 5,000 reported successful attempts in 1961 alone.
