= Christian-Peter Friese =

One of the victim at the Berlin Wall

Christian-Peter Friese (August 5, 1948, Munich - December 25, 1970, East Berlin) was one of the victims at the Berlin Wall. Members of the Border Troops of the German Democratic Republic shot him while trying to escape from East Germany.

== Biography ==
He was his mother's only child, and grew up with her in Naumburg. His father is unknown. After school, he trained as a car mechanic. In Naumburg he took a job at the Deutsche Reichsbahn (East Germany).

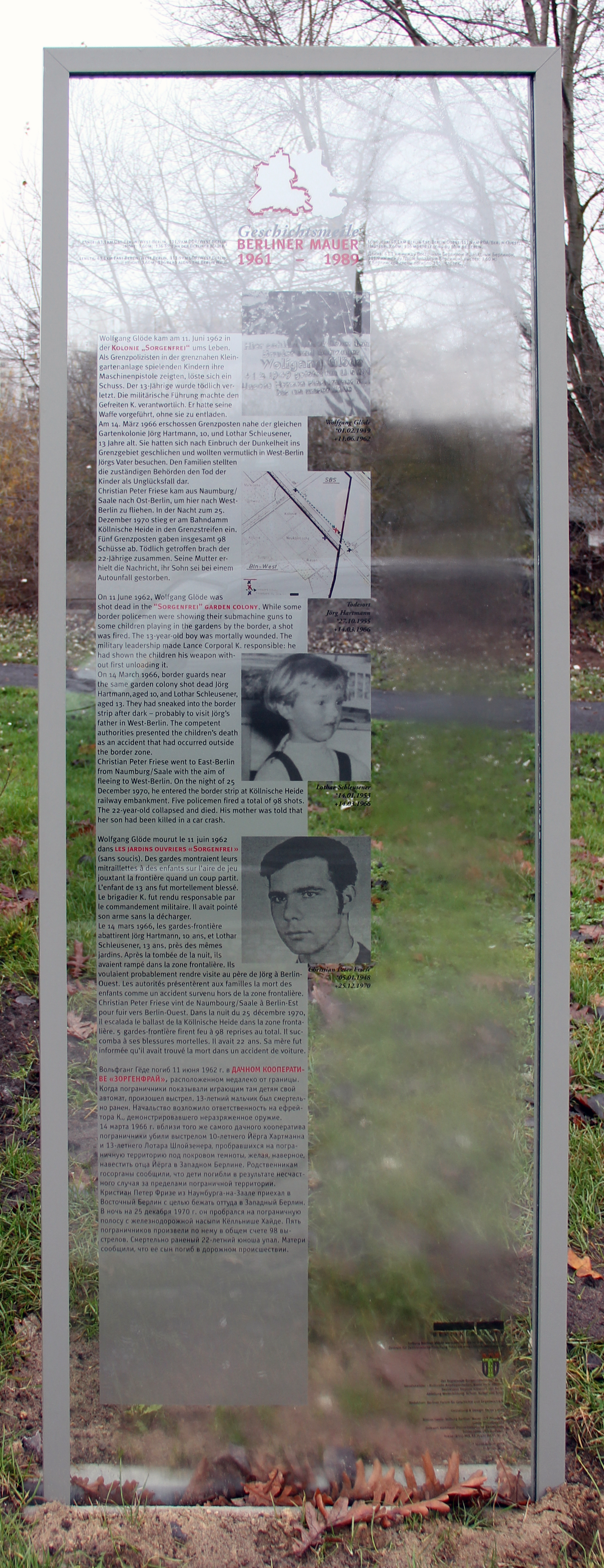
Memorial Plaque at Kiefholzstraße 100, Berlin-Plänterwald commemorating Christian-Peter Friese, along with Wolfgang Glöde and Jörg Hartmann

== Death ==
On the evening of December 24, 1970, he left his home and his mother without saying goodbye or leaving a message. He went to East Berlin by train. Once there he went to the allotment Vogelsang II in Treptow which was right on the border. He watched the border and climbed around midnight on the interior fence. He triggered alarm by touching the subsequent signal fence. A total of five border guards opened fire on Christian-Peter Friese, who took cover in the vehicle barrier ditch. Shortly afterwards Friese began again to run in the direction of the last border fence. He was hit several times in the legs and upper body. He succumbed to his injuries in the death strip. In the crime scene sketch of the files of the Stasi were recorded a total of 98 shots on Christian-Peter Friese.

== Aftermath ==
A senate speaker and the American City Commandant expressed their protest over the incident. The West-Berlin police initiated an investigation.

The mother of the deceased was informed on January 7, 1971, by members of the Stasi about the death. The legend was that Christian-Peter Friese was traveling by car into a tree. The body had been cremated. The urn was transferred one month later to Naumburg and buried there in the municipal cemetery, under the supervision of the Stasi.

After the German reunification, the mother said to Naumburg police that her son revealed his intention of fleeing. In a Mauerschützenprozess (process against guards of the wall who had shot) the border guards involved were acquitted because intent to kill could not be established, and because the court could not determine which of the defendants was responsible for the actual killing.

== See also ==
- List of deaths at the Berlin Wall
- Berlin Crisis of 1961
