= List of deaths at the Berlin Wall =

List of deaths which occurred at the Berlin Wall

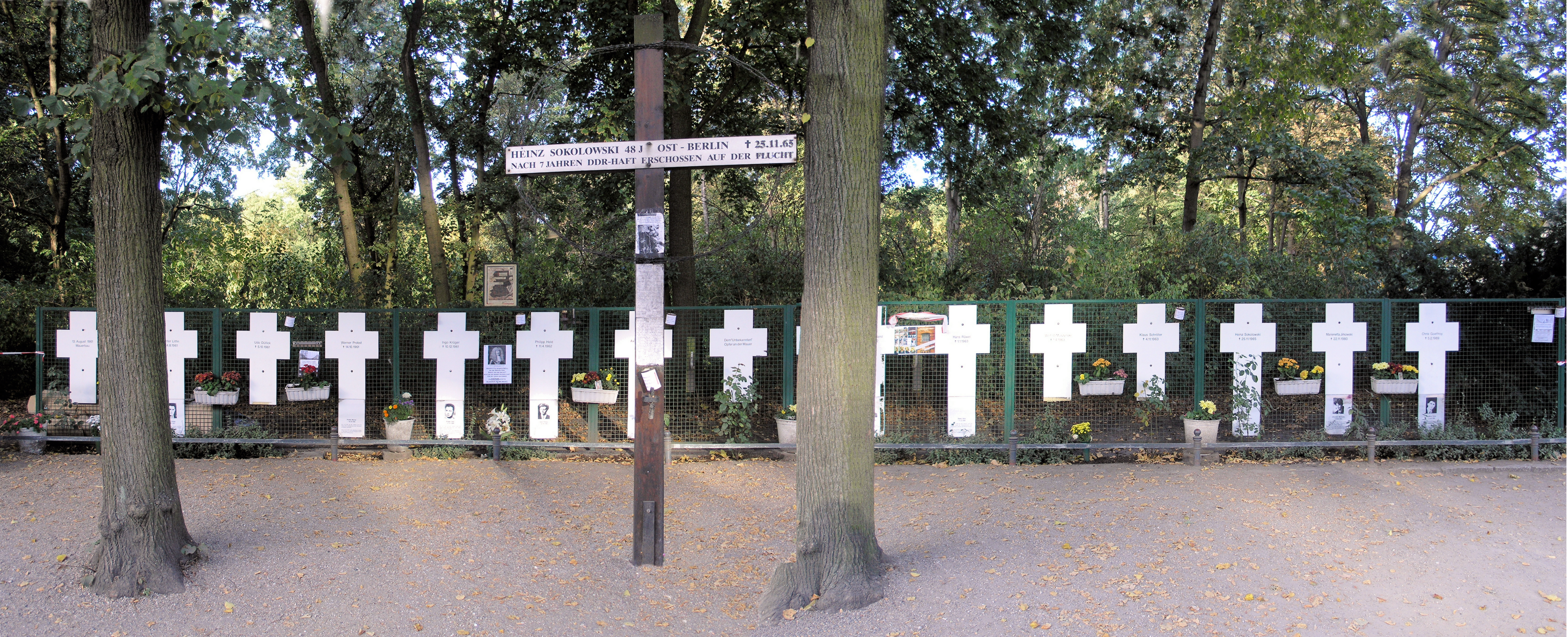
One of many memorials to those who died at the Berlin Wall

There were numerous deaths at the Berlin Wall, which stood as a barrier between West Berlin and East Berlin from 13 August 1961 until 9 November 1989. Before the construction of the Berlin Wall in 1961, 3.5 million East Germans circumvented Eastern Bloc emigration restrictions, many by crossing over the border from East Berlin into West Berlin. From there they could then travel to West Germany and other Western European countries. Between 1961 and 1989, the Wall prevented almost all such emigration.

The state-funded Centre for Contemporary History (ZZF) in Potsdam has confirmed that "at least 140 people were killed at the Berlin Wall or died under circumstances directly connected with the GDR border regime", including people attempting to escape, border guards, and innocent parties; however, researchers at the Checkpoint Charlie Museum have estimated the death toll to be significantly higher.

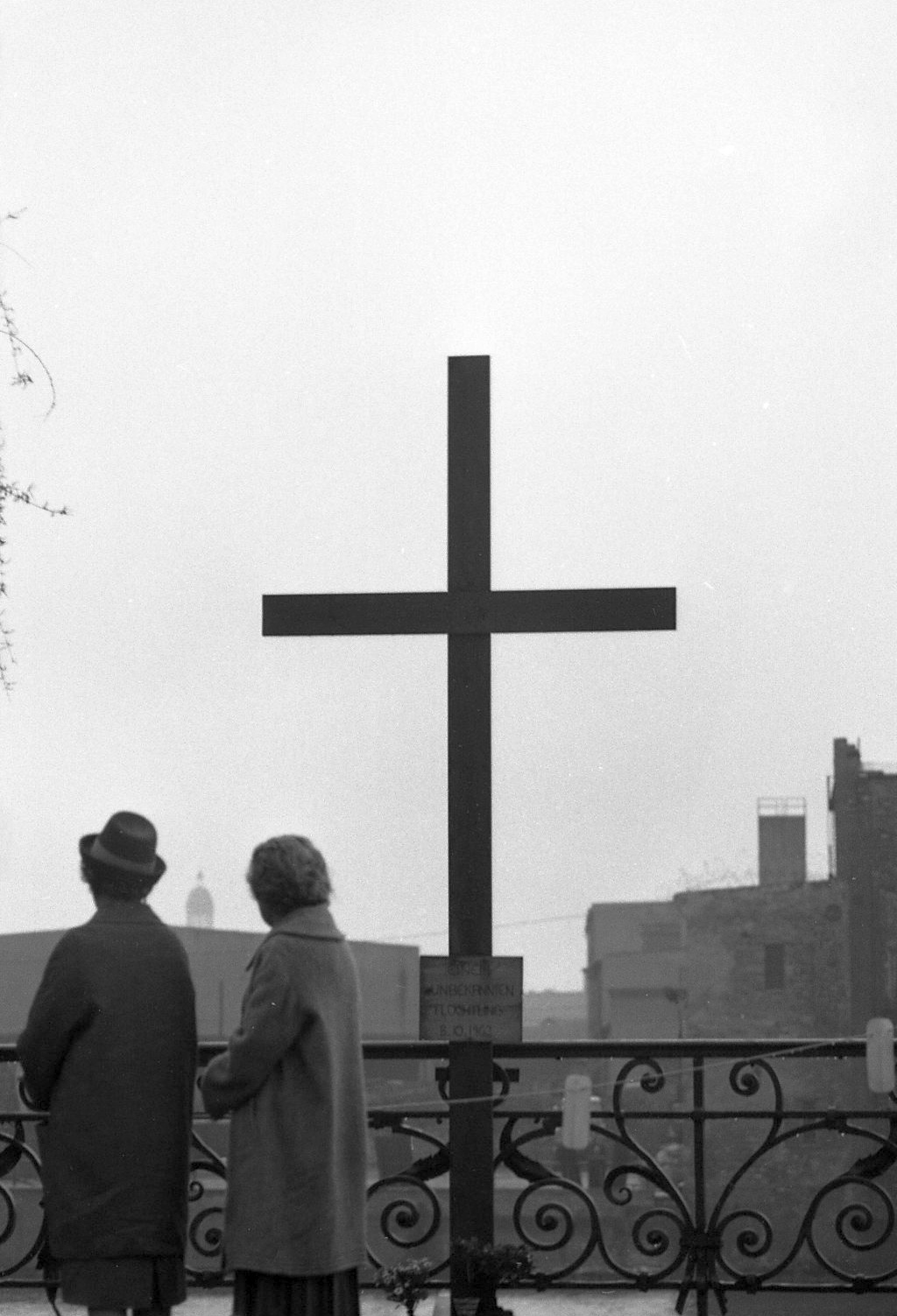
Memorial for an unknown refugee, Berlin 1962

Escape attempts claimed the lives of many, from a child as young as one to an 80-year-old woman, and many died because of the accidental or illegal actions of the guards. In numerous legal cases throughout the 1990s, several border guards, along with political officials responsible for the defence policies, were found guilty of manslaughter and served probation or were jailed for their role in the Berlin Wall deaths.

== Background ==
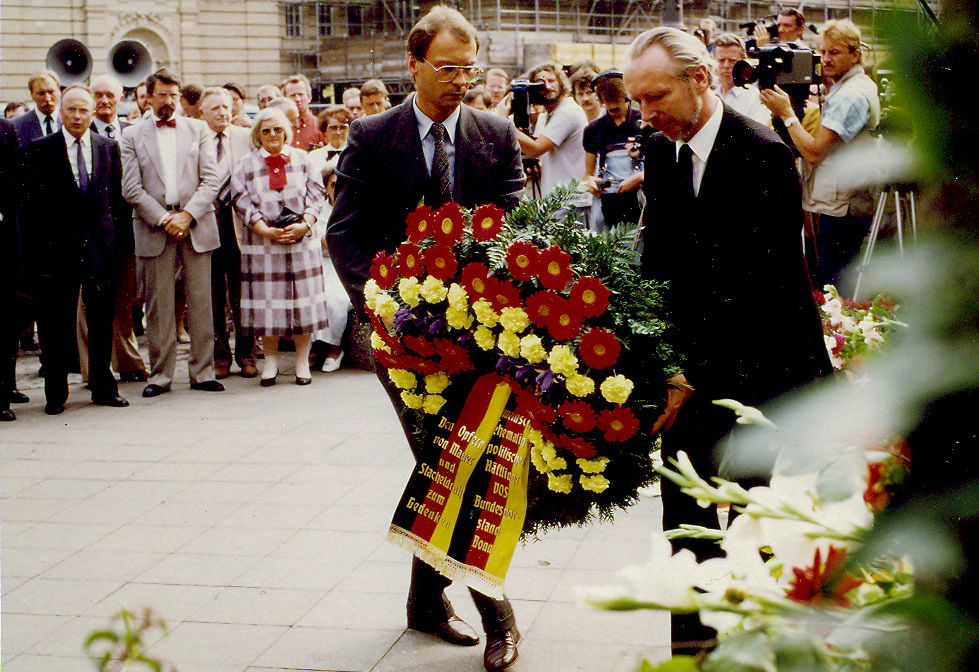
Wreath laying at the 25^{th} anniversary of the Berlin Wall in 1986.

The Berlin Wall was constructed during the Cold War. East Germany sought to cut down on emigration to the Western Bloc (Republikflucht, lit. transl. Republic Flight). During the night of 12 to 13 August 1961 the National People's Army, the German Border Police, the Volkspolizei, and the Combat Groups of the Working Class locked down passage between East Berlin and West Berlin; construction of the Berlin Wall and its related facilities began. Emigrants ran the risk of being detected by soldiers monitoring the wall who were given orders to shoot "defectors". Restrictions on passage would last until November 1989, and the Wall itself was torn down in 1990–1994 as a result of German reunification.

== Identifying the death toll ==
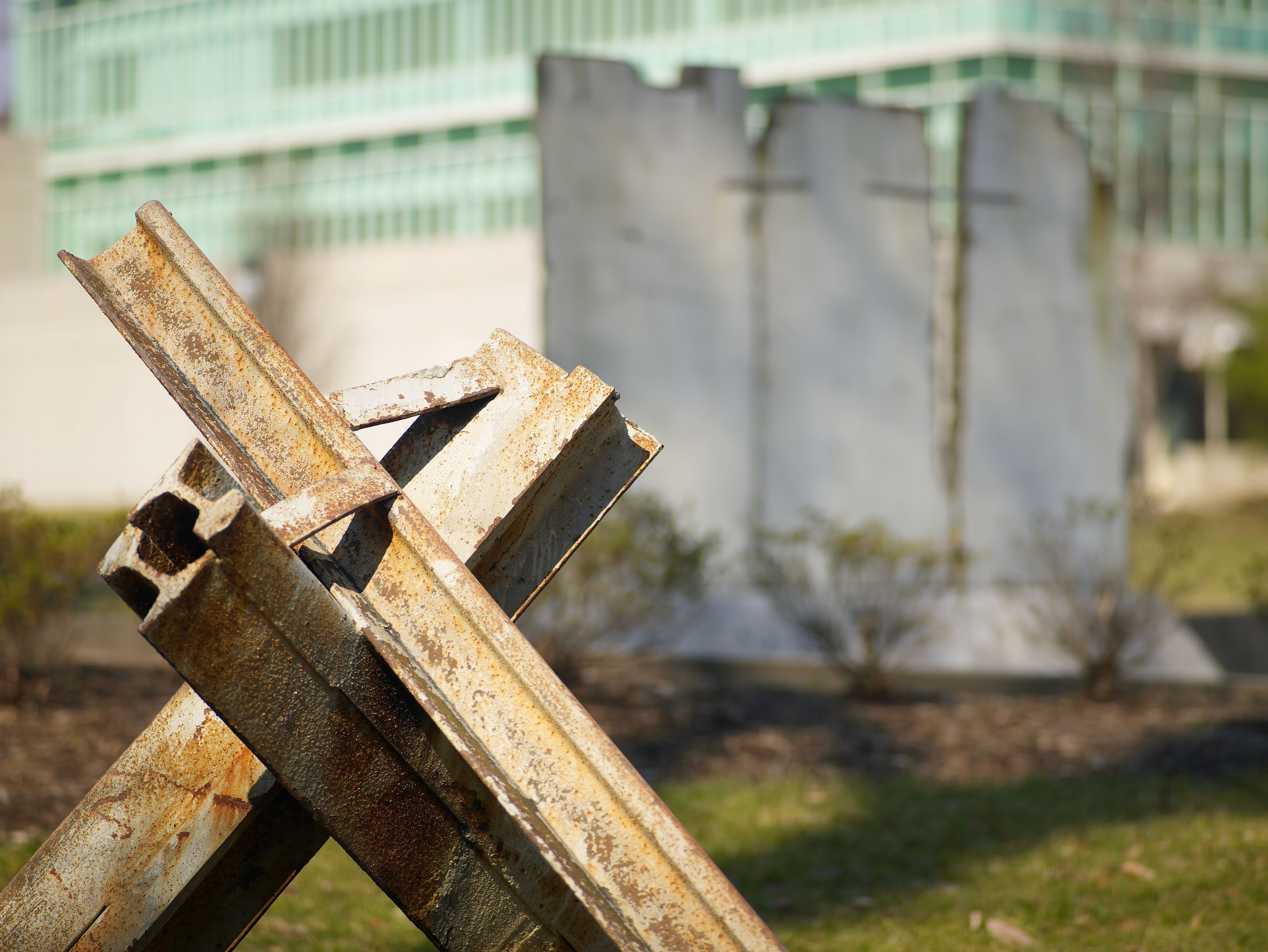
Monument to the Berlin Wall with part of the concrete wall in the background

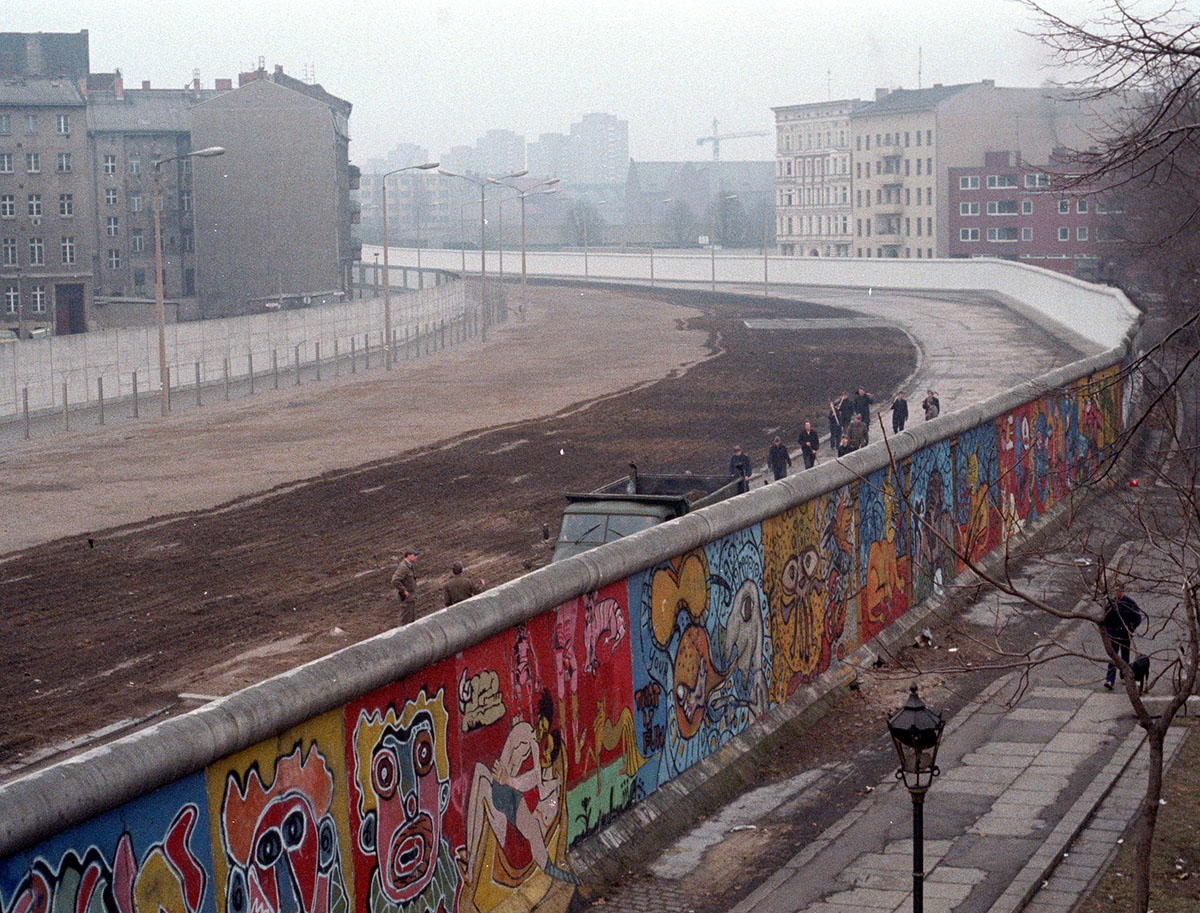
A section of the Berlin Wall in 1986

Identifying deaths specifically attributable to the Berlin Wall is not straightforward. Although East Germans were aware of deaths on the Wall from West German media broadcasts which they were able to receive, reliable information was closely held by the East German authorities. A number of different West German institutions kept their own records. These included the West Berlin police, the Central Registry of State Judicial Administrations in Salzgitter (which tracked all border fatalities) and the Arbeitsgruppe 13 August (Working Group 13 August), a West Berlin association. Within the jurisdiction of the West-Berlin police, the State Security Department was responsible for the registration of known incidents. The records distinguish between individuals who died at the outer border of West-Berlin (80 incidents), unclear incidents (with 5 possible wall victims) and border guards who were shot. The Central Registry of State Judicial Administrations in Salzgitter, was also given a mandate to collect evidence of actual or attempted murder in the GDR. In 1991, it published the "Salzgitter-Report" with the names of 78 victims. However, since the Registration Agency had no access to the GDR archives, the data was regarded as incomplete. Both agencies mainly listed incidents that could have been observed from West-Berlin or had been reported by fugitives or border patrols who left the GDR.

After the fall of the Wall, criminal investigations into border killings were launched by the Zentrale Ermittlungsstelle für Regierungs- und Vereinigungskriminalität (ZERV) and the Berlin public prosecutor's office. Each of these institutions used different criteria to count deaths. In 2000, the ZERV compared data from the central registration office in Salzgitter with findings in GDR archives and made a total of 122 cases of targeted killing by GDR state organs at the border to West-Berlin. This list was a pre-inquiry for the prosecution departments of Berlin and Neuruppin, which in turn gave attention to legal processing. The Salzgitter registry recorded incidents in which "suspicion of a criminal act was justified", while the Arbeitsgruppe 13 August, which also manages the house at Checkpoint Charlie and is run by the artist Alexandra Hildebrandt, widow of the founder Rainer Hildebrandt, counted "all victims who died in connection with flight and/or the border regime", including deaths by accidents or drowning, or deaths of border soldiers and policemen in suicides or firearms accidents. This gave them the figure of 235 deaths compared to the significantly lower number of 78 according to the Salzgitter registry.

The results, which are described as "temporary" by the working group, are regularly presented at press conferences on 13 August. The list is consistently revised with new cases being included and old ones abandoned. The Checkpoint Charlie Museum gives the number at 245 deaths, though this includes suicides by border guards and bodies found in the water even when there was no obvious link to them being an escapee. They also state that the first person to die at the Wall was in fact an East German officer who committed suicide.

In 2005, the Gedenkstätte Berliner Mauer (Centre for Contemporary History and the Berlin Wall Memorial Site and Documentation Centre) established a research project to definitively "establish the number and identities of the individuals who died at the Berlin Wall between 1961 and 1989 and to document their lives and deaths through historical and biographical research". The project was funded by the Federal Agency for Civic Education, Deutschlandradio and the Federal Commissioner of Culture and Media. The results were published on the website www.chronik-der-mauer.de and in a book titled "Todesopfer an der Berliner Mauer" (2009). The project outlines the victims' biographies, the causes of death and the sources that were used. At the time, no reliable or official information was available about the number of fatalities at the Wall. The project found that 136 people had died, using the criteria of "either an attempted escape or a temporal and spatial link between the death and the border regime". Not all had died immediately—one fatality occurred years later—and not all were caused by acts of violence. After reviewing 575 deaths, the project team found that at least 140 people died in shootings, were killed in accidents or committed suicide after failing to cross the Wall.

== Criteria ==
Every investigation committee had its own criteria of which cases could be counted as wall victims. The ZERV investigations focused on a working legal guilt, while the ZZF and the Arbeitsgemeinschaft 13. August developed their own criteria that went beyond purely legal guilt. The ZZF criteria required the victim to have a background for the attempted escape or to have both a temporal and a spatial connection to the border regime. Five groups were developed from the examined cases:

- Fugitives shot and killed or fatally injured by East German security forces while trying to cross the Wall;
- Fugitives who died while attempting to cross the Wall, or who committed suicide when their attempt failed, or who suffered fatal injuries in the course of their attempt;
- People from East and West who were shot and killed or fatally injured by East German security forces;
- People from East and West who died or were fatally injured as a result of the actions or inaction of the East German security forces;
- Members of the East German border troops who were killed or suffered fatal injuries while on duty.

The definition coined by the Arbeitsgruppe 13 August reaches further. It includes border guards that committed suicide and cold cases involving bodies found in boundary waters.

However, a thorough investigation of all natural cases of death has not been completed yet. One third of all files from the police of transport are gone, while entire annual reports of the 1970s are missing. Analyzing the daily records of border guards and examining activities in areas that had been under surveillance might have presented an alternative, but could not be realized due to financial issues. Another 16 cases of drowning could not definitively be connected to the Wall. Many other travellers from East and West Germanies and Czechoslovakia died immediately before, during or after passing through checkpoints in Berlin, with a published figure of 251 deaths—most were the result of cardiac arrest.

== Controversy about the number of casualties ==
The exact number of casualties is unknown. There are different numbers deriving from different investigations, each using its own definition of 'victim', making it difficult to compare their numbers. Moreover, in some cases investigations were interrupted, yielding only a provisional result. There is also a publicly held controversy between two groups regarding the number of victims. The opponents are the Arbeitsgemeinschaft 13. August and the ZZF. The former's numbers are higher, as they include, according to ZZF's Hans-Hermann Hertle, victims with an unclear or unsure connection to the border regime. After the ZZF published its interim results in August 2006, Alexandra Hildebrandt of the Arbeitsgemeinschaft has accused them of withholding numbers to invoke a more positive picture of East Germany. She argues that the ZZF project was funded by a coalition of social democrats and leftists. In 2008 the Arbeitsgemeinschaft claimed that since 1961 222 people had died because of the Berlin Wall. Hertle doubted these numbers, as they evidently included some survivors. As of 2006, 36 survivors were listed as deceased because of the Wall, and some victims were mentioned more than once. Because of these shortcomings, he assessed the list as an "extensive record of suspected cases" that "failed to set up a scientifically verifiable standard". Berlin's Governing Mayor Klaus Wowereit commented on the dispute with the words "Every single dead was one too many." In 2009, Hildebrandt reported of 245 dead caused by the Wall. According to her research, the first Wall victim was a suicidal GDR officer and not Ida Siekmann, as Hildebrandt also included border guards that committed suicide and cold cases of bodies found in boundary waters in her list. Another difference in Hertle's and Hildebrandt's list can be explained by the fact that Hertle had additional access to incomplete files from transport police. Therefore, their accounts vary in regard to the people that died of natural causes during border controls. Hurtle argues with a total of 251 of such cases, while Hildebrandt only compiled 38 of these cases.

Information on the dead can be found mainly in the administrative and military archives of West and East Germanies. However, the records of Stasi, which were administered by the Stasi federal commissioner, are not completely accessible. Some parts, especially from the later years, were destroyed when the ministry was disbanded, while some have not yet been sifted. Additionally, due to the Stasi records law, many records can only be looked at in the form of anonymized excerpts. An amendment from 2007 allows direct access to research projects, provided certain conditions are met. The East German Border Troop records are kept at the Bundeswehr archive, as the border troops were part of the East German National People Army. According to Hertle, when border troop, Stasi and the records from Western authorities are evaluated, one has to take into account the "values, interests and constraints of the record-keeping authorities and, by extension, of the respective power relations." The families of the victims can be another source, but were often fed with false information and therefore can only seldom answer questions regarding the events themselves.

== First and last deaths ==
When Berlin was a divided city, the Berlin Wall ran along Bernauer Straße. The street itself belonged to the French sector of West Berlin and the East German authorities declared that the windows and doors that led out onto Bernauer Straße should be bricked up. In the early morning of 22 August 1961, Ida Siekmann was the first of 98 people to die while attempting to escape. She was living on the fourth floor of number 48 (third floor, 3te Stock, by German standards), threw bedding and some possessions down onto the street, and jumped out of the window of her apartment. She fell on the sidewalk and was severely injured, dying shortly afterwards on her way to the Lazarus Hospital.

In February 1989, Chris Gueffroy was the last person shot trying to escape East Germany; he was not, however, the last to die escaping. On 8 March 1989, Winfried Freudenberg became the last person to die in an attempt to escape from East Germany to West Berlin. Freudenberg fell from a hot-air balloon while trying to fly over the Berlin Wall.

== Causes and periods of deaths ==
Berlin Wall

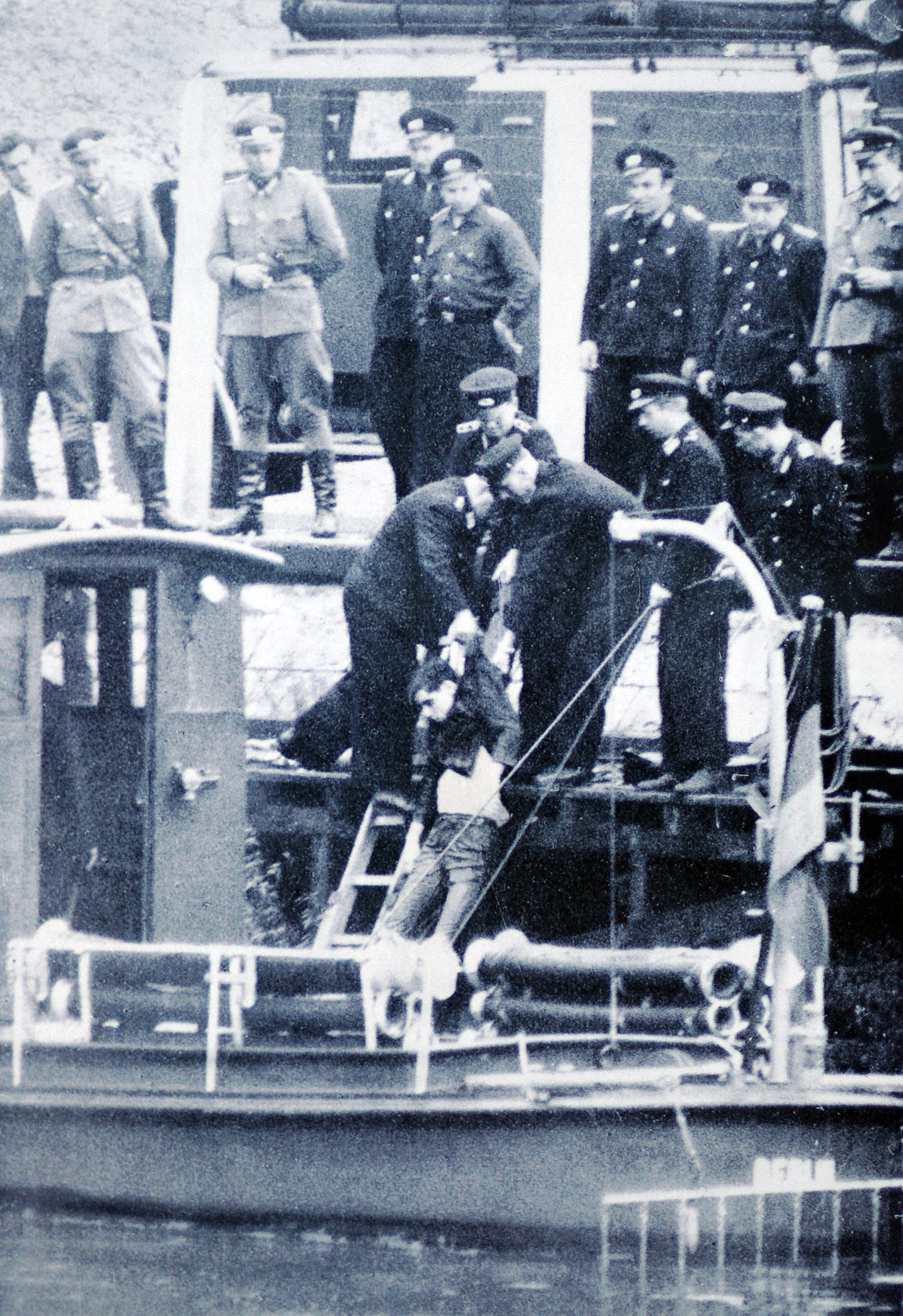
East German border guards retrieving the body of Günter Litfin from the River Spree

The Berlin Wall, like the much longer inner German border between East and West Germanies, was designed with two purposes in mind: to obstruct would-be border-crossers and to enable border guards to detect and stop illegal border crossings. In its final form, the 156 km (97 mi) wall consisted of inner and outer concrete walls separated by a "death strip" some 15 m (49 ft) to 150 m (490 ft) wide. It was guarded by around 11,500 Grenztruppen, the Border Troops of the German Democratic Republic who were authorised to use any means necessary, including firearms, to prevent border breaches. The shooting orders, or Schießbefehl, issued to the border guards instructed that people attempting to cross the Wall were criminals, and that the use of deadly force was required to deal with them: "Do not hesitate to use your firearm, not even when the border is breached in the company of women and children, which is a tactic the traitors have often used". Some guards have since claimed that the motto at the time was "a dead refugee is better than an escaped one". At first, wounded or shot refugees were left out in the open until they were removed, so that people from West Berlin and the western press could see them as well. After the reactions to the public death of Peter Fechter, border guards were ordered to move any casualties out of West Berlin's field of view. Negative reporting was sought to be prevented. Because of this, border guards often pulled people down into the car-moat that was part of the whole border security system. In some cases, the removal of the body was done only after nightfall.

The principal cause of death was shooting. Of the 140 fatalities, 99 (70.7%) were shot dead, not only escapees but also individuals on either side who were not attempting to escape, and East German border guards killed on duty. 101 of the fatalities were attempted border-crossers, of which all but three were East Germans (the exceptions were Franciszek Piesik and Czesław Kukuczka, Polish citizens, and Vladimir Ivanovich Odinzov, a Soviet soldier). 68 of them were killed in shootings. Another 30 people died as a result of shootings or fatal accidents sustained while in the vicinity of the Wall but not trying to cross it. Eight East German border soldiers were killed on duty by escapees, escape helpers, fellow soldiers, or the West Berlin police. Three people committed suicide after escape attempts failed.

About half of those who lost their lives on the Wall were killed in the first five years after it was originally installed. Death rates fell from then on, and took a particularly dramatic downturn after 1976. Nearly 86% of the Wall's victims, 120 people, died between 1961 and 1975; between 1976 and 1989 only 19 died. Several factors account for this reduction. The Wall became even more impregnable owing to technical improvements carried out in the mid-1970s and more restrictions were put on the area adjoining the Wall, making it more difficult to reach in the first place. The signing of the Helsinki Accords in 1975 led to new opportunities to cross the border legally, resulting in a rise in emigration applications and a corresponding fall in escape attempts.

== Locations, demographics and motivations of the victims ==
Map showing the location of the Berlin Wall and the legal crossing points in use from 1963

Around two-thirds of the victims were killed in inner Berlin, accounting for 93 of the 140. Berlin-Mitte and Treptow were the inner-city districts with the most fatalities; nearly half of the 64 escapees who died on the sector border lost their lives in those two districts. The remaining third died on the city's outskirts where the suburbs of West Berlin intersected with towns and villages in East Germany. Several victims, including most of the children, drowned in the Spree or the Havel.

Most of those who died (comprising 78% of the fugitive victims) were young men aged between 16 and 30. Married men accounted for 20% of the deaths while only 8 (6%) were women. Nine children younger than 16 years old died, whereas 94 victims were aged between 21 and 30. The overwhelming majority came from East Berlin and the surrounding area.

Their motives for escaping evolved over time. Those who fled in the years shortly after the Wall was built had experienced the formerly open border first-hand and often had relatives in the West or had traveled there. By contrast, later escapees had grown up with the closed border, desired greater freedom and were dissatisfied with conditions in East Germany. Their attempts to escape were often triggered by specific events such as a wish to avoid conscription, repression by the authorities or the refusal of a request to emigrate. Many escapees had previously clashed with the state authorities and had been imprisoned for political offenses, often related to earlier unsuccessful escape attempts.

== Deaths ==
The Centre for Contemporary History and the Berlin Wall Memorial Site and Documentation Centre identified 136 people who died at the Berlin Wall. They detailed the event surrounding each death, stating whenever possible the role of the person. This is listed here as:

- Escapee – a person who showed clear signs of attempting to escape
- No intention – a person who showed no obvious intent to cross the border
- Guard – a border guard on duty
- Suicide – a person who approached the guards with the intention of being killed

Note: Some deaths occurred days or even years after the event at the Berlin Wall, with the victims later dying in hospital.

Deaths
No.	Name	Date of birth	Date of death	Age	Role	Event details	Photograph
1	Ida Siekmann	23 Aug 1902	22 Aug 1961	58	Escapee	Died from internal injuries after jumping out of the window of her apartment at Bernauer Straße 48.	Memorial to Ida Siekmann
2	Günter Litfin	19 Jan 1937	24 Aug 1961	24	Escapee	Shot in Humboldt Harbour	Memorial to Günter Litfin
3	Roland Hoff	19 Mar 1934	29 Aug 1961	27	Escapee	Shot in the Teltow Canal	
4	Rudolf Urban	6 Jun 1914	17 Sep 1961	47	Escapee	Fell while climbing out of the window of his apartment at Bernauer Straße 1; died of pneumonia in the Lazarus hospital^{a}	
5	Olga Segler	31 Jul 1881	26 Sep 1961	80	Escapee	Jumped from her home at Bernauer Straße 34 and died a day later from internal injuries	Memorial to Olga Segler
6	Bernd Lünser	11 Mar 1939	4 Oct 1961	22	Escapee	Fell from the roof at Bernauer Straße 44 while fighting with GDR border patrol	Memorial to Bernd Lünser
7	Udo Düllick	8 Mar 1936	5 Oct 1961	25	Escapee	Drowned in the Spree	
8	Werner Probst	18 Jun 1936	14 Oct 1961	25	Escapee	Shot in the Spree	
9	Lothar Lehmann	28 Jan 1942	26 Nov 1961	19	Escapee	Drowned in the Havel	
10	Dieter Wohlfarth	27 May 1941	9 Dec 1961	20	Helper of escapees	Shot while helping others escape	Memorial to Dieter Wohlfahrt
11	Ingo Krüger	31 Jan 1940	10 Dec 1961	21	Escapee	Drowned in the Spree – defective diving equipment	
12	Georg Feldhahn	12 Aug 1941	19 Dec 1961	20	No intention	Drowned in the Spree after desertion; body found on 11 March 1962	
13	Dorit Schmiel	25 Apr 1941	19 Feb 1962	20	Escapee	Shot at Wilhelmsruher Damm at the sector border between Berlin-Pankow and Berlin-Reinickendorf	
14	Heinz Jercha	1 Jul 1934	27 Mar 1962	27	Helper of escapees	Shot at Heidelberger Strasse 75 at the sector border between Berlin-Treptow and Berlin-Neukölln	
15	Philipp Held	2 May 1942	Apr 1962	19	Escapee	Drowned in the Spree on or after 8 April; body found on 22 April	
16	Klaus Brueske	14 Sep 1938	18 Apr 1962	23	Escapee	Suffocated after crashing truck^{b}	
17	Peter Böhme	17 Aug 1942	18 Apr 1962	19	Escapee	Shot in a firefight	
18	Jörgen Schmidtchen	28 Jun 1941	18 Apr 1962	20	Guard	Shot by escapee Peter Bohme at Gleisdreieck Griebnitzsee on the outer ring between Potsdam-Babelsberg and Berlin-Zehlendorf	
19	Horst Frank	7 May 1942	29 Apr 1962	19	Escapee	Shot at the "Schönholz" garden settlement at the sector border between Berlin-Pankow and Berlin-Reinickendorf	
20	Peter Göring	28 Dec 1940	23 May 1962	21	Guard	Shot; stray bullet from West Berlin police	Newspaper story about Peter Göring
21	Lutz Haberlandt	29 Apr 1938	27 May 1962	24	Escapee	Shot while attempting to escape at the sector border south of the Sandkrug Bridge, near the Charité on Alexander's shore	
22	Axel Hannemann	27 Apr 1945	5 Jun 1962	17	Escapee	Shot in the Spree	
23	Erna Kelm	21 Jul 1908	11 Jun 1962	53	Escapee	Drowned in the Havel	
24	Wolfgang Glöde	1 Feb 1949	11 Jun 1962	13	No intention	Shot accidentally by a guard showing him his AK-47	
25	Reinhold Huhn	8 Mar 1942	18 Jun 1962	20	Guard	Shot by escapees	
26	Siegfried Noffke	9 Dec 1939	28 Jun 1962	22	Escapee	Shot as an escape helper at the sector border between the districts Mitte and Kreuzberg at Heinrich-Heine-Straße 49, after the local escape tunnel had been betrayed; died on the way to the East Berlin hospital	
27	Peter Fechter	14 Jan 1944	17 Aug 1962	18	Escapee	Shot while attempting to escape in Berlin-Mitte, Zimmerstraße; bled in the death strip before a large West Berlin crowd	Peter Fechter
28	Hans-Dieter Wesa	10 Jan 1943	23 Aug 1962	19	Escapee	Shot at the sector border in Gesundbrunnen at S-Bahn station Bornholmer Straße, while trying to escape; shot from close range when lying on the ground	
29	Ernst Mundt	2 Dec 1921	4 Sep 1962	40	Escapee	Shot while attempting to escape at the sector border at Sophienfriedhof, Bernauer Ecke Bergstraße	
30	Günter Seling	28 Apr 1940	30 Sep 1962	22	Guard	Border guardsman killed on-duty; shot dead by a comrade on the southwestern outer ring, either because of an accidental firing of his weapon or because Seling was misidentified as a GDR refugee	
31	Anton Walzer	27 Apr 1902	8 Oct 1962	60	Escapee	Shot while trying to escape at the sector border in the Spree near the Oberbaumbrücke	
32	Horst Plischke	12 Jul 1932	19 Nov 1962	30	Escapee	Drowned in the Spree; body found on 10 March 1963	
33	Otfried Reck	14 Dec 1944	27 Nov 1962	17	Escapee	Shot while fleeing border soldiers, who were pursuing him and his friend Gerd P. following their failed escape attempt; died three hours later in hospital	
34	Günter Wiedenhöft	14 Feb 1942	5 Dec 1962	20	Escapee	Drowned	
35	Hans Räwel	11 Dec 1942	1 Jan 1963	20	Escapee	Shot in the Spree	
36	Horst Kutscher	5 Jul 1931	15 Jan 1963	31	Escapee	Shot	
37	Peter Kreitlow	15 Jan 1943	24 Jan 1963	20	Escapee	Shot by Soviet troops	
38	Wolf-Olaf Muszynski	1 Feb 1947	February 1963/ March 1963	16	Escapee	Drowned in the Spree	
39	Peter Mädler	10 Jul 1943	26 Apr 1963	19	Escapee	Shot in the Teltow Canal	
40	Siegfried Widera	12 Feb 1941	8 Sep 1963	22	Guard	Bludgeoned with a metal rod on 23 August 1963	
41	Klaus Schröter	21 Feb 1940	4 Nov 1963	23	Escapee	Drowned in the Spree after being shot	
42	Dietmar Schulz	21 Oct 1939	25 Nov 1963	24	Escapee	Hit by a train	
43	Dieter Berger	27 Oct 1939	13 Dec 1963	24	No intention	Shot while drunkenly climbing the fence	
44	Paul Schultz	2 Oct 1945	25 Dec 1963	18	Escapee	Shot	
45	Walter Hayn	31 Jan 1939	27 Feb 1964	25	Escapee	Shot	
46	Adolf Philipp	13 Aug 1943	5 May 1964	20	No intention	Shot after threatening the border guards with a gun	
47	Walter Heike	20 Sep 1934	22 Jun 1964	29	Escapee	Shot	
48	Norbert Wolscht	27 October 1943	28 Jul 1964	20	Escapee	Drowned in the Havel	
49	Rainer Gneiser	10 Nov 1944	28 Jul 1964	19	Escapee	Drowned in the Havel	
50	Hildegard Trabant	12 Jun 1927	18 Aug 1964	37	Escapee	Shot while running away from the wall after a failed escape attempt	
51	Wernhard Mispelhorn	10 Nov 1945	20 Aug 1964	18	Escapee	Shot on 18 August 1964	
52	Egon Schultz	4 Jan 1943	5 Oct 1964	21	Guard	Shot accidentally in a firefight	Egon Schultz
53	Hans-Joachim Wolf	8 Aug 1944	26 Nov 1964	20	Escapee	Shot	
54	Joachim Mehr	3 Apr 1945	3 Dec 1964	19	Escapee	Shot	
55	Unidentified man	Unknown	19 Jan 1965	Unknown	Escapee	Drowned in the Spree	
56	Christian Buttkus	21 Feb 1944	4 Mar 1965	21	Escapee	Shot	
57	Ulrich Krzemien	13 Sep 1940	25 Mar 1965	24	West-East-Crossing	Escaped 1962, drowned in the Spree while crossing to East Berlin	
58	Hans-Peter Hauptmann	20 Mar 1939	3 May 1965	26	No intention	Shot on 25 April 1965 during an argument with border guards	
59	Hermann Döbler	28 Oct 1922	15 Jun 1965	42	No intention	Shot after unintentionally piloting his boat too close to the border along the Teltow Canal	
60	Klaus Kratzel	3 Mar 1940	8 Aug 1965	25	Escapee	Hit by a train	
61	Klaus Garten	19 Jul 1941	18 Aug 1965	24	Escapee	Shot	
62	Walter Kittel	21 May 1942	18 Oct 1965	23	Escapee	Shot after surrendering^{c}	
63	Heinz Cyrus	5 Jun 1936	11 Nov 1965	29	Escapee	Fell from the fourth floor of a building he had fled to	
64	Heinz Sokolowski	17 Dec 1917	25 Nov 1965	47	Escapee	Shot	Memorial to Heinz Sokolowski
65	Erich Kühn	27 Feb 1903	3 Dec 1965	62	Escapee	Peritonitis after being shot	
66	Heinz Schöneberger; Heinz Schöneberger	7 Jun 1938	26 Dec 1965	27	Escapee	Shot	
67	Dieter Brandes	23 Oct 1946	11 Jan 1966	19	Escapee	Circulatory failure after being shot on 9 June 1965	
68	Willi Block	5 Jun 1934	7 Feb 1966	31	Escapee	Shot	
69	Lothar Schleusener	14 Jan 1953	14 Mar 1966	13	Escapee	Shot	
70	Jörg Hartmann	27 Oct 1955	14 Mar 1966	10	Escapee	Shot	
71	Willi Marzahn	3 Jun 1944	19 Mar 1966	21	Escapee	Shot in a firefight at the boundary around Kohlhasenbrück/Steinstücken.	Memorial to Willi Marzahn
72	Eberhard Schulz	11 Mar 1946	30 Mar 1966	20	Escapee	Shot between Kleinmachnow and Königs Wusterhausen while attempting to escape; friend and co-refugee Dieter K. was arrested	
73	Michael Kollender^{d}	19 Feb 1945	25 Apr 1966	21	Escapee	Shot by the NVA soldiers after desertion attempt at the sector border in Johannisthal at the Teltowkanal; the shooters were acquitted by the reunified Germany, because desertion was a crime under the East German military law	
74	Paul Stretz	28 Feb 1935	29 Apr 1966	31	No intention	Shot while bathing in the Berlin-Spandau Ship Canal; had been drinking earlier in the evening	
75	Eduard Wroblewski	3 Mar 1933	26 Jul 1966	33	Escapee	Shot while trying to escape (under influence of alcohol) at the outer ring in Mahlow on the border to Lichtenrade near the former S-Bahn dam; he had managed to escape for the first time in 1952, but after nine months returned to the GDR	
76	Heinz Schmidt	26 Oct 1919	29 Aug 1966	46	No intention	Shot while bathing in the Berlin-Spandau Ship Canal	
77	Andreas Senk	1960	13 Sep 1966	6	No intention	Drowned in the Spree^{e}	
78	Karl-Heinz Kube	10 Apr 1949	16 Dec 1966	17	Escapee	Shot while trying to escape in Kleinmachnow near the Teltower harbor; the co-refugee was arrested	Memorial to Karl-Heinz Kube
79	Max Sahmland	28 Mar 1929	27 Jan 1967	37	Escapee	Shot; body discovered on 8 March 1967 after the boundary in Teltowkanal at Berlin-Rudow, which is located near to Kanalstraße in Höhe der Firma Eternit.	
80	Franciszek Piesik	23 Nov 1942	17 Oct 1967	24	Escapee (Polish citizen)	Drowned	
81	Elke Weckeiser	31 Oct 1945	18 Feb 1968	22	Escapee	Shot on 18 February 1968 at Reichstag	
82	Dieter Weckeiser	15 Feb 1943	19 Feb 1968	25	Escapee	Shot on 18 February 1968 while attempting to escape with Elke Weckeiser on the sector border opposite the Reichstag building near the Kronprinzenbrücke; died on 19 February 1968; had voluntarily entered the GDR with his first wife in 1962	
83	Herbert Mende	9 Feb 1939	10 Mar 1968	29	No intention	Shot on 7 July 1962 by the Potsdam Police near is the Glienicke Bridge^{f}; died 10 March 1968 from injuries sustained during shooting	
84	Bernd Lehmann	31 Jul 1949	28 May 1968	18	Escapee	Drowned in the Spree	
85	Siegfried Krug	22 Jul 1939	6 Jul 1968	28	No intention	Lived in West Germany and gained legal entry to East Berlin; shot while marching into the border zone and refusing to stop	
86	Horst Körner	12 Jul 1947	15 Nov 1968	21	Escapee	Shot at Klein-Glienicke/Schlosspark Babelsberg	
87	Rolf Henniger	30 Nov 1941	15 Nov 1968	26	Guard	Shot by escapee Horst Körner at Klein-Glienicke/Schlosspark Babelsberg	Rolf Henniger
88	Johannes Lange	17 Dec 1940	9 Apr 1969	28	Escapee	Shot near Adalbertstraße/Leuschnerdamm	
89	Klaus-Jürgen Kluge	25 Jul 1948	13 Sep 1969	21	Escapee	Shot near Helmut-Just-Brücke	
90	Leo Lis	10 May 1924	20 Sep 1969	45	Escapee	Shot near Nordbahnhof	
91	Eckhard Wehage	8 Jul 1948	10 Mar 1970	21	Escapee	Committed suicide after a failed attempt to flee the hijacking of an Interflug aircraft from East to West Berlin with his wife.^{g}	
92	Christel Wehage	15 Dec 1946	10 Mar 1970	23	Escapee	Committed suicide after a failed attempt to flee the hijacking of an Interflug aircraft from East to West Berlin with her husband.^{g}	
93	Heinz Müller	16 May 1943	19 Jun 1970	27	No intention	West German shot after having been arrested for unknown reasons from the West German side of the barrier at the sector border in Berlin-Friedrichshain near the Schilling Bridge	
94	Willi Born	19 Jul 1950	7 Jul 1970	19	Escapee	Suicide during failed escape attempt after he was found by border guards	
95	Friedhelm Ehrlich	11 Jul 1950	2 Aug 1970	20	No intention	A drunk Ehrlich entered the sector border area near the Leipziger Straße / Staerkstrasse at the outer ring in Glienicke / Nordbahn (circle Oranienburg) and whistled loudly. He was detained by guards and forced to lie face down in street. Ehrlich is then reported to have sat up and stretched his hand toward his hip pocket as though reaching for a weapon. He was shot by soldier; the bullet hit the main artery in Ehrlich's left thigh. First aid was not provided; Ehrlich died at the People's Police Hospital from exsanguination; Flight intent unclear	
96	Gerald Thiem	6 Sep 1928	7 Aug 1970	41	Unclear	For reasons unknown, he attempted to cross from West Berlin to East Berlin; was shot on the sector border between Neukölln and Treptow, Kiefholzstraße / Höhe Puderstraße, and died on the way to the East Berlin hospital	
97	Helmut Kliem	2 Jun 1939	13 Nov 1970	31	No intention	Accidentally approached the entrance to the border grounds on the outer ring in Falkensee, district Falkenhöh, near Pestalozzistraße; and was shot while retreating on his motorcycle; his passenger (also his brother) was injured but not charged with illegal border crossing	
98	Zock Hans-Joachim	26 Jan 1940	Nov 1970	30	Escapee	Drowned between 14 and 17 November 1970 in the Spree	
99	Christian-Peter Friese	5 Aug 1948	25 Dec 1970	22	Escapee	Shot while trying to escape at the sector border in Treptow, in the area Köllnische Heide / Dammweg	
100	Rolf-Dieter Kabelitz	23 Jun 1951	30 Jan 1971	19	Escapee	Discovered upon entering the border area on the outer ring between Bergfelde (circle Oranienburg) and Reinickendorf on 7 January and pursued by soldiers; shot in pelvis and thigh; was transported to hospital, but began to suffer from a spreading internal infection with bouts of fever and delirium; died on 30 January from pneumonia; Intentional escape likely, but contested in interrogations at the hospital.	
101	Wolfgang Hoffmann	1 Sep 1942	15 Jul 1971	28	West-east-crossing	Escaped 1961; arrested at a border crossing point while asking for legal entry to East Berlin, where he then jumped out of a police station window	
102	Werner Kühl	10 Jan 1949	24 Jul 1971	22	West-east-crossing	While attempting to secretly cross the border from West Berlin to East Berlin with a friend — presumably for the purpose of settling in the GDR — shot dead at the sector border in Treptow near the bridge Britzer Allee / Baumschulenweg; Friend was captured in the East and expelled to the West on 30 August	
103	Dieter Beilig	5 Sep 1941	2 Oct 1971	30	West-east-crossing	Shot while trying to escape through a window after being arrested at Berlin-Mitte, in Brandenburg Gate.	
104	Horst Kullack	20 Nov 1948	21 Jan 1972	23	Escapee	Shot on 1 January 1972 at Lichtenrade	
105	Manfred Weylandt	12 Jul 1942	14 Feb 1972	29	Escapee	Drowned in the Spree after being shot	
106	Klaus Schulze	13 Oct 1952	7 Mar 1972	19	Escapee	Shot at Pestalozzistraße in Falkensee	
107	Cengaver Katrancı	1964	30 Oct 1972	8	No intention	Drowned in the Spree^{e}	
108	Holger H.	1971	22 Jan 1973	1	Escapee	Suffocation^{h}	
109	Volker Frommann	23 Apr 1944	5 Mar 1973	29	Escapee	Jumped from a train on 1 March 1973	
110	Horst Einsiedel	8 Feb 1940	15 Mar 1973	33	Escapee	Shot in the boundary area of Pankow	
111	Manfred Gertzki	17 May 1942	27 Apr 1973	30	Escapee	Shot/drowned in the Spree	
112	Siegfried Kroboth	1968	14 May 1973	5	No intention	Drowned in the Spree^{e}	
113	Burkhard Niering	1 Sep 1950	5 Jan 1974	23	Escapee	Shot while trying to cross Checkpoint Charlie with a hostage	Memorial to Buckhard Niering
114	Czesław Kukuczka	23 Jul 1935	29 Mar 1974	39	Escapee (Polish citizen)	Shot while attempting to flee East Berlin via the Friedrichstrasse train station.	
115	Johannes Sprenger	3 Dec 1905	10 May 1974	68	Suicide^{i}	Shot while entering the sector border area in Berlin-Altglienicke, near Hornkleepfad, between Treptow and Neukölln. The intention to flee is unlikely, as the retiree was allowed to tour West Germany legally and had already done so twice. He had health problems due to lung cancer (but he was not aware of the exact diagnosis). Because of this and his farewell words to his wife, the GDR and, after reunification also the Berlin district court during the "Mauerschützenprozesse", assumed suicide.	
116	Giuseppe Savoca	22 Apr 1968	15 Jun 1974	6	No intention	Drowned in the Spree at Kreuzberg, West Berlin^{e}	
117	Herbert Halli	24 Nov 1953	3 Apr 1975	21	Escapee	Shot at the boundary border of Berlin-Mitte, Zimmer/Otto-Grotewohl-Straße.	
118	Çetin Mert	11 May 1970	11 May 1975	5	No intention	Drowned in the Spree at Kreuzberg, West Berlin^{e}	
119	Herbert Kiebler	24 Mar 1952	27 Jun 1975	23	Escapee	Shot in Außenring in Mahlow, around the boundary of Lichtenrade, western part of the Fernstraße 96.	
120	Lothar Hennig	30 Jun 1954	5 Nov 1975	21	No intention	Shot near to the border while running home	
121	Dietmar Schwietzer	21 Feb 1958	16 Feb 1977	18	Escapee	Shot in Schönwalde, Berliner Allee	Dietmar Schwietzer
122	Henri Weise	13 Jul 1954	May 1977	22	Escapee	Drowned in the Spree; body found on 27 July 1977	
123	Vladimir Odinzov	1960	2 Feb 1979	18	Escapee (Soviet soldier)	Shot on the village road in Seeburg at the outer ring between Seeburg (Kreis Potsdam) and Berlin-Spandau	
124	Ulrich Steinhauer	13 Mar 1956	4 Nov 1980	24	Guard	Shot by a deserting colleague at Schönwalde/Kreis Nauen	
125	Marienetta Jirkowsky	25 Aug 1962	22 Nov 1980	18	Escapee	Shot in Hohen Neuendorf, near the Invalidensiedlung/Florastraße; Two co-refugees managed to escape	Memorial to Marienetta Jirkowsky
126	Grohganz Peter	25 Sep 1948	10 Dec 1980/ 9 February 1981	33	Escapee	Shot in Premnitz	
127	Johannes Muschol	31 May 1949	16 Mar 1981	31	West-east-crossing	Mentally disturbed, shot while crossing the wall from West Berlin to East Berlin	
128	Hans-Jürgen Starrost	24 Jun 1954	16 Apr 1981	26	Escapee	Shot in Teltow-Sigridshorst	
129	Thomas Taubmann	22 Jul 1955	12 Dec 1981	26	Escapee	Tried to escape by train; jumped from train and crashed against wall, after which he was likely run over by the train	
130	Lothar Fritz Freie	8 Feb 1955	6 Jun 1982	27	No intention	Coming from West Berlin, shot while nightly wandering around in a confusing terrain at the border	
131	Silvio Proksch	3 Mar 1962	25 Dec 1983	21	Escapee	Shot at the sector border in Pankow am Bürgerpark near the Leonhard-Frank-Straße during a spontaneous escape attempt under considerable influence of alcohol	
132	Michael Schmidt	20 Oct 1964	1 Dec 1984	20	Escapee	Shot in Pankow/Wollankstraße	
133	Rainer Liebeke	11 Sep 1951	3 Sep 1986	34	Escapee	Drowned in the Sacrower See	
134	Manfred Mäder	23 Aug 1948	21 Nov 1986	38	Escapee	Shot alongside René Groß in Treptow	
135	René Groß	1 May 1964	21 Nov 1986	22	Escapee	Shot alongside Manfred Mäder in Treptow	
136	Michael Bittner	31 Aug 1961	24 Nov 1986	25	Escapee	Shot in Glienicke/Nordbahn	
137	Lutz Schmidt	8 Jul 1962	12 Feb 1987	24	Escapee	Shot in Treptow	
138	Ingolf Diederichs	13 Apr 1964	13 Jan 1989	24	Escapee	Jumped from a train at Bösebrücke/Grenzübergangsstelle Bornholmer Straße	
139	Chris Gueffroy	21 Jun 1968	5 Feb 1989	20	Escapee	Shot in Britz	Memorial to Chris Geoffroy
140	Winfried Freudenberg	29 Aug 1956	8 Mar 1989	32	Escapee	Balloon crash	

== Commemoration ==
There has been commemoration of the victims both before and after the German reunification. There are various memorial sites and memorial services. There are also streets and squares that have been named after the dead.

=== Memorial sites ===
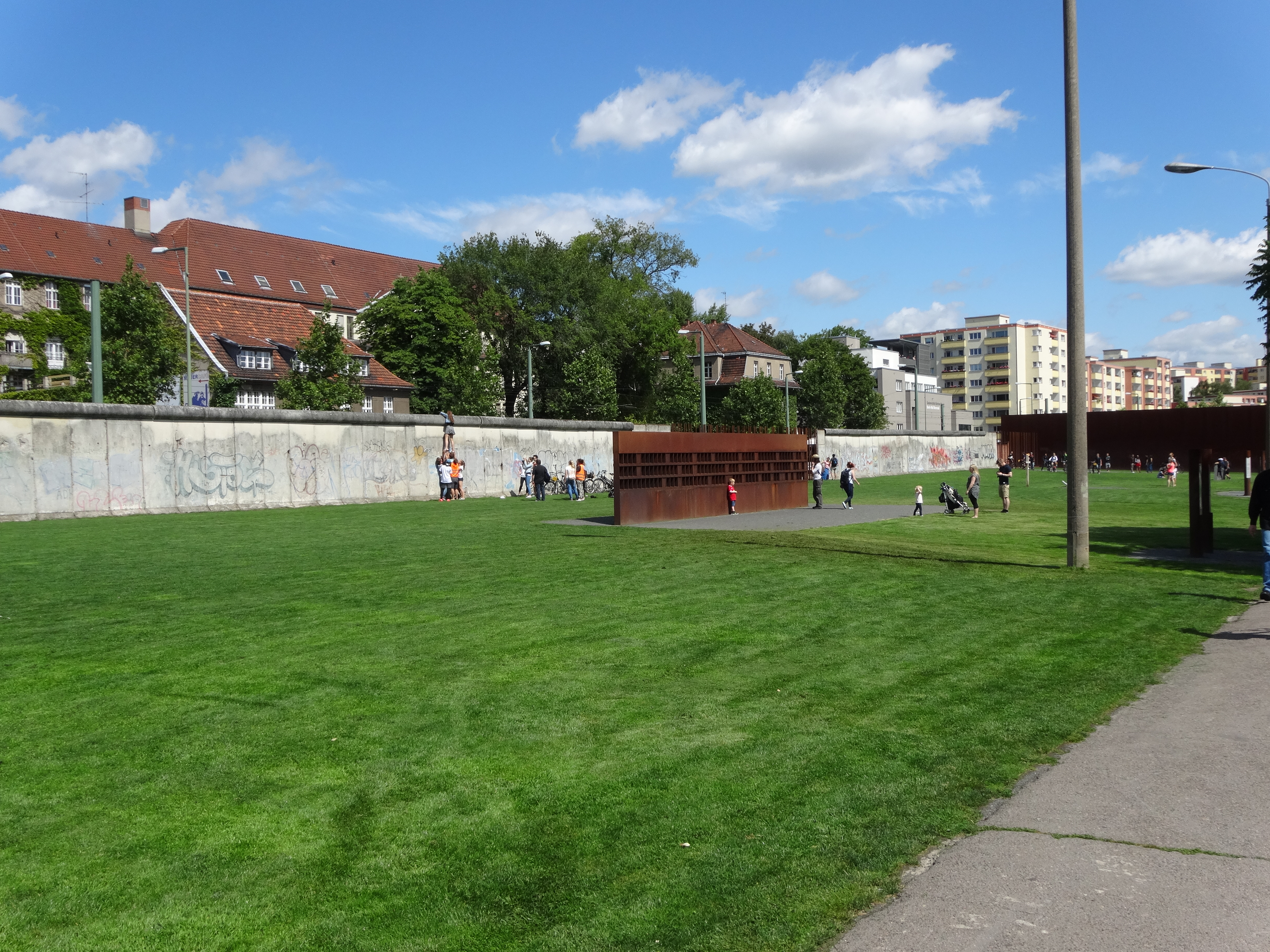
Remains of the Wall, part of the Berlin Wall Memorial, on the corner between Bernauerstraße and Bergstraße, seen from the east (2015). The grass covers what used to be the "death strip". The rusted monument in the centre of the picture displays the names and photographs of the victims. The grey building in the background is also part of the memorial site.

In remembrance of the victims there have been erected numerous memorial sites, funded by private initiatives and public bodies on the orders of the Berlin boroughs, the Berlin House of Representatives or the federal government, which are placed over various places in Berlin. The oldest date back to the days when the Wall was still standing. They include monuments, crucifixes and memorial stones, and were visited by foreign politicians during state visits. Together with the border installations, there were also some memorial sites that were removed when the Wall fell. Sites for fallen border guards were especially affected by this. Until the tenth anniversary of the building of the Wall, for every victim the private Berliner Bürger-Verein ("Berlin Citizen Association") placed a white wooden cross at the scene of the event. They were aided in their effort by the senate of West-Berlin. On 13 August 1971, the memorial site Weiße Kreuze ("White Crosses") was inaugurated on the east side of the Reichstag building.

On a fence in front of the wall, there were memorial crosses with the names and date of death on them. However, since the government moved to Berlin, the white crosses had to be relocated in 1995 from the eastern side of the Reichstag. The new location is on the west side of the building at a fence of the Tiergarten. 2003, Wolfgang Thierse inaugurated a new memorial designed by Jan Wehberg with the same name as the one on Reichstagufer. On seven both-sided inscribed crosses are the names of the 13 deaths. Another memorial of the Civil Association was in Bernauer Straße. Other victims are remembered through commemorative plates embedded in sidewalks and other installations which are nearby their death spot. In October 2004, the Working Group 13 August built the Freedom Memorial at Checkpoint Charlie. It reminds people of the victims of the Berlin Wall and the inner German border with 1067 crosses. The memorial had to be removed after about half a year because the landowners terminated the lease with the working group.

With the help of other artists, performance artist Ben Wagin founded The Parliament of Trees in the former death strip on the east side of the Spree River, opposite the Reichstag. 258 names of victims of the Wall are listed on granite slabs. Some listed as "unknown man" or "unknown woman" are merely identified with a date of death. The collection, which was created in 1990, contains people who were later not considered to be victims of the Wall. Black and white painted segments of the Wall stand in the background. The memorial needed to be minimized for the construction of the Marie-Elisabeth-Lüders-Haus. In 2005, a further memorial was opened in the basement of the Bundestag building. They used wall segments of the former Parliament of Trees. In 1998, the Republic of Germany and the state of Berlin established the Berlin Wall Memorial on Bernauer Straße and declared it as a national memorial. The memorial harks back to a draft drawn up by the architects Kohlhoff & Kohlhoff. Later, it was extended and today it includes the Berlin Wall Documentation Center, a visiting center, the Chapel of Reconciliation, the Window of Remembrance with portraits of those who lost their lives on the grounds of the Berlin Wall, and a 60-meter-long section of the former border installations which is enclosed by steel walls at both ends.

The northern wall bears the inscription:"In memory of the city's division from 13 August 1961 to 9 November 1989 and in commemoration of the victims of the communist reign of violence". In remembrance of the Building of the Berlin Wall's 50th anniversary the foundation "Berliner Mauer" erected 29 steles, which commemorate the victims, along the former border between West Germany and the GDR. Apart from the 3.6-metre (11.8 ft) large, orange pillars, several signs inform about the wall victims. A planned stele for Lothar Hennig in Sacrow was not built for the time being, because Henning is viewed skeptically as a result of his actions for the MfS as a former IM.

=== Commemoration services ===
Several organizations—in large part associations or private initiatives—have been carrying out annual commemoration services in Berlin ever since the first casualties occurred. These services are usually held on the anniversary of the building of the Berlin Wall; they were partially supported by West Berlin's district offices or by the senate minutes. As a result of this, the "Hour of Silence" was introduced for silent prayers on every 13 August between 8:00 – 9:00 p.m. Ever since 13 August 1990, the Federal State of Berlin commemorates the deaths. This ceremony takes place every year at the "Peter-Fechter-Kreuz" in the Zimmerstraße near Checkpoint Charlie. Besides these, there are also many commemoration services and protests against the Berlin Wall at other locations in Germany and abroad on 13 August. An annual commemoration service of the fall of the Berlin Wall takes place on 9 November each year at Eureka College in Illinois, United States, the alma mater of President Ronald Reagan.

== Responses to deaths ==
=== East German ===
The use of lethal force on the Berlin Wall was an integral part of the East German state's policy towards its border system. Nonetheless, the East German government was well aware that border killings had undesirable consequences. The West German, US, British and French authorities protested killings when they occurred and the international reputation of East Germany was damaged as a result. It also undermined the East German government's support at home.

The Stasi, East Germany's secret police, adopted a policy of concealing killings as much as possible. In the case of the November 1986 shooting of Michael Bittner at the Wall, a Stasi report commented: "The political sensitivity of the state border to Berlin (West) made it necessary to conceal the incident. Rumours about the incident had to be prevented from circulating, with information passing to West Berlin or the FRG [West Germany]." The Stasi took charge of "corpse cases" and those injured while trying to cross the border, who were transported to hospitals run by the Stasi or the police where they would recuperate before being transferred to Stasi prisons. The Stasi also took sole responsibility for the disposal of the dead and their possessions. Bodies were not returned to relatives but were cremated, usually at the crematorium at Baumschulenweg. Occasionally the cost of the cremations was covered by the victims themselves using money taken from their pockets.

Stasi officers posing as policemen would inform the relatives, though not before trying to obtain "valuable pieces of information on the border violation". Deaths would be stated as being due to "a border provocation of his own causing", "a fatal accident of his own causing" or "drowning in a border waterway". Every border death was investigated in detail to identify how the attempt had been made, whether there were any vulnerabilities in the border system that needed to be remedied and whether anyone else had been involved. If necessary, the family, relatives, friends, colleagues and neighbours were put under surveillance. The reports produced following such cases were sent to the relevant member of the East German Politburo for consideration.

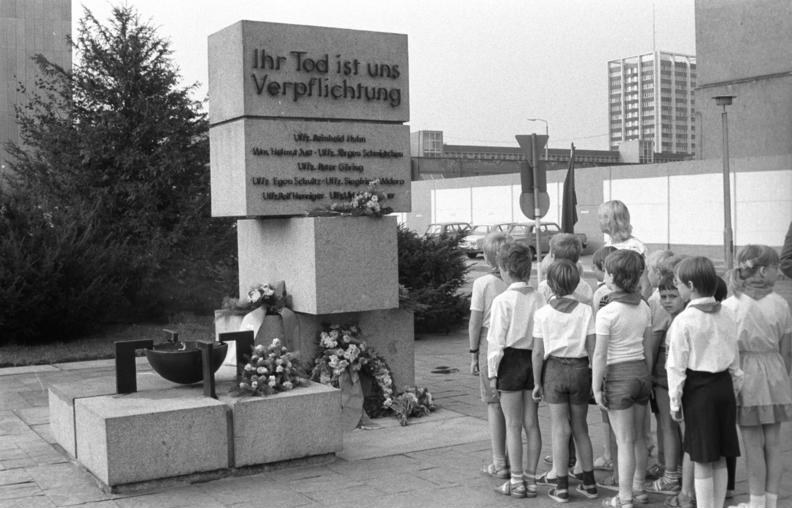
East German memorial to border guards killed at the Berlin Wall, August 1986. It was demolished following the fall of the Wall.

The one exception to the general rule of concealment and obfuscation was that of border guards who died on duty. Most were killed either deliberately or accidentally by escapees or escape helpers. The dead guards were hailed by East German government propaganda as heroes, but West German public opinion was divided about the morality of killing border guards. Some took the view that escapees were entitled to use force in the course of crossing the border, but (as in one case tried in a West Berlin court) others saw the guard's life as taking priority over an escapee's freedom.

In those cases they did not manage to conceal, however, the GDR's media was subject to stringent controls by the Stasi as well as the Socialist Unity Party of Germany, using Neues Deutschland, the GDR's second largest daily newspaper, as their zentralorgan. Through its own television station, the GDR government controlled the content shown in television broadcasting as well. The GDR border troops' actions were being portrayed as legitimate border defense and the people who were killed while trying to escape were defamed both in official statements as well as in reports of the state-controlled media. In 1962, East German journalist Karl-Eduard von Schnitzler commented on the death of Peter Fechter in the television program Der schwarze Kanal: "The life of every single one of our brave boys in uniform is worth more than the life of a lawbreaker to us. Staying away from the border, you can save yourself blood, tears and screams." SED newspaper Neues Deutschland claimed Fechter was driven into suicide by "front city bandits" as well as accusing him of being homosexual. In similar fashion, Günter Litfin was falsely depicted as being a homosexual, a prostitute as well as a criminal. In 1966, the Berliner Zeitung depicted Eduard Wroblewski as antisocial and being wanted as a Foreign Legionnaire for serious crimes in the district of Halle. These cases were exemplary of representatives of the press constructing false allegations in order to defame killed escapees.

=== West German ===
In cases of death, the Abgeordnetenhaus of Berlin and Mayor issued statements of indignation concerning the deceased, the Wall and the situation in the GDR. In some cases, the Senate of Western Berlin asked the respective American, British or French authorities to lodge a protest at the Soviet site. Up until the late sixties, terms like Wall of Shame (German: "Schandmauer" or "Mauer der Schande") were used by politicians from Western Berlin to denominate the wall. Speaking to the press, representatives also used misrepresented incidents as examples and depicted GDR state organs as responsible. After Rudolf Müller had shot the border guard Reinhold Huhn and fled west through a self-made tunnel, Egon Bahr, speaker of the Senate at that time, announced he had only thrown him an "uppercut". The Western press also adopted this misstatement and used the heading "trigger-happy Vopos (colloquial German term for "Volkspolizei", the East German People's Police) killed own post." In other cases, the press published stories using drastic language to accuse the Wall as well as the people in charge. After Günter Litfins' death, the "B.Z."-tabloid wrote: "Ulbricht's manhunters became murderers!" The Frankfurter Allgemeine commented on the "brutal cold-bloodedness" of the guards.

The cases that were known in West Berlin provoked demonstrations among the population. Members of the Senate inspected the crime scenes and spoke to the press as well as public audiences. Various groups, and also individuals, launched protest campaigns against the Wall and the shootings. The fact that Peter Fechter bled to death in plain view of the public without anybody being able to help him led to spontaneous mass demonstrations, which in turn resulted in riots in the following night. West Berlin policemen and US soldiers prevented a storming of the Berlin Wall. Buses bringing Soviet soldiers to the Tiergarten where they were to guard the Soviet War Memorial were pelted with stones by protesters. The incident also led to anti-American protests, which were condemned by Willy Brandt. In the ensuing time, loudspeaker cars were sporadically set up at the Berlin Wall, urging the GDR border guards not to shoot at refugees and warning them of possible consequences. As a result of the shootings, West German groups lodged complaints with the UN Commission on Human Rights. The non-partisan Kuratorium Unteilbares Deutschland (Committee for an Indivisible Germany) sold protest placards and lapel pins in all of West Germany against the border regime and its consequences. Initially, West Berlin's regulatory authorities gave fugitives covering fire if they were being fired at by GDR border guards. This resulted in at least one lethal incident on 23 May 1962, when the border guard Peter Göring was shot dead by a West Berlin policeman while firing 44 times at a fleeing boy.

In 1991, Berlin's public prosecution department rendered this incident assistance in emergency and self-defence in consequence of the police officer stating that he felt his life being threatened. In many cases, West Berliner rescuers were not able to reach wounded persons because they were either on GDR territory or in East Berlin. They had no authorization to set foot into this territory, so that a trespassing would have been life-endangering for the rescue workers. The four children: Çetin Mert, Cengaver Katrancı, Siegfried Kroboth and Giuseppe Savoca, who fell into the Spree at the Gröben riverside between the years 1972 and 1975, could not be rescued, even though West Berlin rescue forces arrived quickly on site. In April 1983, the transit passenger Rudolf Burkert died of a heart attack, during an interrogation at the border checkpoint Derwitz. During a subsequent autopsy in West Germany, several external injuries were detected, so that an external forceful impact could not be ruled out as the cause of death. This lethal incident resulted not only in negative press reports but also led to an intervention by Helmut Kohl and Franz Josef Strauss. For the imminent public-sector loans they imposed on the GDR the condition to conduct humane border controls. Two further deaths of West Germans in transit traffic, shortly after Burkert's death, set off demonstrations against the GDR regime and a broad media discussion. In the period that followed inspections decreased in transit traffic.

=== Western Allies ===
After cases of death became public, the Western Allies lodged a protest at the Soviet government. In many known cases, the Western Allies did not react to requests for help. In the case of Peter Fechter, local US soldiers stated that they were not allowed to cross the border and enter East Berlin, although this was permitted to Allied military personnel when uniforms are worn. Major General Albert Watson, Town Major at that time, thus contacted his superiors in the White House, without receiving clear orders. Watson said: "This is a case for which I don't have any imperatives." President Kennedy was concerned over this issue and dispatched Security Advisor McGeorge Bundy to the Town Major to call for preventative measures against such incidents. Bundy, who already resided in Berlin for a pre-scheduled visit in 1962, informed Willy Brandt about the President's intention to back him up on this issue. He however clarified to Brandt and Adenauer, that US support ends at the wall, as there will be no efforts to dislodge it. Ten days after Fechter's death, Konrad Adenauer contacted the French President Charles de Gaulle, to send a letter to Nikita Khrushchev through him. De Gaulle offered his cooperation. Under the involvement of Willy Brandt, the four City Commanders reached an agreement concerning military ambulances from the Western Allies, which were now allowed to pick up injured persons from the border zone, to bring them to hospitals in East Berlin.

== Legal cases ==
Many of those involved in the killings at the Berlin Wall were investigated in a number of legal proceedings. Trials investigated border guards and senior political officials for their responsibility for the killings, some of which were believed to be unlawful.

Members of the National Defence Council, the political group responsible for the policies regarding the Berlin Wall, and the Socialist Unity Party of Germany (SED) were brought to court in the 1990s. In 1997, Egon Krenz, who had in 1989 become the last Communist leader of East Germany, was sentenced to six-and-a-half years in prison for the manslaughter of four Germans who were shot while attempting to cross the Berlin Wall. Other men to be given jail sentences include the Defence Minister at the time, Heinz Kessler (his deputy), Fritz Streletz, Günter Schabowski and Günther Kleiber.

In November 2009, an interview with Kessler showed that he believed the Wall should never have been removed:

I deplore the fact that East Germans were shot while trying to flee westward, but the Berlin Wall served a useful purpose. It contributed to a polarisation between the two blocs, but it also gave a certain stability to their relationship. While the Wall was standing, there was peace. Today there's hardly a place that isn't in flames. Were you ever in East Germany? It was a wonderful country!

Two other key-members of the National Defence Council, chairman Erich Honecker and Stasi leader Erich Mielke, were also investigated. However, during the trial both men were seriously ill and the court controversially decided to drop the cases. Honecker died in 1994 and Mielke, who had served some time in jail for the 1931 murder of two police captains, died in 2000.

Many guards were themselves investigated for their actions, with the final case closing on 12 February 2004. In some of the cases there was insufficient evidence to identify which guard had fired the fatal shot and thus no prosecution could be made. Others were sentenced to probation for their role in the shootings. The harshest sentence imposed was in the case of the guard who shot Walter Kittel. He was convicted of manslaughter and sentenced to six years in prison, which was later increased to 10 years imprisonment for murder. The reason for the harsher conviction and sentence was that the guard had shot at Kittel after he attempted to surrender. Numerous guards were the same ones who had been awarded a Medal for Exemplary Border Service or other award for the killing.

== Footnotes ==
^{^a} Rudolf Urban and his wife both tried to climb out from a window at their home of Bernauer Straße 1 on 19 August 1961 while trying to escape but fell to the ground and were injured. They both went to hospital with their injuries.
^{^b} Tried to break through the border crossing in a truck filled with sand and gravel; he was shot several times and suffocated in the sand that entered the cab after the truck crashed.
^{^c} Had surrendered when he was shot; the border guard responsible, initially sentenced to six years for manslaughter, had his sentence increased to ten years imprisonment for murder in 1992 precisely due to the fact that the guard had shot at Kittel after the latter had signaled his intent to surrender.
^{^d} National People's Army soldier who had deserted
^{e ^1 ^2 ^3 ^4 ^5} In these five cases the guards were accused of obstructing the rescue of those who were drowning.
^{^f} After an evening of dancing on 7 July 1962 Mende was escorted to a guard house for not having sufficient identification. Believing the matter over, he ran towards the bus home and was shot. He died nearly six years later.
^{g ^1 ^2}Married couple Eckhardt and Christel committed suicide after a failed plane hijacking.
^{^h}Was hiding with his parents in the crates in the back of a truck crossing the border when he began to cry. His mother held his mouth and he died of suffocation.
^{^i} Ruled as a suicide by a court in Berlin, Sprenger was shot as he approached a watchtower. He had been diagnosed with lung cancer and had told his wife that he would return in a coffin.

== See also ==
- Republikflucht
- History of Berlin
- The Tunnel (NBC documentary)
- Chapel of Reconciliation

== Sources ==
- Grafe, Roman (2002). Die Grenze durch Deutschland - eine Chronik von 1945 bis 1990. Berlin: Siedler. ISBN 3-88680-744-4.
- Grathwol, Robert P.; Moorhus, Donita M. (1999). American Forces in Berlin: Cold War Outpost, 1945-1994. New York: New York UP. ISBN 978-0-7881-2504-1.
- Hertle, Hans-Hermann; Nooke, Maria (2009). Die Todesopfer an der Berliner Mauer 1961–1989. Ein biographisches Handbuch. Berlin: Ch. Links. ISBN 978-3-86153-517-1.
- Hofmann, Arne (2007). The emergence of détente in Europe: Brandt, Kennedy and the formation of Ostpolitik. London: Routledge. ISBN 978-0-415-38637-1.
- Lappenküper, Ulrich (2001). Die Deutsch-französischen Beziehungen, 1949-1963: 1949-1958, Band 1. Oldenbourg: Oldenbourg Wissenschaftsverlag. ISBN 3-486-56522-2.
- Major, Patrick (2009). Behind the Berlin Wall: East Germany and the Frontiers of Power. Oxford: Oxford UP. ISBN 978-0-19-924328-0.
- Stötzel, Georg; Wengeler, Martin; Böke, Karin (1995). Kontroverse Begriffe: Geschichte des öffentlichen Sprachgebrauchs in der Bundesrepublik Deutschland. Band 4 von Sprache, Politik, Öffentlichkeit. Berlin: De Gruyter. ISBN 3-11-014652-5.
