= Erna Kelm =

Died at the Berlin wall

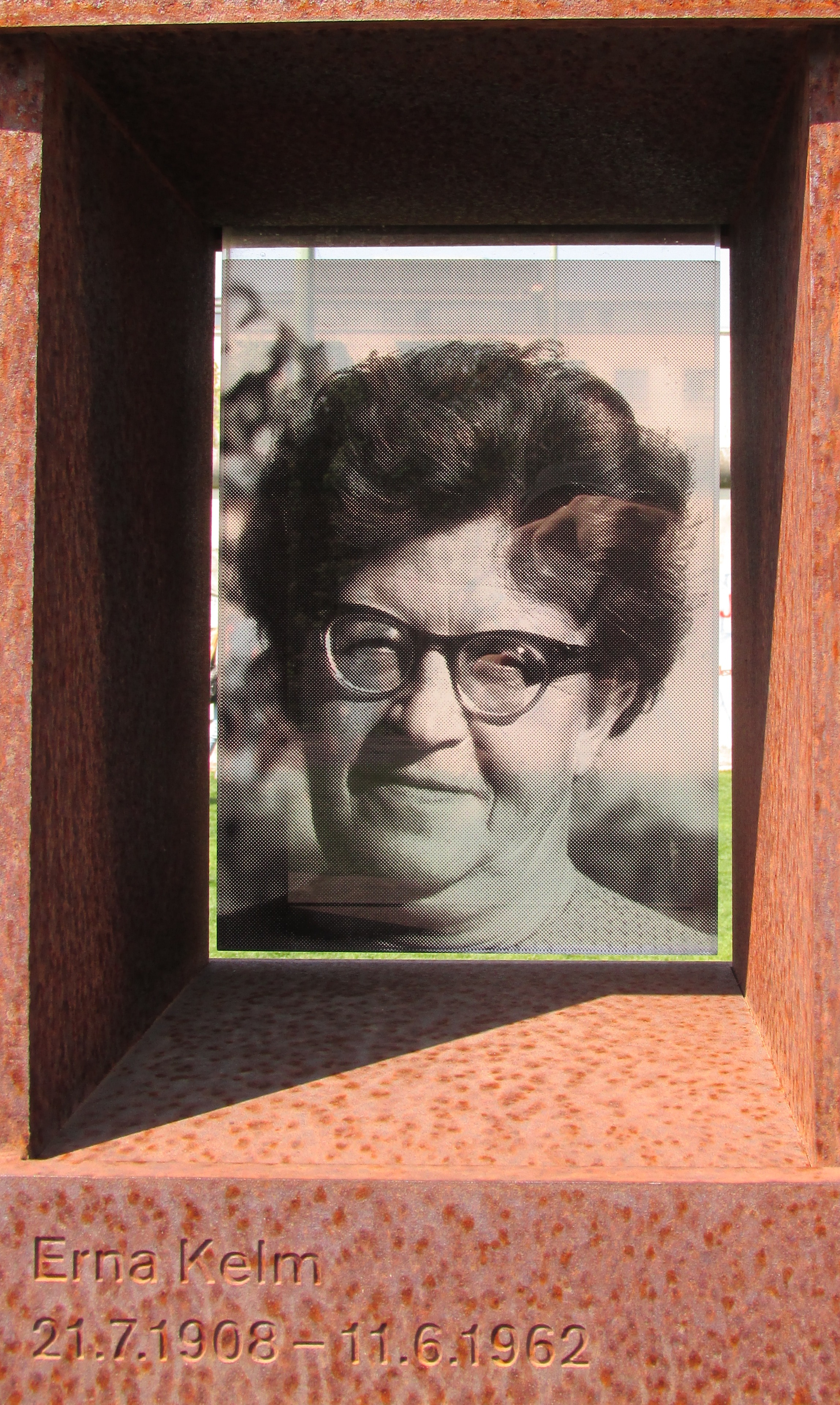
- Kelm at the Window of Remembrance, Berlin Wall Memorial, Bernauer Straße
- Born: 21 July 1908; Frankfurt an der Oder, German Empire
- Died: 11 June 1962 (aged 53); Zehlendorf, West Berlin, West Germany
- Cause of death: Drowning
- Body discovered: Havel river between Potsdam District, East Germany, and Zehlendorf, West Berlin
- Monuments: Window of Remembrance, Berlin
- Known for: 1 of 8 women who died at the Berlin Wall

Erna Kelm (July 21, 1908 – June 11, 1962) was a German woman who became the twenty-third known person to die at the Berlin Wall. Kelm tried to cross the border by swimming across the Havel river, but drowned during the attempt. Kelm was one of only eight women victims, and at the age of 53, was one of the oldest victims of the Berlin Wall.

== Biography ==
Erna Kelm was born on July 21, 1908, in Frankfurt an der Oder, German Empire. Kelm had at least two children and lived in Potsdam, but in 1947, shortly after the end of World War II, she illegally moved to Lübeck to work as a nurse. At the time Germany was occupied by the Allies, with Potsdam in the Soviet zone and Lübeck in the British Zone, Kelm moved without obtaining the necessary permit issued by the occupying powers. In 1948, a year later, she moved to West Berlin, taking a job as a nurse's aide in a children's home for refugees. Kelm frequently left West Berlin to visit her children in neighboring Potsdam, where she was "suspected of engaging in intelligence activities," according to Soviet police data, but this accusation remained unconfirmed. However, the suspicion led to her being interrogated by East German authorities in November 1953, and a hearing in December 1953, after which she moved back to Potsdam. In her own words, Kelm returned because she missed her children, and began working as the director of a special care home/facility.

== Death ==
On the morning of June 11, 1962, a fisherman found Kelm's body in the River Havel in Berlin-Zehlendorf, West Berlin. Her East German identification card, hidden in her sock, identified her as Erna Kelm from Sacrow, 53 years old, born on July 21, 1908, in Frankfurt an der Oder. Evidence suggested that she had tried to swim across the Havel to West Berlin, as the middle of the river formed the local border between East Germany and West Berlin. Berlin-Zehlendorf and Sacrow, an area of Potsdam just north of the main town where Kelm had lived, were both sparsely populated with minimal presence of the Berlin Wall and the East German border guards. Kelm was carrying other personal documents in a waterproof plastic bag on her body, and was also wearing a life jacket under her clothes. The investigation by the West Berlin police ended with the result that Erna Kelm drowned while trying to escape, and no crime was committed against her. Kelm's body was handed over to her relatives in Potsdam at their request. There was no trace of the body after it was transported to Potsdam, and nothing is known about the relatives of Erna Kelm or where she is buried. Even the West Berlin investigation, which documented the retrieval of the body from the water, was closed shortly thereafter and the file was sent to the Central Registry Office in Salzgitter. When the case was re-opened 30 years later, the original investigation findings were confirmed.

Erna Kelm was one of only eight women killed at the Berlin wall, among the total of at least 140 victims. Further, of all the Berlin Wall victims that were classified as escapees/attempted escapees, Kelm was probably the only one who attempted to escape for totally unknown reasons.

== Aftermath ==
In West Berlin, there were several press reports about her death, but these reports were given little attention. The main focus of the press at the time was over general concern regarding the rising tensions in Berlin as the Warsaw Pact members had submitted a statement announcing plans to sign a separate peace treaty with East Germany if American-Soviet talks were not able to "normalize" the situation in West Berlin and remove the "occupying regime." The Soviet Union even sent a note of protest to the three western Allies, strongly criticizing the involvement of West Berlin police in border incidents at the Berlin Wall. Kelm was admitted to the official list of the victims of the Berlin Wall and in a brochure published by the Bundesministerium für innerdeutsche Beziehungen (Federal Ministry for Intra-German Relations) on the first anniversary of the Berlin Wall. This brochure mentioned her fatal escape attempt; this ensured the memory of the 53-year-old woman who drowned at the border to West Berlin was preserved."

Erna Kelm's "Chronic der Mauer" biography has existed since at least 2007, according to the Internet Archive. However, her photo, listed as from a private collection, has only been added recently (as of 2014).

== See also ==
- List of deaths at the Berlin Wall
- Berlin Crisis of 1961
