= The Tunnel (1962 film) =

1962 film

- Narrated by: Piers Anderton

Production
- Producer: Reuven Frank

Original release
- Network: NBC
- Release: December 10, 1962

The Tunnel was a 90-minute black-and-white documentary film that chronicled how three West Berlin university students organized the escape of 26 friends and family members by digging a tunnel underneath the Berlin Wall from a former factory in West Berlin into the Communist East. Produced by Reuven Frank and narrated by Piers Anderton, it was an NBC White Paper installment that was broadcast on December 10, 1962, and sponsored by the Gulf Oil Corporation.

The Tunnel earned three Emmy Awards in 1963. It was the only documentary to receive the award as The Program of the Year. It was also honored for Outstanding Achievement in the Field of Documentary (awarded to Frank) and Outstanding Achievement in International Reporting (awarded to Anderton).

The Tunnel was the basis for a pair of similarly named German projects (Der Tunnel) which were released just under four decades after the original. One was the 1999 documentary directed by Marcus Vetter, which featured the NBC footage accompanied by firsthand accounts from the actual participants. The other was the 2001 television movie production directed by Roland Suso Richter, which was loosely based on the events recorded in the original.

Later, in 2019, the BBC released a ten-part radio documentary about the escape, based on original interviews with the survivors, documents from the Stasi archives, and the NBC recordings.

== Production ==
NBC, who were in competition with CBS to be first to film a tunnel escape for their news programs, financed the excavation project, giving the students (the 2016 equivalent of) about $150,000 for exclusive rights to film them digging.

An internal memo issued by Frank to the crew working on the documentary included the following outline of the goals of television news production:

Every news story should, without sacrifice of probity and responsibility, display the attributes of fiction, of drama. It should have structure and conflict, problem and denouement, rising and falling action, a beginning, a middle, and an end. These are not only the essentials of drama; they are the essentials of narrative. We are in the business of narrative because we are in the business of communication.

== Broadcast postponement ==
The National Broadcasting Company (NBC) officially announced on 11 October 1962 that it was going to televise the documentary on 31 October from 7:30 p.m. to 9 p.m. (EST). Reluctant to add to global tensions in light of the Cuban Missile Crisis, the television network decided on 23 October to indefinitely postpone the broadcast.

The Kennedy administration had opposed airing the documentary, worried that NBC was increasing tensions between the United States and the Soviet Union at the height of the Cold War. Robert F. Kennedy, the president's brother and attorney general, was reported to have commented "That was a terrible thing you people did, buying that tunnel." Concerns about the ethics of NBC's involvement and the safety of the students were also expressed.

== See also ==
- Tunnel 57, another tunnel built by the same group of students
- Girrmann Group, another group of students who organized escapes through the sewers in 1961
- Escape from East Berlin (1962 film)
- Korean Demilitarized Zone#Incursion tunnels
