= Klaus Brueske =

- Born: 14 September 1938; Berlin, Nazi Germany
- Died: 18 April 1962 (aged 23); West Berlin, West Germany
- Cause of death: Suffocation

Klaus Brueske (14 September 1938 – 18 April 1962) was a German truck driver who became the sixteenth person to die at the Berlin Wall. Brueske died in an attempt to break through the Heinrich-Heine-Straße border crossing in a truck, and was the first Berlin Wall victim to die from suffocation.

== Life ==
Klaus Brueske was born on 14 September 1938 in Berlin, Nazi Germany, one of eight children raised in the Friedrichshain area of the city. By 1962, Brueske still lived in Friedrichshain, now in East Berlin, but was a Grenzgänger (cross-border commuter) who worked as a truck driver for AEG in West Berlin. Following the abrupt closing of the border and construction of the Berlin Wall on 13 August 1961, by East German authorities, Brueske remained in East Berlin and found a new job as a truck driver. Quickly becoming unhappy with the situation in the East Germany, Brueske started to plan his escape to West Berlin with friends, deciding to break through the border with a truck.

== Death ==
On 17 April 1962, Brueske borrowed a truck from his workplace then loaded it with sand, and that evening met with six friends who wanted to take part in the escape attempt, where they drank for courage. When Brueske and the men went to the truck to begin they saw Volkspolizei officers nearby, instead they parted ways so as not to attract any attention from the policemen. At the later meeting, only three of Brueske's friends were still willing to escape. Brueske sat down at the steering wheel to drive, Lothar M. sat in the passenger seat, and Peter G. laid down in the loading area of the truck. After midnight, they drove at the Heinrich-Heine-Straße border crossing at about 70 km/h (44 mph), breaking through the first two boom barriers, and a soldier of the East German border guards fired a total of 14 shots at the vehicle. The truck came to a halt on the West Berlin side after hitting a wall, but Brueske had died and his friends were injured, and all three were taken to the hospital. Brueske was pronounced dead, and an autopsy of his corpse revealed that he had suffered two non-fatal gunshot injuries to the neck, instead Brueske had suffocated in the sand loaded on the back of the truck, which had poured into the cab due to the impact with the wall.

Klaus Brueske's funeral, which his mother and siblings were prohibited from attending by the East German government, took place at the Friedhof Lübars cemetery in West Berlin.

== After Reunification ==
After the German reunification, the Berlin public prosecutor at the Landgericht Berlin brought charges against the border guard who had fired the shots at Brueske's truck. The court sentenced him in 1998 to imprisonment of 14 months, which was converted to probation.

== See also ==
- List of deaths at the Berlin Wall
- Berlin Crisis of 1961

== Literature ==
- Christine Brecht: Klaus Brueske, in: Die Todesopfer an der Berliner Mauer 1961–1989. Links, Berlin 2009, ISBN 978-3-86153-517-1, p. 79–81.
