= Cengaver Katrancı =

- Born: 1964
- Died: 30 October 1972 (aged 8); East Berlin, GDR
- Cause of death: Drowned in the Spree
- Resting place: Ankara, Turkey

Cengaver Katrancı (1964 – October 30, 1972) was a Turkish boy, who lived in West Berlin, in district of Kreuzberg. He drowned in the river Spree, which at the time and in this place was a border between East and West Berlin. In view of the circumstances surrounding the accident Cengaver Katrancı is one of the youngest victims of the Berlin Wall's existence.

== The circumstances of accident ==
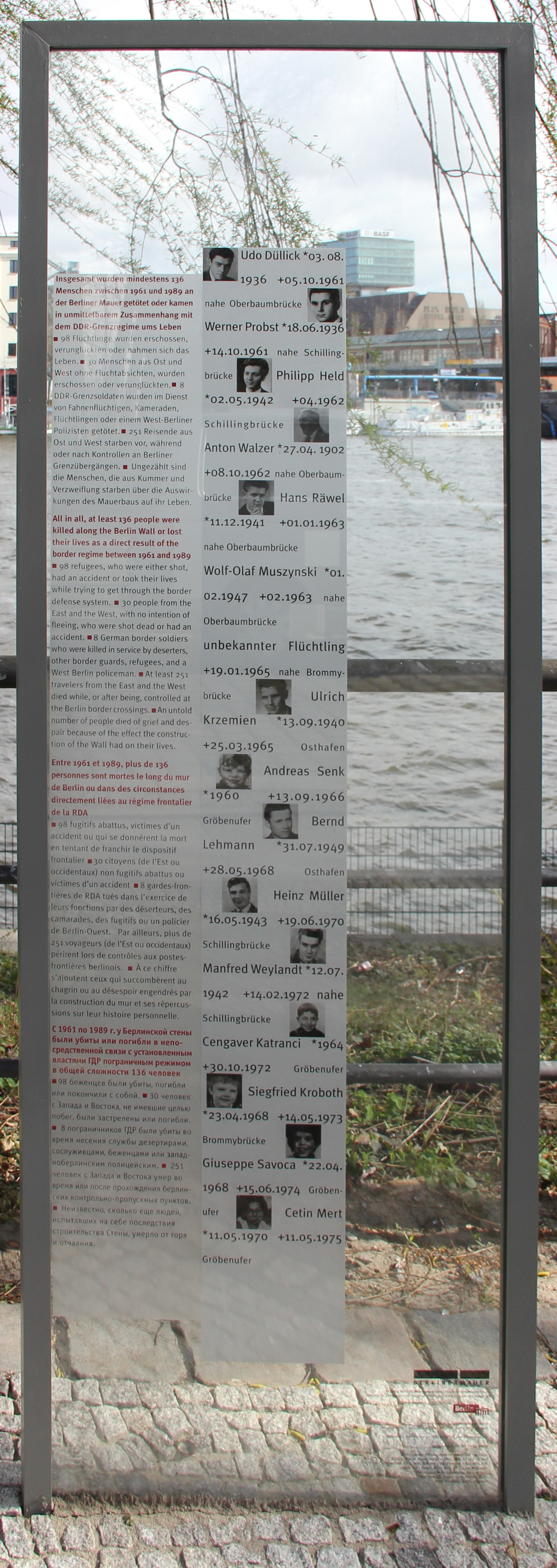
Cengaver Katrancı (4th picture from the bottom) on the memorial plaque at the May-Ayim-Ufer.

On 30 October 1972, at approximately 13:00, eight-year-old Cengaver Katrancı, together with a friend, were feeding swans on the River Spree (Gröbenufer street, currently May-Ayim-Ufer). Katrancı lost his balance and fell into the river, which was, at this section, part of the Friedrichshain district of East Berlin. A fisherman was present, but offered no assistance for fear that doing so would be treated as a violation of the GDR border and, therefore, the East German guards could shoot him. A West Berlin fire department, including two divers, was alerted, but could not intervene after they unsuccessfully attempted to obtain permission for the entry into the river. An East German fire boat and a tanker were also present, but did not take the rescue operation. Despite people on the west side crying out to them for help, they also chose not to violate the forbidden zone without permission to get close to the western waterfront. Approx 13:30 West Berlin police car arrived. Following negotiations with the border guard officer at Oberbaum Bridge, around 14:30, an East German rescue boat began searching for the boy. About half an hour later his body was taken out of water.

That evening the boy's mother received an entry permit for East Berlin in order to receive his body. Identifying remains was performed at the Institute of Forensic Medicine Charité. In accordance with the wishes of his mother, Cengaver Katrancı was buried in Ankara, in Turkey. He had three siblings.

== Other victims ==
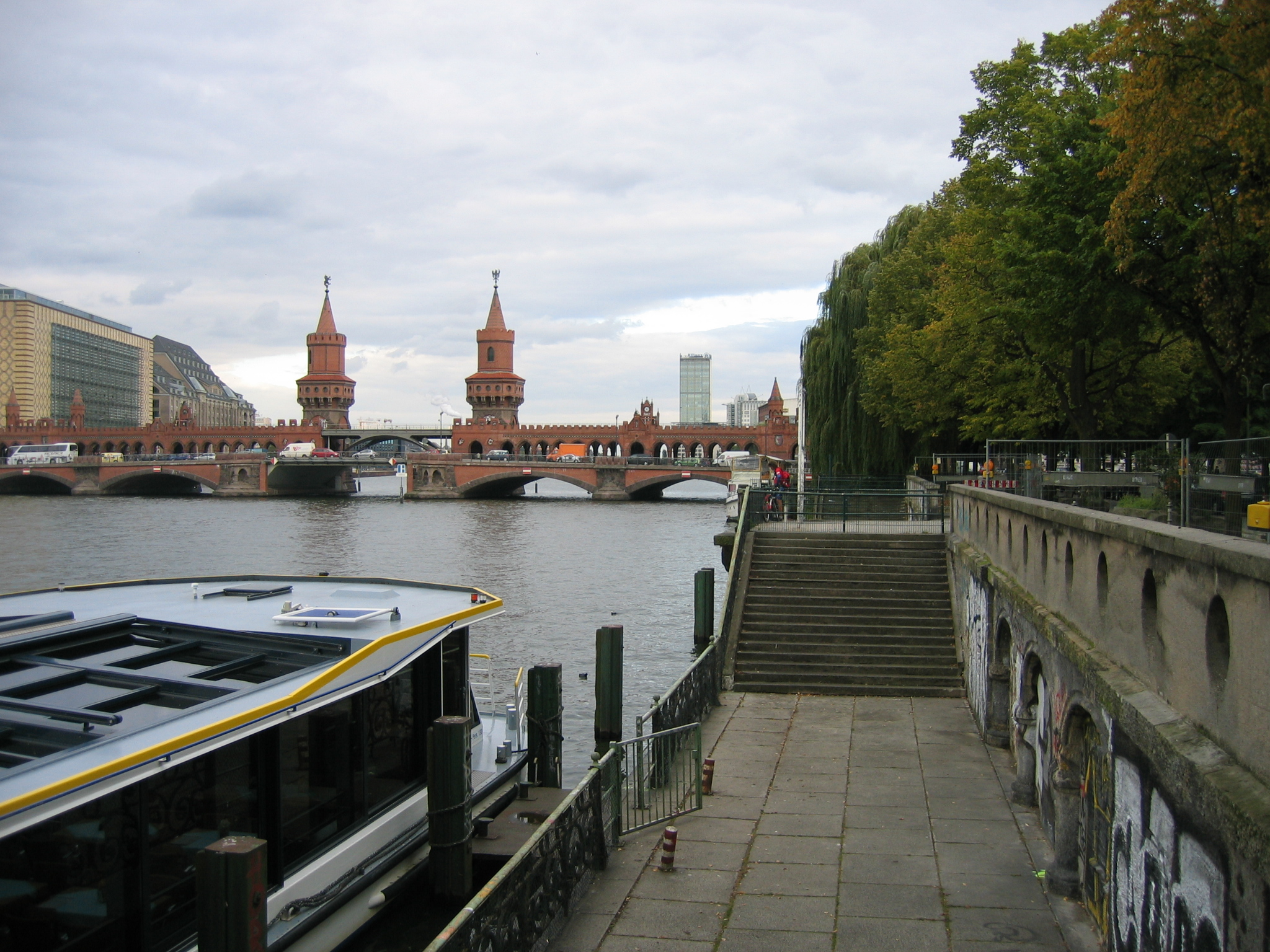
Embankment on the May-Ayim-Ufer (formerly Gröbenufer) in Kreuzberg. Oberbaum Bridge in the distance.

Cengaver Katrancı was a second of the five children (first 6 year old Andreas Senk), who died in similar circumstances in the same place or nearby. The remaining three children: 5 year old Siegfried Kroboth, 6 year old Giuseppe Savoca and 5 year old Çetin Mert.

== Legal consequences ==
After this accident, the West Berlin Senate entered into negotiations with the GDR, resulting in a 1975 treaty between the two Germanys on cooperation in rescue operations at boundary waters.

== See also ==
- List of deaths at the Berlin Wall
- Berlin Crisis of 1961
