= Rudolf Urban (Berlin Wall victim) =

German Berlin Wall victim

- Born: 6 June 1914; Berlin, German Empire
- Died: 17 September 1961 (aged 47); Lazarus Krankenhaus, West Berlin, West Germany
- Cause of death: Injuries sustained from jumping from an apartment building in East Berlin to the sidewalk in neighboring West Berlin
- Resting place: Dorotheenstädtischer Friedhof II, Berlin-Wedding.
- Known for: The first escapee from East Berlin who would ultimately die from such an attempted escape.

Page from the 1943 Berliner Adressbuch, with listing for Rudolf Urban, Bernauer Straße 1 (left column, bottom half)

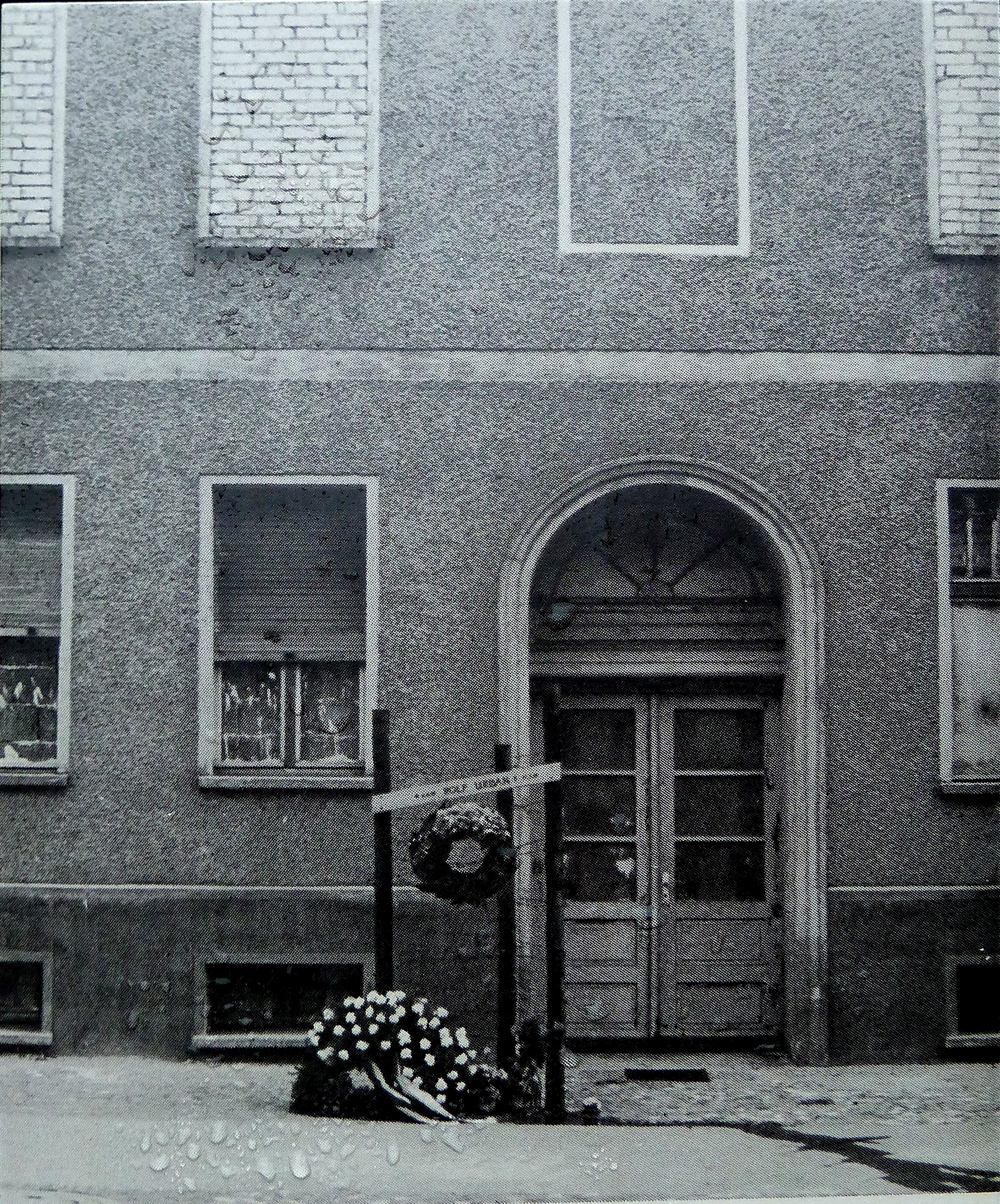
Bernauer Straße 1, as it appeared in June 1962.

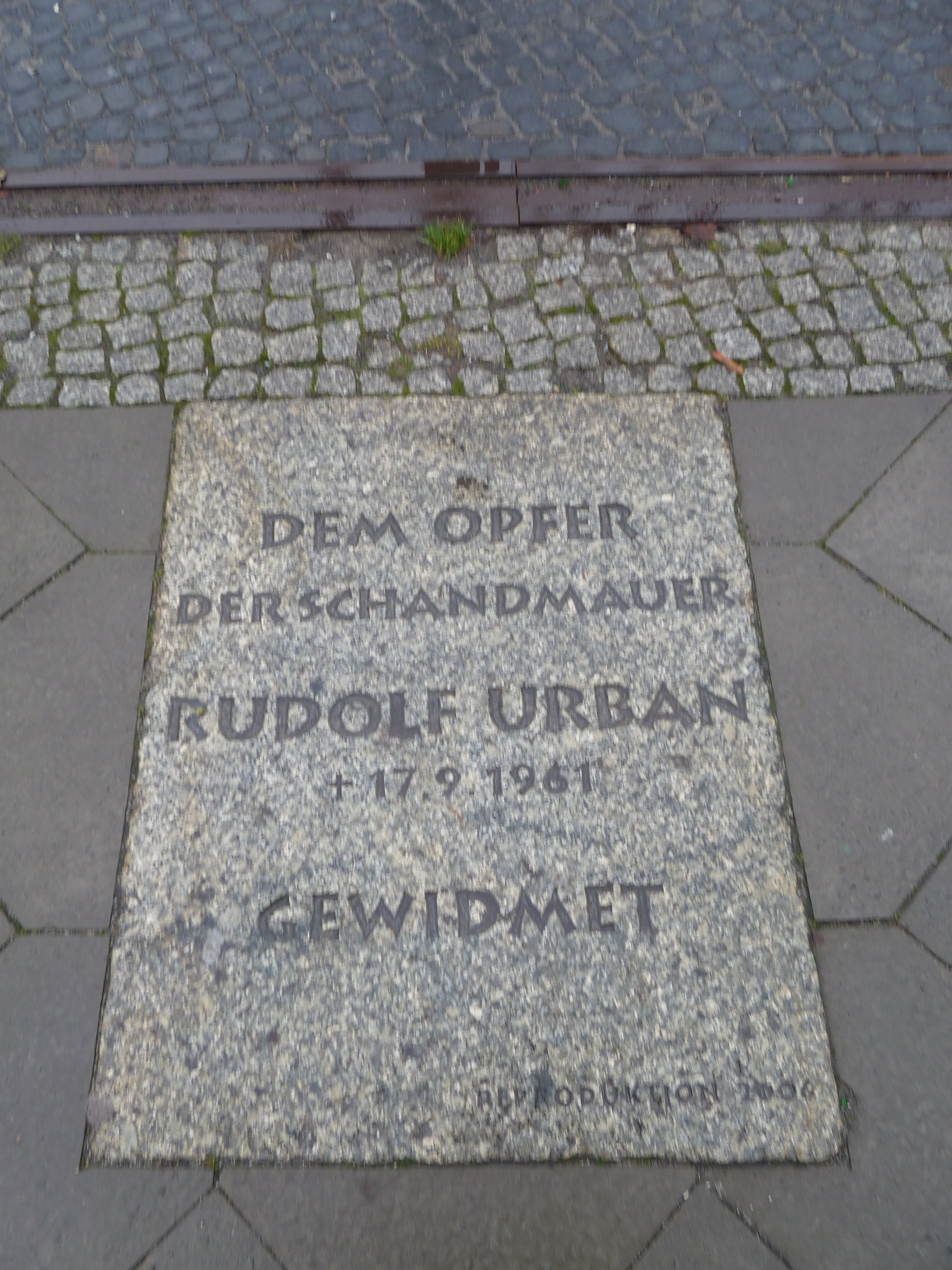
Memorial Tablet where Bernauer Straße 1 once was, "dedicated to the victim of the wall of shame, Rudolf Urban, † 17.9.1961

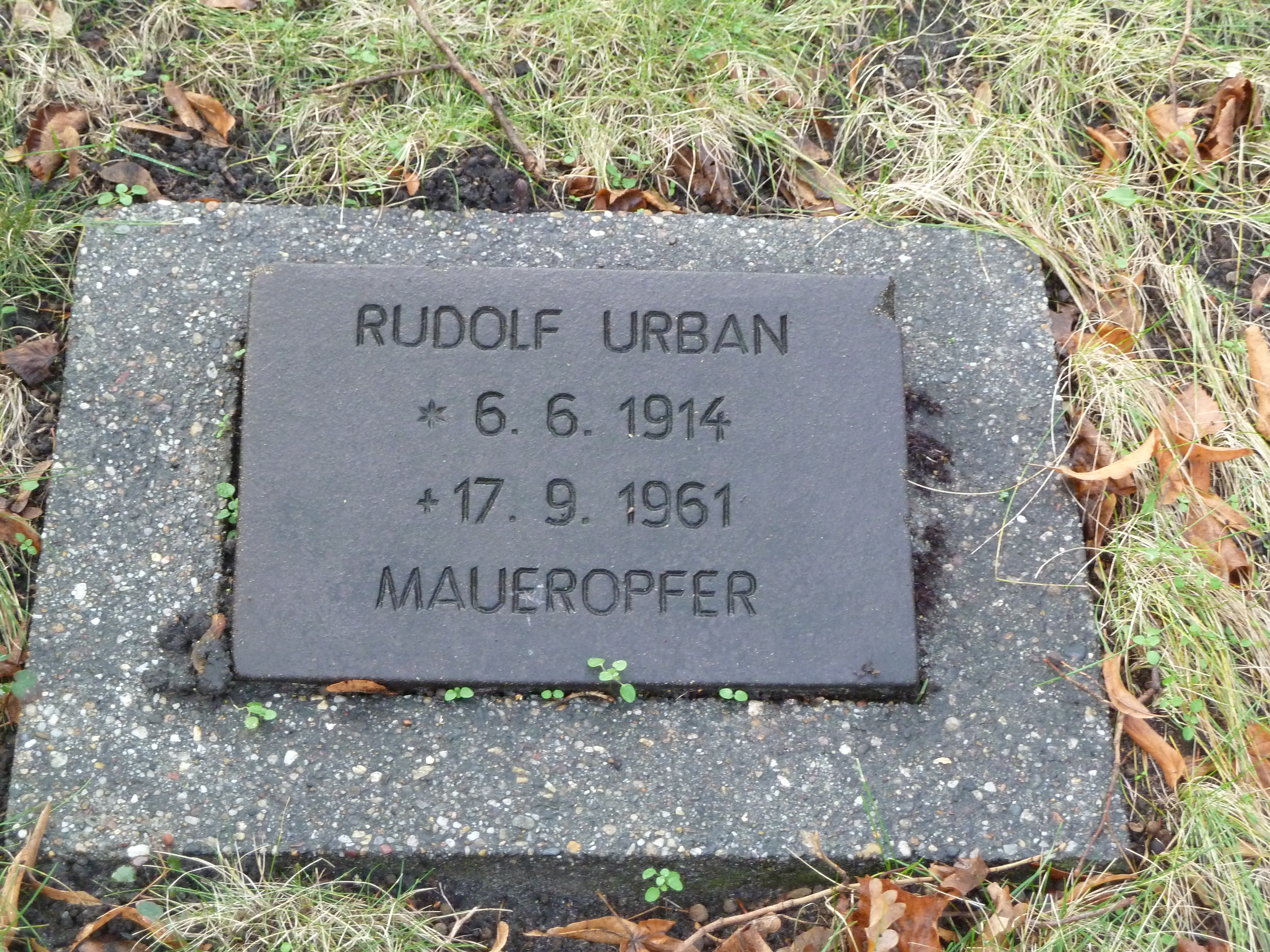
Rudolf Urban's grave, Dorotheenstädtischer Friedhof II, Liesenstraße 9, Berlin.

Rudolf Urban (6 June 1914 in Berlin – 17 September 1961 in West Berlin) was a German man who died as a result of injuries sustained while crossing the Berlin Wall.

== Biography ==
Rudolf Urban, a truck driver, lived with his wife Ilse in his birthplace at Bernauer Straße 1.

== Death ==
After the Second World War, his apartment was physically located in Mitte, in East Berlin, or the Soviet Sector of Berlin, while the entrance to the building and adjacent sidewalk was located in Wedding, in West Berlin, or the French Sector of Berlin. With the construction of the Berlin Wall, border guards were posted in the hallways and entrances, who checked identity documents of those entering the apartments. On the evening of August 18, five days after the erection of the Berlin Wall, the entrance door, and the escape route to West Berlin was bricked and sealed, with alternate entrances established but leading to East Berlin. According to his wife Ilse, this was the deciding factor for her husband, who was previously hesitant about leaving East Berlin. They attempted their escape the following day, accompanied by his friend and his friend's wife, Willy and Irmgard Kutzminski. They chose to rappel from their second floor apartment (by North American standards, first floor/1.Obergeschoss or 1.Stock by European standards), to avoid involving ground floor inhabitants, which could have led to them being accused as accomplices. Both would wind up slipping, and injured themselves at they impacted the sidewalk below. In shock, and having sustained injuries on their hands and feet, and a heel fracture sustained by Rudolf Urban, they were taken to the nearby Lazarus Hospital in West Berlin. Ilse Urban recovered, but Rudolf Urban contracted pneumonia, and died on 17 September 1961.

== Burial ==
Rudolf Urban was the fourth known of at least 140 victims caused by the Berlin Wall, in order of death, but was the first known victim in order of attempted escape. He was buried at the Dorotheenstädtischer Friedhof II. A memorial stone on the Bernauer Straße, near the Swinemünder Straße, which the district office of Wedding 1982 had set up, commemorates his fate and the fate of nine other victims in Bernauer Strasse. His widow, Ilse Urban, was last known to live (in 1985) at Teikeweg 42, in Berlin-Mariendorf.

== See also ==
- List of deaths at the Berlin Wall
- Berlin Crisis of 1961

== Literature ==
- Hans-Hermann Hertle, Maria Nooke: Die Todesopfer an der Berliner Mauer 1961 - 1989 : ein biographisches Handbuch / hrsg. vom Zentrum für Zeithistorische Forschung Potsdam und der Stiftung Berliner Mauer. Links, Berlin 2009, ISBN 978-3-86153-517-1.
