= Dieter Wohlfarth =

Escape helper (1941–1961)

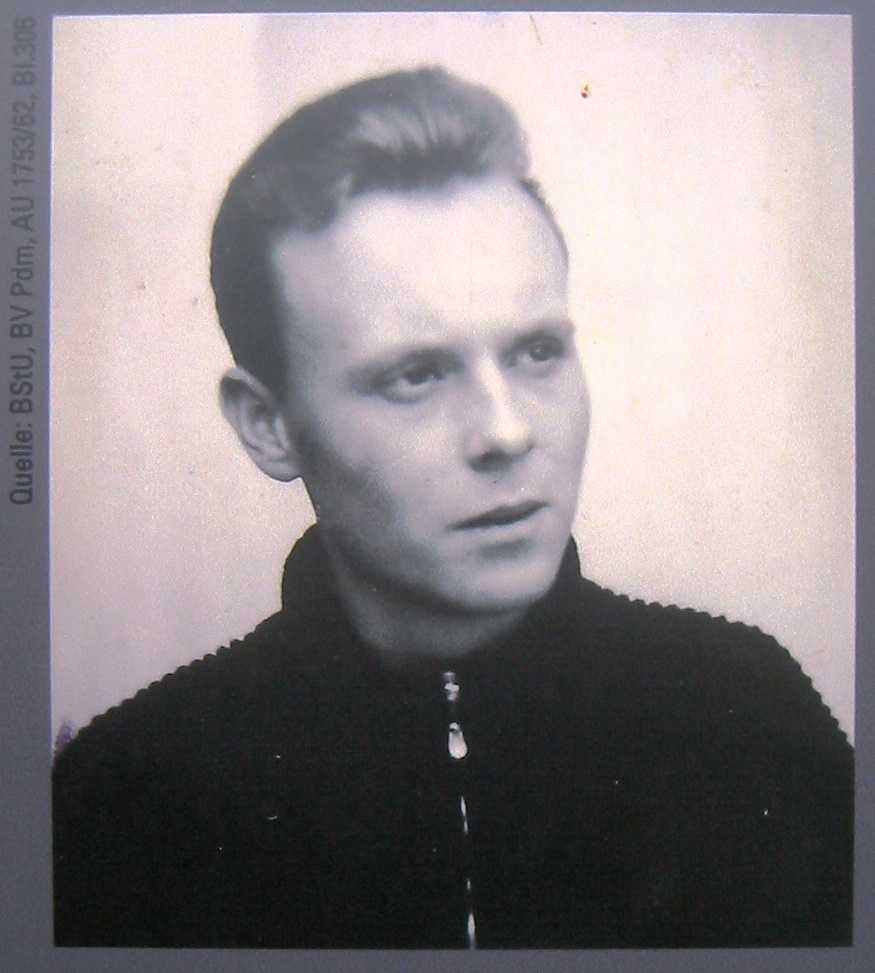

Dieter Wohlfahrt (27 May 1941 in Berlin; died 9 December 1961) was an escape helper and the first non-German and non West Berlin resident to die at the Berlin Wall.

== Life ==
Wohlfahrt grew up in the GDR in Hohen Neuendorf. After high school he studied from 1961 chemistry at Technische Universität Berlin. Through his father he had the Austrian citizenship. Because of his nationality he could move freely between the two parts of Berlin and used this opportunity to help students to escape. At first he helped them to escape through the sewers until blocking measures made this impossible. Then he started to cut holes in the border fence at secluded places.

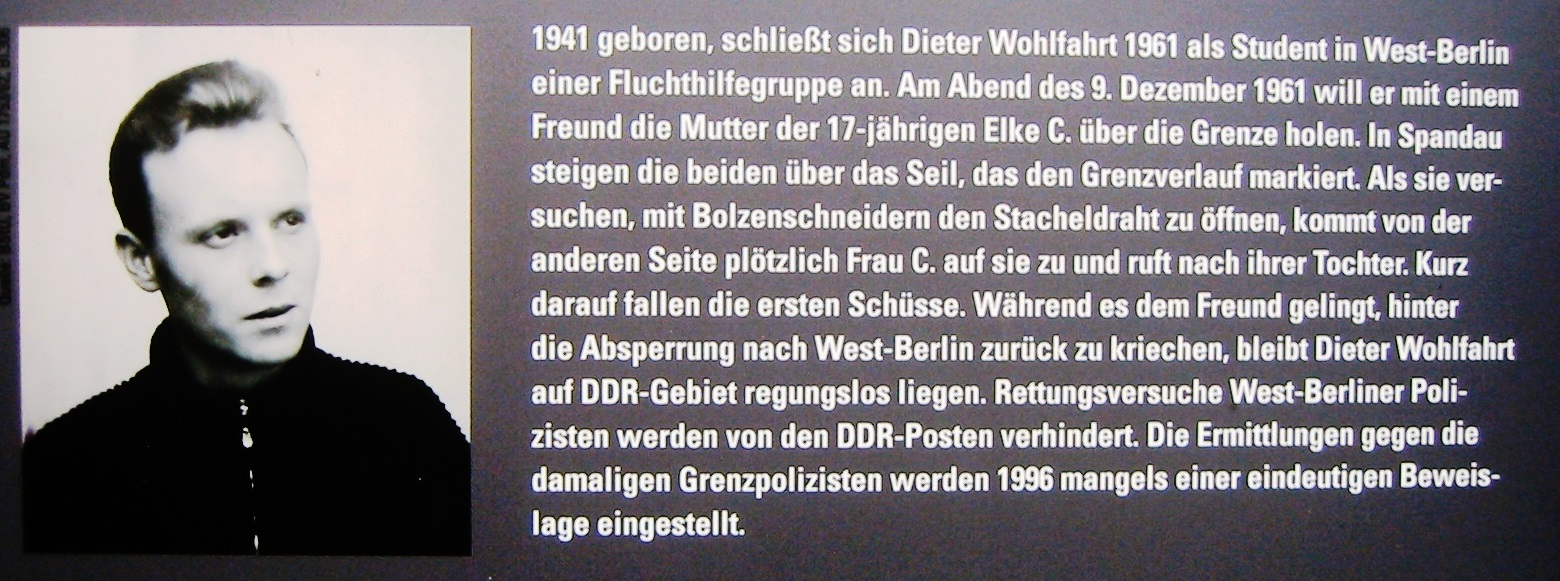
Berlin-Staaken Finkenkruger Weg Dieter Wohlfahrt with description of what happened

== Death ==
On 9 December 1961 he cut, along with others, a hole in a fence between Staaken and Spandau, to help the mother of an acquaintance to the appointed escape. However, the mother had betrayed the plans to the authorities of the GDR. The GDR border guards shot at Wohlfahrth and his companions. Wohlfahrt was hit by a bullet in his chest and remained in the border area for one hour without medical care before succumbing to his injuries.

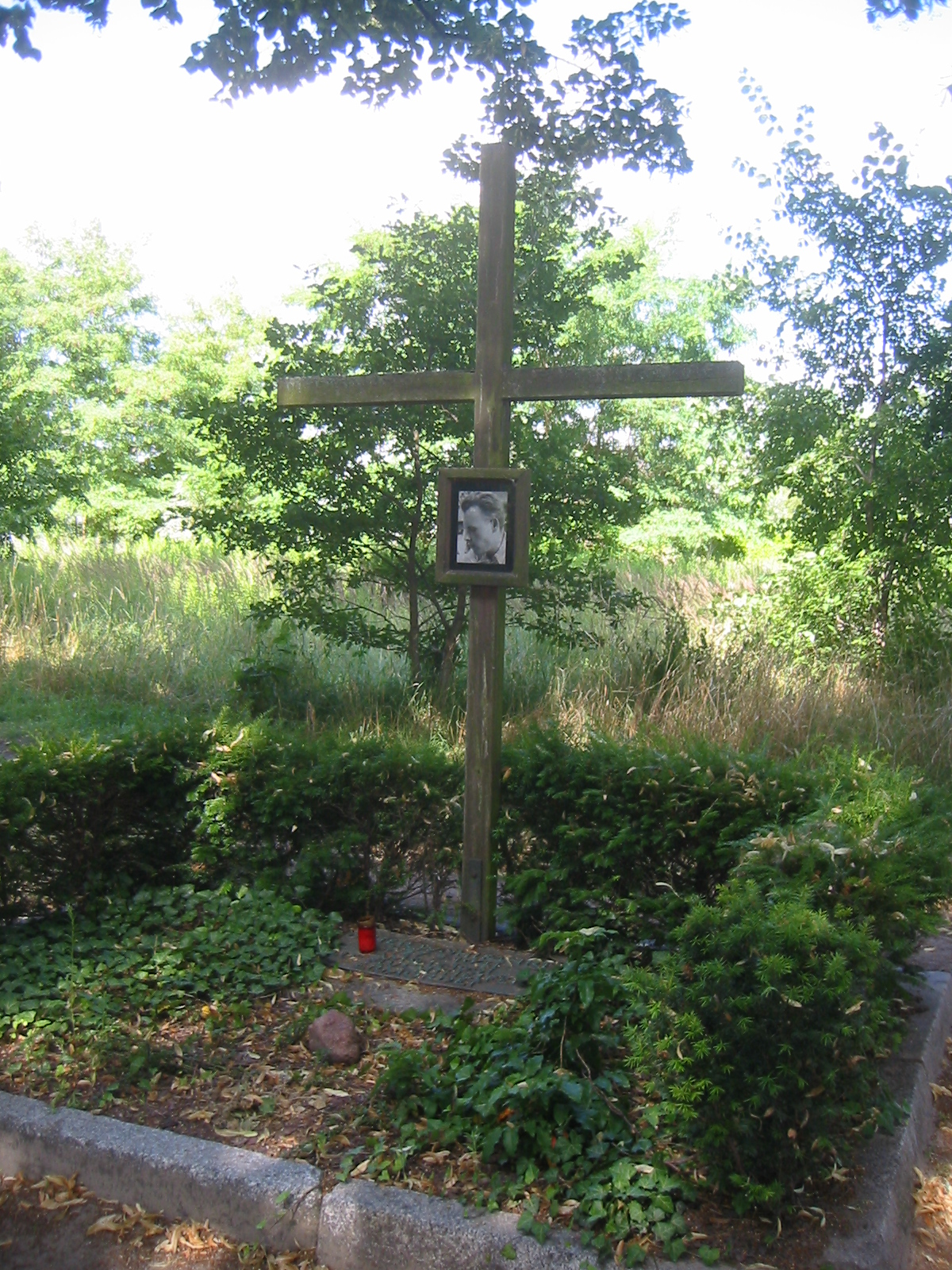
Berlin-Spandau Victim of the wall Dieter Wohlfahrt wooden cross

== Commemoration ==
To commemorate Wohlfahrt a wooden cross was erected directly near the wall with a memorial plaque and a photo in Berlin-Spandau.

== See also ==
- List of deaths at the Berlin Wall
- Berlin Crisis of 1961

== Literature ==
- Brecht, Christine: Dieter Wohlfahrt, in: Die Todesopfer an der Berliner Mauer 1961–1989, Links, Berlin 2009, S. 60–63.

== Links ==
- Media related to Dieter Wohlfahrt at Wikimedia Commons
- Kurzportrait on www.chronik-der-mauer.de
