= Olga Segler =

Both one of the earliest and the oldest victims of the Berlin Wall

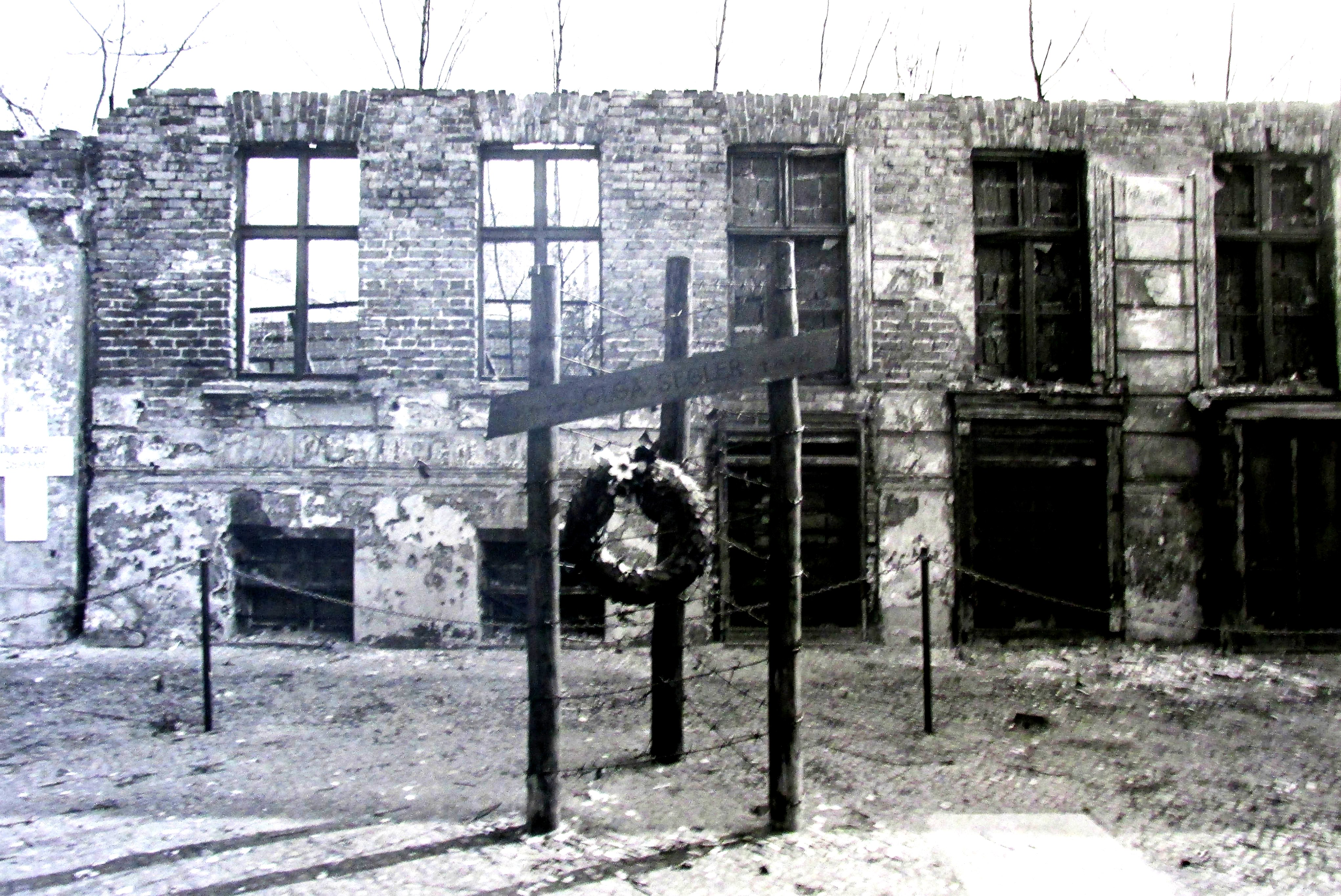
Facade of Olga Segler's former residence at Bernauer Strasse 32, Berlin, mid 1970's

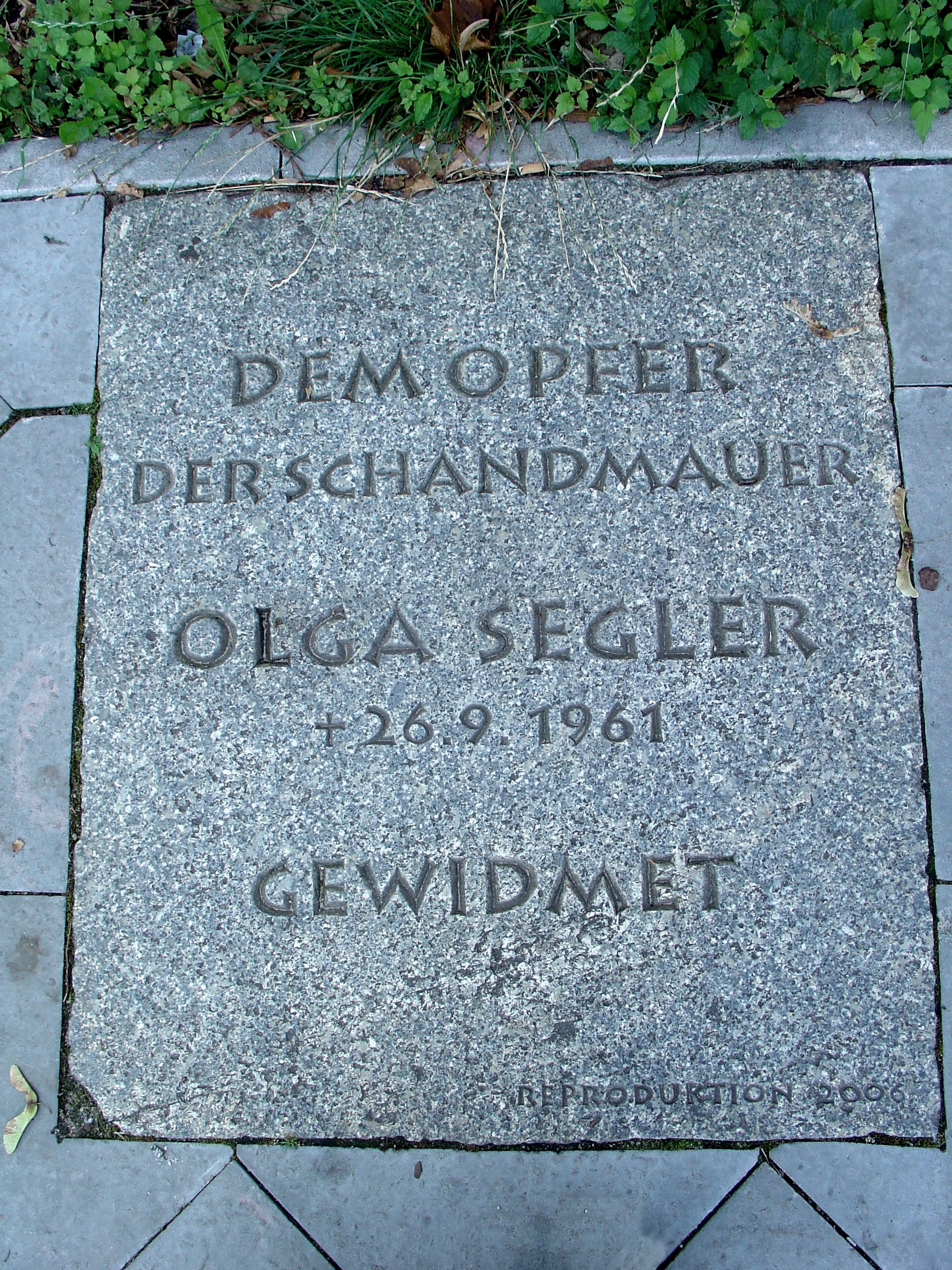
Memorial Tablet to Olga Segler (Schandmauer=Wall of shame)

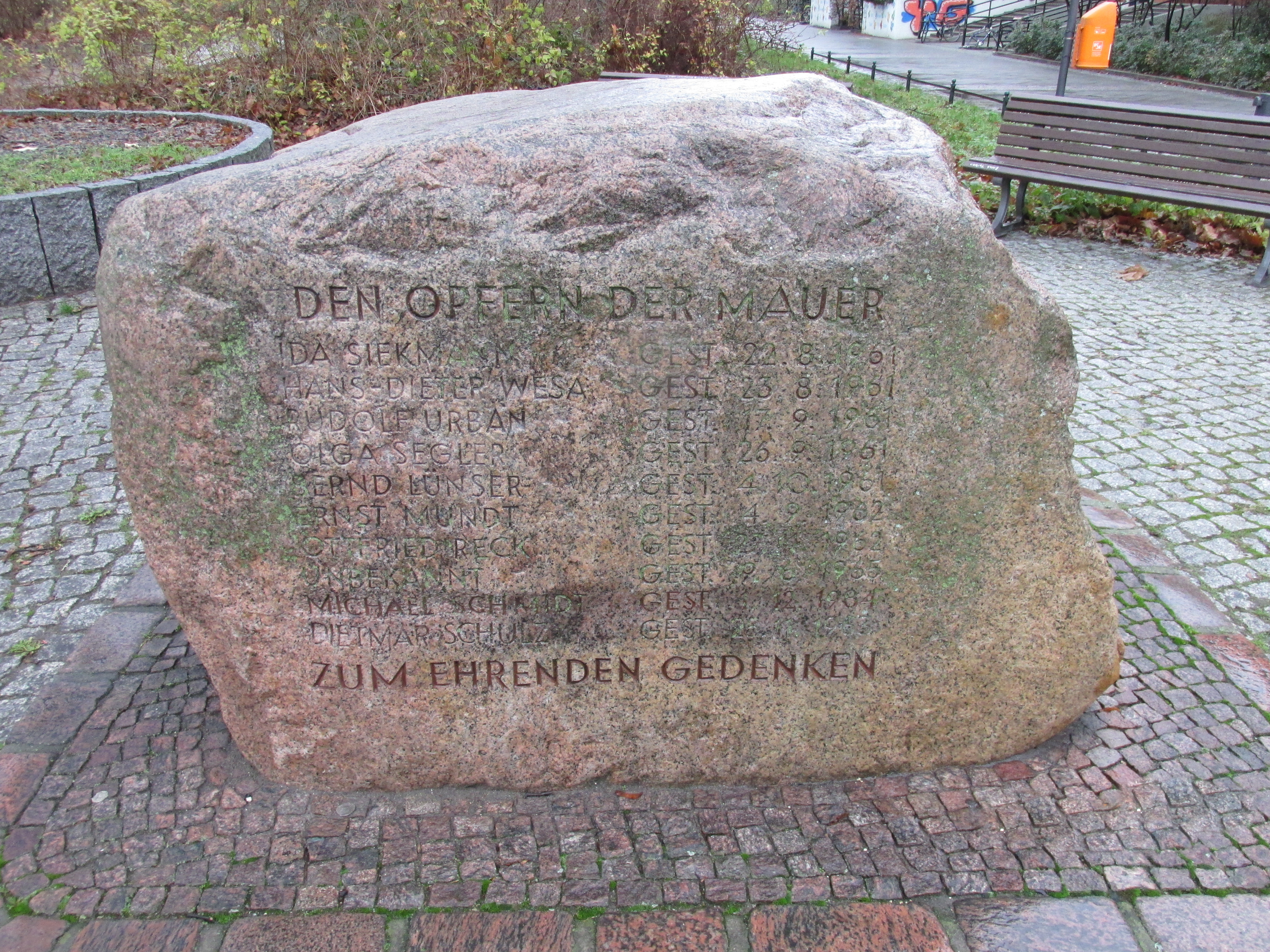
Memorial stone to Bernauer Straße victims of the Berlin wall, including Olga Segler.

Olga Segler (31 July 1881 – 26 September 1961) was a German woman who died of injuries as a result of crossing the Berlin Wall.

According to the Centre for Contemporary History (ZZF), Segler was both one of the earliest victims of the Berlin Wall and the oldest victim, aged 80 years old at the time of her death. Additionally, Segler was one of only eight women who was either killed at the Berlin wall, or died as a result of crossing it, among the total of at least 140 victims.

== Background ==
Olga Segler was born on 31 July 1881 in Prischt, now in Ukraine, into an ethnic German family. No other official documents providing information about her life exist, but by 1961 at the age of 80-years-old lived in Berlin, on the second floor (by European standards, third floor by North American standards) of Bernauer Straße 34. The building itself was located in the district of Mitte in East Berlin, part of East Germany, however it lay directly along the border with the district of Wedding in West Berlin, part of West Germany. The sidewalk and street adjacent to the building were situated in Wedding, where Segler's daughter was living.

On 13 August 1961 East Germany began construction of the Berlin Wall without warning, sealing the border between Mitte and Wedding, effectively separating Segler and her daughter. Residents of Bernauer Straße were placed under constant observation by East German authorities, who deemed it a "focal point of border breaches" with buildings along the street being barricaded and their hallways patrolled by watch guards.

== Death ==
On 24 September 1961, just over a month later, East German authorities began a forced evacuation of Bernauer Straße residents. People on the West Berlin side expected the residents to make attempts to flee and lined the street outside Segler's window, including Segler's daughter. The following day Segler jumped from her window into a life net which was prepared by the West Berlin firefighters. However, as a result of her jump, she suffered a back injury and was taken by ambulance to the nearby Lazarus Hospital. Segler later died of a heart attack caused by over-excitement from the jump. Her funeral took place at the municipal cemetery in Berlin-Reinickendorf.

== Aftermath ==
In 1962, a memorial was erected at outside Bernauer Straße 34 to commemorate Segler's death. In September 1982, the district office of Wedding established a memorial stone adjacent to Swinemünder Straße, to commemorate Olga Segler, along with other victims of the Berlin Wall, most of whom died on Bernauer Straße; these also included Ida Siekmann, Hans-Dieter Wesa, Rudolf Urban, Bernd Lünser, Ernst Mundt, Otfried Reck, Dietmar Schulz and, still unknown in 1982, the victims Dieter Brandes and Michael-Horst Schmidt. The district office of Wedding also placed a memorial tablet for Olga Segler in front of where her residence once stood, at Bernauer Straße 34.

== See also ==
- List of deaths at the Berlin Wall
- Berlin Crisis of 1961
