= Ackerstraße =

Street in Berlin, Germany

- Ackerstrasse
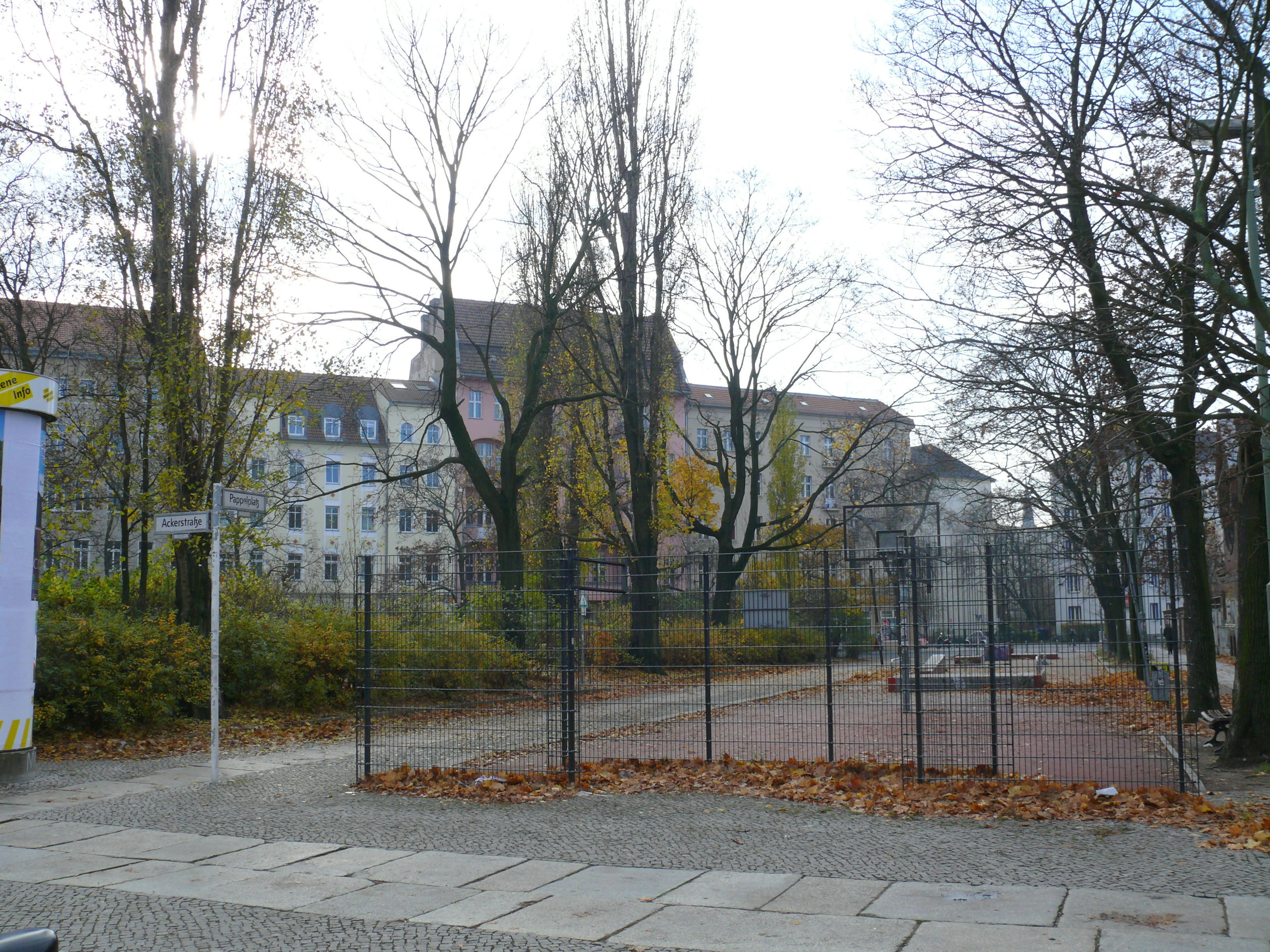
- Pappelplatz, the square at the bend in the Ackerstraße
- Interactive map of Ackerstraße
- Former names: Zweite Reihe im Neuen Voigtland, and later; Dritte Reihe im Neuen Voigtland; (c. 1752–1801)
- Type: Street
- Length: c. 1,800 m (5,900 ft)
- Location: Berlin, Germany
- Quarter: Mitte, Gesundbrunnen
- Nearest metro station: Rosenthaler Platz; Bernauer Straße; Humboldthain
- Coordinates: 52°32′07″N 13°23′25″E
- South end: Linienstraße
- Major junctions: Torstraße; Invalidenstraße; Bernauer Straße
- Northwest end: Liesenbrücken; Scheringstraße; Liesenstraße; Gartenstraße/Gerichtstraße

Construction
- Construction start: mid-18th century
- Completion: 1877

Ackerstraße, or Ackerstrasse (see ß), is a street in Berlin which runs northwest from near the Liesenstraße – Scheringstraße traffic circle in Gesundbrunnen to Invalidenstraße, where it turns south, terminating at the Linienstraße in Mitte.

== History ==
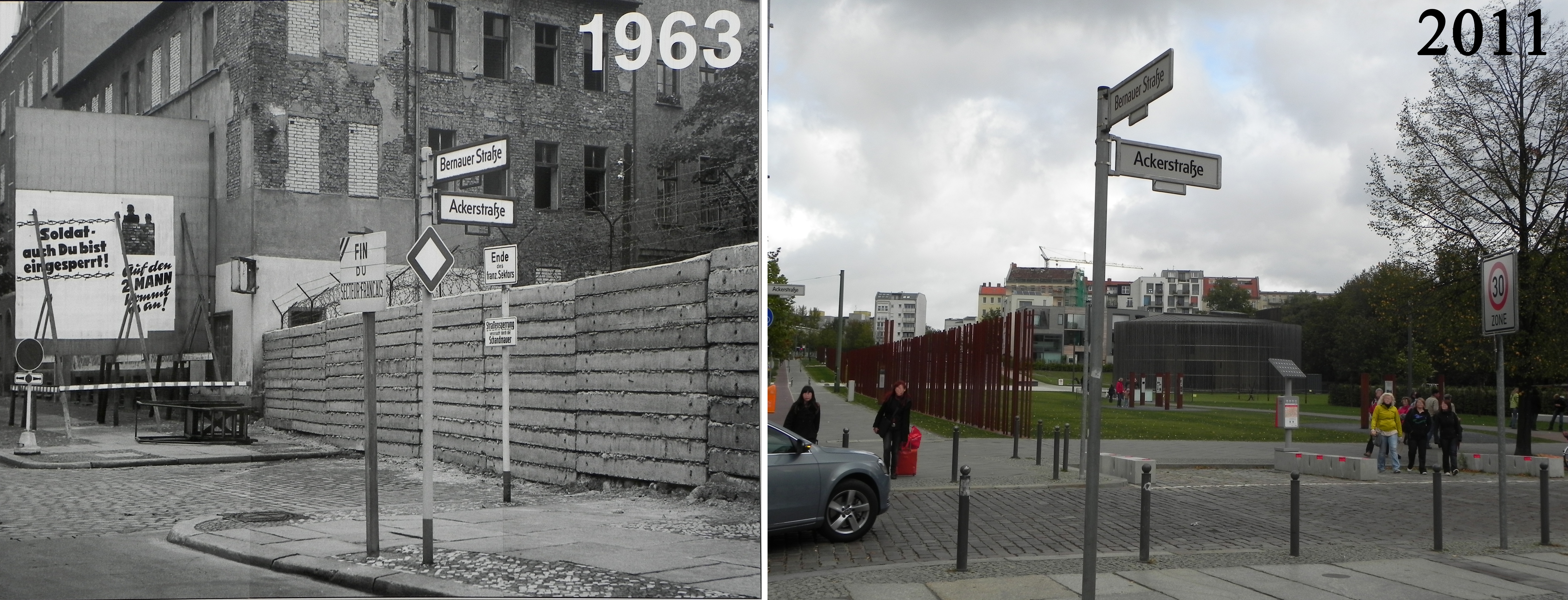
Corner of Bernauer Straße and Ackerstraße photographed in 1963 and 2011

On 22 September 1751, Lieutenant General Hans Christoph Friedrich Graf von Hacke, commandant of the city of Berlin, received orders from King Frederick II of Prussia to build houses outside the city Customs Wall between the Hamburg Gate and the Rosenthal Gate. Initially 30 houses were to be built, to house 60 families selected from applicants. The objective was to have the craftsmen stay year-round in Berlin rather than leaving each winter. The new residents were mostly from Vogtland; as a result the new area of settlement came to be called Neuvoigtland (New Vogtland). The streets were laid out in parallel straight lines and were designated numerically; what is now the Ackerstraße was the middle street and was originally called the Zweite Reihe (second row), and became the Dritte Reihe (third row) when the local population increased in the 19th century and new streets were added. The district was divided into identical land parcels with approximately 10.5 metres (34 ft) frontages and to save money and time, the original houses were standardised; this set a new trend. Gardens were laid out between them, but the population increase led to extension of the buildings as the area became more urban.

The area changed name to Rosenthaler Vorstadt, and the local residents petitioned the police for street names to be assigned. On 18 February 1801 the "third row" was renamed Ackerstraße (Field Street), probably because the development was in the farming area outside the city, the Feldmark. On 6 April 1833, the continuation of the same street, from Invalidenstraße to Liesenstraße, was named Neue Ackerstraße (New Ackerstraße). The southern extension to Koppenplatz was added in 1877. The residents there preferred the name Virchowstraße, but their request was denied.

The St. Elisabeth Cemetery near the midpoint of the street was dedicated in 1844 and is still in operation.

In the 1870s and 1880s, the character of the street was greatly changed with the building of tenements. The Ackerhöfe at numbers 14–15, unusual in occupying two of the original land parcels, are a restored complex of tenements built in four phases between 1867 and 1911, the last phase representing an attempt at housing reform. The most notorious tenement in Berlin, Meyers Hof, was at number 132. One of the original covered markets of Berlin, now known as the Ackerhalle, was built on the corner with Invalidenstraße in 1886–88 and is still in use; it is the only one that retains its original façade.

19 historic buildings on the street are protected historic monuments of the city of Berlin: 1–5, 10–13, 16/17, 19–22, 144–147, 154/155, 165, and 171.

From 1961 to 1989, the Berlin Wall divided the city. It ran along Bernauer Straße, and required closing a section of Ackerstraße at the corner with that street, which fell within the "death strip"; a church in this part of Ackerstraße, the Versöhnungskirche (Church of Reconciliation), was dynamited by the East German authorities in 1985. In commemoration of the Wall and those who died attempting to cross it, a portion of the main and inner walls and the "death strip" are preserved on Bernauer Straße at the corner of Ackerstraße as part of the Gedenkstätte Berliner Mauer (Berlin Wall Memorial); 212 metres (696 ft) of the border strip along Bernauer Straße between Ackerstraße and Bergstraße were made a protected landmark on 2 October 1990 and this is now the last genuine remnant of the Wall.

== In literature ==
- The novel Das Mädchen aus der Ackerstraße (the girl from the Ackerstraße) is set in the area in the 19th century, when it was an impoverished neighbourhood. It was filmed in 1919–20 in three parts directed by Reinhold Schünzel and Werner Funck with cinematography by Kurt Kurant (Curt Courant).
- The protagonists of Klaus Kordon's Trilogie der Wendepunkte, a trilogy of novels for teenagers in which a family lives through the end of both World Wars, Die roten Matrosen, Mit dem Rücken zur Wand, and Der erste Frühling, live in the Ackerstraße.
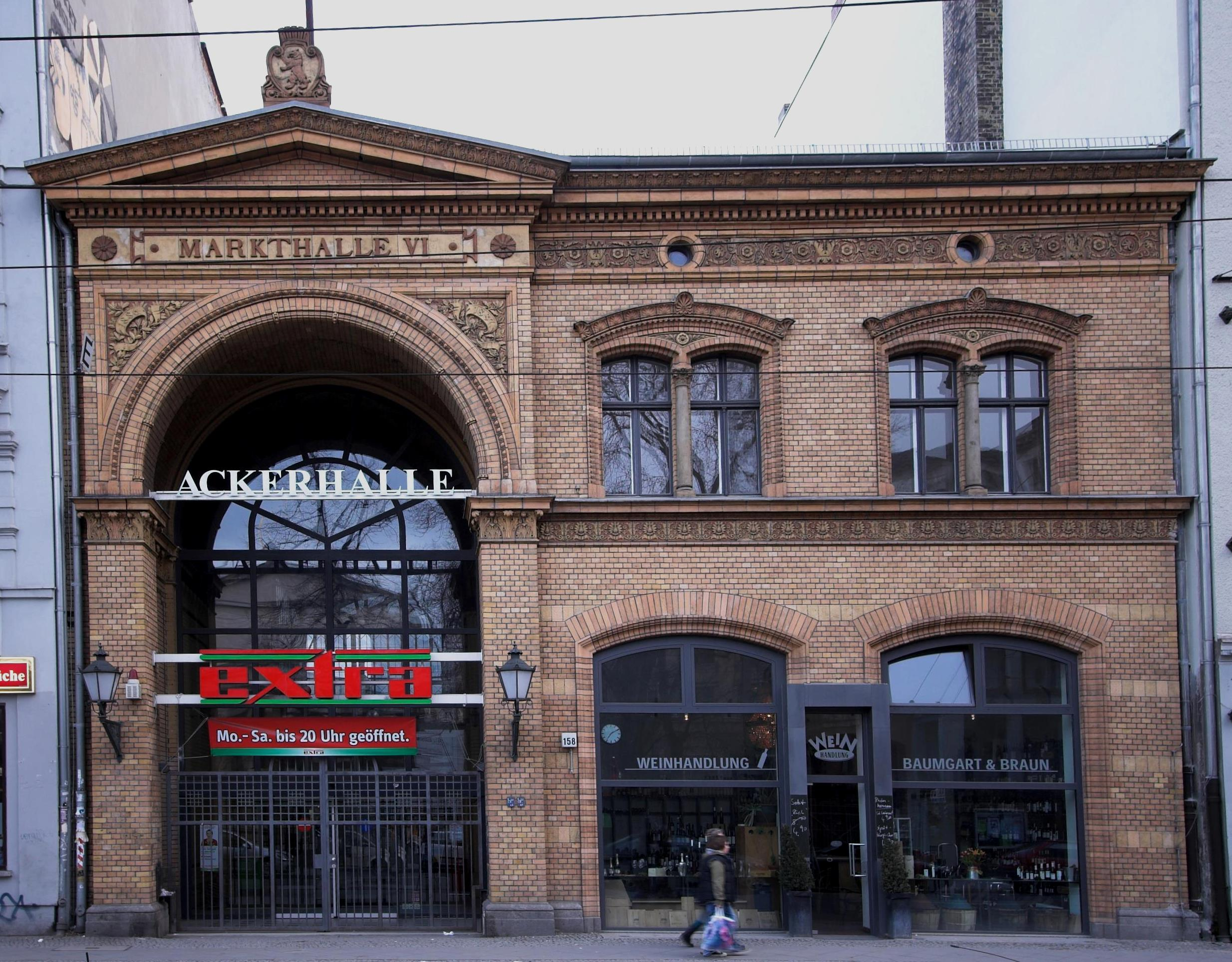
Ackerhalle, late 19th-century market hall at Ackerstraße and Invalidenstraße

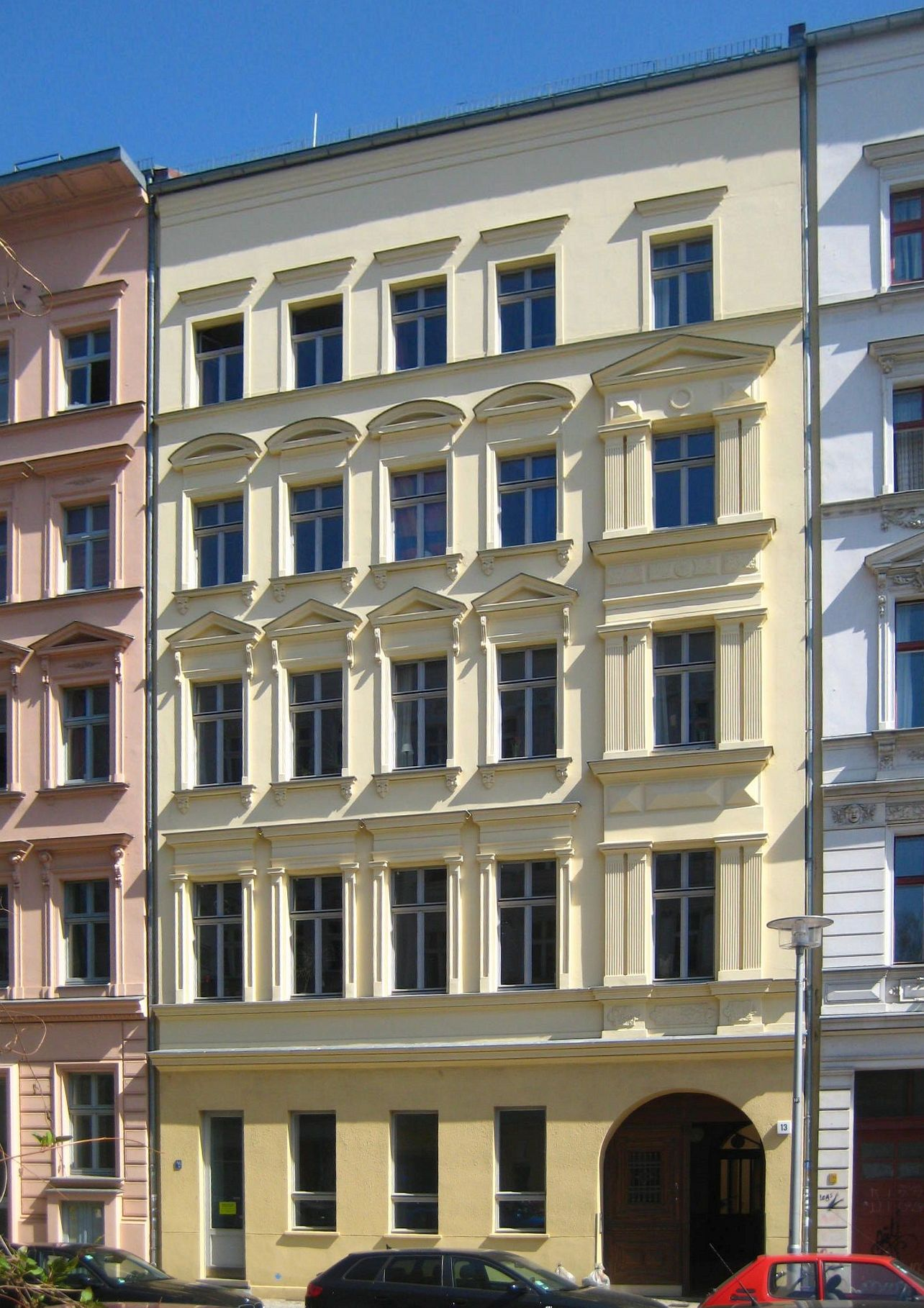
Former tenement at number 13, one of the protected historic landmarks in Ackerstraße

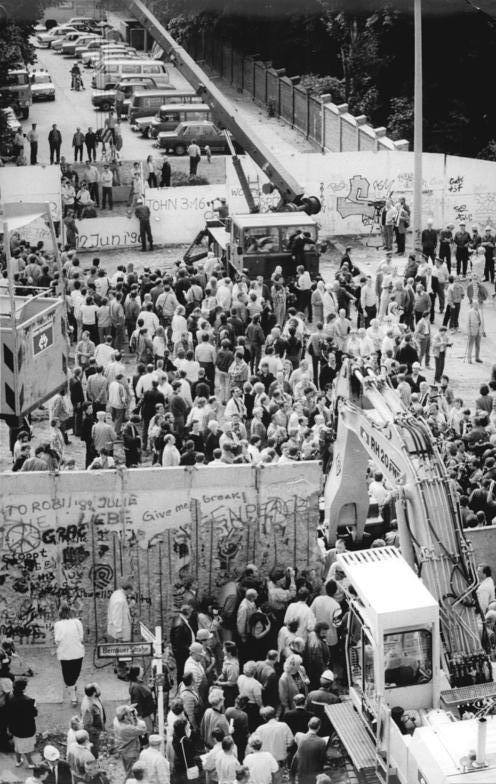
Demolition of the Berlin Wall at the corner of Bernauer Straße and Ackerstraße in 1990

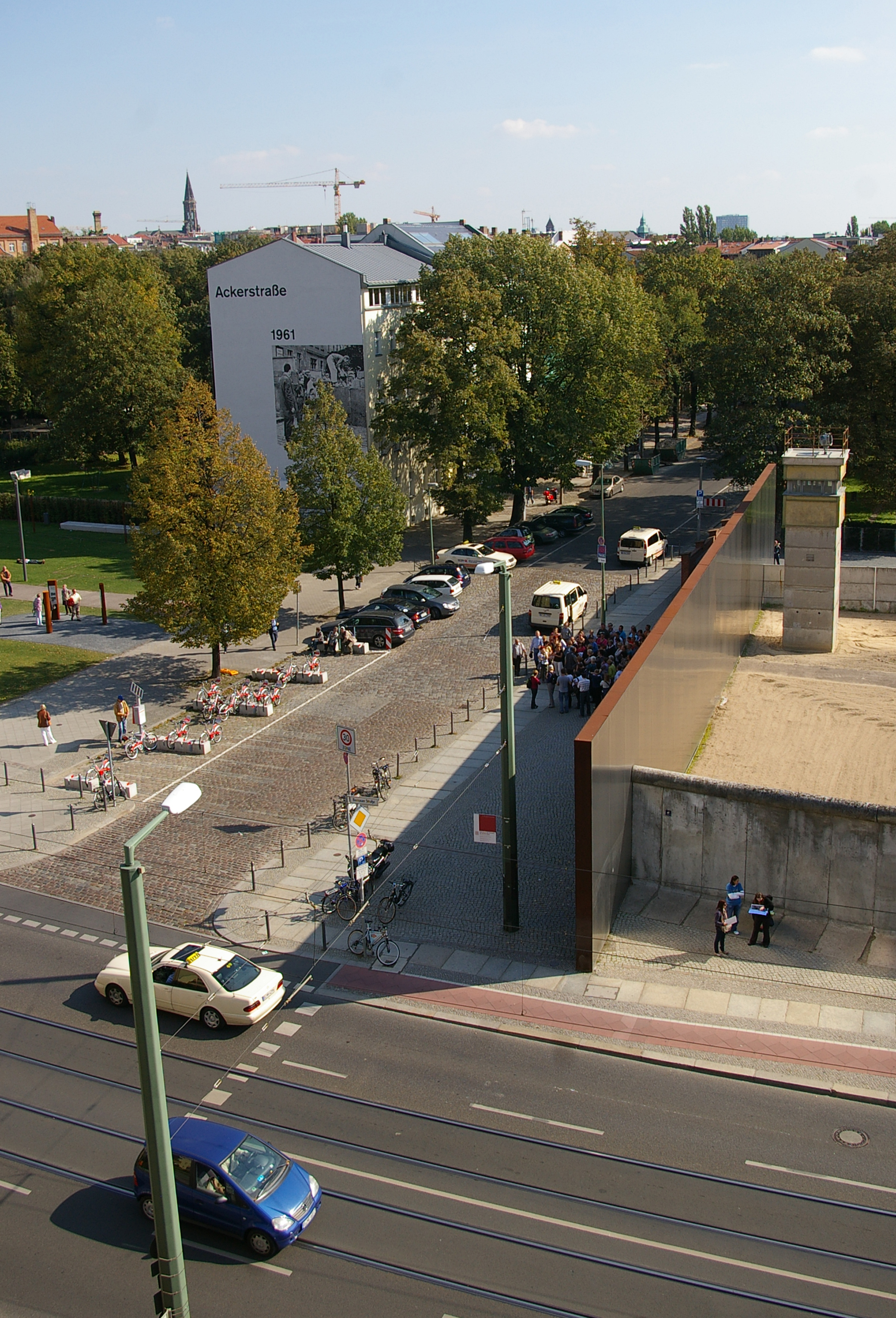
Section of the street as part of the Gedenkstätte Berliner Mauer, photographed in 2011
