= Bernauer Straße =

Street in Berlin

- Bernauer Strasse
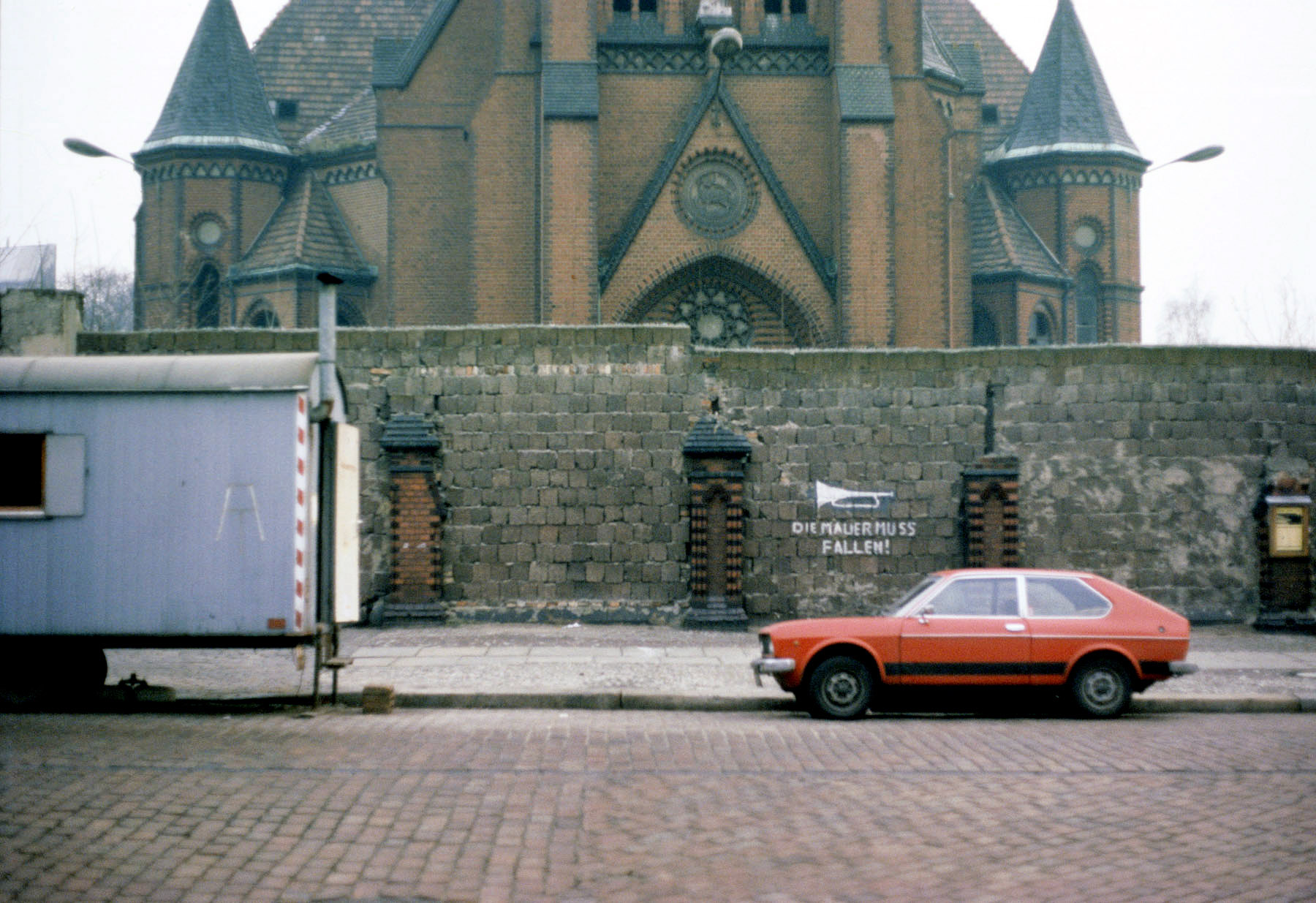
- Bernauer Straße in 1978: Walled up Versöhnungskirche (Reconciliation Church Versöhnungskirche (Berlin-Mitte)), demolished 1985; replaced by the Kapelle der Versöhnung (Chapel of Reconciliation) in 2000
- Interactive map of Bernauer Straße
- Former names: Straße Nr. 50, and later; Straße Nr. 80; (to 1862)
- Namesake: Bernau bei Berlin
- Type: Street
- Length: c. 1,380 m (4,530 ft)
- Location: Berlin, Germany
- Quarter: Mitte, Gesundbrunnen, Prenzlauer Berg
- Nearest metro station: Nordbahnhof; Bernauer Straße; Eberswalder Straße
- Coordinates: 52°32′15″N 13°23′36″E
- Southwest end: Julie-Wolfthorn-Straße; Gartenstraße
- Major junctions: Bergstraße; Ackerstraße; Hussitenstraße; Strelitzer Straße; Brunnenstraße; Wolgaster Straße; Ruppiner Straße; Swinemünder Straße; Wolliner Straße
- Northeast end: Schwedter Straße; Oderberger Straße; Eberswalder Straße

Bernauer Straße, or Bernauer Strasse (see ß), is a street of Berlin situated between the localities of Gesundbrunnen and Mitte, today both belonging to the Mitte borough. It runs from the Mauerpark at the corner of Prenzlauer Berg to the Nordbahnhof. The street's name refers to the town of Bernau bei Berlin, situated in Brandenburg.

When Berlin was a divided city, the Berlin Wall erected in 1961 ran along this street. Bernauer Straße became famous for escapes from windows of apartment blocks in the eastern part of the city, down to the street, which was in the West. Several people died here when the border was first enforced.

== History ==
=== Before the Berlin Wall ===
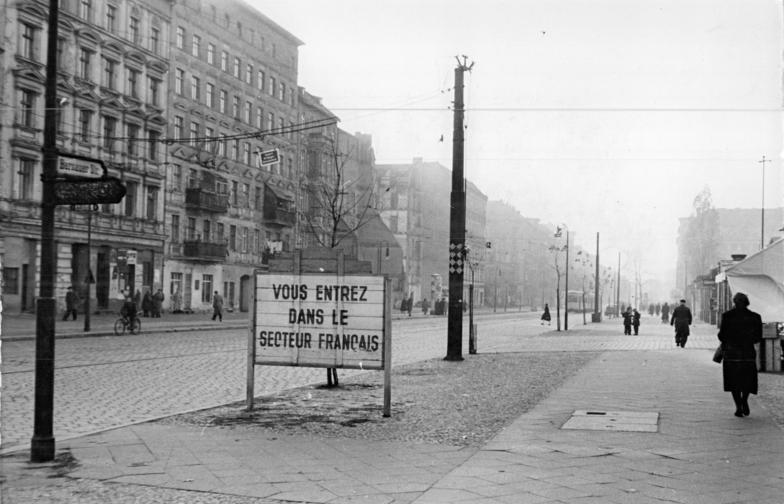
Bernauer Straße in 1955

The Bernauer Straße existed early on as a commercial and military connection road between Berlin and locations in the Margraviate of Brandenburg. It received its present name on 29 May 1862. Prior to this date, it was known as Straße 50, and later Straße 80, prior to being named Bernauer Straße. It led to the northeast from Bergstraße to the triangular intersection of Schwedter Straße and Oderberger Straße. On 4 July 1904 the southwestern extension between Bergstraße and Gartenstraße was completed. With the formation of Greater Berlin in 1920, and the related district division, house numbers 1-50, on the south side of the street, would lie in the district of Mitte, which would later be part of the Soviet sector of Berlin, and house numbers 51-121, on the north side of the street, would lie in the district of Wedding, which would later be part of the French sector of Berlin. The road itself belonged entirely to Wedding, and later to the French sector; this would set the stage for escapes during the Berlin Wall era.

=== Berlin Wall Era ===
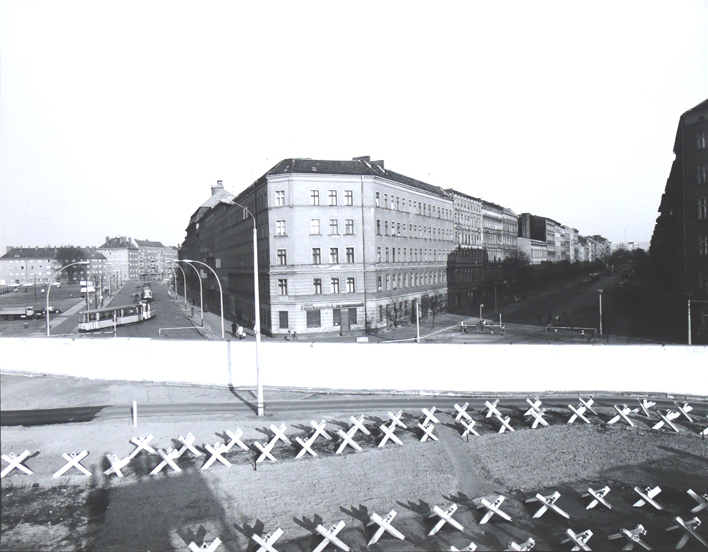
End of Bernauer Straße, looking into Eberswalder Straße and East Berlin, 1973.

Since the street itself belonged to the French sector of West Berlin, the entrances and windows of the houses on the southern side were successively bricked up by the East German border guards and access to the roof was blocked. On 22 August 1961 Ida Siekmann became the first casualty at the Berlin Wall: she died after she jumped out of her window on the third floor (fourth floor by North American reckoning) at Bernauer Straße 48.

By autumn 1961, the last of these houses had been compulsorily emptied and the buildings themselves were demolished in 1963. There is a memorial tablet at the entrance to Swinemünder Straße dedicated to the ten people who are known to have died trying to escape in the area of Bernauer Straße.

The Bernauer Straße U-Bahn station, which served U-Bahn Line D, also suffered from the building of the Berlin Wall. Despite having an entrance onto Bernauer Straße which was located on the border of East and West Berlin, the station itself was located inside East Berlin and became a ghost station with all its entrances sealed off. The entrance from Bernauer Straße became part of the Wall.

Escape tunnels were also dug under the wall in Bernauer Straße. In 1962, one came out at Schönholzer Straße 7 (in the East). 29 East Berliners of all ages crept along the tunnel to West Berlin, unnoticed by the border guards. The NBC News documentary film The Tunnel was a visual account of that operation.

Another tunnel, probably the most famous of all, and later named Tunnel 57, ended at Strelitzer Straße 55 (also in the East) and, over two nights in October 1964, 57 East Germans managed to escape. However, the action was detected and ended with shots exchanged between the border guards and the tunnel diggers. Egon Schultz, a border guard, was killed and thereafter stylised by East German authorities as a martyr murdered on duty by western smugglers. The access to the files after the 1989 Wende revealed that he was killed in an exchange of fire and was hit by bullets from both friend and foe.

The street was also the first location of Rainer Hildebrandt's Mauermuseum before it moved to Haus am Checkpoint Charlie.

=== Fall of the Wall ===
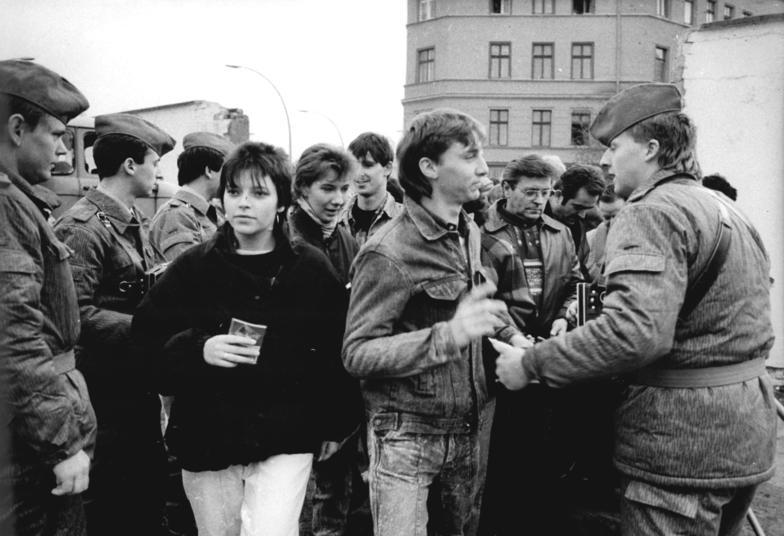
East Berliners waiting for the first opening of the crossing from nearby Eberswalder Straße to Bernauer Straße on 10 November 1989.

After the Berlin Wall was first breached on 9 November 1989, work to create an opening through the wall where it ran across the road between Bernauer Straße and nearby Eberswalder Straße began the following day. The crossing officially opened at 8.00am the next day on 11 November 1989, making it one of the first of the new Berlin Wall border crossings created after the fall of the wall.

The Bernauer Straße U-Bahn station, which had become a ghost station when the Berlin Wall was erected in 1961, resumed operations on 12 April 1990. However, initially only the northern entrance onto Bernauer Straße was opened, while the other entrances which led to East Berlin remained closed until 1 July 1990. On that day, with customs and monetary union between East and West Germany, checkpoints between East and West Berlin were abolished.

The dismantling of this stretch of the Berlin Wall in 1989 was the first time that British soldiers (62 Transport and Movement Squadron, Royal Corps of Transport and Royal Engineers) based in the British Sector had worked directly with the former East German army. Heavy goods vehicles belonging to the transport squadron were provided to carry sections of the concrete wall away to an area near Potsdam.

The street has been rebuilt as a main road, with a tram line. However, few of the cleared plots on the south side have so far been built on again.

== Memorial ==
After the Wall came down, Bernauer Straße was the location of one of the longer preserved sections. In 1999, part of it was turned into a memorial park, the Gedenkstätte Berliner Mauer, with a recreation of actual border fortifications. Germany's official 50th anniversary commemoration was held here on 13 August 2011.

== Gallery ==
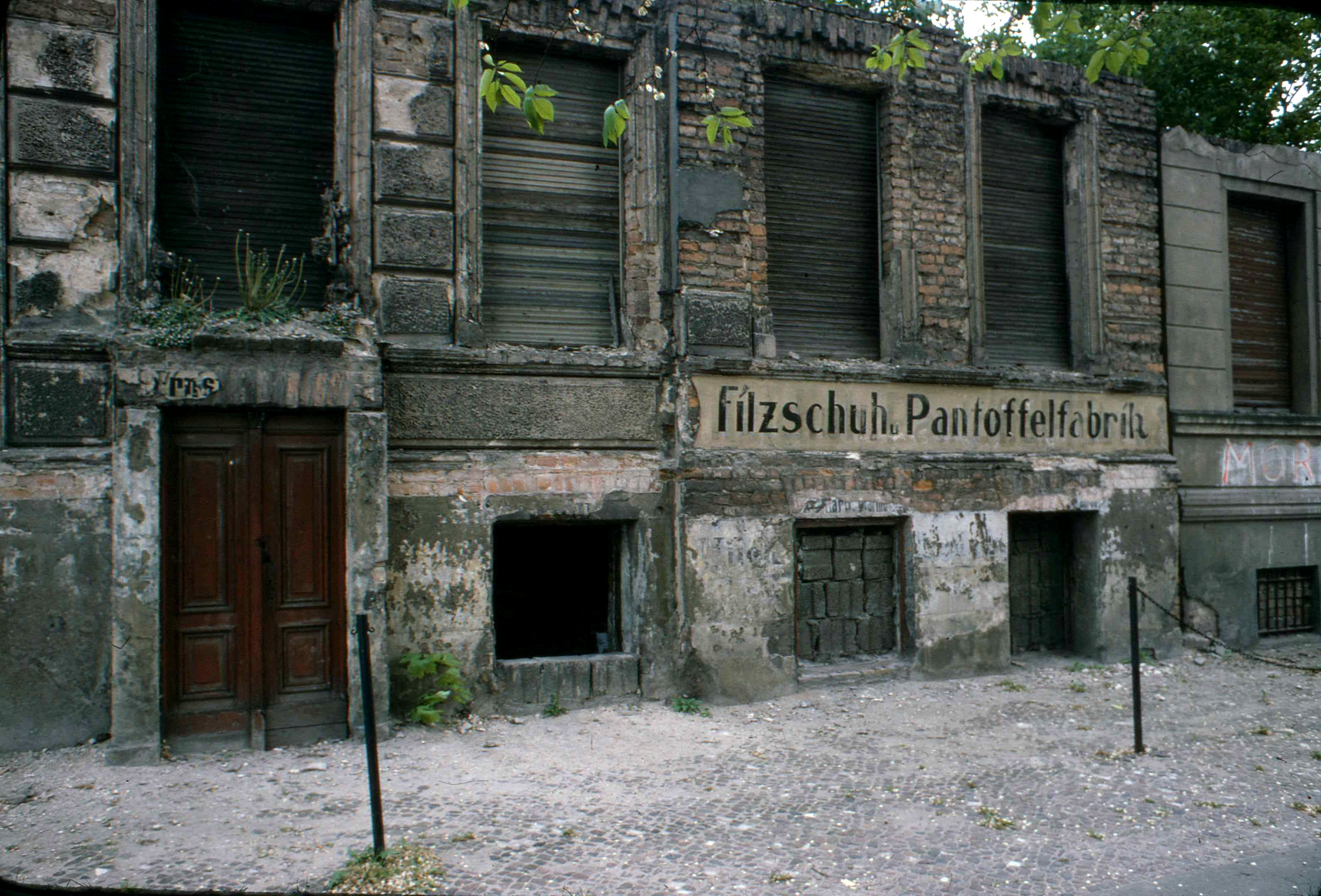
Windows and doors of apartments fronting Bernauer Straße were bricked up before they were torn down, and replaced with the Berlin Wall. The apartments were in East Berlin while their doors and windows opened into West Berlin.

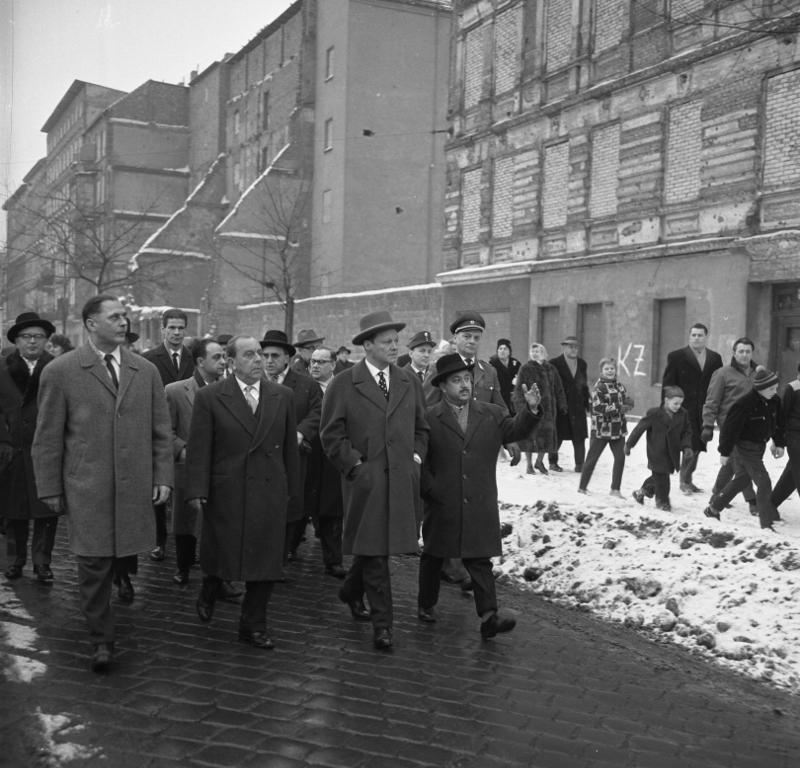
1963, West Berlin Mayor Willy Brandt with Cypriot Vice President Fazıl Küçük: the apartment blocks have been walled up.

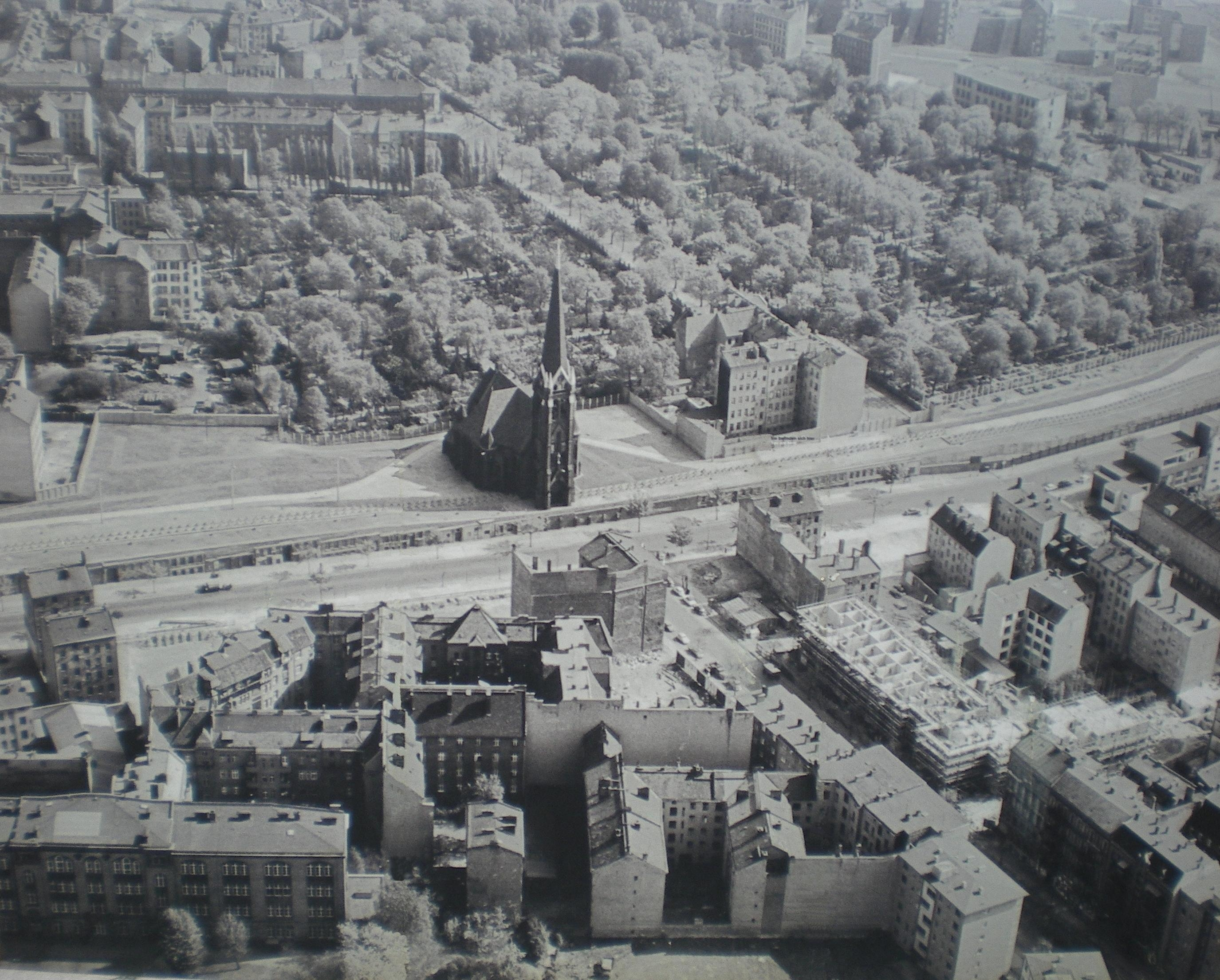
Aerial view of Bernauer Straße showing the Wall and the "Death strip" behind the Wall inside East Berlin. Just inside East Berlin is the Versöhnungskirche or Church of Reconciliation which was later demolished.

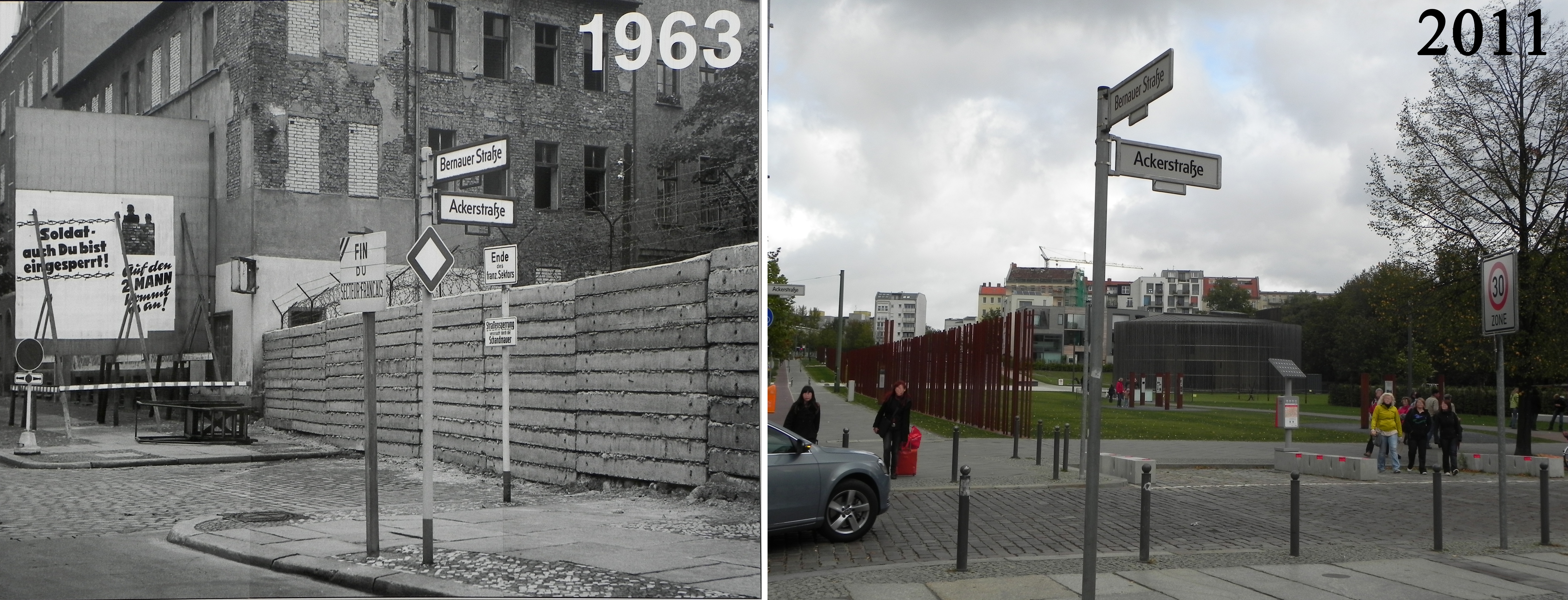
The Wall at the junction of Ackerstraße in 1963 (left) and 2011.

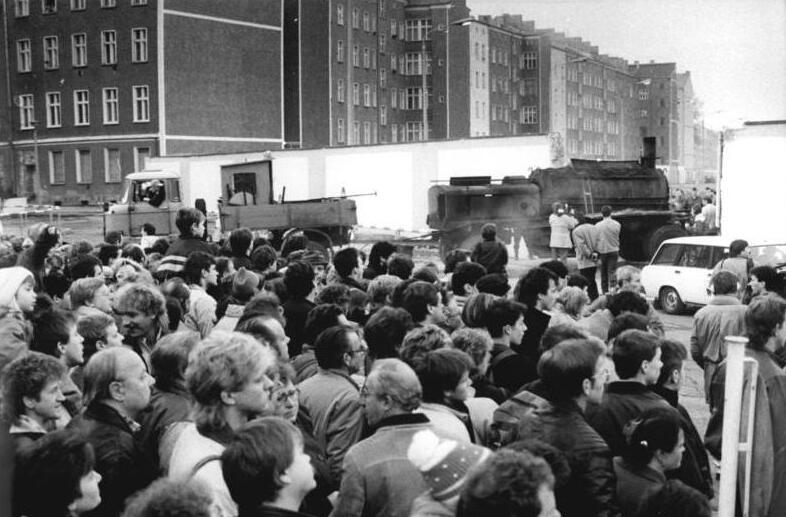
A large crowd looking at road construction work in preparation for the border crossing between West Berlin (front of picture) and East Berlin (behind the wall) on 11 November 1989.

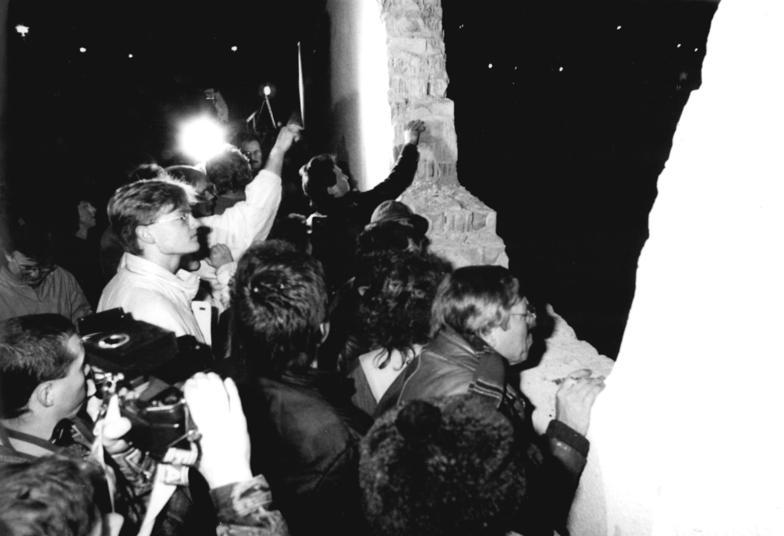
The crowd looking at work to create the opening on the Berlin Wall for the border crossing on the night of 10 November 1989. The crossing was opened at 8am the next day.

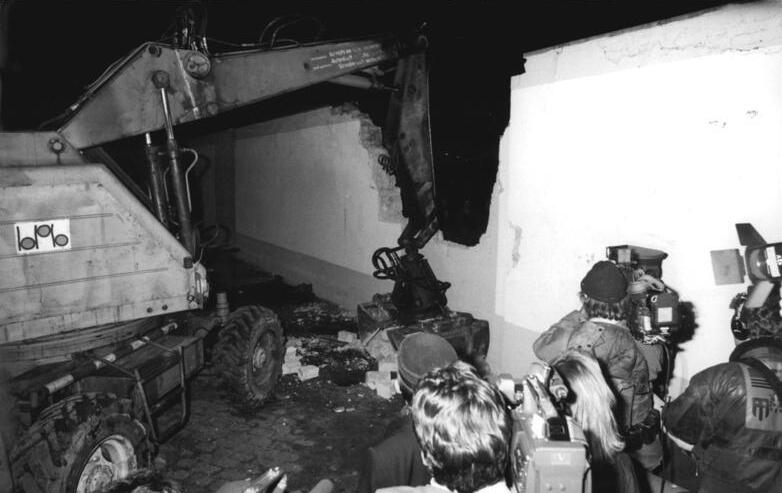
Work to create the border crossing on the evening of 10 November 1989. The crossing was opened at 8am the next day.

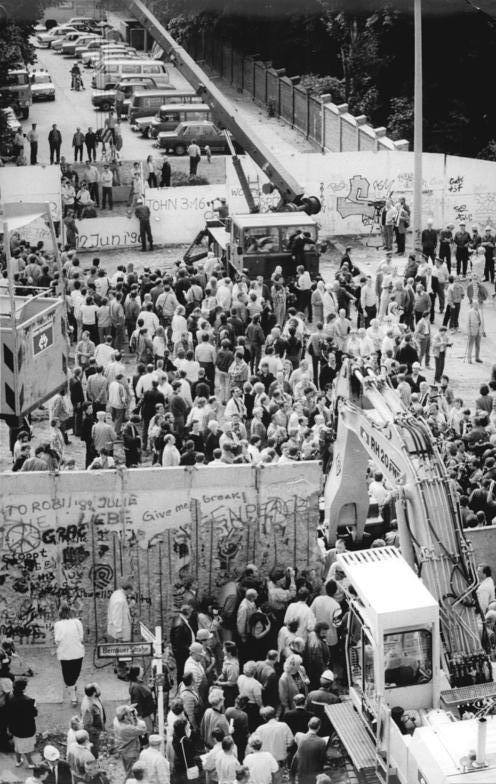
Demolition of the Berlin Wall at the junction with Ackerstraße in June 1990.

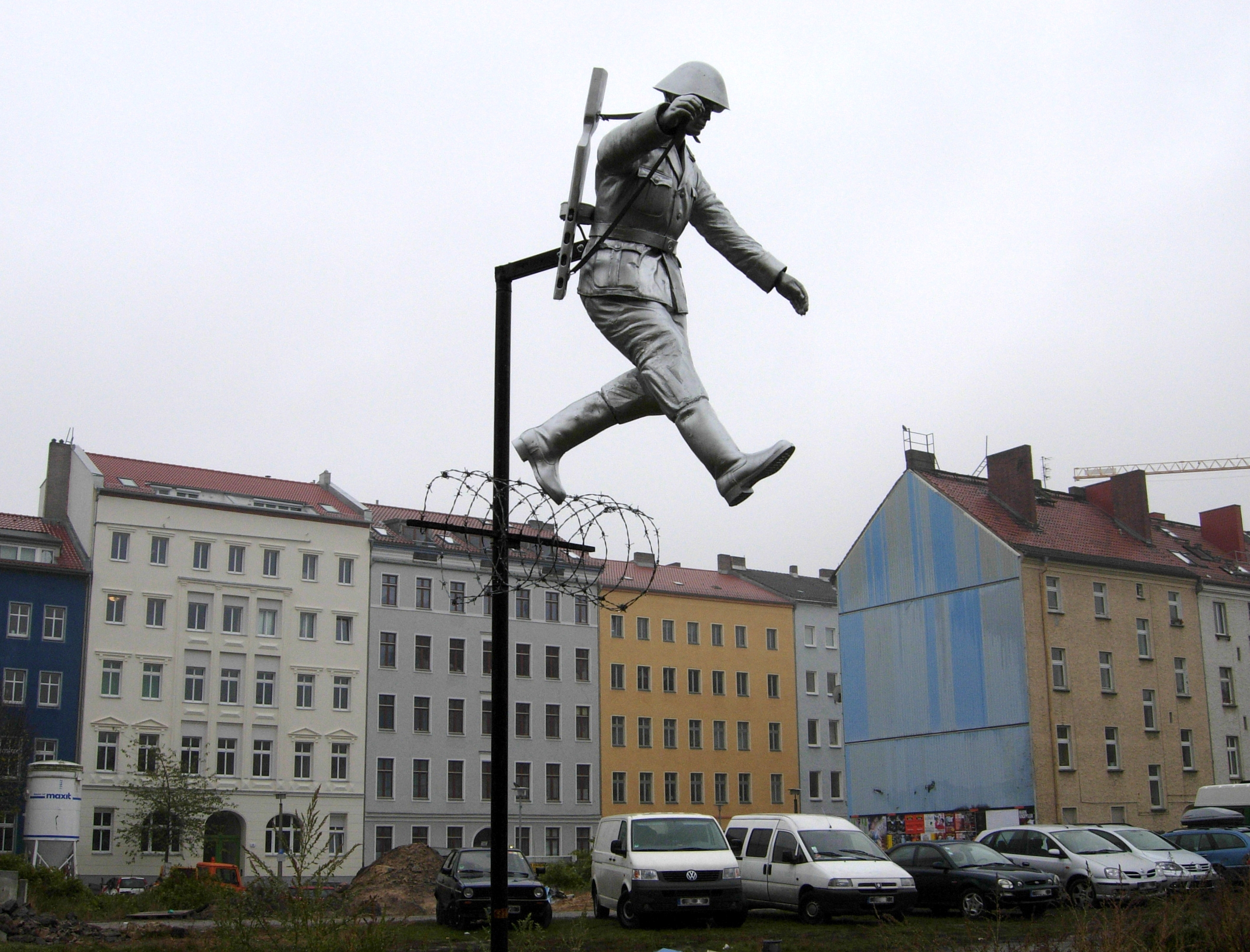
Sculpture called the Mauerspringer (Wall jumper) marking the spot at the corner of Ruppiner Straße and Bernauer Straße where the historic defection of East German soldier Conrad Schumann took place where he jumped over the barbed wire marking the border between East and West Berlin on 15 August 1961.

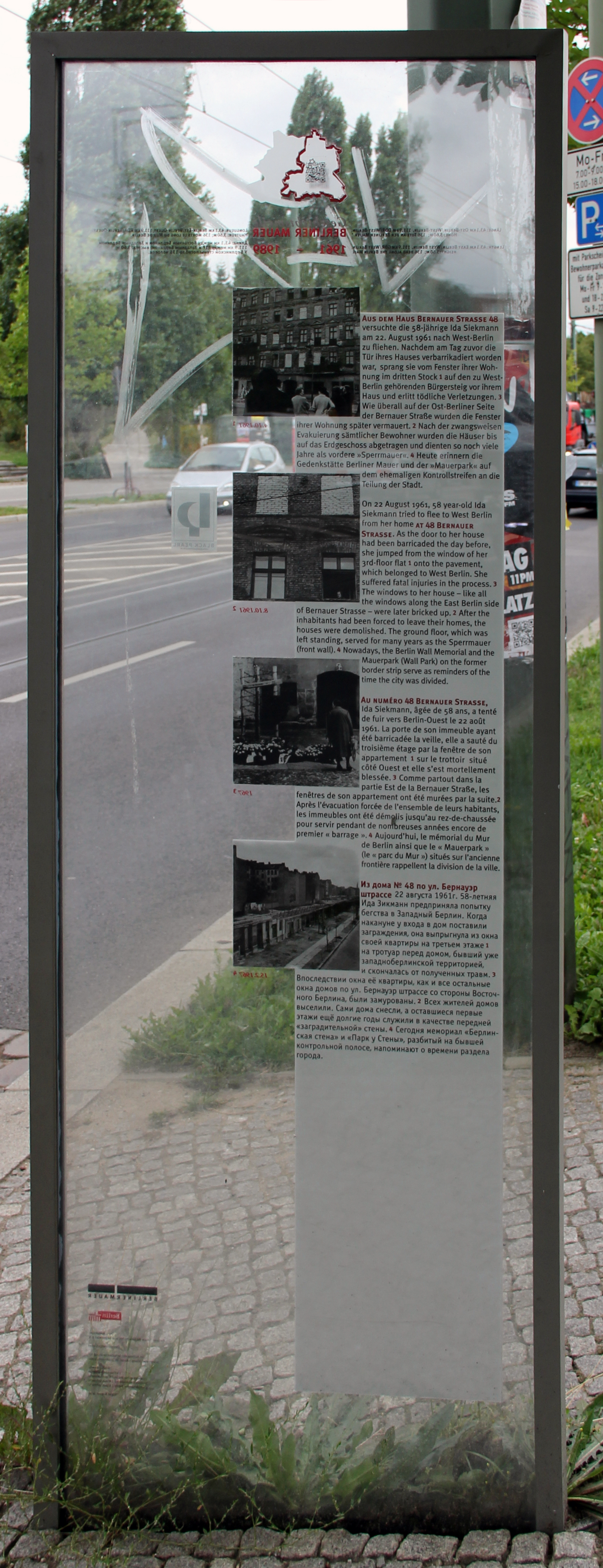
Memorial plaque marking Bernauer Straße 48, the house number where Ida Siekmann suffered fatal injuries after leaping from a window on the third floor while trying to flee East Berlin.

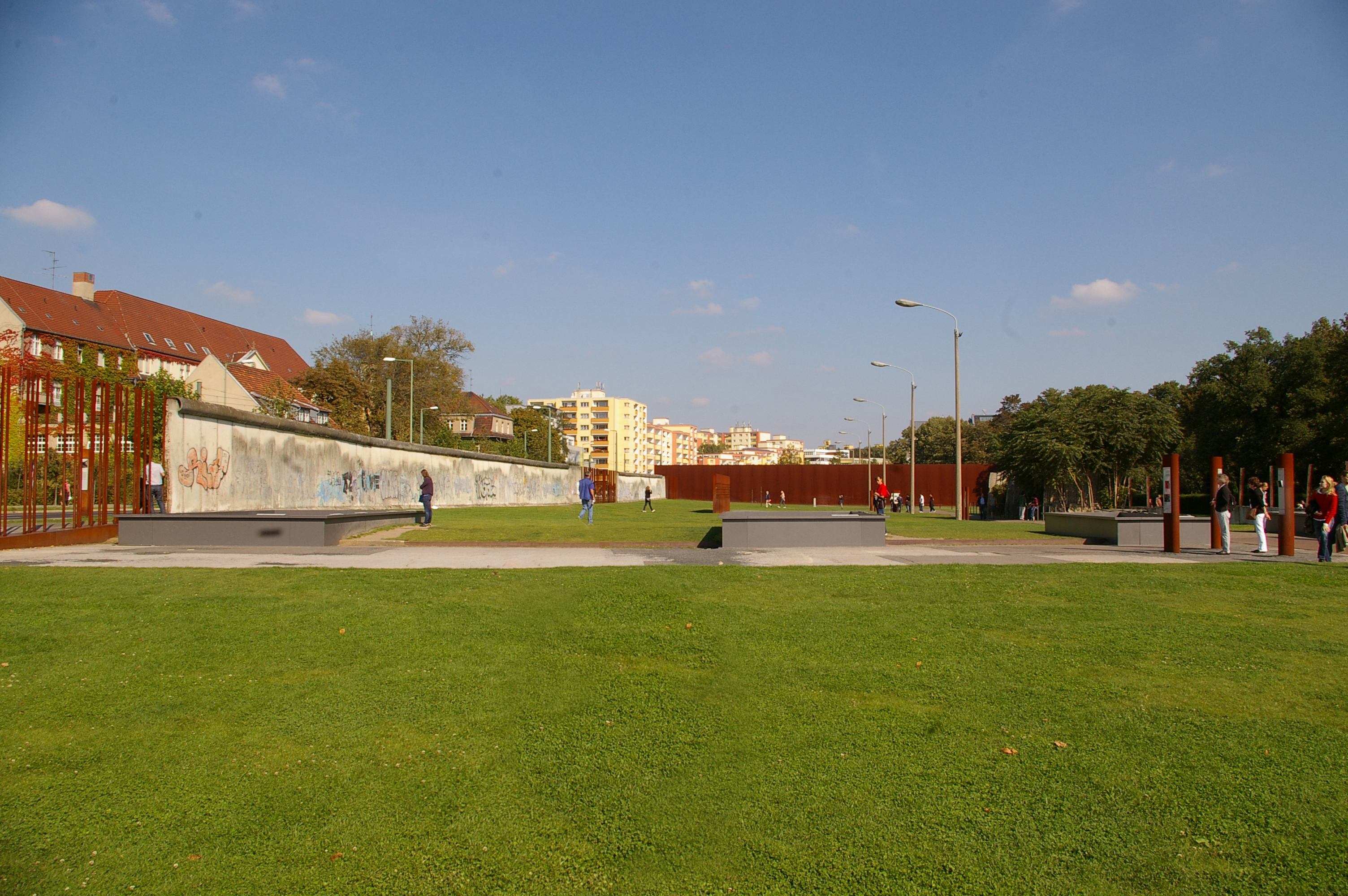
The Wall at the Gedenkstätte Berliner Mauer.

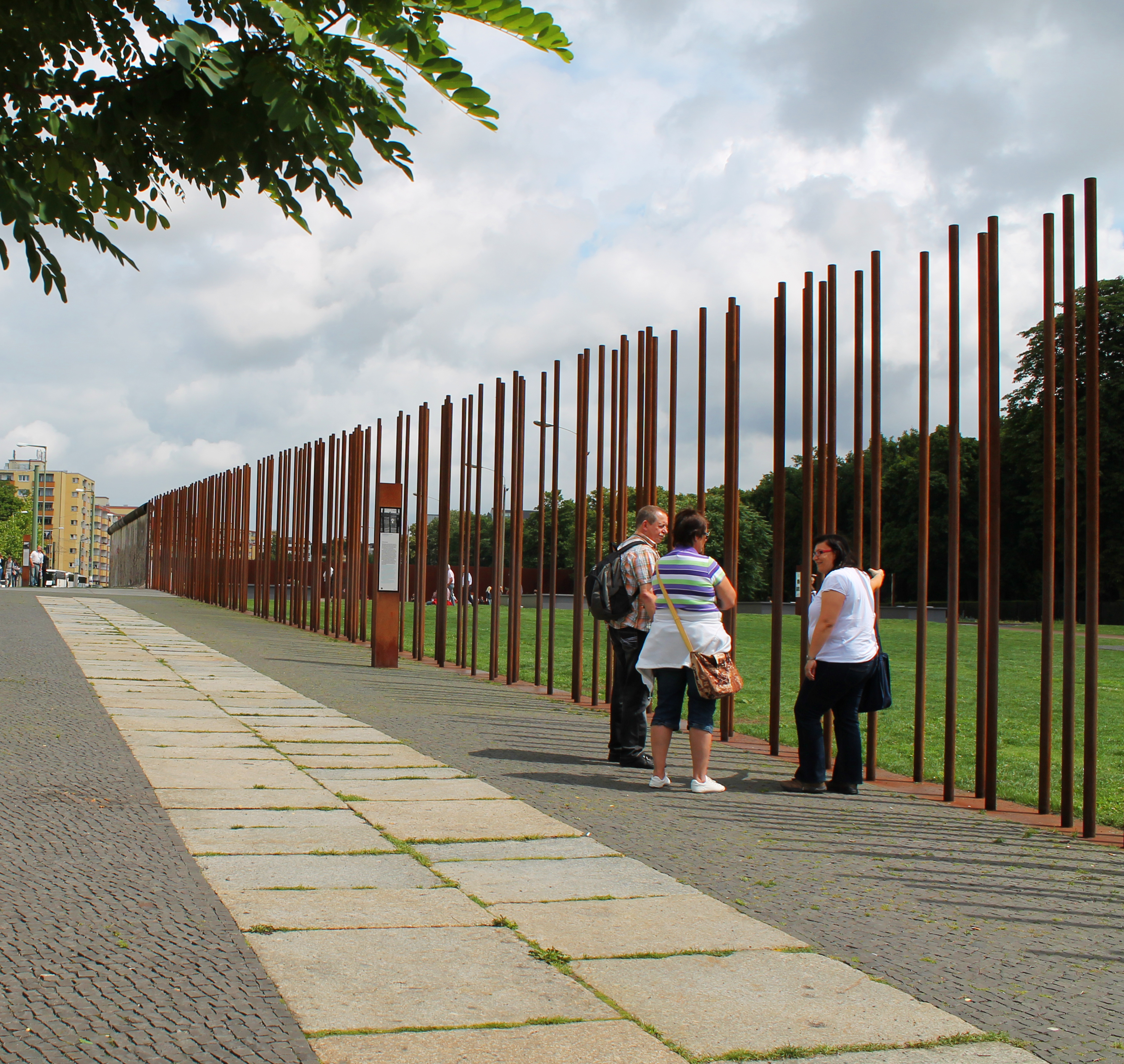
Poles mark where the Wall once stood along Bernauer Straße.

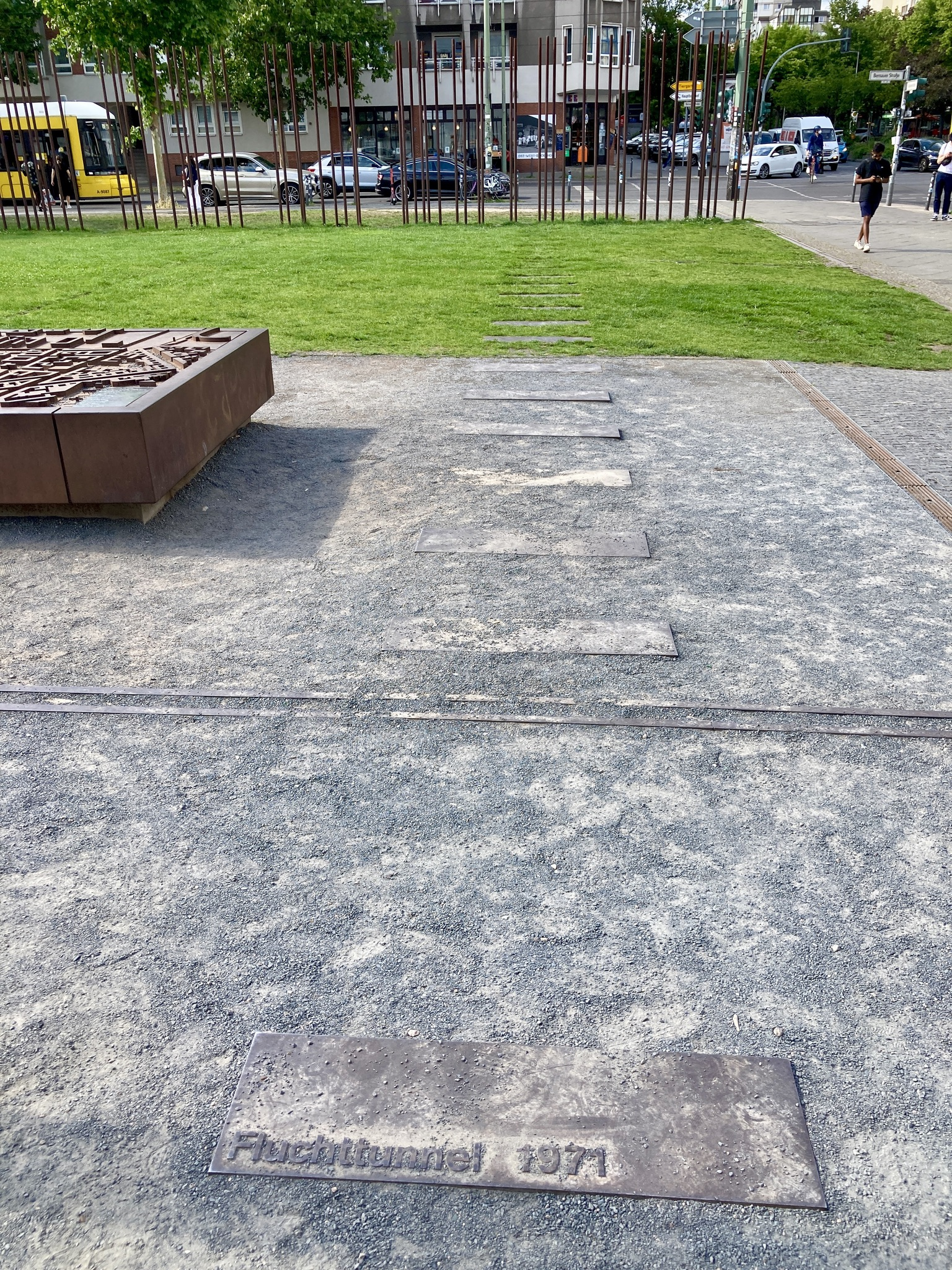
Fluchttunnel (Underground tunnel) memorial
