= Gedenkstätte Berliner Mauer =

Berlin Wall Memorial built in 1998

Coordinates: 52°32′6″N 13°23′23″E

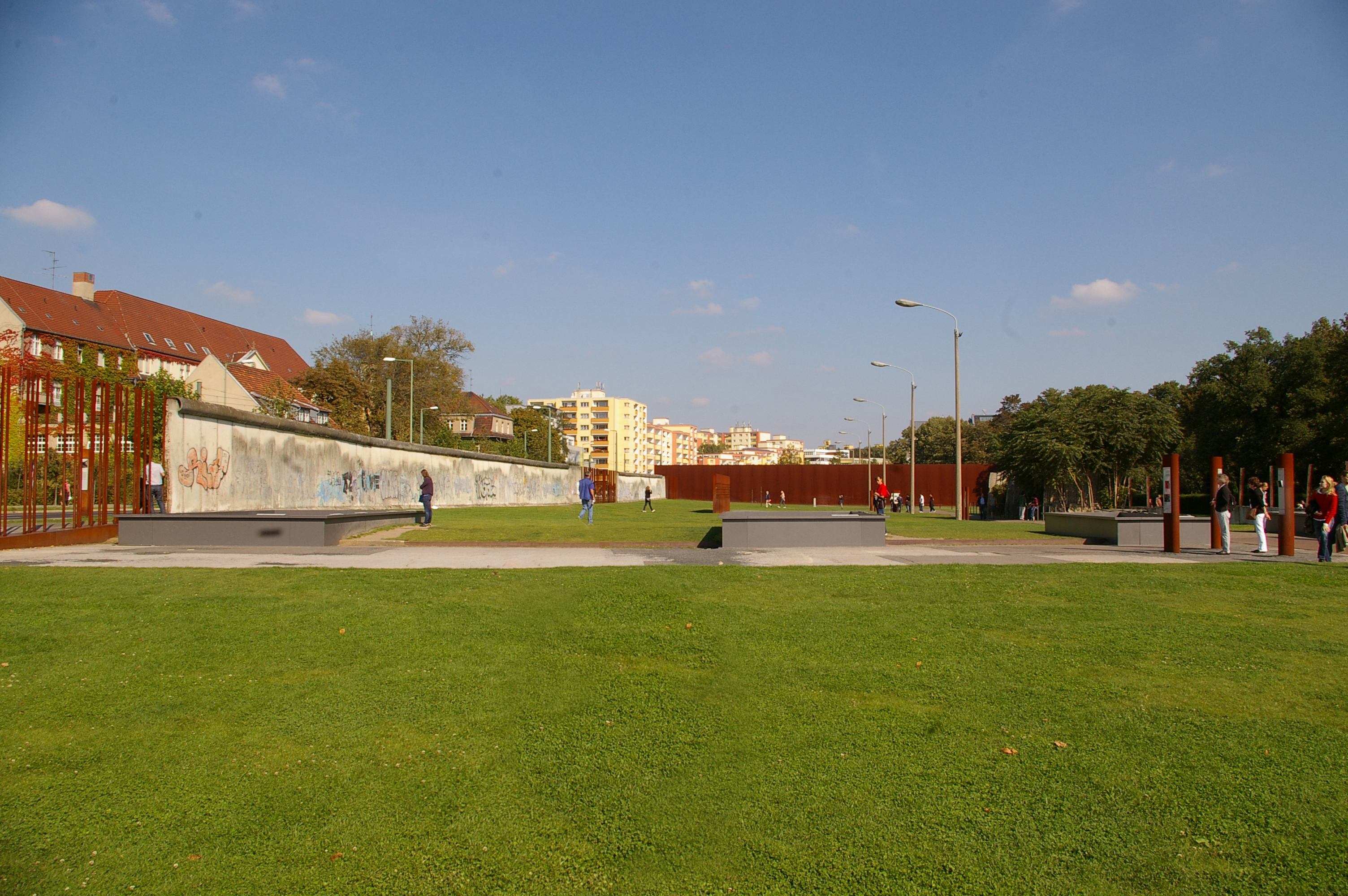
East side of the memorial

Gedenkstätte Berliner Mauer, Berlin

The Gedenkstätte Berliner Mauer (Berlin Wall Memorial) commemorates the division of Berlin by the Berlin Wall and the deaths that occurred there. The monument was created in 1998 by the Federal Republic of Germany and the Federal State of Berlin. It is located on Bernauer Straße at the corner of Ackerstraße and includes a Chapel of Reconciliation, the Berlin Wall Documentation Centre, a 60-metre (200 ft) section of the former border, a window of remembrance and a visitor center.

== History ==
The idea of a memorial was suggested by the Deutsches Historisches Museum (German Historical Museum) on behalf of the federal government of Berlin, and architects Kohlhoff & Kohlhoff were commissioned to design it. The cost of the competition and completion was 2.2 million Marks. The federal government took over the construction costs, while the state covers the maintenance costs. On 11 September 2008 the Berlin House of Representatives approved the opening of the memorial on the anniversary of the day that the Berlin Wall fell.

By 2013, an extension was to be completed. Original relics of the border were to be shown, with missing parts marked in steel on the ground. The memorial was to be divided into four areas:

- The wall and the Todesstreifen (death strip)
- Destruction of the city
- Building of the wall
- "Es geschah an der Mauer" ("It happened at the wall")

At the corner of Gartenstraße and Bernauer Straße, a visitor centre was opened. The outdoor area of the memorial west of Berlin Nordbahnhof was transformed into an Erinnerungslandschaft (memorial landscape). In 2006 there were over 220,000 visitors to the documentation centre, which is part of the memorial. Part of the memorial is located on Ackerstraße.

== Description ==
=== Original wall ===
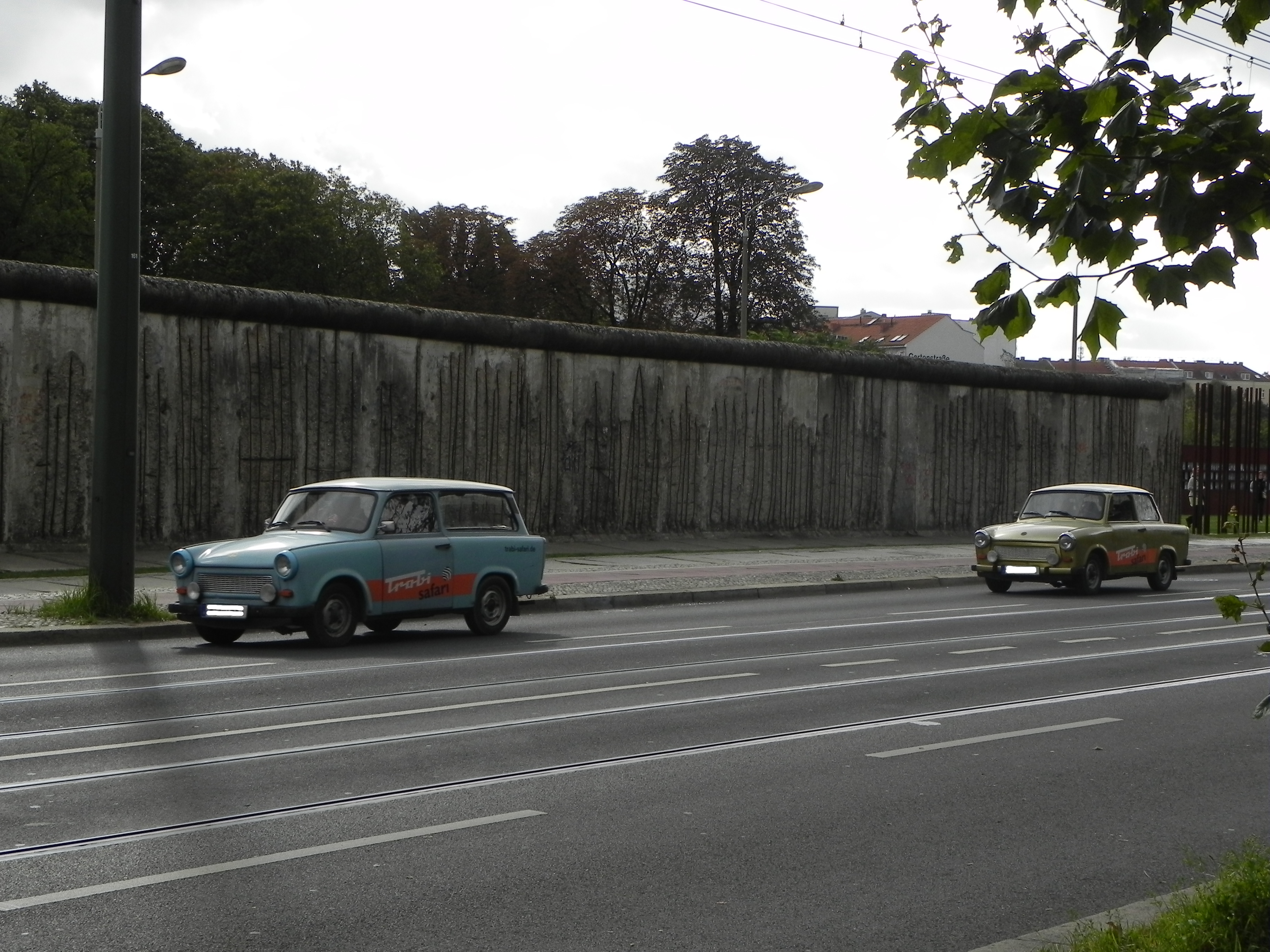
Part of the remaining section of the Berlin Wall

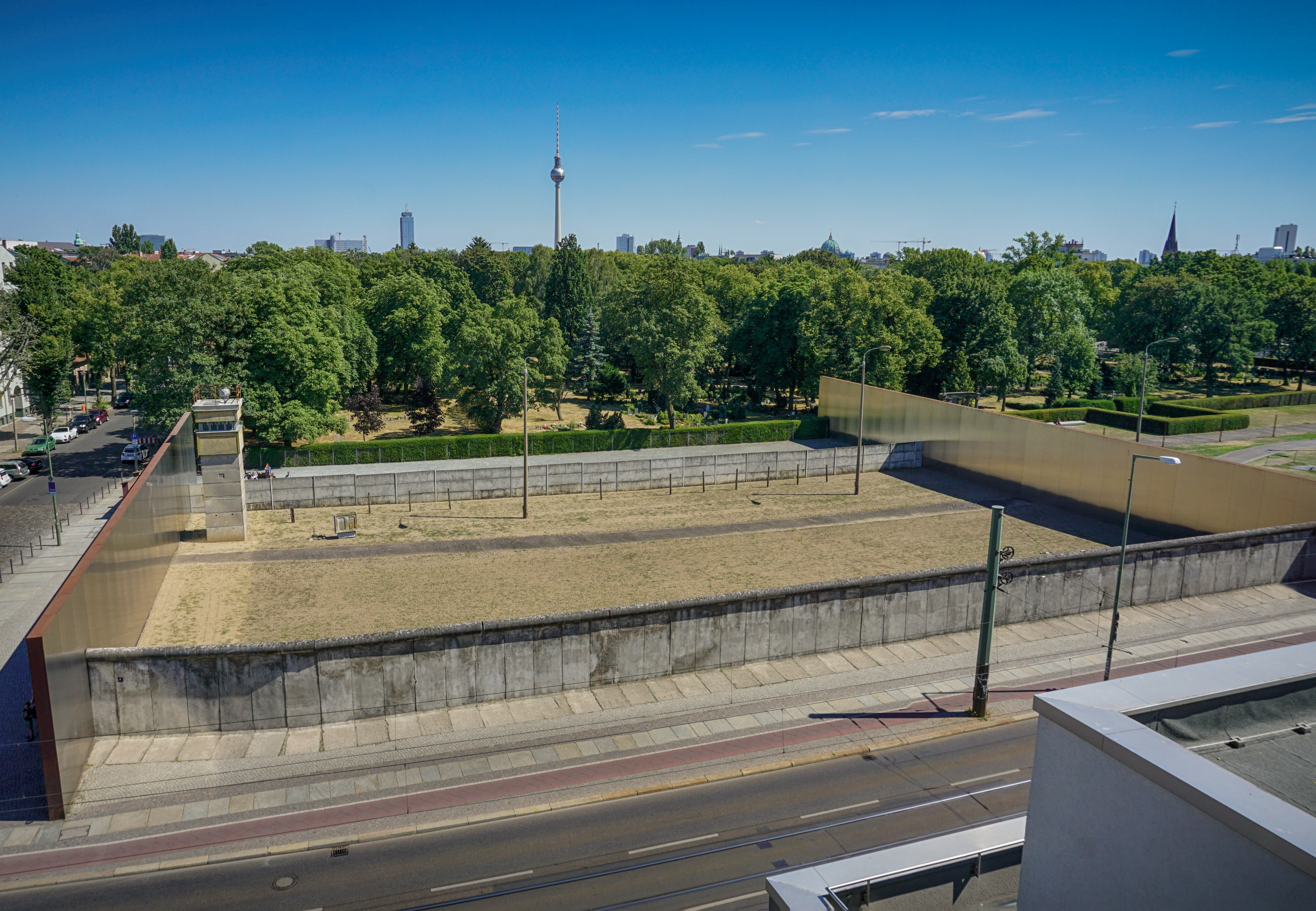
Memorial from Bernauer Straße

The memorial includes a 60-metre-long (200 ft) section of the wall as it was when the Wall fell. Seen from the west, a wall built from L-elements was lined by a sandy section, a lighted Kolonnenweg, a signal fence, and an inner wall. Finally a tower was built within the complex. The area is not accessible to visitors; both ends of the original wall are closed by stainless steel. The northern wall bears the inscription "In Erinnerung an die Teilung der Stadt vom 13. August 1961 bis zum 9. November 1989 und zum Gedenken an die Opfer kommunistischer Gewaltherrschaft" ("In memory of the city's division from 13 August 1961 to 9 November 1989 and of the victims of communist tyranny").

=== Documentation centre ===
The documentation centre is located on the other side of Bernauer Straße. It contains seminar rooms and exhibitions. The building includes a five-story observation tower.

=== Chapel of Reconciliation ===
The Chapel of Reconciliation was designed by architects Rudolf Reitermann and Peter Sassenroth as a church and is oval in shape with a façade of wooden rods. The chapel includes a prayer room and materials from the former Versöhnungskirche (reconciliation church), which stood on the site until it was destroyed in 1985 because it was inside the border strip.
