= Gesundbrunnen (Berlin) =

- Quarter of Berlin
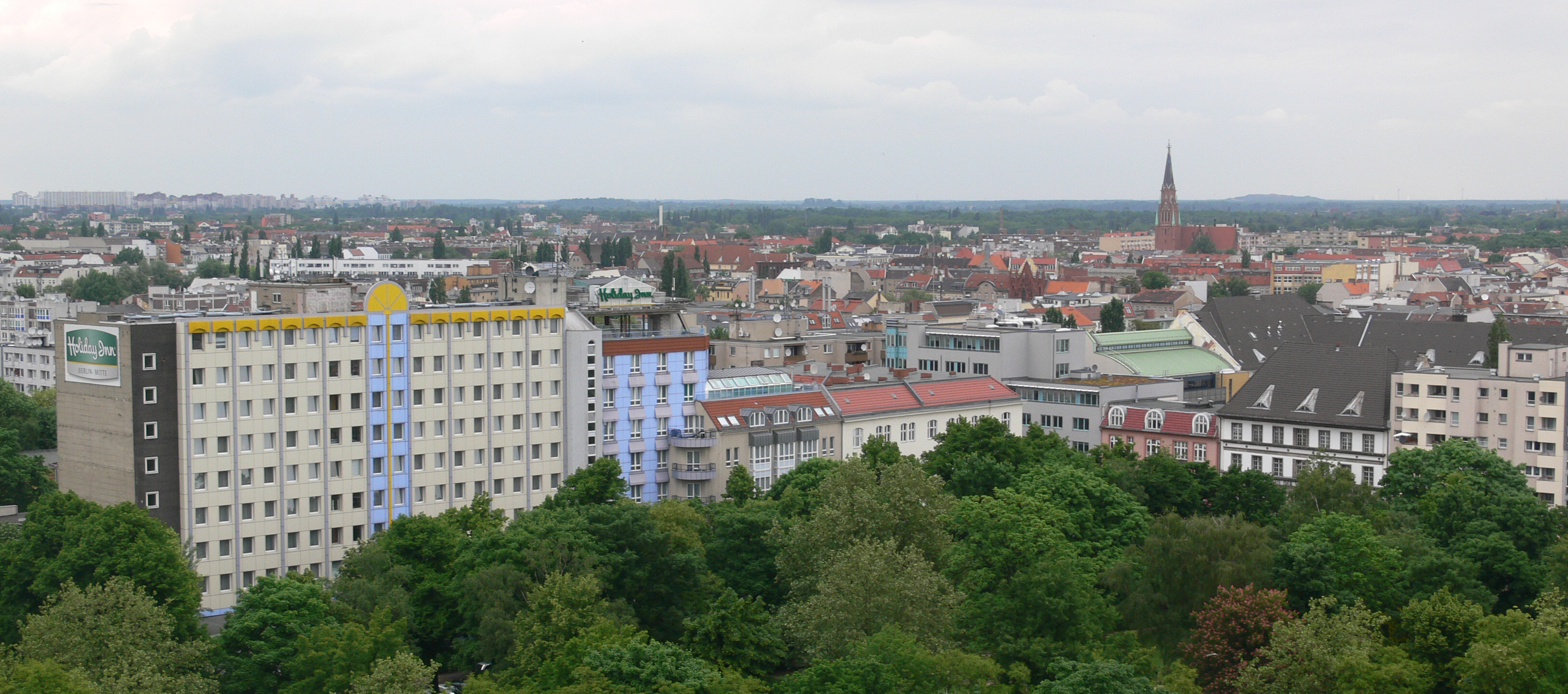
- Panorama from the Humboldthain

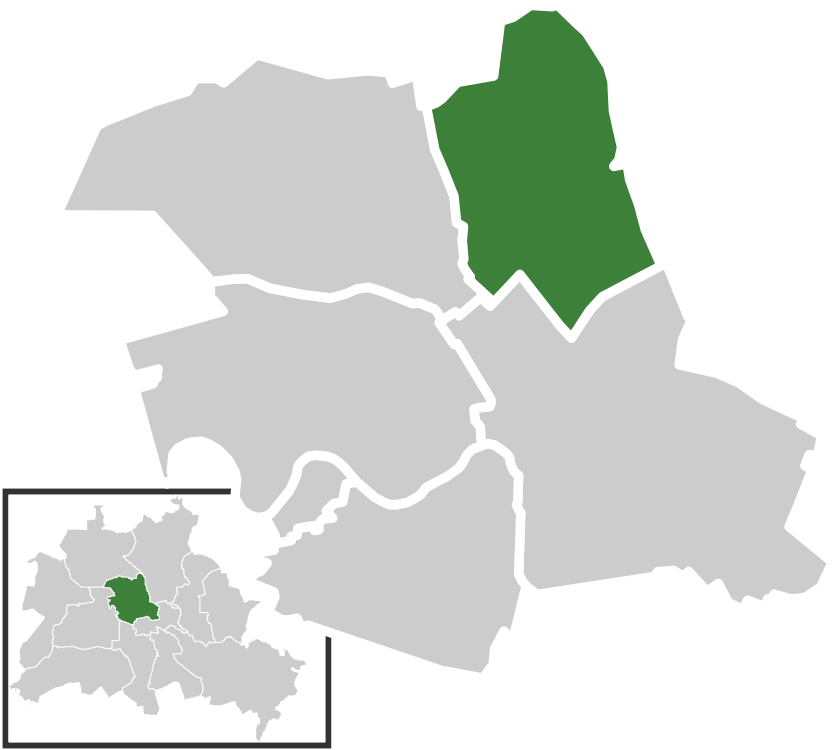
- Location of Gesundbrunnen in Mitte district and Berlin
- Interactive map of Gesundbrunnen
- Location within Germany Location within Berlin
- Coordinates: 52°32′55″N 13°23′25″E
- Country: Germany
- State: Berlin
- City: Berlin
- Borough: Mitte
- Founded: 1251

Area
  - Total: 6.13 km^{2} (2.37 sq mi)
- Elevation: 52 m (171 ft)

Population (2024-12-31)
  - Total: 95,132
  - Density: 15,500/km^{2} (40,200/sq mi)
- Time zone: UTC+01:00 (CET)
  - Summer (DST): UTC+02:00 (CEST)
- Postal codes: 13347, 13355, 13357, 13359, 13409
- Vehicle registration: B

Gesundbrunnen (German: [ɡəˈzʊntˌbʁʊnən], literally "health springs"; colloquially Plumpe, "pump") is a locality (Ortsteil) of Berlin in the borough (Bezirk) of Mitte. It was created as a separate entity during the 2001 administrative reform, formerly the eastern half of the former Wedding district (merged into Mitte) and locality. Gesundbrunnen has the highest percentage of non-German residents of any Berlin locality, at 35.1% as of the end of 2008.

== Geography ==
The locality is situated in Berlin's inner city, at the north-eastern rim of the central Mitte borough. Bernauer Straße separates it from the locality of Mitte in the south and Reinickendorfer Straße from Wedding in the west. In the north Gesundbrunnen borders with Reinickendorf (in the Reinickendorf borough) while in the east the Mauerpark and the Nordbahn railway line forms the border with Prenzlauer Berg and Pankow, both localities of the Pankow borough. Gesundbrunnen was laid out in what came to be known as the Wilhelmine Ring, an area whose street network was laid out in the Hobrecht-Plan.

== History ==
The locality adopted its name from a mineral spring first documented by chemist Andreas Sigismund Marggraf about 1748, later site of the Luisenbad spa, named after Queen Louise of Prussia. The area became a popular destination for day-trippers and, after its incorporation into the city of Berlin in 1861, a densely settled working-class district.

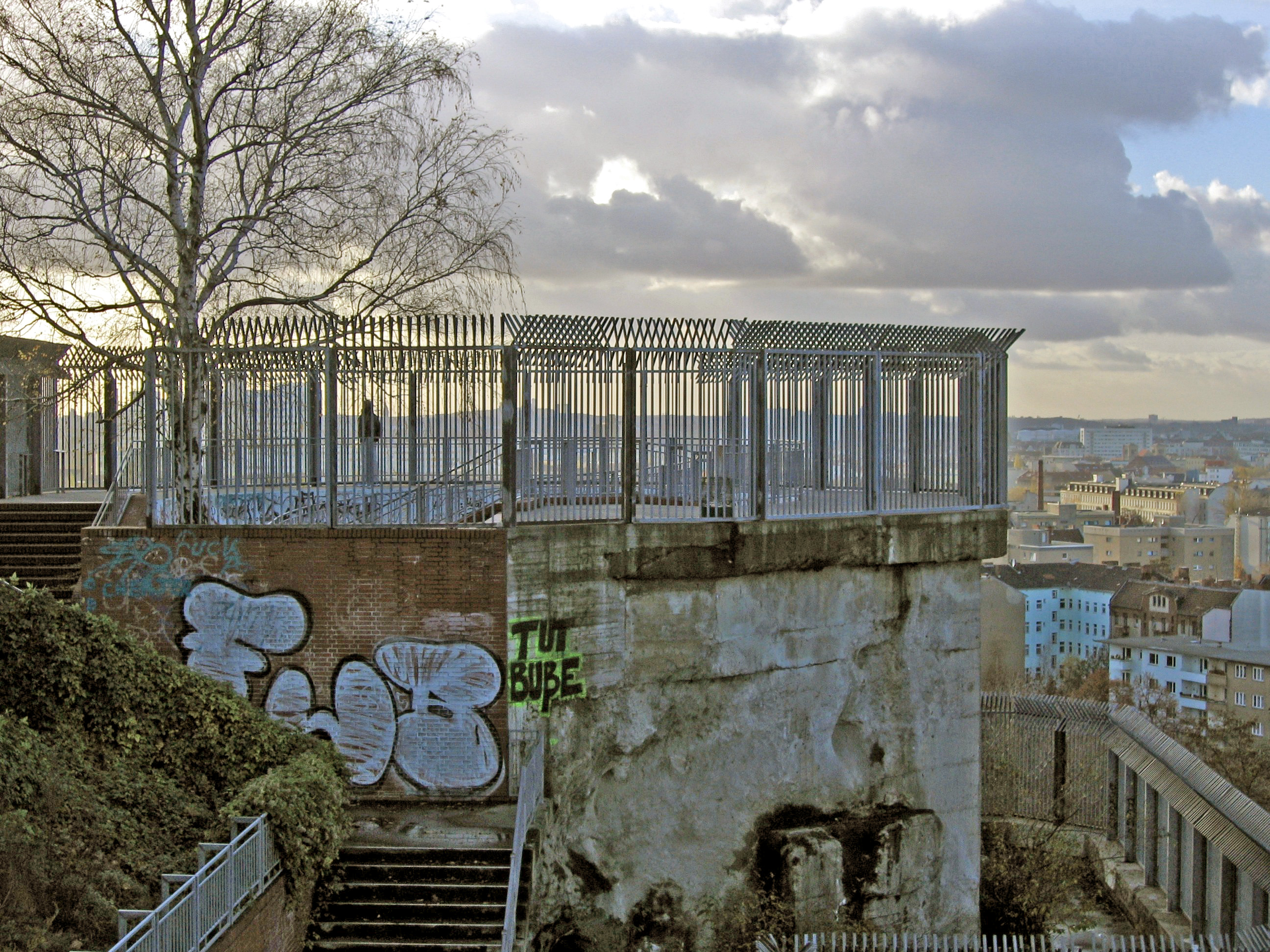
Humboldthain flak tower

In the 19th century, the spa was dominantly visited by the Berlin working class. The Humboldthain urban park, finished in 1876, from 1942 was the site of two large flak towers. The northern tower, due to its location near the Ringbahn tracks, was not blown up after World War II. Partly interred by rubble it today serves as a viewpoint and climbing wall with tours through the interior available.

From 1905 the sports field near the Berlin-Gesundbrunnen station, later Stadion am Gesundbrunnen, was the home ground of the Hertha BSC Berlin football club. From 1949 Gesundbrunnen as part of district Wedding belonged to the French sector of West Berlin, while the neighbouring localities of Mitte, Pankow and Prenzlauer Berg were parts of East Berlin. The border between the sectors and, from 1961 to 1989, the Berlin Wall ran along the Nordbahn railway and the divided Bernauer Straße. This street became famous for tunnels dug under it as well as for daring escape jumps from windows of the apartment blocks in the eastern part of the city, down to the street which itself belonged to the French sector. On the evening of 9 November 1989 the border crossing at Bornholmer Straße station was the first to open, allowing East Berliners to pass freely toward the west.

== Transportation ==
The area is one of the few localities of the former western sector served by tramways (lines M10, M13 and 50). It is also served by many S-Bahn lines (S1, S2, S25, S4, S8 and S85) and U-Bahn (U8 and U9). Its main station is the eponymous one, Gesundbrunnen, which was upgraded in 2006 for long distance trains. Other stations are Bornholmer Straße, Humboldthain, Nordbahnhof (the former Stettiner Bahnhof), Wollankstraße, Nauener Platz, Osloer Straße, Pankstraße and Voltastraße.

== Notable people ==
- Harald Juhnke (1929–2005), actor
- Theodor Plievier (1892–1955), novelist

== Photo gallery ==
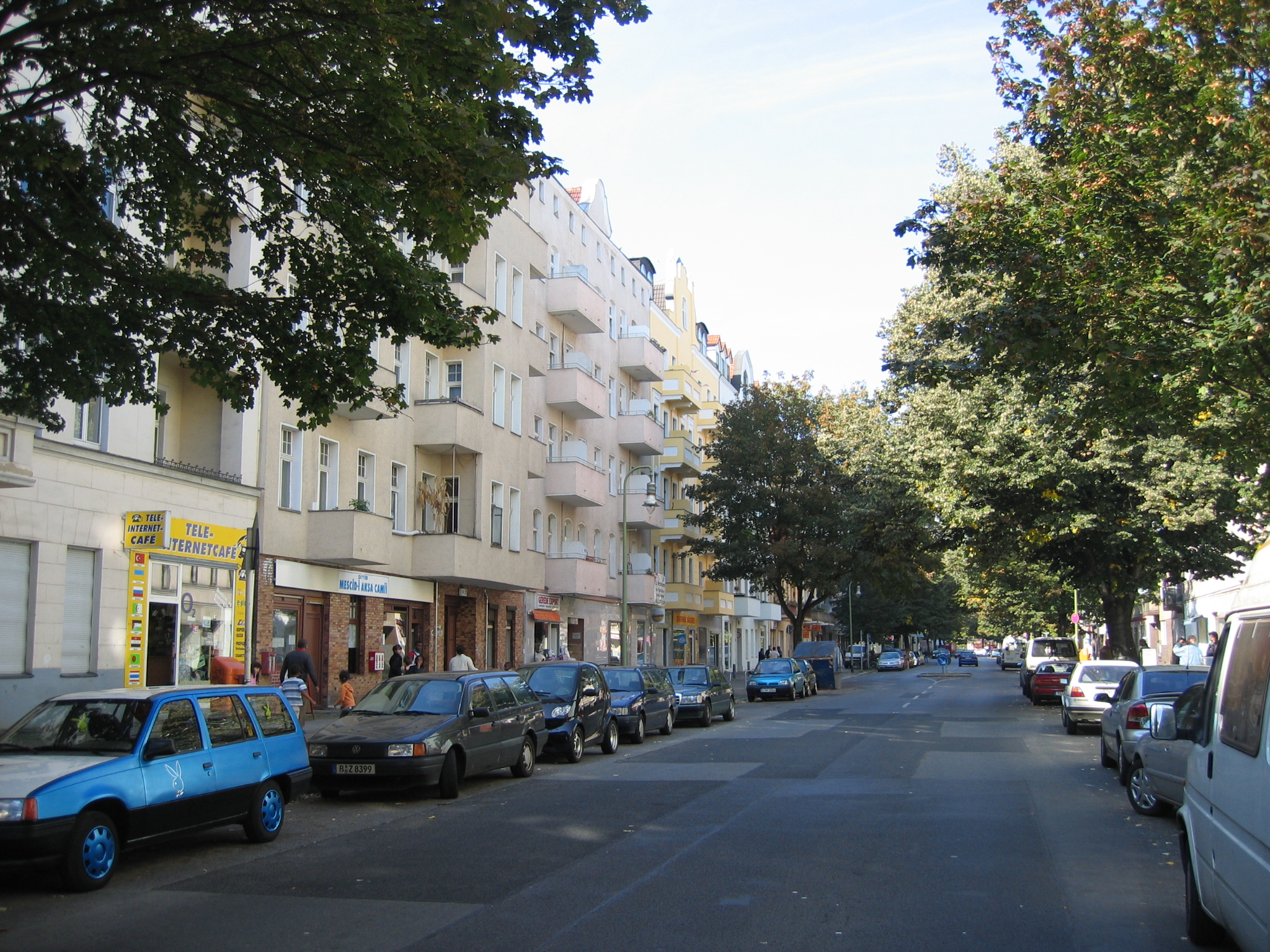
Soldinerstraße

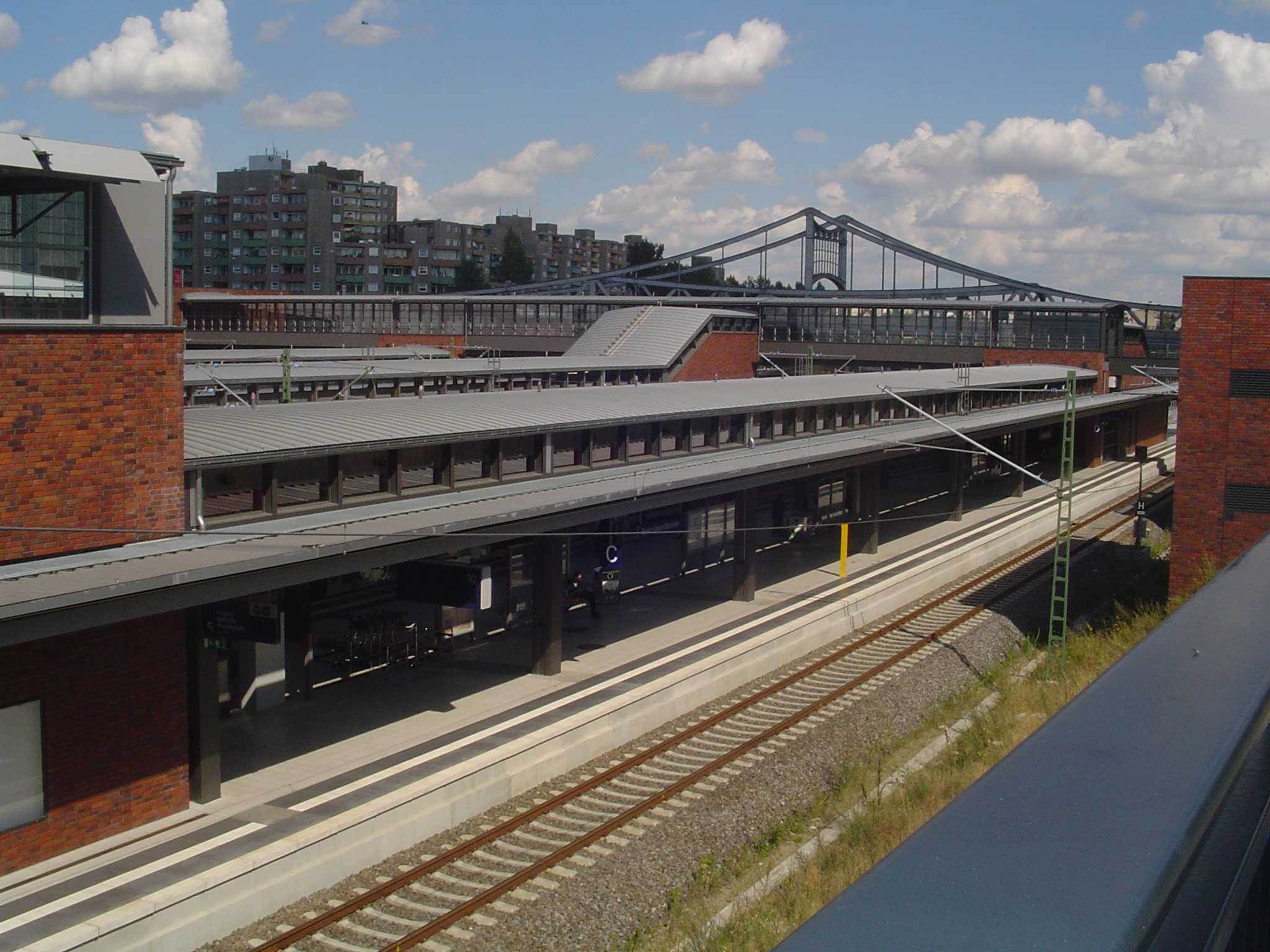
Gesundbrunnen railway station

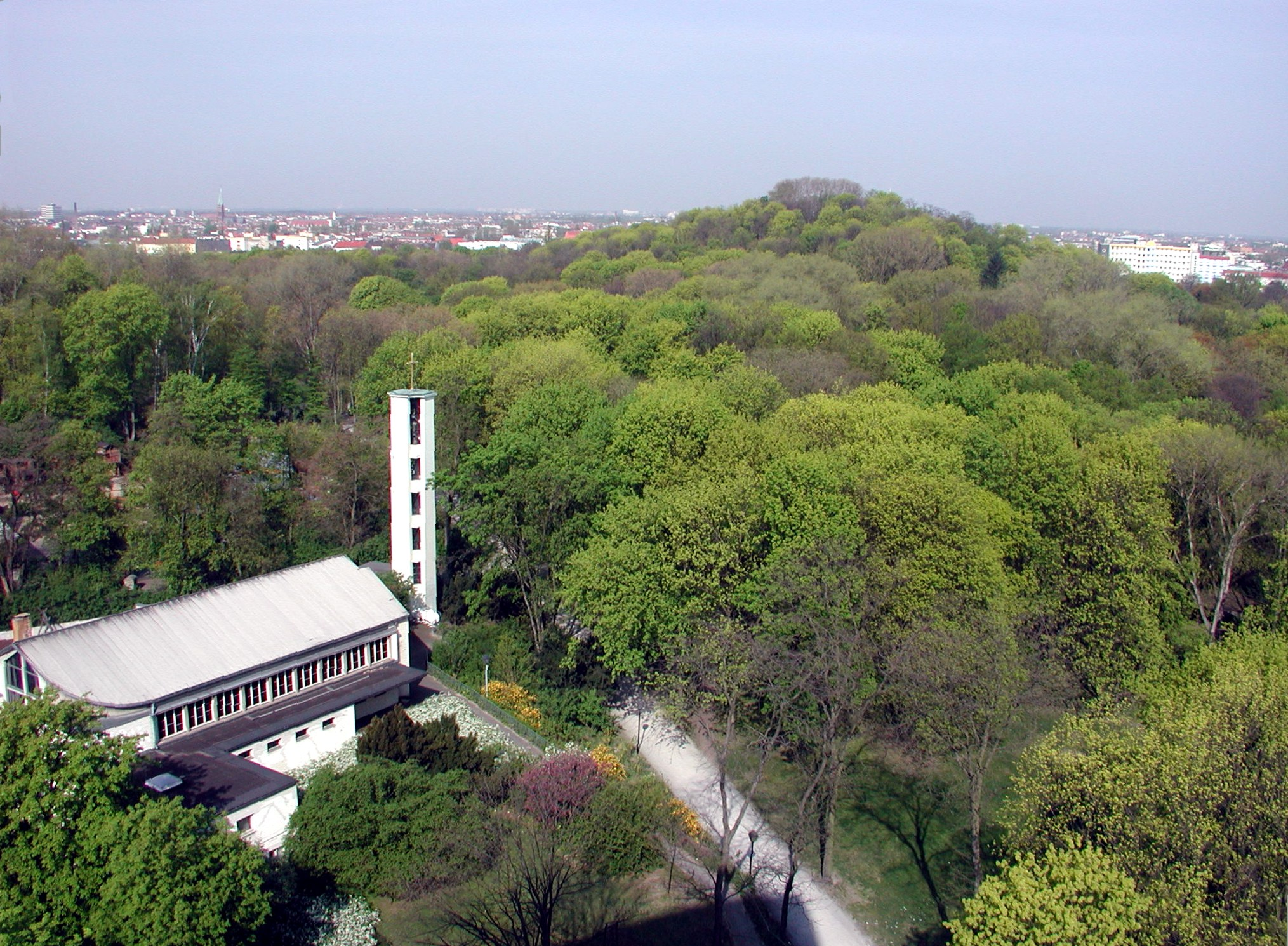
The hill of Humboldthöhe in the park of Humboldthain

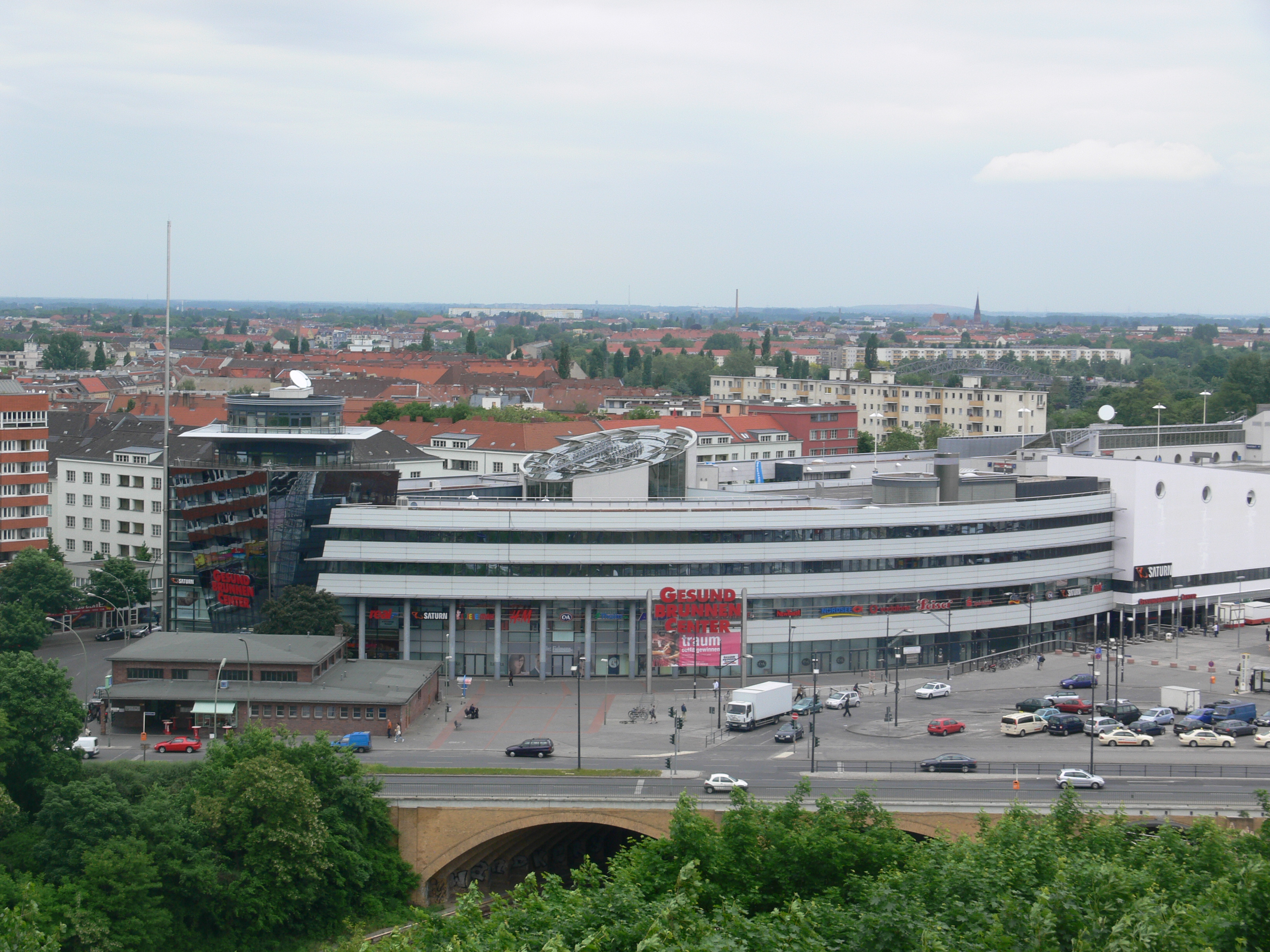
Gesundbrunnen-Center

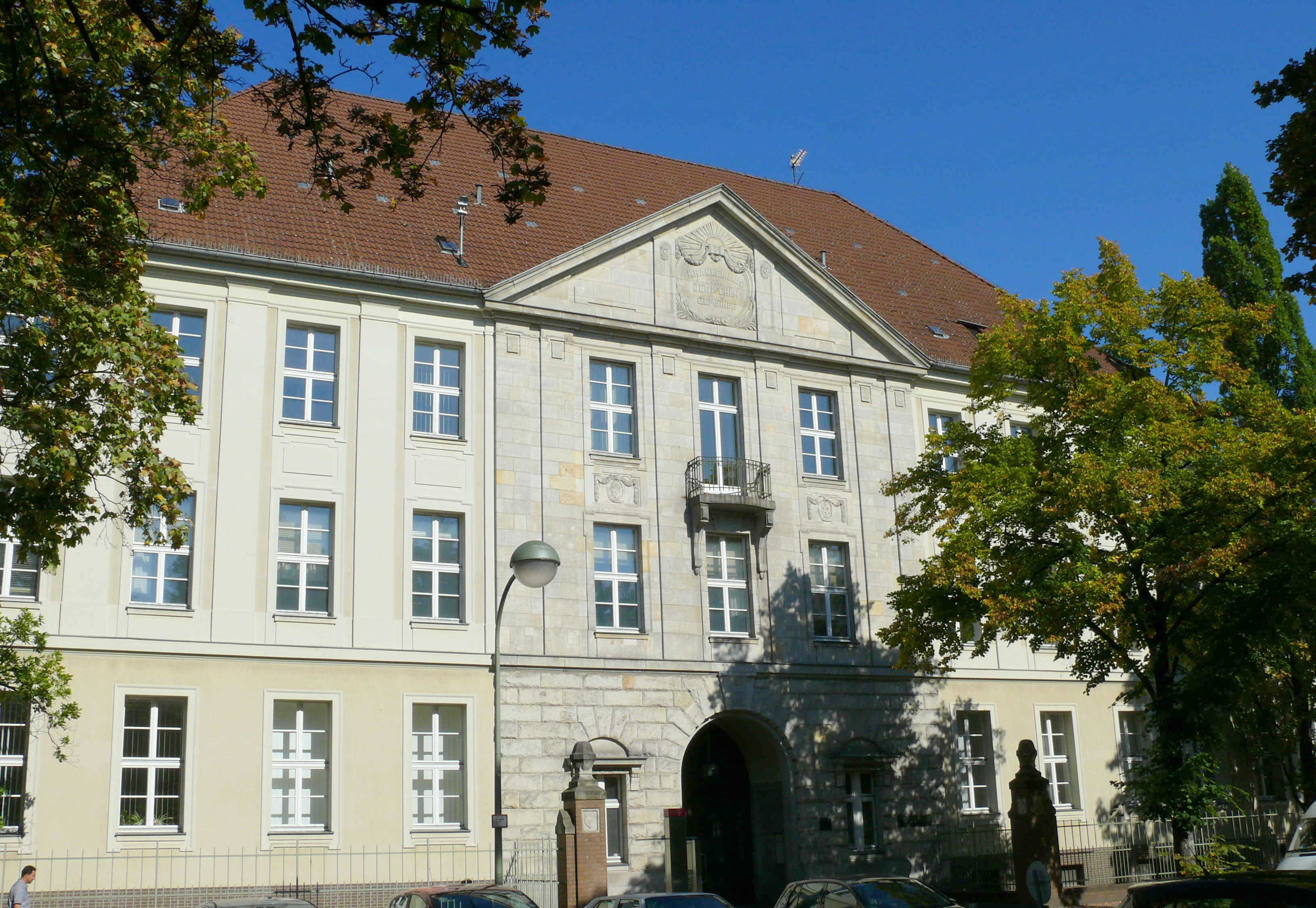
Jewish Hospital

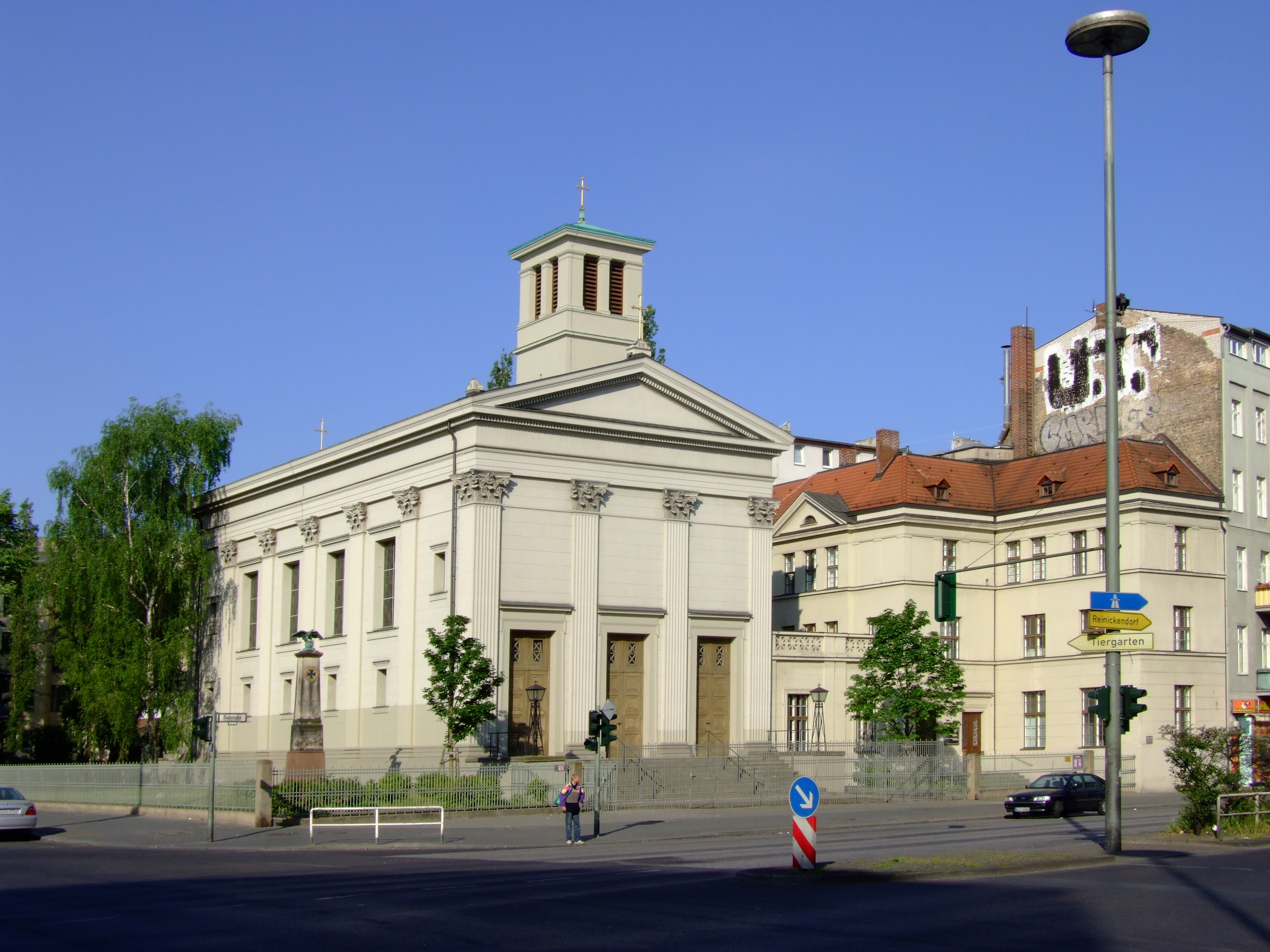
St.-Pauls Church

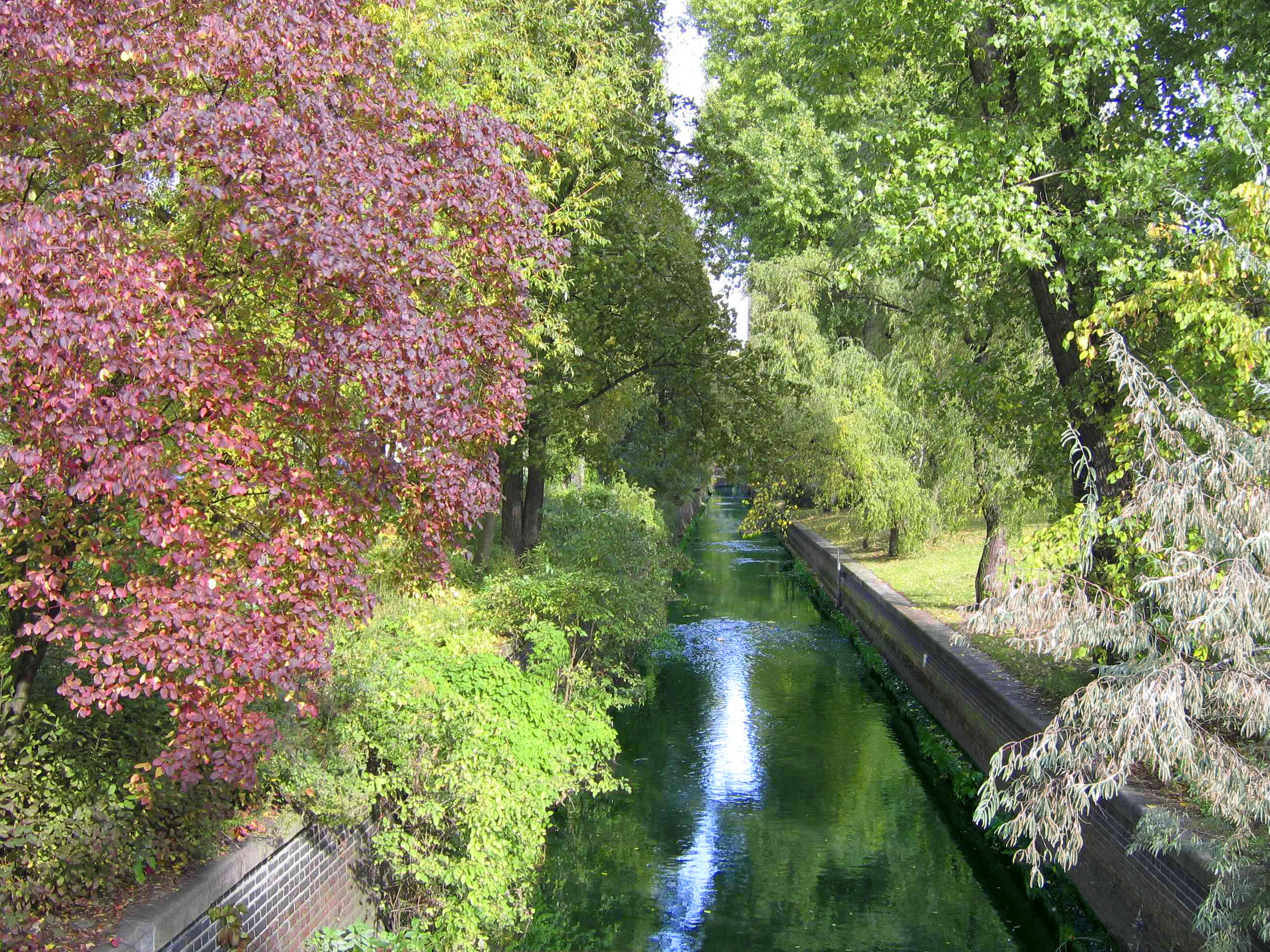
Panke River in Gesundbrunnen

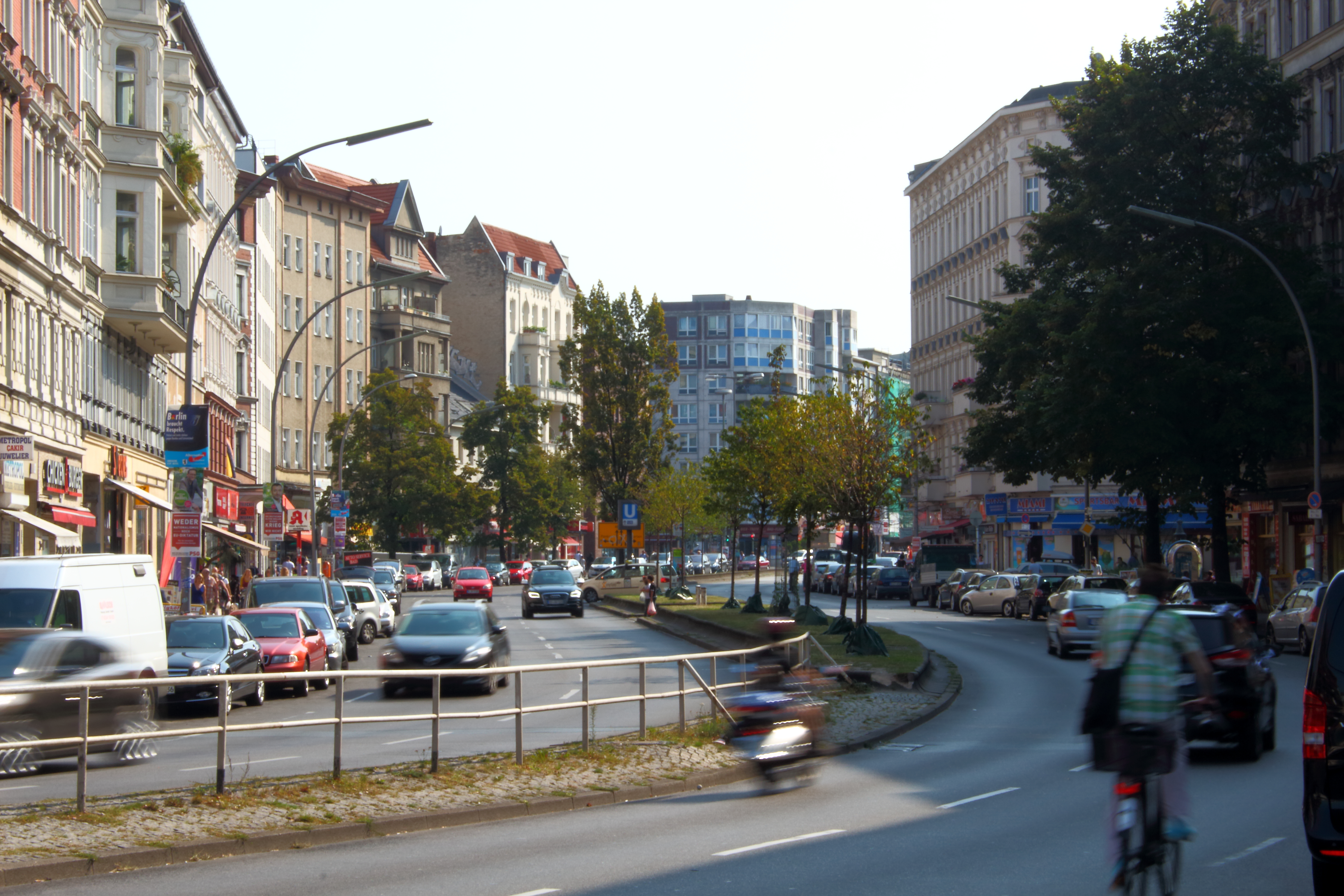
Badstraße
