= Bernauer Straße station =

Station of the Berlin U-Bahn

Coordinates: 52°32′15″N 13°23′48″E

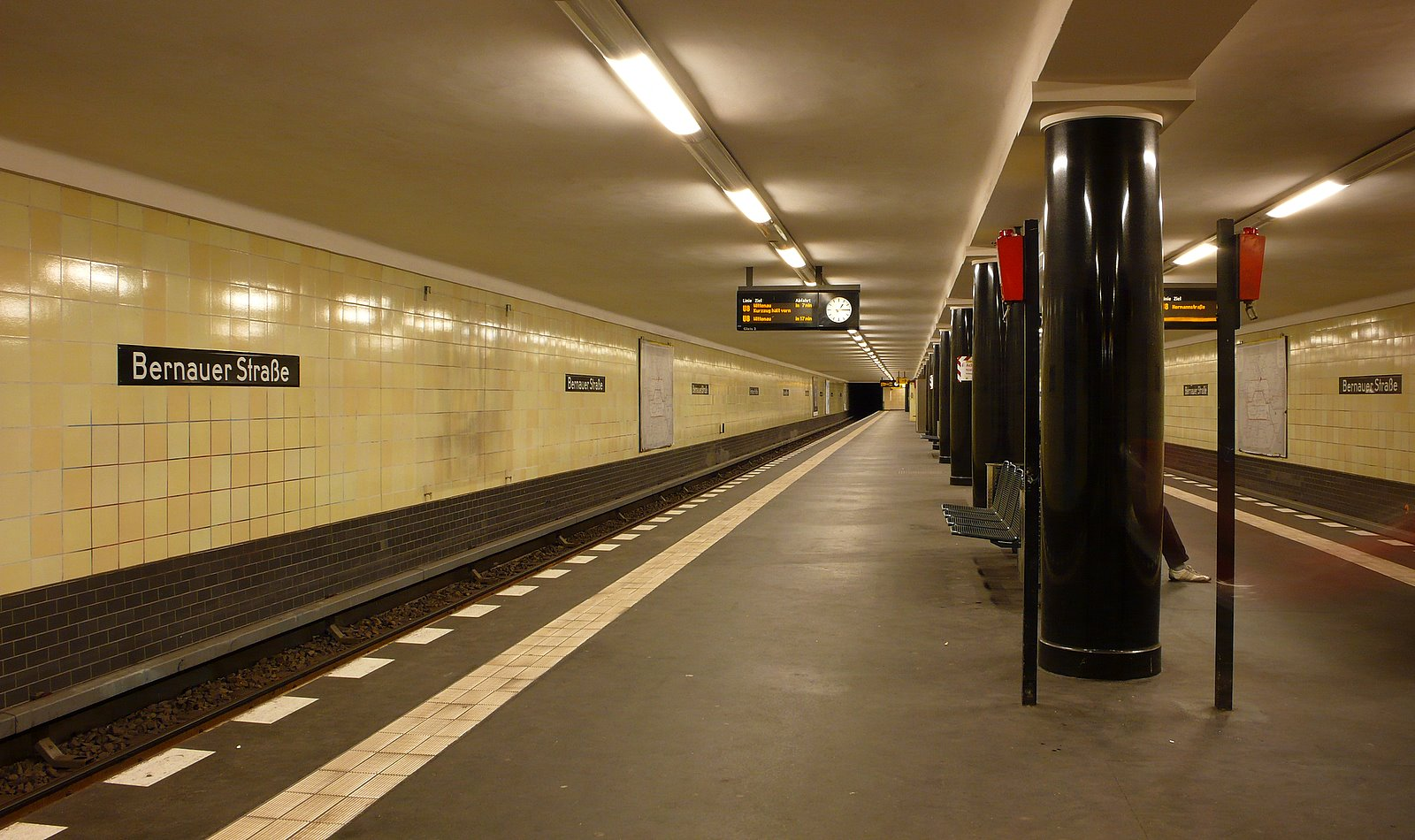
Station Bernauer Straße

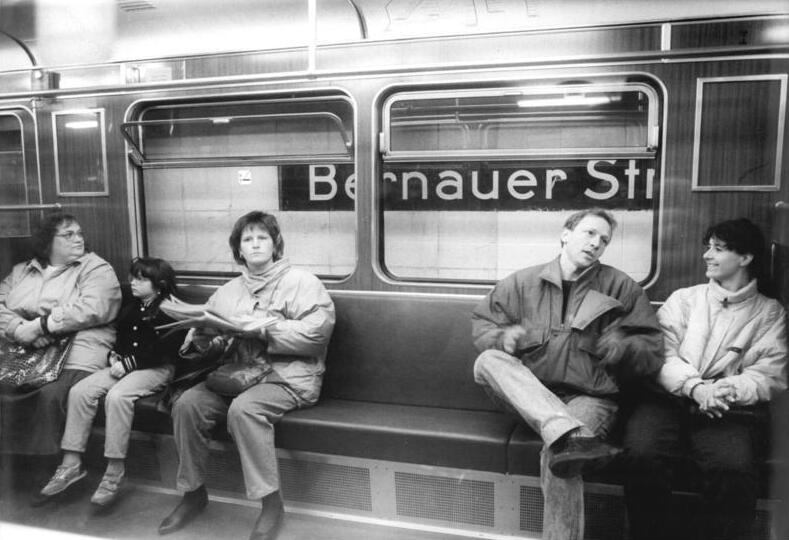
Inside a train at Bernauer Straße U-Bahn station

Bernauer Straße is a Berlin U-Bahn station located on the U8.

== History ==
Built by the subway architect A. Grenander in 1930, this station was a station of the GN Bahn (Gesundbrunnen-Neukölln) of line D. On 8 February 1944, it was destroyed due to ceiling openings.

In April 1945 it was closed due to World War II, and reopened again in May 1945.

After the Second World War, the subway station was below the border between the Soviet and French sectors. As a result, the building of the Wall on 13 August 1961 closed the station, making it, like five other stations along the line, a "Geisterbahnhof (Ghost Station)" where trains passed through. An opening came only with the political turnaround, at which on 12 April 1990, initially the western part was made accessible again. The entrance gate was removed on 19 March 1990 on the decision to open the station. The bullet-riddled holes in the U-Bahn station were later removed. The eastern exit had to be renovated and was reopened on 1 July 1990.

== Notes ==
Preceding station	Berlin U-Bahn	Following station
Voltastraße towards Wittenau	U8	Rosenthaler Platz towards Hermannstraße
