= Kulturbrauerei =

Coordinates: 52°32′20″N 13°24′49″E

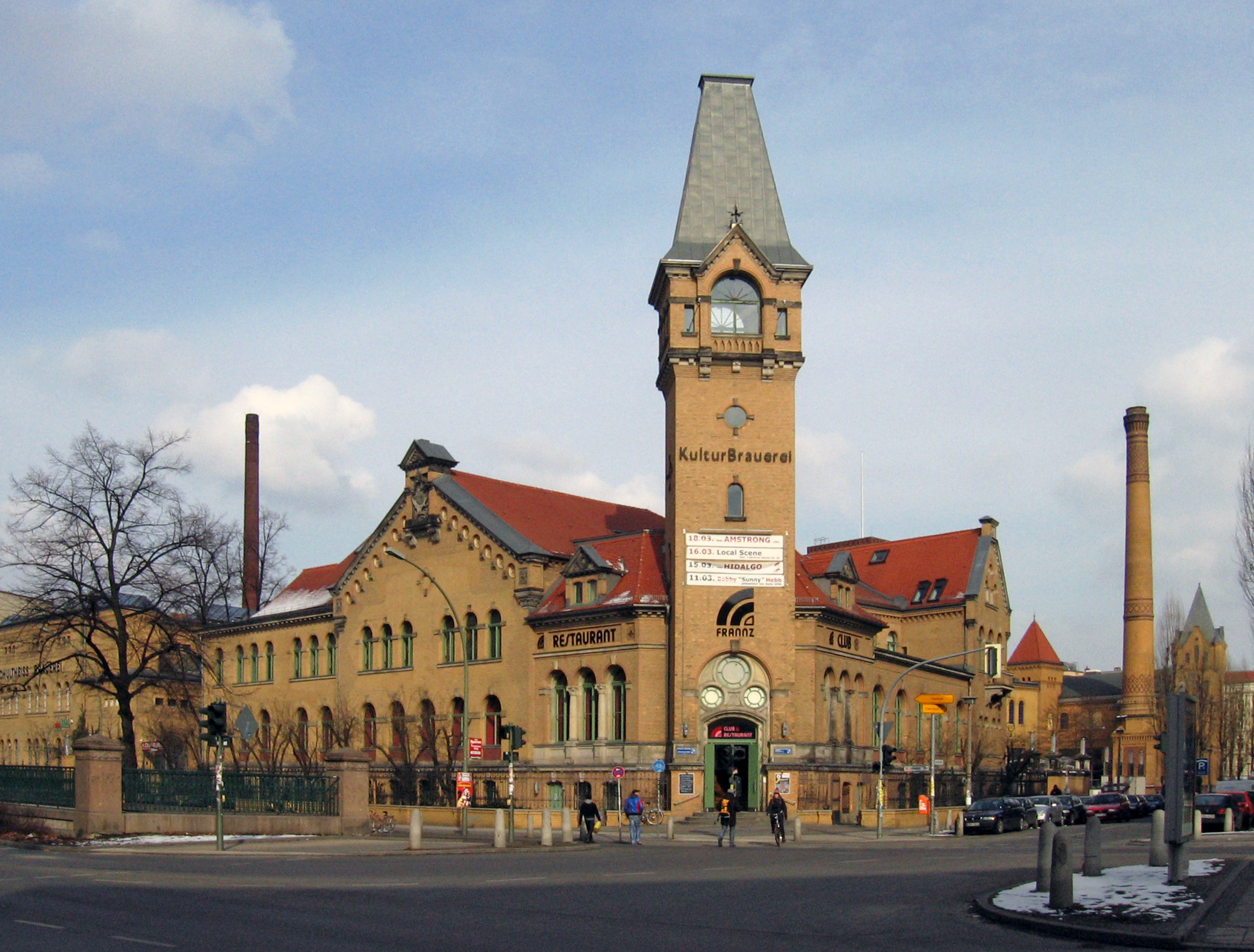
The Kulturbrauerei viewed from the junction of Schönhauser Allee and Sredzkistraße

Kulturbrauerei, Berlin

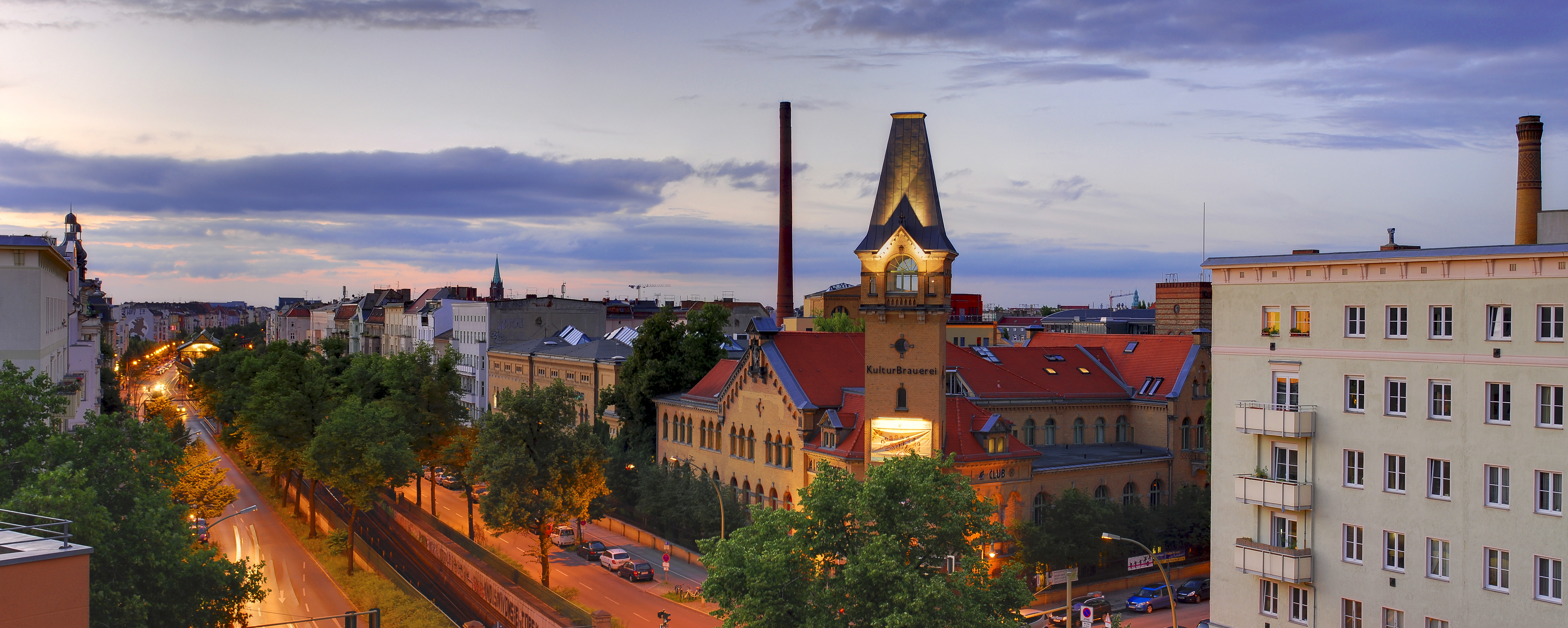
The Kulturbrauerei with Schönhauser Allee

The Berlin Kulturbrauerei (literally "Culture Brewery") is a 25,000-square-metre (270,000 sq ft) building complex in Berlin, Germany. Originally built and operated as a brewery, its courtyards and unique architecture have been protected as a monument since 1974. It is one of the few well-preserved examples of industrial architecture in Berlin dating from the end of the 19th century.

It operates commercially as a cultural center in the Kollwitz neighborhood of the Prenzlauer Berg district (Borough of Pankow), with support from the Treuhandliegenschaftsgesellschaft (TLG). It provides cinemas, theatres, clubs and function rooms. It is situated close to the Eberswalder Straße U-Bahn station.

== History ==
In 1842, a pharmacist began using the location as a small beer bar. Over time and varying ownership, the site grew into a full-fledged brewery, with the first proper brewhouse erected in 1871, the Schultheiss brewery.

In 1887, the architect Franz Heinrich Schwechten redesigned and expanded the site using a medieval castle as inspiration.

By 1891, it was acknowledged to be the largest brewery in Berlin; following a merger with Berliner-Kindl in 1921, it became the largest lager brewery in the world.

In 1937, the company operating the brewery was declared to be a "National Socialist model company" and was subsequently nationalized. During World War II, prisoners of war were forced to labor in underground cellars on the site manufacturing equipment deemed necessary for the war effort.

At the end of the war, the site was occupied and entrenched by as many as 1,000 soldiers and loyalists, who defended the site even after Germany capitulated. The building itself survived the war relatively unscathed.

While the Soviets occupied the region, the brewery was seized and operated by the state as the VEB Schultheiss-Brauerei in 1945, before ceasing operation in 1967 due to equipment degradation.

After reunification in 1990, the site was transferred to the Treuhandanstalt for redevelopment.

== Kulturbrauerei today ==
Today, regular events, concerts and festivals take place at Kulturbrauerei, such as the popular Lucia Christmas market, which features Scandinavian arts and culture.

Some organisations that settled on the site of the former brewery complex are:

- Kino in der Kulturbrauerei, cinema with eight screens, one of Berlin's first run theatres
- Theater RambaZamba
- P.A.N.D.A. Nicht nur Russisches Theater, event location for Russian concerts, reading etc.
- Literaturwerkstatt Berlin/lyrikline.org
- office and studio of the band 17 Hippies
- Restaurant frannz and frannz Klub (formerly known as Franz-Club)
- Kesselhaus in der Kulturbrauerei|Kesselhaus, event location
- Alte Kantine, event location
- Soda Club, dance club
- Club 23, dance club
- Palais, event location
- Schule für Bildende Kunst und Gestaltung, art school
- Museum in the Kulturbrauerei, museum on everyday life in the GDR, Haus der Geschichte foundation
- Ch. Links Verlag, publishing house
- be.bra verlag, publishing house
- New York University, Berlin branch
- Berlin on Bike, organizer of bicycle tours
- TIC Tourist Information Center
- Quandoo, restaurant reservation platform
