= Kollwitzplatz =

Square in Berlin, Germany

Coordinates: 52.5362°N 13.4171°E

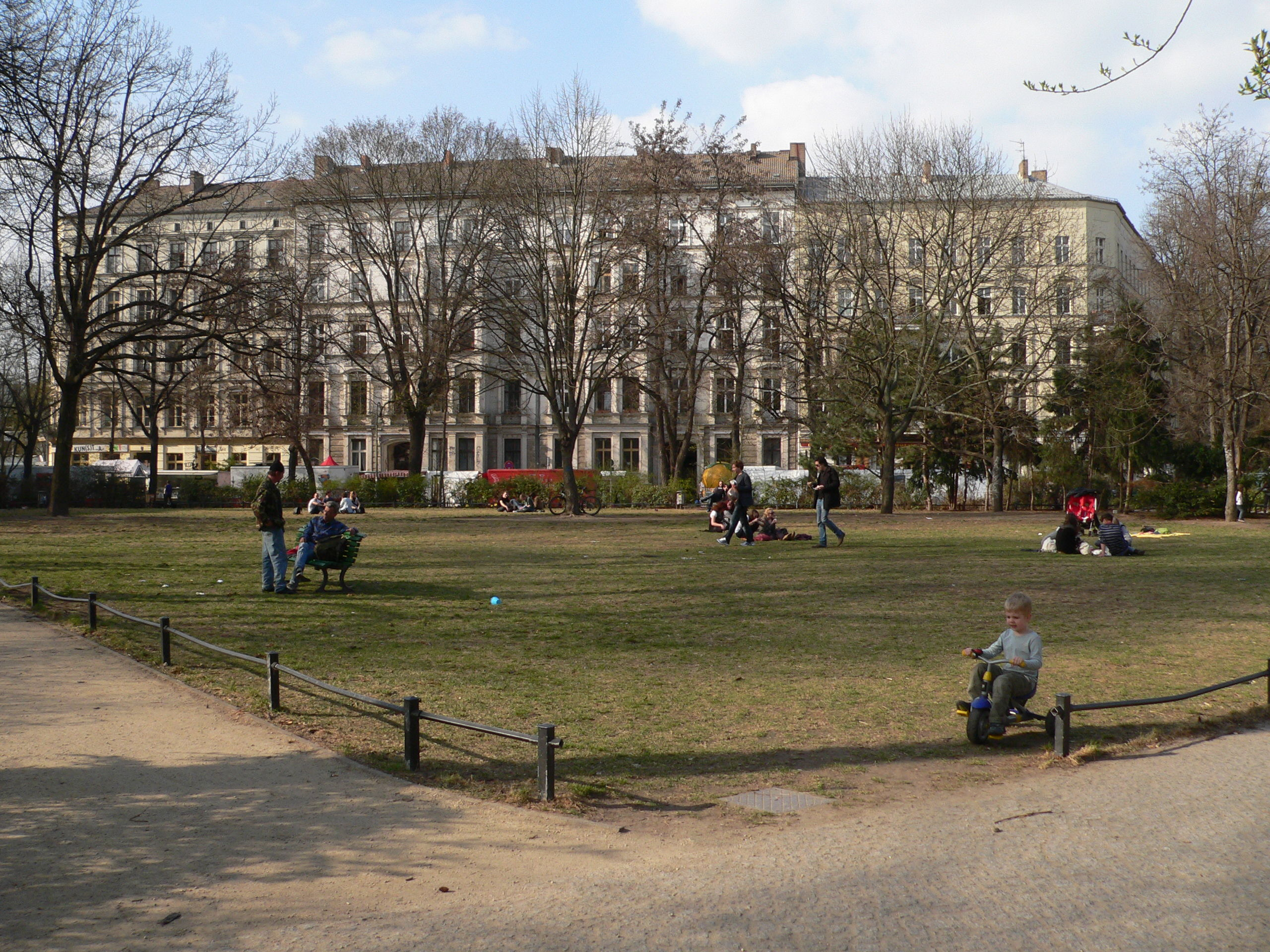
- Location: Berlin
- Area: Prenzlauer Berg
- Created: 1875

Kollwitzplatz is a city square in the Berlin district of Prenzlauer Berg, district of Pankow. The square forms the center of the so-called "Kollwitzkiez". It was named, on 7 October 1947, after the German graphic artist and sculptor Käthe Kollwitz, who spent a large part of her life here in the house at Weissenburger Straße No. 25 (destroyed in the war, since 1947 property Kollwitzstraße No. 56a). Until then, it was called Wörther Platz; a name that was given to it when the area was planned for construction in 1875. Indirectly, this name is also a reminder of her husband Karl Kollwitz, who worked here as a physician until 1940 and thus shaped the area around the square independently of his wife. The triangular complex is bordered by Kollwitzstraße, Knaackstraße and Wörther Straße (with Husemannstraße branching off from it). In total, the square is about 6000 m^{2} in size.

== History ==
The area around the square was bought by the German-Dutch Actien-Bauverein to systematically develop it as a residential area in the Wilhelminian period until 1875. Shortly after the Franco-Prussian War, the square was given the name Wörther Platz after the Battle of Wörth, which, like the surrounding street names, was a reminder of scenes and German commanders of the Franco-Prussian War. From 1885 to 1887, the site was designed as a typical Wilhelminian ornamental square, presumably according to the designs of the then city garden director Hermann Mächtig. During the Second World War, the residential area was largely spared damage, except for three corner plots of the square and the southern Kollwitzstraße. As a result, only a few houses were renovated and modernized by the end of the 1970s. In 1949 Kollwitzplatz was redesigned according to the designs of the garden architect Reinhold Lingner.

In preparation for Berlin's 750th-anniversary celebrations in 1987, some adjacent streets were reconstructed in a historically accurate manner as part of a redevelopment plan.

On 3 October 1990, at midnight on Kollwitzplatz, critics of unity proclaimed the Autonomous Republic of Utopia, known as Micronation, for this one night only.

In the mid-1990s, three of the four empty corner lots were rebuilt. Since German reunification, the residential area around Kollwitzplatz has continuously developed into one of the most expensive residential areas in Prenzlauer Berg.

In June 2017, the Restauration 1900 closed. The restaurant, which was opened for the 750th-anniversary celebration, was the only gastronomic venue on the square during GDR times.

== Commemoration of Käthe and Karl Kollwitz ==
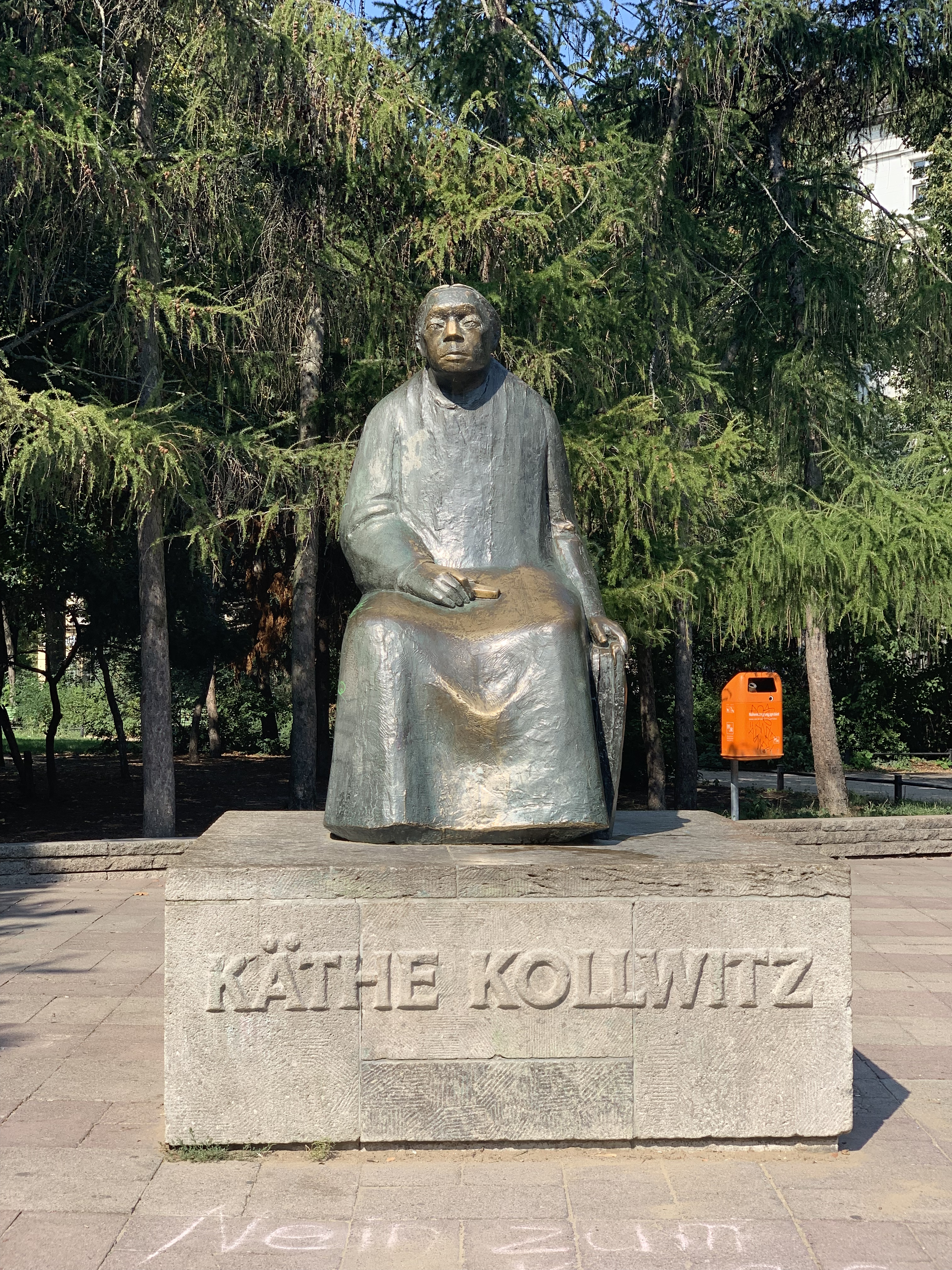
Bildnis der Käthe Kollwitz; Plastik von Gustav Seitz auf dem Kollwitzplatz

In memory of Käthe Kollwitz, who lived here from 1891 to 1943, a sculpture by the artist was erected opposite the site of her residence in 1950 at the suggestion of the sculptor Gustav Seitz. It was a replica of the sculpture Mother with two children, which was made after the Second World War. After the sculpture had been moved next to a newly built house in 1960, it was moved again in 1996, as the corner plot of land that had been uncovered by bomb hits was finally rebuilt with a residential building. On the occasion of Käthe Kollwitz' 120th birthday, the newly erected sculpture on the building of the former Prenzlauer Berg district office at Fröbelstraße 17 was rededicated.

In 1956, Gustav Seitz was commissioned by the East Berlin City Council to create a Kollwitz monument. Based on a self-portrait of the painter, he designed a bronze sculpture, which was erected in the middle of the square in 1961. This sculpture is a work of art especially popular with children and is often used for climbing.

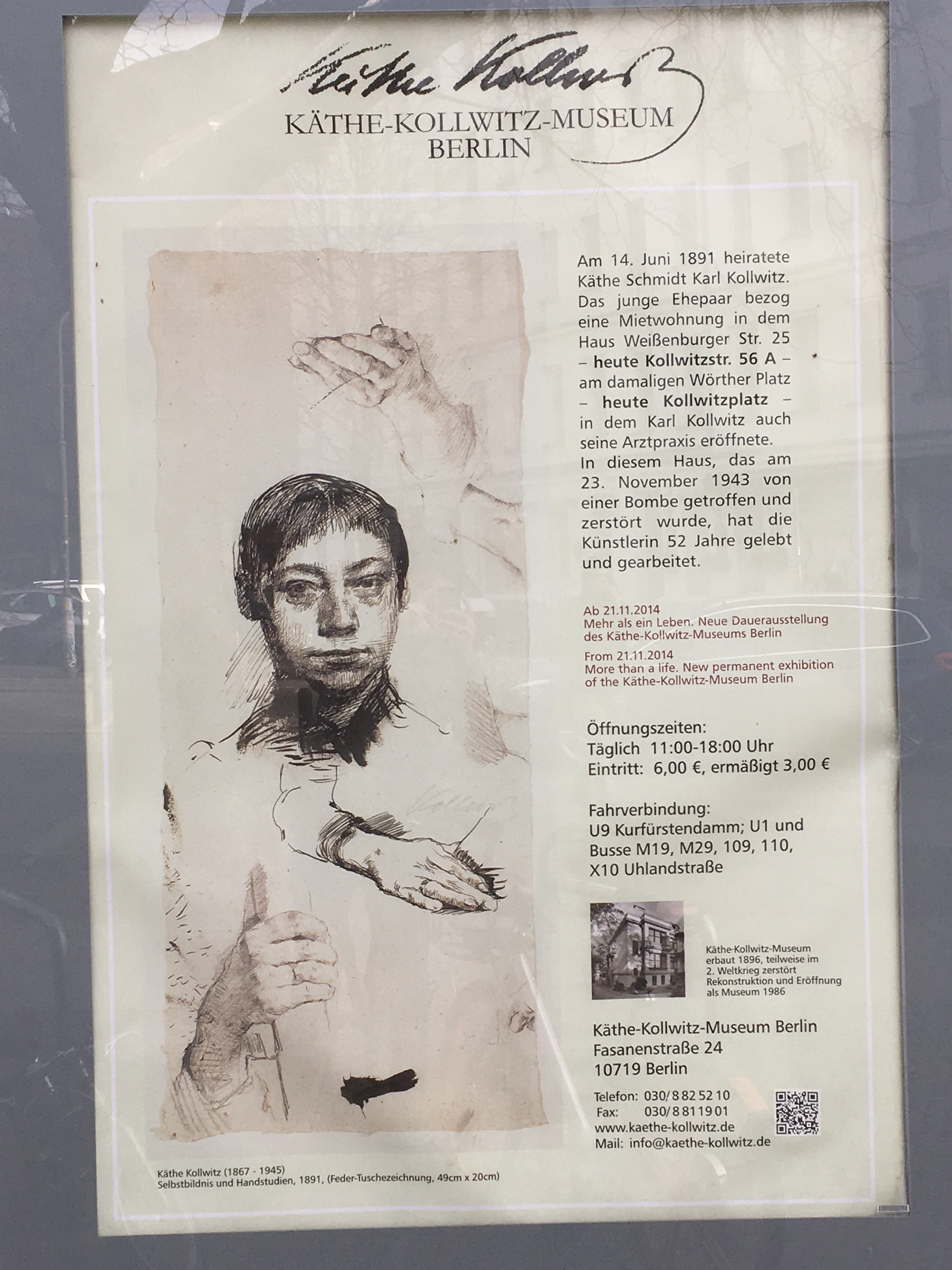
Lightbox in Kollwitzstraße 56a with reference to the Käthe Kollwitz Museum in Berlin-Charlottenburg

In 1997, the Prenzlauer Berg Cultural Office initiated the Denkzeichen competition to commemorate the artist on the site of the former Kollwitzhaus. As a result, the artist Pat Binder exhibited contemporary graphics and photographs in a light box in front of the newly built Kollwitz House on the corner of Knaackstraße in a photo/graphic gallery Käthe Kollwitz, which was supposed to be "committed to the humanistic spirit of Käthe Kollwitz's work". From 1997 to 2006, 29 artistic works were exhibited in this way to the street public; this project was considered an important innovation in the field of artistic commemoration. After the end of the project in 2006, the graphics were added to the collection of the Prenzlauer Berg Museum. At the beginning of 2007 Pat Binder's idea of the light box was taken up by the Käthe Kollwitz Museum Berlin with a new light box installed at this location (see picture), which refers to the museum in Charlottenburg.

== Neighbourhood ==
The neighbourhood is home to the Rykestraße Synagogue (Temple of Peace and Lauder-Beth-Zion School) and the Jewish cemetery (Rykestraße 53). The latter is located east of Schönhauser Allee from Senefelder Platz to Wörther Straße, bordered by their southern residential buildings 1-11, the opposite side of Kollwitzplatz (Knaackstraße 39-45) and the Judengang, which lies behind the Kollwitzstraße properties between Senefelder- and Kollwitzplatz. A typical feature of the neighbourhood is the water tower. The oldest one in Berlin is located between Diedenhofer, Knaack-, Kolarer and Belforter Straße. Two schools belong to the neighbourhood: Schule am Kollwitzplatz and Schule im Hofgarten - 03G45. The former school building Straßburger Straße became a refugee accommodation for 200 people in 2012. In the planning area there are two day-care centres at the school on Kollwitzplatz, one close to the water tower, and Belforter Straße 11. There are two buildings for youth clubs (Saarbrücker Straße 23). The Kulturbrauerei, which is a listed building with its building front along Knaackstraße and the entrance on Sredzkistraße, is part of the neighbourhood. The "Sebastian Haffner Cultural and Educational Centre" is also part of the Pankow adult education centre at Prenzlauer Allee 227/228. The building complex with museum and library at the water tower is located on the northern plot of Mülhauser Straße between Prenzlauer Allee and Kolmarer Straße.

== Markets ==
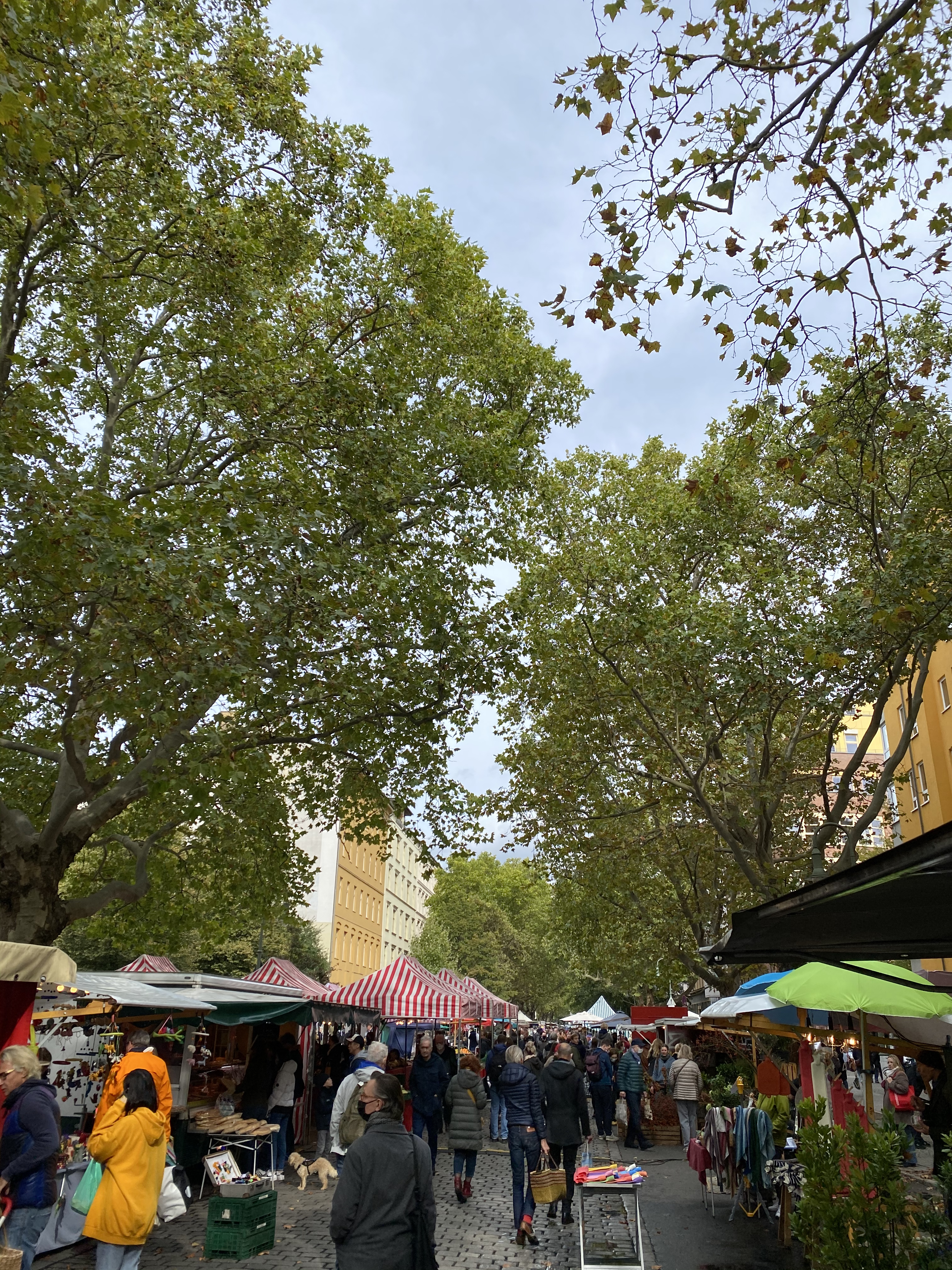
Saturday Market at Kollwitzplatz. October 2020.

Since the year 2000, a weekly market has been held on Kollwitzplatz on Saturdays between 9 a.m. and 6 p.m., an eco-market on Thursdays and a Christmas market on Sundays in Advent. The "Kollwitzmarkt" is one of the most popular markets in Berlin and has become a tourist attraction.

In the mid-1990s, residents had tried to initiate a weekly market on the square, which was prevented at the time by the district office with the argument that the square did not have a suitable area for a market. A spatial solution for the markets was later found in a temporary closure of the section of Wörther Straße located at Kollwitzplatz. Since a section of Wörther Straße was converted into a traffic-calmed area in 2007/2008, parts of the weekly market have been held on the section of Knaackstraße to the west of the square, so that it now extends over half of the streets adjacent to the square. This has led to protests from residents. After a long legal dispute, the market is currently taking place in Kollwitzstraße.

== In the media ==
One of the first key scenes of the action-thriller film Jason Bourne from 2016 takes place on Kollwitzplatz, but the exterior shots for the Berlin section of the film with Matt Damon and Vinzenz Kiefer were shot in 2015 on Falckensteinstraße in Kreuzberg.
