= Lichtblick Kino =

Arthouse cinema in Berlin, Germany

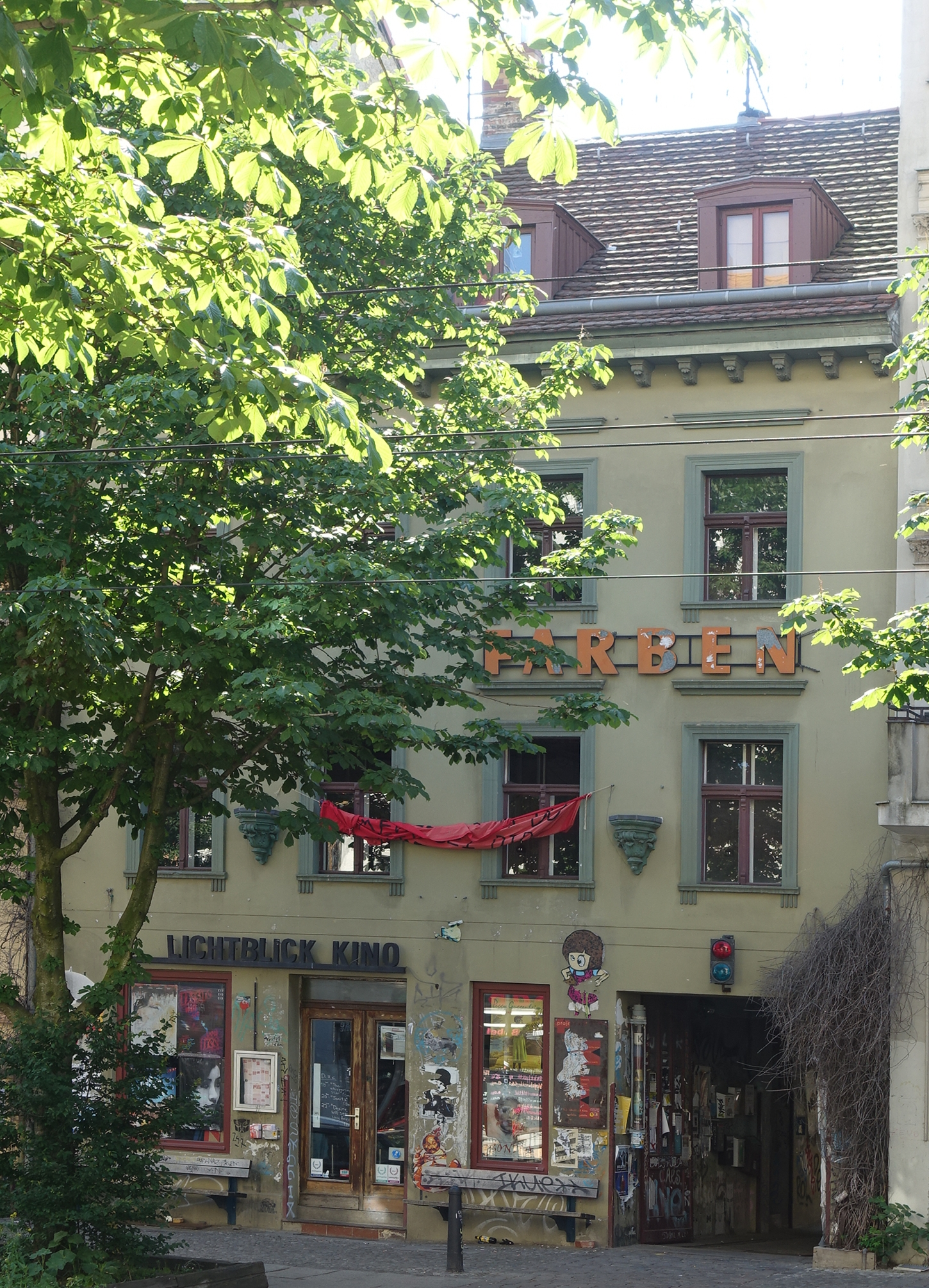
- Lichtblick Kino, as seen from the street
- Interactive map of Lichtblick Kino
- Location: Kastanienallee 77; Berlin, Germany
- Coordinates: 52.53648°N 13.40778°E
- Owner: Collectively owned and run
- Capacity: 32
- Type: Film theatre

Construction
- Opened: 1995

Website
- lichtblick-kino.org

Lichtblick Kino is an independent arthouse cinema, located at Kastanienallee 77 in the Prenzlauer Berg district of Berlin, Germany. The cinema's origins date back to 1994.

== History ==
Lichtblick Kino emerged from Stattkino, an earlier organisation that organised independent cinema screenings. Stattkino presented films in various locations throughout 1994, mostly on political subjects. However, it did not have a permanent location. From this starting point, Lichtblick Kino began operating in 1995, firstly at Wolliner Straße 19. On September 30, 1997, the rental agreement for the Wolliner Straße location came to an end. Lichtblick then reopened, just a few months later, in 1998, in the street-front of the house project at Kastanienallee 77, where it is still located today.

== Programming ==
The programming of Lichtblick focuses on arthouse cinema, classics, documentaries, short films, retrospectives, avant-garde, and surrealist films. The weekend afternoons are dedicated to children's cinema. Since its beginnings, Lichtblick Kino has also pursued the goal of committed political participation in Berlin's cultural life. Every year on February 22nd, the cinema celebrates Luis Buñuel's birthday with film reviews or a gala.

Screenings often take place in the presence of the filmmakers, followed by a discussion with the audience. Many films are also shown in their original version, or in the original language with subtitles. Many film premieres have also already taken place at Lichtblick.

== Principles ==
The cinema has been operated as a collective since it was founded. “We are a collective and want to demonstrate that collective work can function,” is one perspective that the collective has articulated to the press. Instead of hierarchical decisions, the group running the cinema prioritises consensus, and decisions can be vetoed. Lichtblick Kino does not receive any state funding, and foregoes advertising revenue.

Lichtblick Kino and the people who shaped it from the beginning have an impact far beyond showing films: numerous former and current participants are now active in the cinema industry, as distributors, cinema operators or filmmakers. Many projects and initiatives in the Berlin cinema landscape have emerged from Lichtblick.

== Location ==
Lichtblick is a one-room cinema, and one of the smallest cinemas in Berlin. The cinema hall is only around 50 square meters in size, and has 32 seats. The technical equipment is designed for showing both 35mm and 16mm films.

The building at Kastanienallee 77 is the oldest house in Prenzlauer Berg. Today's cinema rooms used to be the living quarters behind a butcher's shop, and the foyer used to be the commercial area of the butcher's shop. Remnants of this previous use can still be seen in the foyer, such as tiles on the walls, and metal brackets on which rods with butcher hooks once hung. The technical equipment is designed for showing both 35mm and 16mm films.
