= Edith Udhardt =

German politician (1929–2024)

Stadtältester von Berlin Edith Udhardt

Member of the Abgeordnetenhaus of Berlin

Personal details
- Born: 28 September 1929 Berlin, Germany
- Died: 7 January 2024 (aged 94) Berlin
- Party: Party of Democratic Socialism (Germany)

Edith Udhardt (28 September 1929 – 7 January 2024) was a German politician. She was a member of the Party of Democratic Socialism (PDS).

== Early life and education ==
Edith Udhardt was born on 28 September 1929.

== Career ==
Udhardt worked as a nurse. Additionally, she was a social activist, especially after her retirement, for example as chairwoman of the social committee, deputy chairwoman of the state senior citizens' advisory board, and founding member of the Prenzlauer Berg women's advisory board in 1992, which merged into the Pankow women's advisory board in 2001.

=== Political career ===
In 1990, Udhardt was elected to the Prenzlauer Berg District Council for the first time, where she was chairwoman of the Social Committee.

In the 1995 Berlin state election, standing for the PDS, she won the direct mandate and was elected to the House of Representatives (Abgeordnetenhaus), where she served for one term until 1999. There she worked on the Petitions Committee.

== Recognition ==
In 2008 she received the city eldership (Stadtältestenwürde) for her social commitment.

== Death ==
Urhardt died on 7 January 2024 in Berlin.
