= Rykestrasse Synagogue =

Synagogue in Berlin

- German: Synagoge Rykestraße
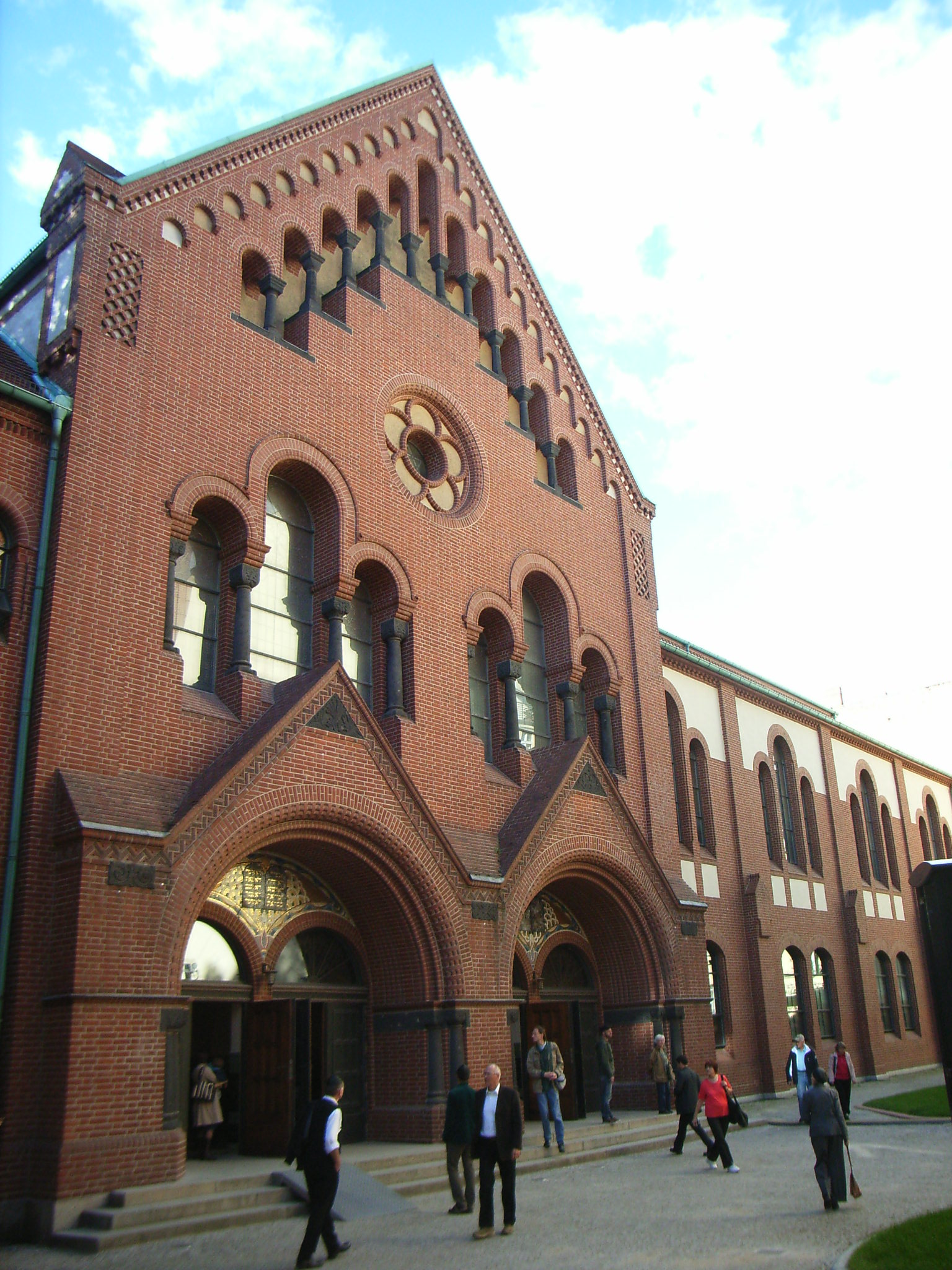
- Entrance from the courtyard of Rykestraße No. 53

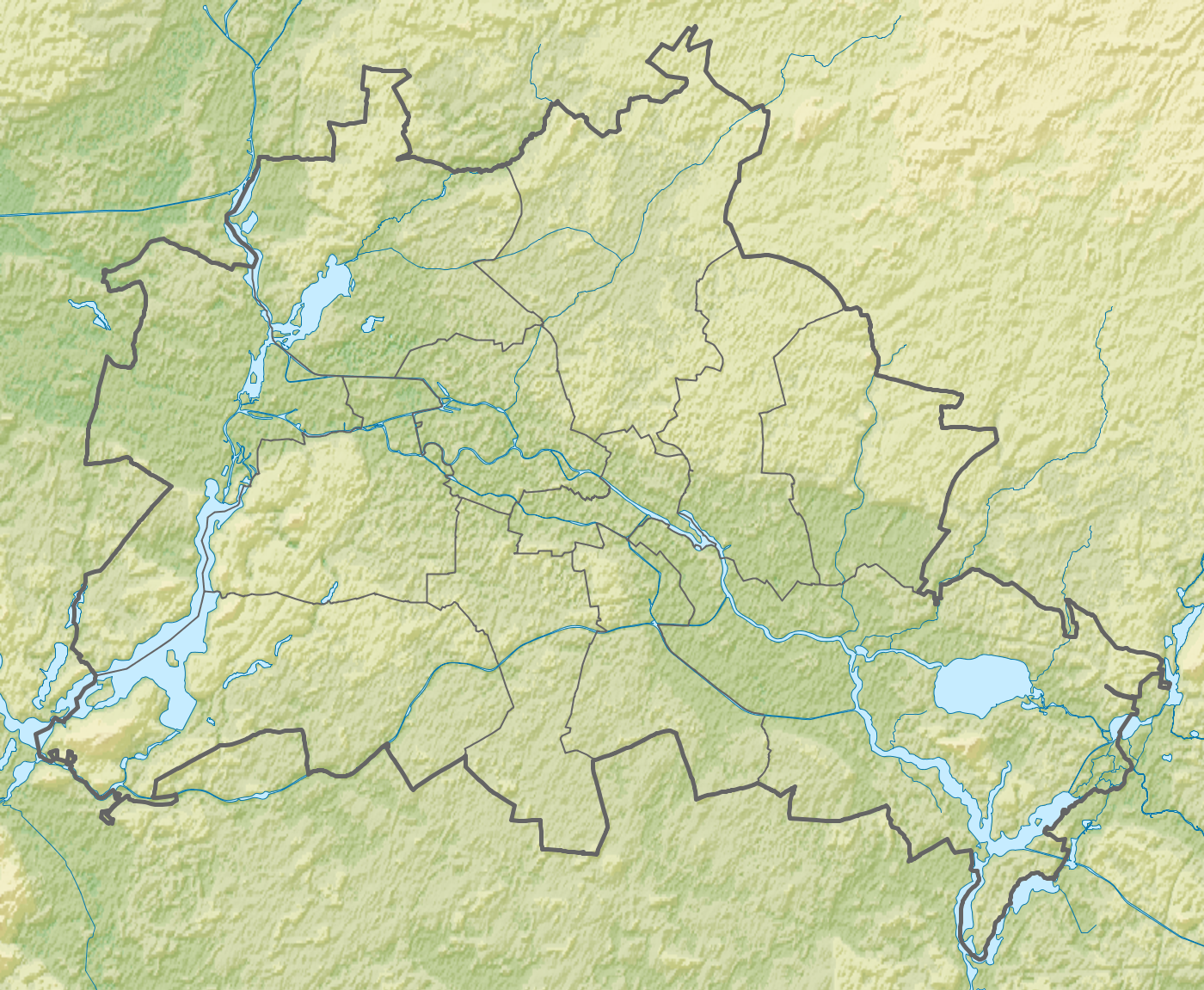
- Location of the synagogue in Berlin

Religion
- Affiliation: Conservative Judaism
- Rite: Nusach Ashkenaz
- Ecclesiastical or organizational status: Synagogue
- Year consecrated: 1904; 1939; 1945
- Status: Active

Location
- Location: Prenzlauer Berg, Pankow, Berlin
- Country: Germany
- Interactive map of Rykestrasse Synagogue
- Coordinates: 52°32′07″N 13°25′07″E

Architecture
- Architects: Johann Hoeniger (1904); Ruth Golan (2007)
- Type: Synagogue architecture
- Style: Romanesque Revival
- Established: c. 1840s (as a congregation)
- Groundbreaking: 1903
- Completed: 1904

Specifications
- Direction of façade: Southeast
- Capacity: 1,074 seats
- Length: 45.78 m (150.2 ft)
- Width: 26.68 m (87.5 ft)
- Height (max): 17.3 m (57 ft)
- Materials: Brick

The Rykestrasse Synagogue (German: Synagoge Rykestraße) is a Conservative Jewish congregation and synagogue, located in the Prenzlauer Berg neighbourhood in the Pankow borough of Berlin, Germany.

Germany's largest synagogue, designed by Johann Hoeniger in the Romanesque Revival style, the synagogue was completed in 1904 and inaugurated on 4 September 1904, in time for Rosh Hashanah. The synagogue stands off the street alignment and is reached by a thoroughfare in the pertaining front building.

== History ==
=== 1920 to 1933 ===
Berlin's Jewish Community (German: Jüdische Gemeinde zu Berlin), comprising the bulk of Jewish faithful of mainstream (also called liberal, in today's English terminology 'conservative'), Orthodox and Reform affiliation, grew strongly in membership in the second half of the 19th century. With the expansion of Berlin into new neighbourhoods, the need of additional synagogues within a walking distance became urgent. However, the Jewish community could not fulfill all the claims for additional premises, so many private synagogues (Vereinssynagogen, literally synagogues of registered associations) emerged scattered over the city. Most Jews in Prenzlauer Berg, however, could not afford to establish a Vereinssynagoge with their own funds. So in 1902 Jüdische Gemeinde zu Berlin bought the site in Rykestraße and its building master, Johann Hoeniger, was commissioned to design and supervise the building of this new synagogue.

Construction started in 1903, and at noon on Sunday, 4 September 1904, the synagogue was inaugurated with Handel's prelude in D major and the Ma Tovu prayer led by cantor David Stabinski (1857–1919), Rabbi Josef Eschelbacher (1848–1916, illuminating the ner tamid) and Rabbi Adolf Rosenzweig (1850–1918) preaching. Almost the complete board (Vorstand) of Jüdische Gemeinde zu Berlin and many members of the elected assembly of representatives (Repräsentantenversammlung) attended the ceremony, while the city of Berlin sent its school councillor Carl Michaelis and Paul Langerhans, president of the city parliament.

In the afternoon of the same day, Berlin's other Jewish community Israelitische Synagogengemeinde Adass Jisroel, solely comprising Orthodox members, opened its own synagogue in Artilleriestraße, today's Tucholskystraße. Five days later, on the eve of Rosh haShana, the Rykestraße Synagogue was used for religious purposes on the first occasion.

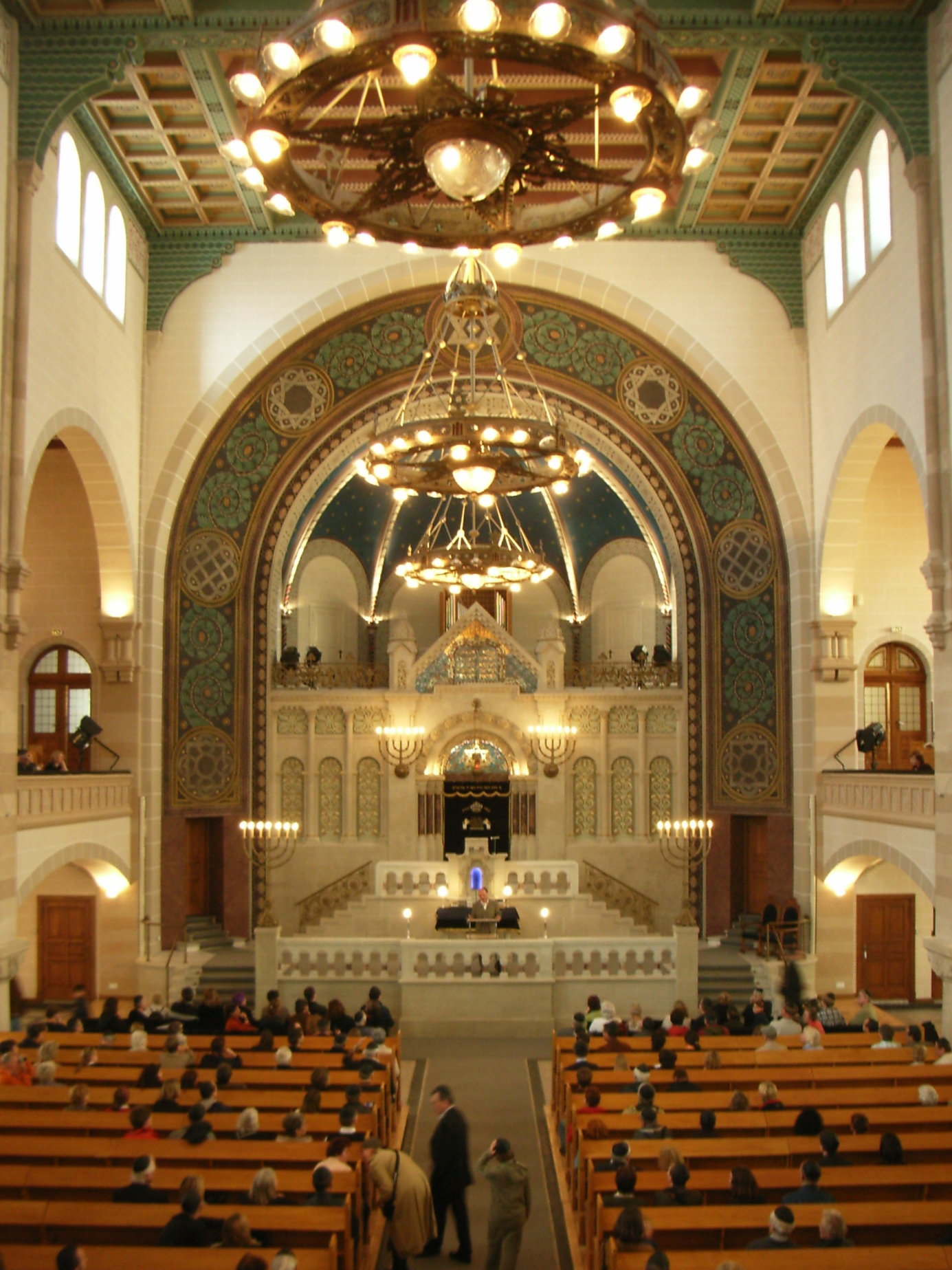
The nave during a guided tour on the occasion of the European Heritage Days in 2007

With its members of different Jewish affiliations, the Jüdische Gemeinde zu Berlin also offered services in its different synagogues following different ceremonial styles. Some followed old style (Alter Ritus), such as the Old Synagogue on Heidereutergasse 4, especially for the members clinging to the so-called intra-community orthodoxy (Gemeindeorthodoxie, as opposed to seceded orthodoxy [Austrittsorthodoxie], the proponents of which had seceded from Jüdische Gemeinde zu Berlin establishing Adass Jisroel in 1869).

Other synagogues applied the new style (Neuer Ritus), often including organ music, (mixed) choirs and additional songs sung in German language.

Each synagogue of Jüdische Gemeinde zu Berlin had its own elected Synagogenvorstand (board of gabba'im), which developed synagogal minhagim including their own peculiarities. Rykestraße Synagogue adopted a compromise minhag close to Alter Ritus. Thus rabbis of mainstream and Orthodox affiliation served the congregants.

The gabba'im decided to allow women and men sitting side by side, despite criticism from some Orthodox members. In this the synagogue equalled the practice in Lützowstraße Synagogue. The plan to install an organ – as realised in Berlin's New Synagogue in 1861 – was given up after a hefty debate. The space in the prayer hall prepared for the organ remained empty.

In 1904, the Jüdische Gemeinde zu Berlin opened a Jewish religious school (VI. Religionsschule) in the front building. During World War I Jüdische Gemeinde zu Berlin engaged Rabbi Martin Joseph as chaplain for Jewish Russian prisoners of war kept in detention centres at Berlin. On the high holidays the German High Command allowed them to attend services in Rykestraße Synagogue.

Joseph Himmel (1872–1943, Theresienstadt) served as president of the gabba'im in the 1910s probably until the 1920s. Orthodox Rabbi Siegfried Alexander (1886–1943, Auschwitz) won the congregants to elect the first woman, Martha Ehrlich (née Eisenhardt; 1896–1942) as gabba'i, equally participating in gabba'i decisions and tasks, however, except of – unlike her male colleagues – calling congregants up to read the Torah. In the 1930s until the closure of the synagogue in 1940, Josef Luster (1886–1943, Auschwitz) presided the board of gabba'im. (Note: He ran a kosher mineral-water and soft-drink factory on a site adjacent to the synagogue in the same block.)

In 1922 a private School Association opened a Jewish school in the front building. The synagogue served the congregants in the Prenzlauer Berg neighbourhood as place of worship and for their rites of passage such as weddings and Bar Mitzvah ceremonies as well as Bat Mitzvah ceremonies starting as of the mid-1920s. On Yom Kippur ceremonies the prayer of Kol Nidrei was skipped, as was typical for Neuer Ritus style. However, this was protested in the 1920s by a group of congregants, the so-called Kol Nidrei demonstrators, who ostentatiously left the main prayer hall shortly before the service on the eve of Yom Kippur and then formed a minyan in the hallway, praying Kol Nidrei there, before returning again to the main hall.

The Israelitisches Familienblatt dedicated an article to the 25th anniversary of the inauguration of the Synagogue, while the gabba'im decided to celebrate a special ceremony on Sunday, 29 September 1929.

Some congregants formed a registered association for the Rykestraße Synagogue (Synagogenverein Rykestraße), promoting strong company among the congregants, organising meetings, festivities, lectures to this end, cherishing Jewish traditions and collecting and donating money for needy congregants (Tzedakah), but also demanding a say at employing rabbis and cantors. In 1931 Hugo Alexander presided over the association.

In January 1933, Sally Heilbrunn, Heinrich Loewe (1869–1951, Tel Aviv) and Rabbi Moritz Freier gathered 300 people protesting the replacement of Michael Sachs' Rödelheim siddur (Siddur Sefat Emet סדור ספת אמת) and machzor by the Berlin unitary siddur and machzor (Einheitsgebetsbuch). On 25 January the same year Synagogenverein gathered for a lecture and made the case for unitary siddur and machzor, denying aiming at Reform but at restoring the minhag as it used to be until by 1928, claiming that most congregants disliked the traditionalist changes since. In the end the protesters prevailed and the Rödelheim siddur and machzor remained in use in Rykestraße Synagogue until today.

=== During World War Two ===
The Nazi dictatorship, with its anti-Semitic discrimination, invidiousnesses, persecutions, and atrocities, changed the lives of German Jewry so thoroughly that disputes on style and traditions fell silent. After the new Nazi government had widely banned Jewish performers, artists and scientists from public stages and lecterns, Rykestraße Synagogue opened for their concerts and lectures organised by Kulturbund Deutscher Juden or benefit performances by Jüdisches Winterhilfswerk (Jewish winter aid endowment) in favour of poor Jews, who had been excluded from government benefits.

On 16 February 1934, the synagogue choir under Kurt Burchard (1877–1942, Auschwitz) enacted for the first time the new Friday night liturgy that had been composed by Jakob Dymont (1881–1956), choirmaster at Adass Jisroel synagogue. Dymont composed it along the melodies of chazzanut following the nussach. Also Dymont's Shabbat morning liturgy was presented in the synagogue. For the 30th anniversary of the synagogue, Rudolf Melnitz reported in Israelitisches Familienblatt that the synagogue had attracted more people and that, with Orthodox and mainstream rabbis officiating, Rykestraße congregation enjoyed a unique richness.

The synagogue did not burn during the November Pogrom, then euphemised as Kristallnacht on 9 November 1938, when Nazis attacked in well organised pogroms synagogues and Jewish businesses. Instead the Nazis ordered – as in other comparable sites too (Note: The synagogue in Berlin's Pestalozzistraße was not set on fire at the November Pogrom due to its location inside a block, the synagogue in Augsburg weathered it, because it neighboured a compound of kerosine tanks, the synagogue in Lübeck, because it stood (and still stands) almost wall to wall to the city's Museum of Art and Culture, etc.) – a "mere" vandalisation and destruction of furnishings, since the synagogue is located within a block of residential buildings. A fire ignited and burning torah scrolls and smashed furniture was soon extinguished before spreading to the actual building. Many windows had been destroyed. Rabbis and other male congregants were arrested and taken to Sachsenhausen concentration camp.

Jüdische Gemeinde zu Berlin mended the synagogue, one of the few little-destroyed ones in Berlin, and reopened it on the eve of Pessach 1939 (3 April). Regular Jewish ceremonies could be held until, on 12 April 1940, Jüdisches Nachrichtenblatt announced that services would not held be any more in Rykestraße and in the also reopened New Synagogue until further notice. That was the usual way in which Nazi prohibitions were publicised.

The Jewish school in the front building was forced to close in 1941. However, the Jewish community formally remained proprietor of the site. In May 1942 the borough of Prenzlauer Berg declared its will to acquire the site paying the ridiculous sum of 191,860 reichsmark (ℛℳ), and effectively on 1 September 1944 the site was conveyanced to the borough. When on 6 May 1943 the Jewish community applied at the Gestapo for a sale permission, since all its property was under custodianship as were any sales proceeds, it named the Heeresstandortverwaltung I Berlin (German Army garrison administration no. I) as the tenant of the entire site, except for two little apartments in the front building still rented out to residential tenants.

The oft-mentioned usage of the synagogue by the Wehrmacht as a horse barn is unproven and unlikely. There were no premises and remainders found in the synagogue indicating that usage. Instead it is reported that furniture was stored in the prayer hall. The furnishings (chandeliers, lustres, menorot, ner tamid, cupper coverings of doors) of the synagogue made from non-ferrous metal, which was scarce and much needed for war production, were not dismantled.

=== Post WWII ===
The prayer hall lacked most of its benches, and the aron kodesh was screened off by a raw provisional wall built after April 1940. Sanitary installations had been dismantled and the destroyed windows exposed the interior to the impact of weather. Erich Nehlhans (1899–1950, Soviet Gulag), who survived the Shoah living underground, the new president of Jüdische Gemeinde zu Berlin much promoted the reopening of Rykestraße Synagogue. He informed the city council that on Friday, 13 July 1945, the first shabbat ceremony was held, also attended by Soviet City Commander Nikolai Berzarin, however using the better preserved and smaller weekday prayer hall. On 29 July 1945 Rabbi Martin Riesenburger could celebrate the first Jewish wedding there since the closure of the synagogue in 1940. Jewish displaced persons, who survived the Shoa and were stranded in Berlin, used to live in the front building.

The great prayer hall was provisionally refurnished with benches. A new central bimah replaced the original one located directly in front of the aron qodesh and thus also screened off by the wall. Services were held on Rosh Hashana 1945 and Pessach 1946, before another closure for a more serious refurbish 1946/1947.

=== In the GDR era ===
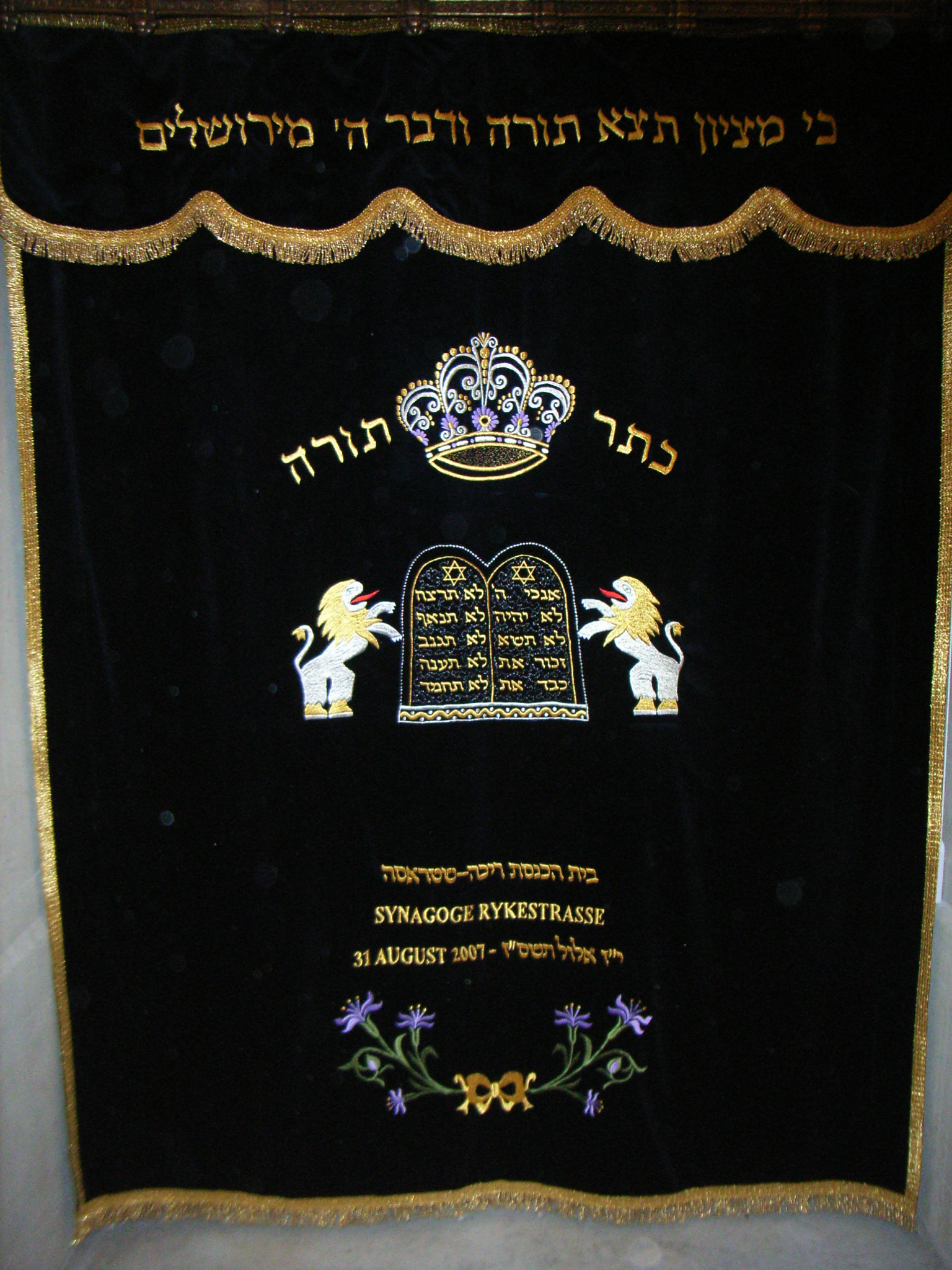
The parochet of the aron qodesh.

In 1952 Heinz Galinski, since 1949 the president of still´undivided Jüdische Gemeinde zu Berlin, commissioned Heinz Juliusberger, head of its construction department, to prepare and supervise an extensive renovation of the synagogue, being the sole functioning synagogue in the eastern sector of Berlin. Material unavailable in the communist planning system, such as zinc to repair the roof, were bought in West Berlin and brought over. The provisional wall was demolished reopening the access to the aron qodesh and the original bimah, so that the central bimah, disliked by Riesenburger, could be removed again.

During the course of the anti-Semitic campaigns in Czechoslovakia during the Slánský trial, GDR authorities arrested and interrogated Jews living in East Germany. The Stasi searched community offices all over the GDR, leading to renewed exodus from the GDR by Jews. West Berlin permitted these migrants and within several months, between 500 and 600 Jews crossed over. (Note: 556 Jews filed for refuge in West Berlin until March 1953 with prior c. 2,500 Jews in East Berlin and another 2,000 in East Germany proper.)

Berlin's Chief Rabbi Nathan Peter Levinson then urged Galinski, who rather maintained a low political profile after the Soviets had deported his predecessor, to warn Jews in the east of the upcoming persecution, which he did by way of a press conference held in West Berlin. Communist Volkskammer deputy Julius Meyer (1909–1979), president of the union of Jewish congregations in East Germany (not including Jüdische Gemeinde zu Berlin), was interrogated between 6 and 8 January, when GDR officials prompted him to declare in the name of the Jewish community that there is no anti-Semitism in communist states, that Israel is a fascist state and that he acknowledges the Slánský trial. Meyer refused and fled to West Berlin in the night after the Doctors' plot started on 13 January 1953. (Note: Also the presidents of the Jewish congregations of Dresden, Erfurt, and Leipzig escaped to the West.)

Hoping to spare themselves from further persecution, members of Jüdische Gemeinde zu Berlin in East Berlin formed a new provisional executive board only competent for the eastern sector on 21 January, thus establishing Jüdische Gemeinde von Groß-Berlin (i.e. Jewish congregation of Greater Berlin), dividing Berlin's Jewish community. Rykestraße congregant Georg Heilbrunn (1887–1971; brother of the aforementioned Sally Heilbrunn), president of the Rykestraße gabba'im, was elected member of the East Berlin community board. On 25 January the GDR started a wave of arrests of Jews.

So there were Jüdische Gemeinde zu Berlin and Jüdische Gemeinde von Groß-Berlin, one western one eastern, when Riesenburger re-inaugurated Rykestraße Synagogue on Sunday, 30 August 1953, giving it the name "Friedenstempel" (English: Temple of Peace). Georg Heilbrunn and Israel Rothmann held speeches, the latter praising the great Soviet Union and the GDR government. The latter sent Arnold Zweig and Robert Havemann as its representatives. However, an arson attack on the day before cast a pall on the re-inauguration. The naming "Friedenstempel" did not prevail.

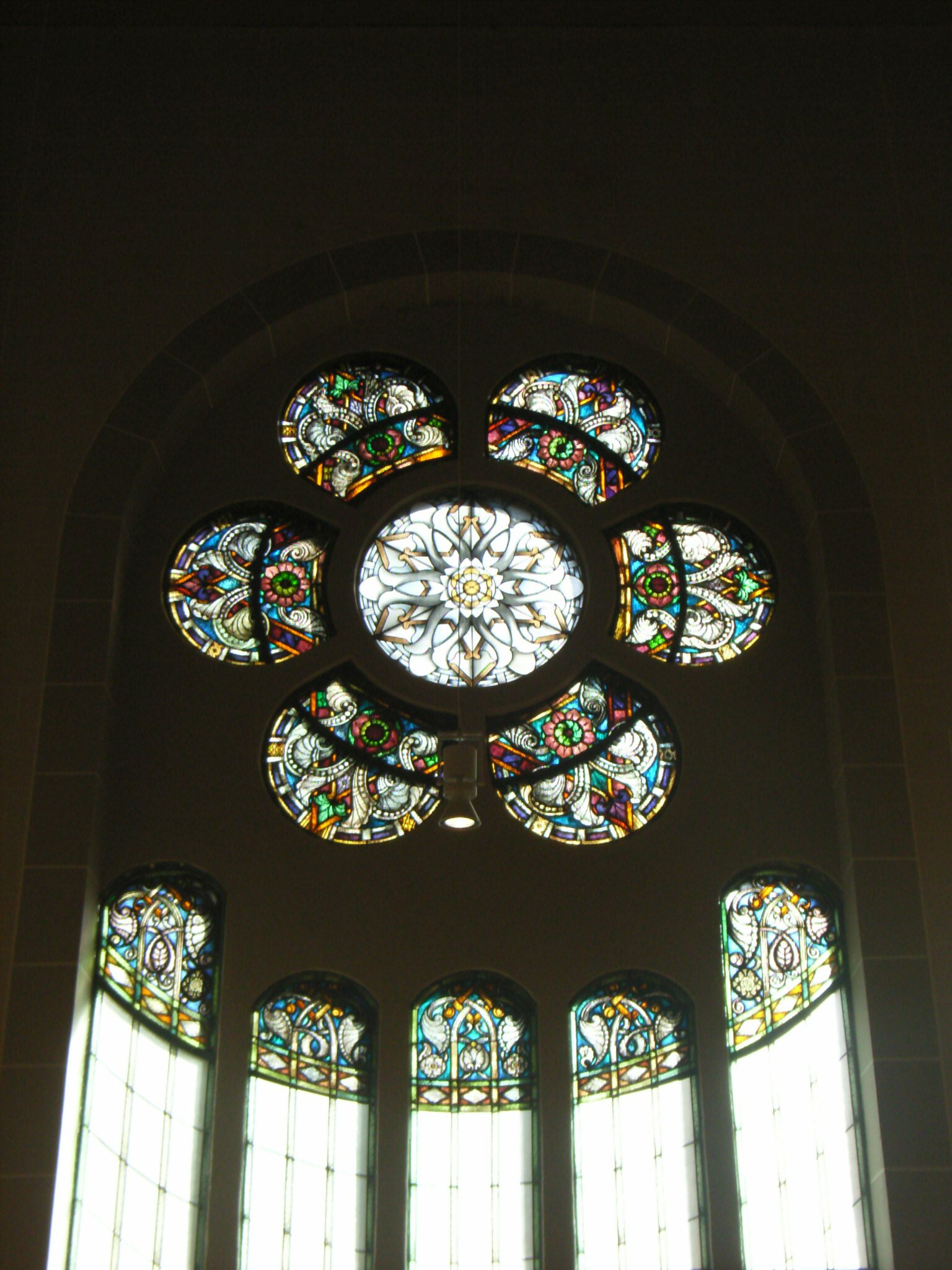
Stained glass rose window at the southwestern gable of the nave.

Further repairs followed in 1957 and 1967, but funds for houses of worship were in short supply from an atheist-oriented government. After the erection of the Berlin Wall the number of members of the Jewish community in the eastern sector of Berlin amounted to about 3,000 persons.

On Sunday, 11 March 1962, Rabbi Riesenburger, who was also an organist, inaugurated an organ installed for the first time in the preserved location, which he played in concerts of traditional Berlin synagogal organ music. Still in use today, this instrument, a single keyboarded church organ of famous organ builder Sauer (Frankfurt upon Oder) is used sometimes for concerts and some religious services as wedding ceremonies.

On Tuesday, 1 September 1964, Jüdische Gemeinde von Groß-Berlin celebrated the 60th anniversary of the Synagogue. Leipzig's Jewish cantor Werner Sander directed the concert of the Leipziger Synagogalchor accompanied by West Berlin's cantors Estrongo Nachama (1918–2000) or Leo Roth (1921–2004), with Riesenburger preaching. After his death in 1965 Riesenburger was succeeded by Rabbi Ödön Singer. After he returned to Hungary in 1969 the position remained vacant.

On 21 September 1976 East Berlin registered Rykestraße Synagogue as a monument, so public subsidies flowed for the renovations in 1986/1987. On Rosh haShana 1987 (23 September) Isaac Newman assumed his office as rabbi for Jüdische Gemeinde von Berlin (after 1970 the Groß had been skipped). However, congregation and rabbi were disappointed of each other so Newman returned to the United States in May 1988. On 25 February 1988 the GDR government reversed the property transfer of 1944, thus Jüdische Gemeinde von Berlin (East) held again property title to the Synagogue. However, as the long practice showed since 1945, it was not the property title, in any case it was discretionarily not respected by the communist East German rulers, which allows the de facto usage, but usage depended on the pure goodwill of the rulers. By 1990 the community counted a mere 200 members and no longer had a rabbi. On 1 January 1991 the small Jüdische Gemeinde von Berlin (East) and the much bigger Jüdische Gemeinde zu Berlin (West) reunited.

=== After unification ===
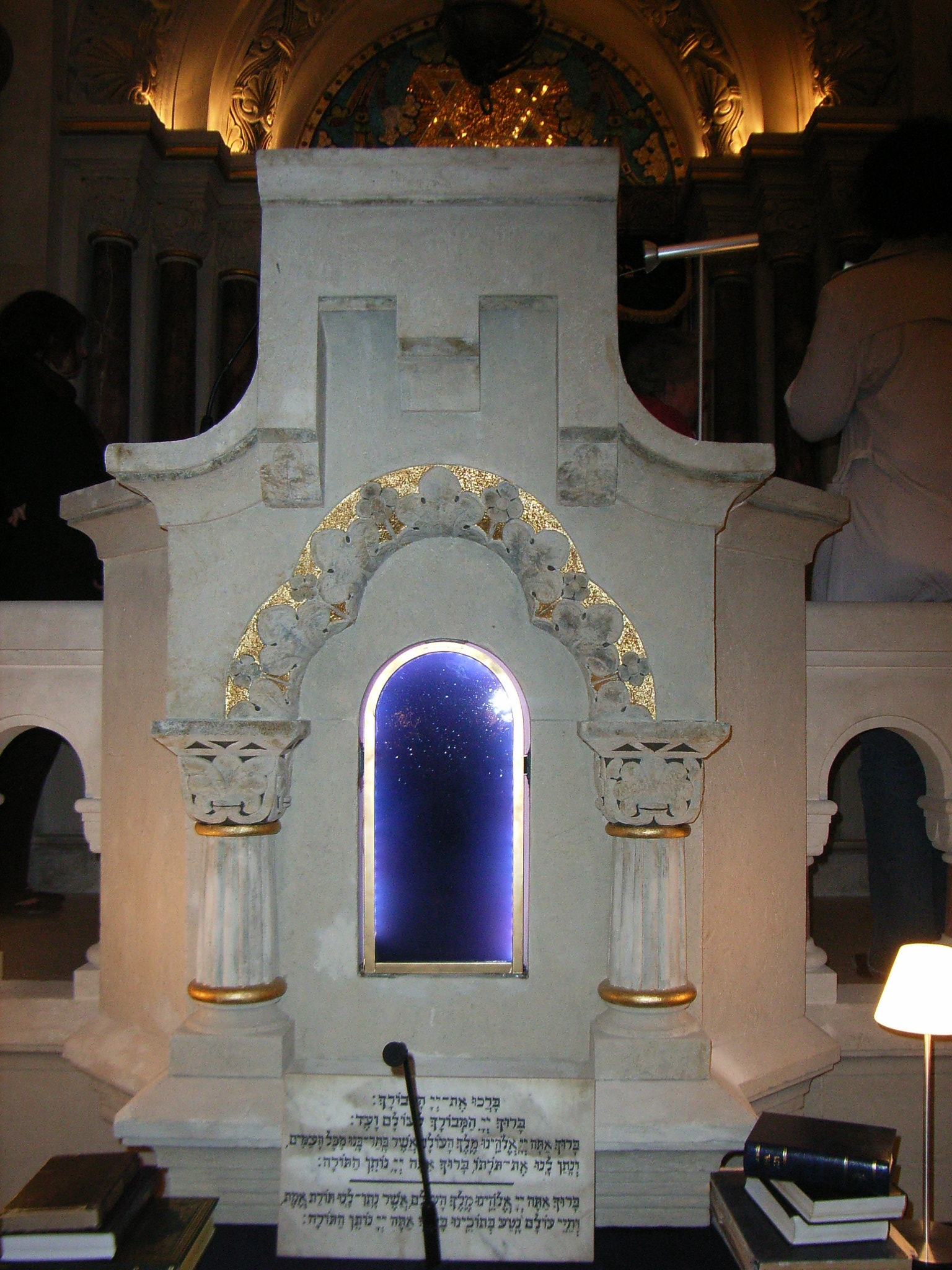
The lectern for preaches in front of the aron kodesh.

On 12 September 2004, the centenary of Rykestrasse synagogue was solemnly celebrated, cantor Jochen Fahlenkamp singing "Adoshem Malach" by former Rykestrasse choir conductor and composer Jakob Dymont (1860–1956).

The synagogue's interior, which now seats up to 1,074 people, originally sat 2,000. After more than a year of work to restore its prewar splendor, it was rededicated on 31 August 2007, this time as an Orthodox synagogue, with separate seating and an Orthodox Minyan. The inauguration saw rabbis bringing the Torah to the synagogue, in a ceremony witnessed by political leaders and Holocaust survivors from around the world.

"It is now the most beautiful synagogue in Germany," the cultural affairs director of the Jüdische Gemeinde zu Berlin, Peter Sauerbaum, said.

Today, Berlin has the largest Jewish community in Germany, with 12,000 registered members and eight synagogues.

=== Visiting the synagogue ===
Public tours through the Rykestrasse Synagogue are available on Thursdays between 14:00 and 18:00 and Sundays between 11:00 and 16:00. Tours are offered in German; an English tour starts at 16:00 on Thursdays. Entry is permitted until 17:30 pm and no entry is permitted at any other time.

Services are held on Friday nights and Saturday mornings.

The Synagogue can easily be accessed by public transport through the underground line U2 (stations Senefelderplatz and Eberswalder Strasse) and the tramway line M2 (stations Knaackstrasse and Marienburger Strasse).

== Clergy ==
Since the archives of Jüdische Gemeinde zu Berlin were mostly destroyed following the compulsory dissolution of the community by the Nazi government exact years of office cannot be given. The rabbis also alternately served at other synagogues of Jüdische Gemeinde, some restricting themselves to only Alter Ritus or Neuer Ritus synagogues, some serving wherever the gabba'im invited them.

The following individuals are known to have served as rabbis of the congregation:

Ordinal	Officeholder	Term stated	Term ended	Time in office	Notes
1	Siegmund Maybaum				Mainstream
2	Josef Stier				Mainstream
3	Josef Eschelbacher	1899			Orthodox
4	Samson Hochfeld	1907	1921	13–14 years	Mainstream; died in office
5	Dr. Siegfried Alexander	April 1924	November 1938	13–14 years	Orthodox; Perished in Auschwitz in 1943.
6	Dr. Moritz "Moshe" Freier	1926	November 1938	11–12 years	Orthodox; husband of Recha Freier
7	Ezechiel Landau				Orthodox
8	Wilhelm Lewy				Orthodox
9	Dr. Israel Nobel				Orthodox
10	Dr. Markus Petuchowski	1866	1926		Orthodox; father-in-law of Tobias Jakobovits
11	Dr Max Weyl	1917	c. 1942	24–25 years	Orthodox; deported to Theresienstadt in 1942; graduate of Rabbinerseminar für das Orthodoxe Judentum, however mainstream), tutoring the world's first female Rabbi Regina Jonas. (Note: Weyl also served in the synagogue Kaiserstraße, New Synagogue and Lindenstraße.)
12	Manfred Swarsensky	c. 1932	November 1938	5–6 years	Mainstream
−	No services at Rykestraße Synagogue between April 1940 and July 1945				
13	Martin Riesenburger	July 1945	1965	19–20 years	Died in office (Note: Jüdische Gemeinde employed Riesenburger on 1 June 1933, he was ordained rabbi in 1939, practising until June 1943, then occupied at Weißensee Cemetery to perform Jewish burials of the deceased among the few Jews still living in Berlin, mostly Jews living in a so-called mixed marriage.)
14	Ödön Singer	1965	1969	3–4 years	
−	vacant from 1969 until 1987				
15	Isaac Newman	September 1987	May 1988	0–1 years	
−	vacant from 1988 until 1990				
−	Reunited with the rabbis of Jüdische Gemeinde zu Berlin, since 1 January 1991				

== See also ==
- History of the Jews in Germany
- List of synagogues in Germany (in German)
