= Eberswalder Straße station =

Station of the Berlin U-Bahn

Coordinates: 52°32′31″N 13°24′44″E

Eberswalder Straße
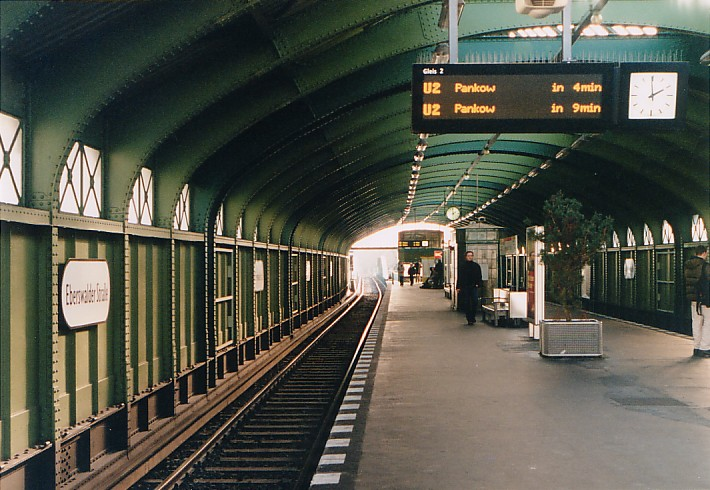

General information
- Location: Prenzlauer Berg
- Owner: Berliner Verkehrsbetriebe
- Operator: Berliner Verkehrsbetriebe
- Platforms: 1 island platform
- Tracks: 2
- Train operators: Berliner Verkehrsbetriebe

Construction
- Structure type: Elevated

History
- Opened: 27 July 1913; 113 years ago

Services
Preceding station	Berlin U-Bahn	Following station
Senefelderplatz towards Ruhleben	U2	Schönhauser Allee towards Pankow
Route map
Location

Eberswalder Straße is an elevated station located on the U2 line of the Berlin U-Bahn network. It is located in the Prenzlauer Berg area of the city on Schönhauser Allee, a major street running from the city centre north towards Pankow.

The station is a raised iron structure on stone columns, designed by architect Alfred Grenander.

== History ==
The station opened in 1913 as Danziger Straße. It was severely damaged in December 1943 and was also closed during the last months of World War II.

The post-war division of Berlin put it in the Russian sector. In 1950 it was renamed Dimitroffstrasse, in honour of Bulgarian communist leader Georgi Dimitrov who had died in the previous year.

In 1991, following the reunification of Germany, the station's name was changed in order to remove its political links. The station was named Eberswalder Straße, a street that crosses Schönhauser Allee very nearby.

A local landmark below the elevated tracks at the south end of the station is Konnopke's Imbiß, a well-known fast food stand that sells currywurst. Max Konnopke started selling sausages on the same spot in 1930 from a board strapped around his neck. In 1960 he built the hut that served as the food stand until replaced by a new construction in 2011.

== Gallery ==
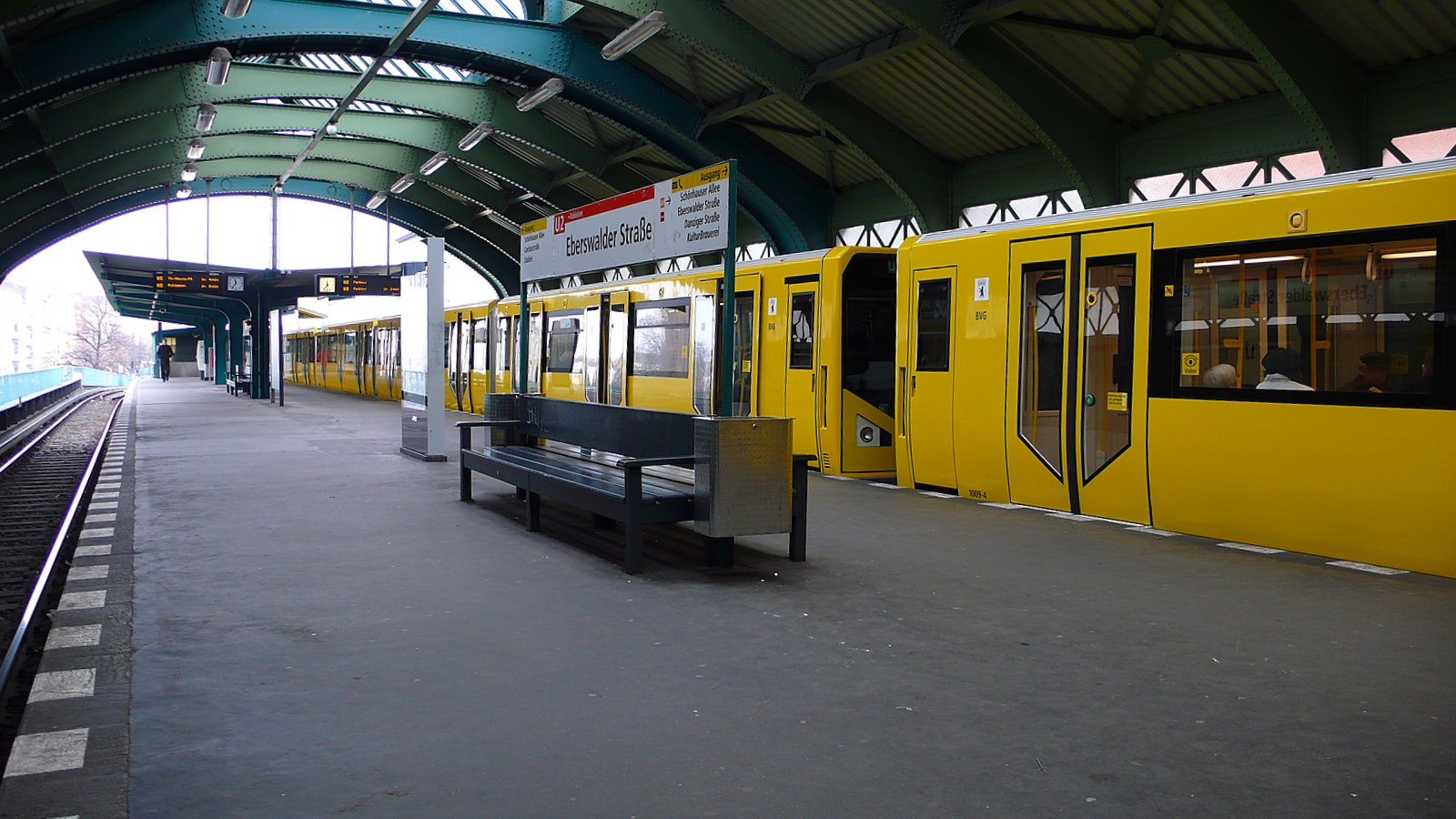
Platform
