= Annemarie Bostroem =

German poet, playwright, and lyricist

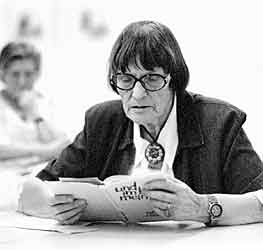
Annemarie Bostroem in 2003

Annemarie Bostroem (24 May 1922 – 9 September 2015) was a German poet, playwright, and lyricist. She lived most recently in the Prenzlauer Berg neighborhood of Berlin.

== Career and life ==
Bostroem was born to a family of doctors in Leipzig. Having attended schools in Munich and Königsberg, she studied theatre studies and German studies in Leipzig, Berlin and Vienna during World War II. From 1944 to her death in 2015, she lived in Berlin. From 1946 to 1954, Bostroem was an Associate of construction-stage sales, where she wrote poetry and plays. This was a special reputation she acquired as a Nachdichterin (adaptators of works into several languages on the basis of interlinear versions in 95 anthologies and Single, about 100,000 lines of verse).

Her first poetry book was Terzinen des Herzens (1947), but was rejected ideologically in the Soviet occupation zone of East Germany, and was censored in 1975. Nevertheless, the book was successful in the GDR with approximately 100,000 copies sold.

Bostroem was married to Friedrich Eisenlohr (1889–1954), another journalist, dramaturge, writer and publisher. She died in Berlin on 9 September 2015.

== Awards ==
- Lyrikpreis Tägliche Rundschau (1946)
- Ehrengabe der Deutsche Schillerstiftung, Weimar

== Bibliography ==
- Terzinen des Herzens, Gedichte (1947, Rupert-Verlag / 1951–1986 Insel-Verlag (teilw. zensiert) / 1999 Ackerpresse / 2012 Razamba with afterword by Nora Gomringer).
- Die Kette fällt, Schauspiel in 7 Bildern (UA 1948, Chemnitz).
- 99 Kreuzworträtsel-Limericks (1990, Eulenspiegel-Verlag).
- Terzinen des Herzens – Gedichte und Nachdichtungen (1986, Leipzig).
- Lieder nach Gedichten von Annemarie Bostroem. Fünf Lieder für hohe Stimme von Ulrich Vogel (1998, Leipzig: Martin Krämer).
- Gedichte und Nachdichtungen, in Anthologien im In- und Ausland.
