= Prenzlauer Berg =

- Ortsteil of Berlin
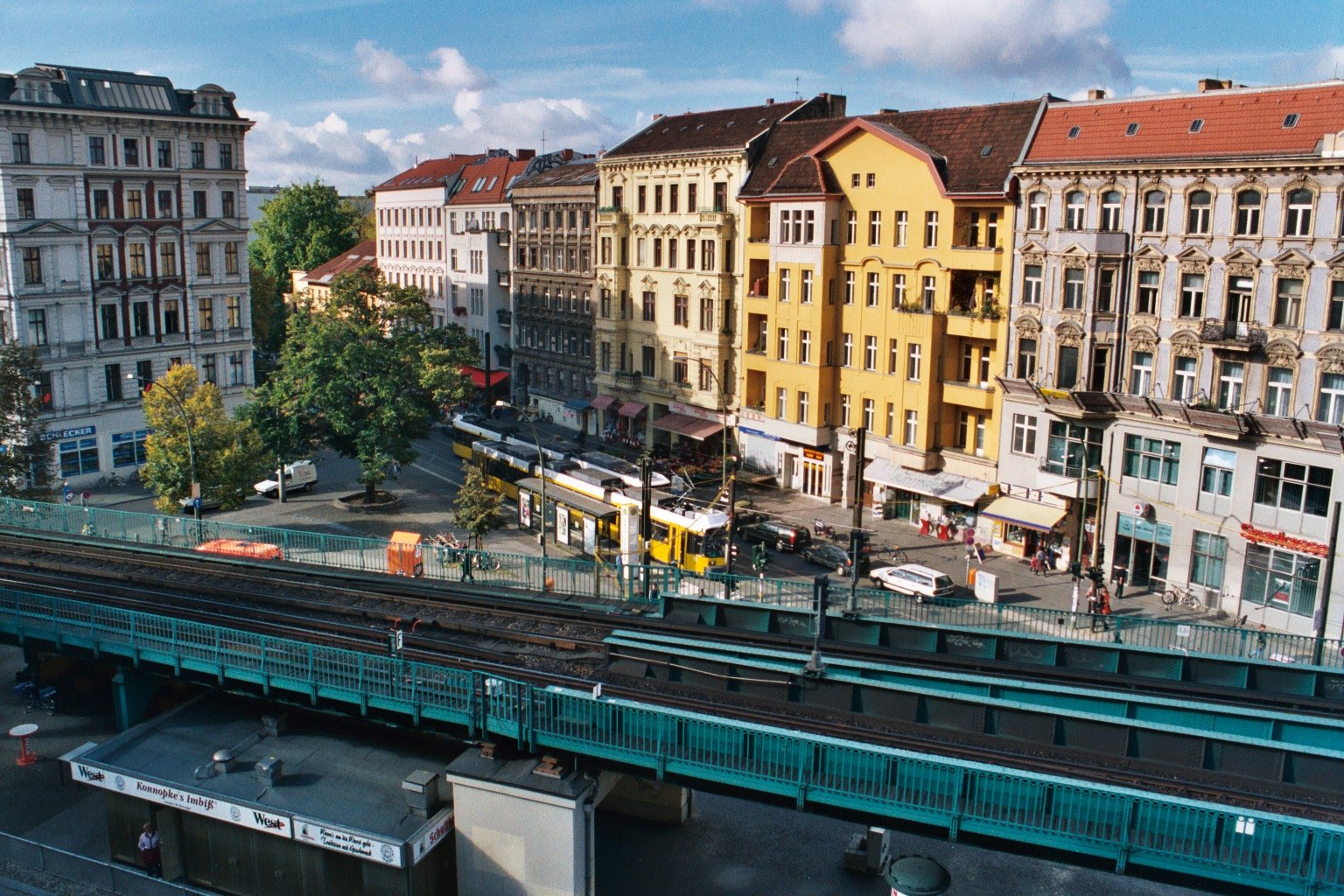
- Kastanienallee/Schönhauser Allee

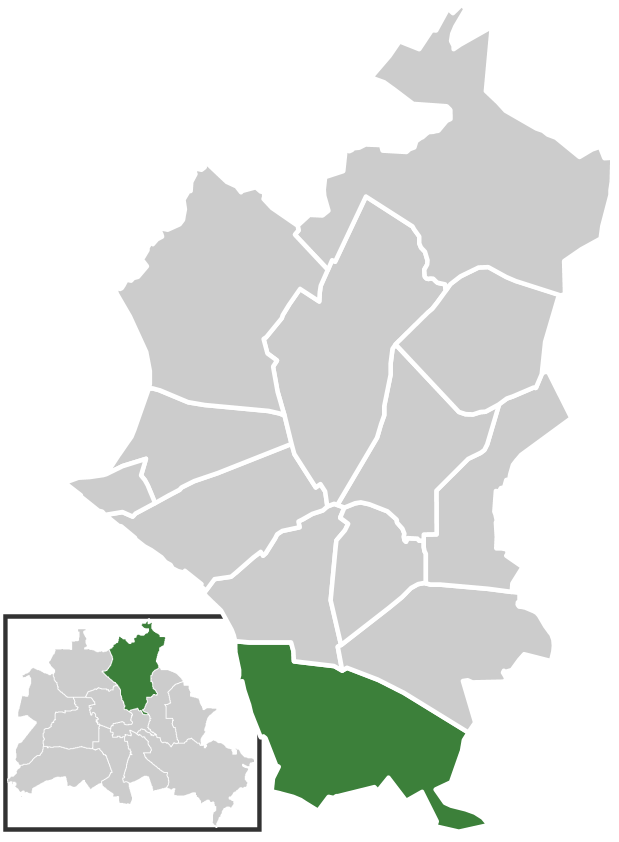
- Location of Prenzlauer Berg in Pankow district and Berlin
- Interactive map of Prenzlauer Berg
- Location within Germany Location within Berlin
- Coordinates: 52°32′21″N 13°25′27″E
- Country: Germany
- State: Berlin
- City: Berlin
- Borough: Pankow

Area
  - Total: 10.955 km^{2} (4.230 sq mi)
- Elevation: 91 m (299 ft)

Population (2024-12-31)
  - Total: 169,882
  - Density: 15,507/km^{2} (40,164/sq mi)
- Time zone: UTC+01:00 (CET)
  - Summer (DST): UTC+02:00 (CEST)
- Postal codes: 10405, 10407, 10409, 10435, 10437, 10439, 10119, 10247, 10249
- Vehicle registration: B

Prenzlauer Berg (German pronunciation: [ˌpʁɛnt͡slaʊ̯ɐ ˈbɛʁk]) is a locality of Berlin, forming the southerly and most urban district of the borough of Pankow. From its founding in 1920 until 2001, Prenzlauer Berg was a district of Berlin in its own right. However, that year it was incorporated (along with the borough of Weißensee) into the greater district of Pankow.

From the 1960s onward, Prenzlauer Berg was associated with proponents of East Germany's diverse counterculture including Christian activists, bohemians, state-independent artists, and the gay community. It was an important site for the peaceful revolution that brought down the Berlin Wall in 1989. In the 1990s the borough was also home to a vibrant squatting scene. It has since experienced rapid gentrification.

== Geography ==
Prenzlauer Berg is a portion of the Pankow district in northeast Berlin. To the west and southwest it borders Mitte, to the South Friedrichshain-Kreuzberg, to the east Lichtenberg, and to the north Weißensee and Pankow.

Geologically, the borough straddles the southernmost edge of the Barnim glacial deposit formed during the last Ice Age. Prenzlauer Berg (literally Prenzlau Hill) was always seen as a hill by the inhabitants of historic Berlin situated to the south in the glacial valley along the river Spree. Until the 20th century the area was mostly referred to as "Windmill Hill". The coat of arms of the former Prenzlauer Berg district, featuring four black windmill sails on a golden shield, recall the heyday of windmills in Berlin.

The highest point of the district is 91 meters above sea level in the northwest of Volkspark Prenzlauer Berg. This hill consists of the rubble from buildings that were destroyed in World War II during allied air raids and by Soviet artillery in the Battle of Berlin.

== Cityscape ==
Prenzlauer Berg is characterized by Wilhelmine buildings, that were erected at the turn of the 20th century (1889 to 1905). Over 80% of all housing in this area was constructed before 1948, with the oldest building still standing being from 1848 at Kastanienallee 77. Though substantial, there was less war-related destruction here than in other parts of the city, which were almost entirely wiped out by the allied bombing campaign.

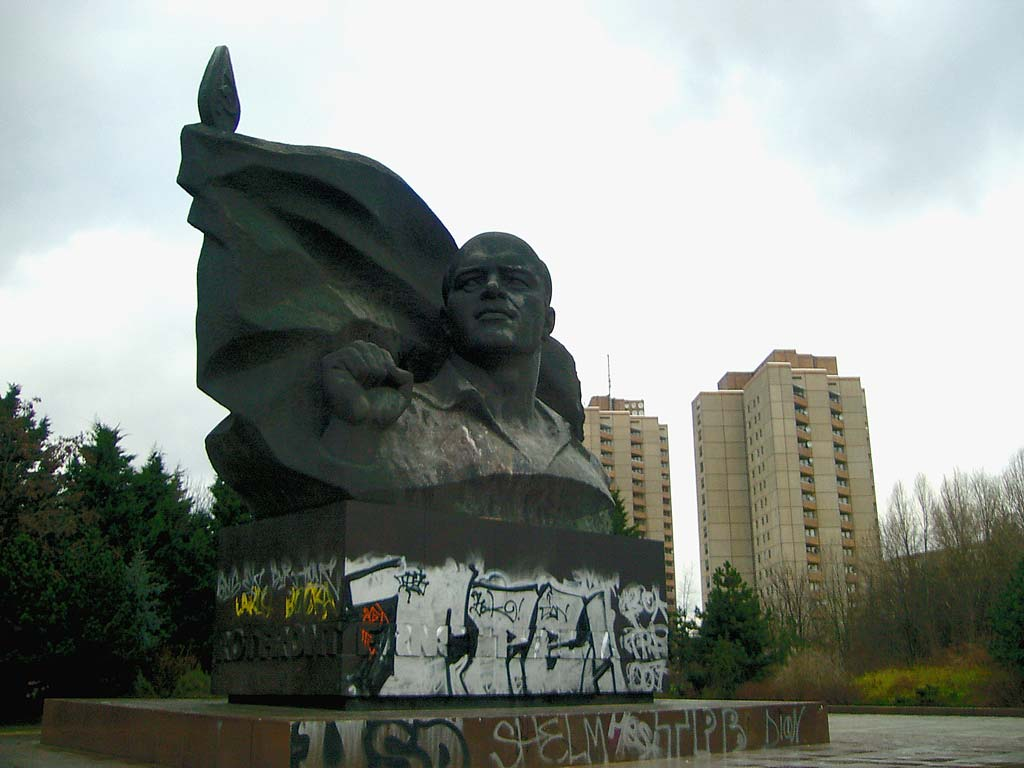
Ernst Thälmann monument with apartment buildings completed in 1987

Apart from the apartment buildings in the area around Ostseestraße built in the 1950s characterized by the architectural style of Socialist Classicism, the borough was mostly left alone by Socialist city planners until the 1980s when prestigious high rise buildings were built in Ernst-Thälmann-Park.

During German Reunification, the borough's residential areas were characterized by dilapidated grey facades that had not seen a coat of paint since the 1930s. In the 1990s the buildings that belonged to state-owned housing associations were sold to private investors, who had them renovated and raised the rents. Most of the borough's original inhabitants could not afford the increased costs and have since moved away. In the 21st century the many empty lots that were sites for the street culture integral to the bohemian character of the borough were filled by high-class condominiums.

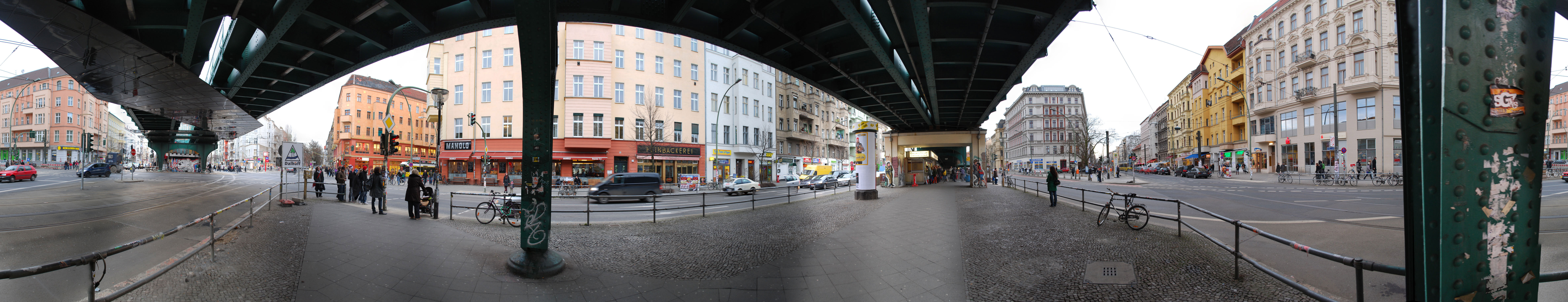
360°-Panorama of the intersection of Schönhauser Allee with Danziger and Eberswalder Straße. From left to right: junction of Eberswalder Straße, Schönhauser Allee toward the north (with elevated tram track), Pappelallee, junction of Danziger Straße, Schönhauser Allee toward the south, Kastanienallee

Prenzlauer Berg is an almost homogeneous historic building area in which much of the pre-war architecture has been preserved and where there are still many cobbled streets and ornate buildings from the beginning of the 20th century.

Over 300 buildings remain protected as historic monuments, like the municipal pool at Oderberger Straße and the breweries on Milastraße and Knaackstraße. The borough is famous for its restaurants and bars. Although places that provide a truly traditional Berlin staple are few and far between, there is a vast array of restaurants offering Arab, Turkish, Vietnamese, Tex-Mex, and Italian cuisine, especially around Kastanienallee, Kollwitzplatz, and Helmholtzplatz. The area around the intersections of Schönhauser Allee, Danziger Straße, Eberswalder Straße, Kastanienallee and Pappelallee has been associated with youth culture since the 1950s, and was immortalised in the DEFA film Ecke Schönhauser.

With regard to urban planning, the district affords a relatively uniform picture. It is predominantly characterized by five-story, multiple dwelling units in closed blocks. Thanks to the long property lots, the blocks, more often than not, are large and have abundant backyards, some having a perimeter of more than a kilometer.

Notable buildings include the large churches of the district, of which Gethsemane Church (designed by August Orth and built in 1891–1893) at Stargarder Straße is best known for its role in the peaceful revolution that brought down the Wall in 1989. Its 66-metre (217 ft) steeple is surpassed locally only by that of Segenskirche on Schönhauser Allee (79 metres (259 ft)) and of Immanuelkirche on Prenzlauer Allee (68 metres (223 ft)). School buildings planned by Ludwig Ernst Emil Hoffmann (1852–1932) also stand out in the area.

The Rykestrasse synagogue in the area remains the largest in Germany. Construction began at the end of 1903 and it was dedicated on 4 September 1904. During the Third Reich, the building escaped the antisemitic November pogrom in 1938, as it was closely surrounded by residential buildings. However, the synagogue was later desecrated and confiscated in April 1940. In July 1945, it reopened for services, underwent several renovations (1952/1953, 1976, 1987/1988), and on the occasion of its 100th anniversary was restored to its original splendor. In the Jewish Cemetery on Schönhauser Allee, opened in 1827, there are more than 22,500 graves and 750 family tombs, including the graves of David Friedländer, Max Liebermann, Leopold Ullstein, Ludwig Bamberger, Eduard Lasker, and Giacomo Meyerbeer.

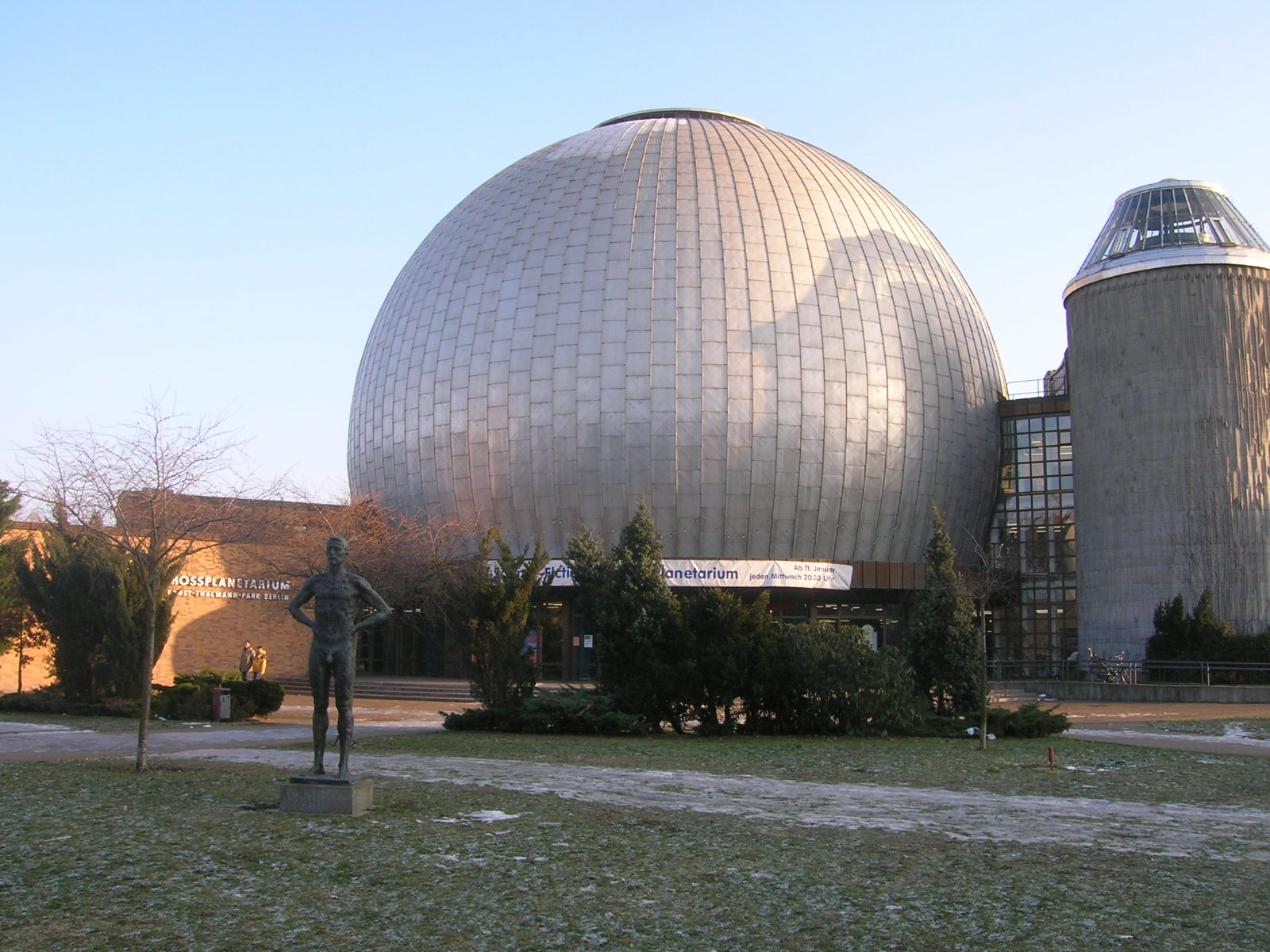
The Zeiss-Großplanetarium Berlin

A landmark in Prenzlauer Berg is the former water tower "Fat Hermann" at the corner of Rykestraße and Knaackstraße near Kollwitzplatz. Built in 1877, it is the first water tower in Berlin. Historic buildings like the water tower, or the Prater Beer Garden in Kastanienallee, as well as the former brewery at Schönhauser Allee and Sredzkystraße still give an impression of the days when Prenzlauer Berg was part of the so-called Steinernes Berlin (Berlin of stone) as described by author Werner Hegemann in 1930. Another notable building is the Zeiss Major Planetarium on Prenzlauer Allee, opened in 1987.

In the west, bordering the borough of Wedding and adjacent to Friedrich Ludwig Jahn Sportpark, is a stretch of public green area called Mauerpark (Wall park). It consists of the former border zone, or "death strip" between both walls that separated East and West Berlin. Before the war, the terrain was a site of a freight station. After reunification, the area was turned into a public park which hosts a week market and open air concerts. It attracts thousands of visitors on summer weekends.

== History ==
Prenzlauer Berg was developed during the second half of the 19th century based on 1862 urban planning designs by James Hobrecht, the so-called Hobrecht-Plan for Berlin. Prenzlauer Berg was part of what became known as the Wilhelmine Ring with a primarily working-class population. Before the Second World War around 11% of Prenzlauer Berg's population were Jewish. In Nazi Germany (1933–1945), landmark buildings such as the water tower at Rykestraße and the office buildings at Froebelstraße were used as makeshift concentration camps and torture chambers.

During the war years the city population decreased as many inhabitants were evacuated to the countryside to escape aerial bombardment. When the city was divided by the ally, Prenzlauer Berg became part of the Soviet Sector and from 1947 onward part of the capital of the German Democratic Republic. From the 1960s onward, the borough's tenement houses (in German: Mietskasernen) were home to intellectuals, artists, students, and East Germany's gay community.

=== Prenzlauer Berg at the time of the German reunification ===
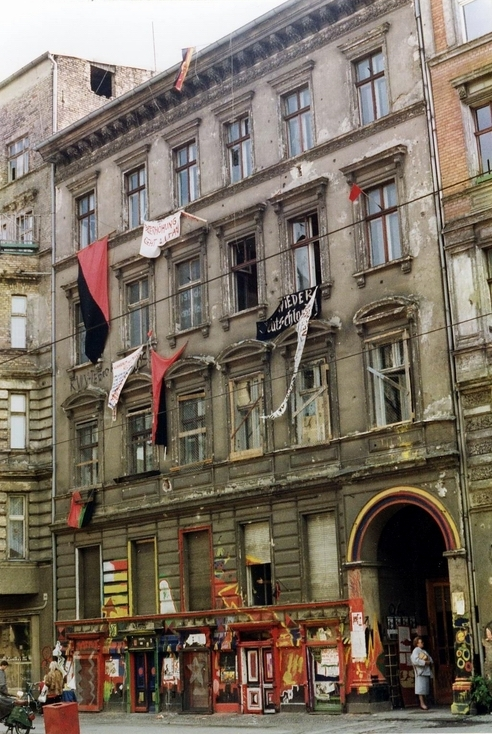
Music chapel "Squat"

In the interim between the peaceful revolution that brought down the wall in 1989 and the consolidation of a united Germany that began a year later, as many as 39 Wilhelmine apartment houses were occupied by squatters in Prenzlauer Berg alone. Focal points were the areas around Kastanienallee, Teutoburger Platz, and Helmholtzplatz (locally known as "LSD-Borough" for the initials of its three main thoroughfares Lychener- Schliemann- and Dunckerstraße). The first ones to move in were young grassroots activists from Prenzlauer Berg in search of radical democratic alternatives to the state-socialism of the GDR. They were soon joined by young anarchists from West-Berlin and other parts of Germany who set up collective projects ranging from bicycle workshops to community soup kitchens. Some of it contributed to the cultural life of the borough as they were venues for concerts, poetry slams, and underground movie screenings. They frequently came under attack by neonazi skinheads. While many music chapels were cleared out by the police by 1998, some inhabitants entered into contracts with the city and were able to stay on.

Most of Prenzlauer Berg's urban apartment blocks had belonged to the state-owned housing associations of the GDR. After reunification, they were placed into a privatization scheme and were bought up by private investors who renovated the buildings and raised the rents. Many original residents were unable to afford the higher living expenses and were gradually replaced by more affluent newcomers.

Edith Udhardt (1929–2024) established places for senior citizens and created centres for homeless people, and devoted herself to the concerns of women in the district. She was a founding member of the Prenzlauer Berg women's advisory board in 1992, which merged into the Pankow women's advisory board in 2001. In 1990, was elected to the Prenzlauer Berg District Council for the first time, and in the 1995 Berlin state election, she was elected to the House of Representatives.

=== Prenzlauer Berg since the 1990s ===
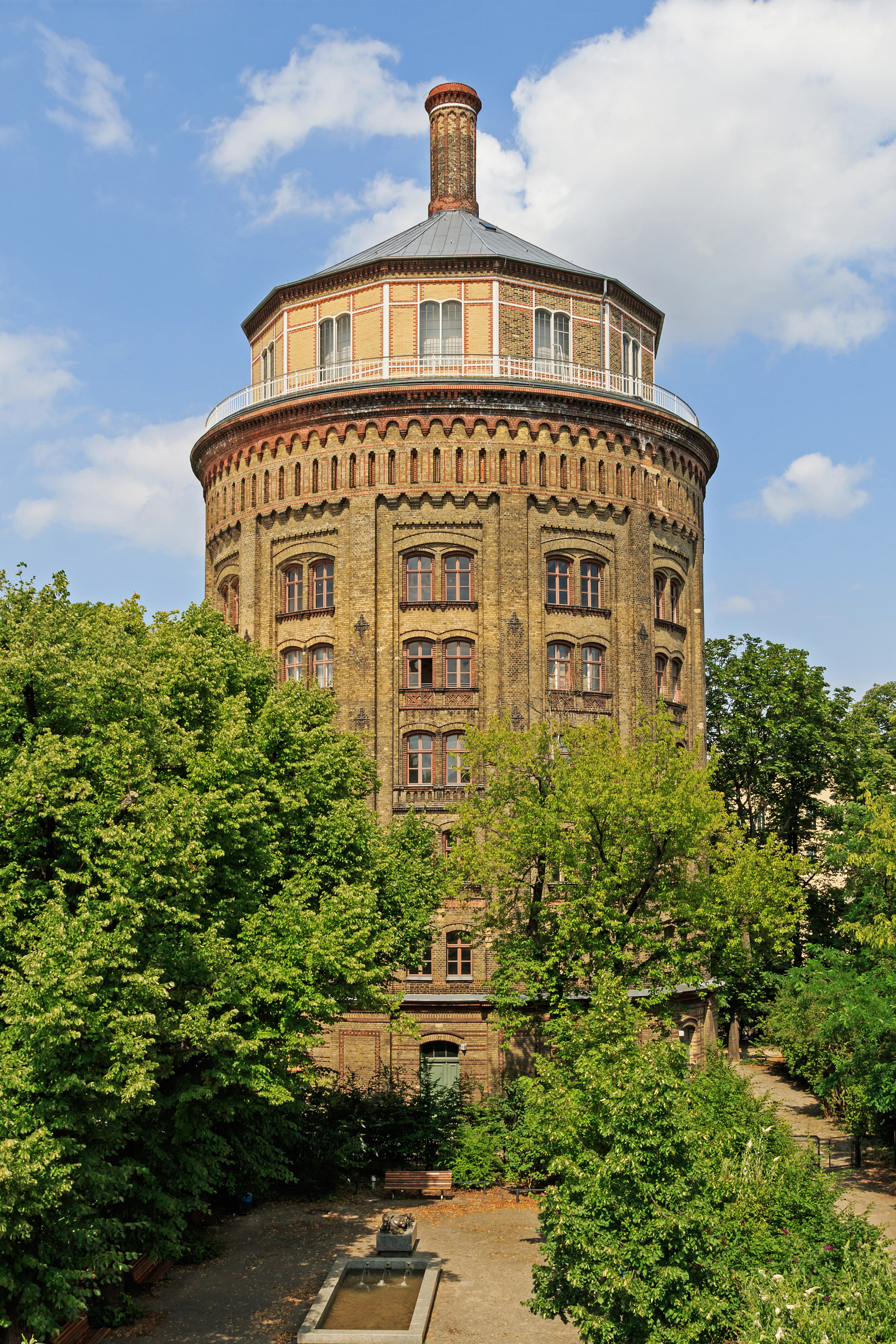
Water tower "Fat Hermann" at Rykestraße

After the fall of the Berlin Wall, Prenzlauer Berg initially developed into a trendy district with numerous cafés, bars and clubs, especially in the streets around Kollwitzplatz and Helmholtzplatz, due to numerous vacant commercial spaces in the early 1990s. However, these early underground bars and clubs disappeared already in the mid-1990s with the increasing redevelopment and gentrification of the district. Apart from a few commercial discotheques in the Kulturbrauerei, there are no more clubs in Prenzlauer Berg since the 2010s. After the turn of the millennium, Prenzlauer Berg was soon regarded by many as the "spearhead of Berlin's gentrification" and as the "bourgeois area of the new Berlin".

Along with Friedrichshain, Neukölln, and Kreuzberg the district was a popular neighborhood with the student population; however, since the late 1990s, the gentrification that paralleled the borough's rise in popularity resulted in an exodus of students to cheaper neighborhoods. In 2007, German journalist Henning Sußebach coined the term Bionade-Biedermeier, a neologism combining the name of a popular organic softdrink with the Biedermeier era (1815–1848) to describe the sociocultural situation of Prenzlauer Berg. The term is equivalent to e.g. LOHAS and Bobo (Bohémiens bourgeois). Since the late 1990s Prenzlauer Berg has become popular for more affluent people from Southern Germany who have bought condominiums here. Many areas of Prenzlauer Berg have become trendy shopping areas with streetstyle fashion designers selling their wares in its boutiques.

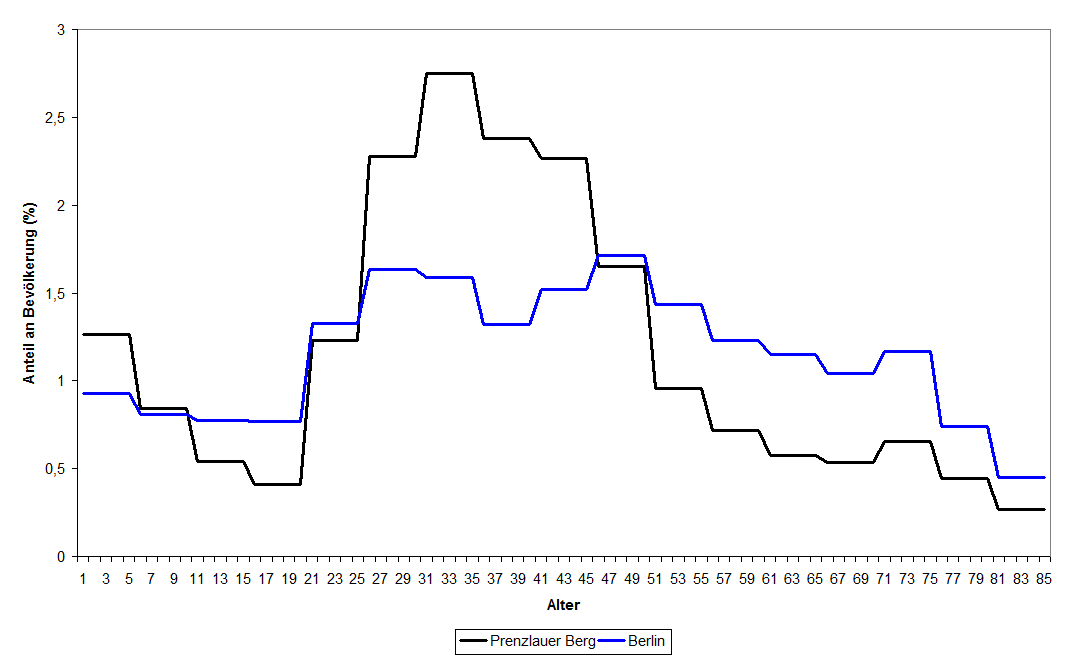
Age structure (2011) of Berlin (blue) and Prenzlauer Berg (black)

Prenzlauer Berg is also one of the few places in Germany that have experienced a baby boom since the mid-1990s. This is due to the above-average presence of people between 20 and 40 rather than a higher birthrate than elsewhere in the country. The borough has adapted to the trend by offering an abundance of playgrounds, daycare centers, as well as (second-hand) shops and cafes catering to the needs of young children and their parents.

Over the years, many artists chose Prenzlauer Berg as their residence: painter and sculptor Käthe Kollwitz, early film maker Max Skladanowsky, poets Adolf Endler, Annemarie Bostroem, and Heinz Kahlau, theater director Christoph Schlingensief, writers Jurek Becker, Bruno Apitz, Peter Hacks, Herbert Nachbar, Dieter Noll, Klaus Schlesinger, Klaus Kordon, Uwe Kolbe, Paul Alfred Kleinert, Florian Illies, Wladimir Kaminer, and Detlef Opitz, sculptor Olaf Nicolai, painters Cornelia Schleime, Elke Pollack, and Konrad Knebel, photographers Thomas Florschuetz, Helga Paris, and Nicolaus Schmidt, film director Tom Tykwer, keyboardist Jörn-Uwe Fahrenkrog-Petersen, playwright René Pollesch, musicians Gerhard Schöne, Christian Lillinger, Nina Hagen, Dirk von Lowtzow (Tocotronic), and Till Lindemann, (Rammstein), actors Fredy Sieg, Eva-Maria Hagen, Heike Makatsch, Katharina Wackernagel, David Bennent, Daniel Brühl, August Diehl, Kurt Krömer, and Matthias Schweighöfer, comic-strip artist Flix, as well as TV and radio presenters Hans Rosenthal, Alfred Biolek, Sarah Kuttner, Sandra Maischberger, and Benjamin Tewaag.

== Points of interest ==
- Gethsemane Church, former meeting place of the resistance in the GDR
- The area around Helmholtzplatz and along Kastanienallee for restaurants and bars
- Kollwitzplatz on market days
- The Jewish cemetery on Schönhauser Allee, where painter Max Liebermann and composer Giacomo Meyerbeer are buried
- The Kulturbrauerei, cultural center housed in an historic brewery
- Mauerpark (flea market every Sunday, open air concerts during summer months)
- Rykestrasse Synagogue
- Wasserturm Prenzlauer Berg (water tower), designed by Henry Gill, constructed by the English Waterworks Company and finished in 1877.
- Tuntenhaus, founded in 1990, a queer housing collective hosting community events and resisting gentrification. Located at Kastanienallee 86.

== Notable people ==
- Kurt Demmler (1943–2009), songwriter accused of sexual abuse who hanged himself in his jail cell.
- Benno Fürmann (born 1972), actor
- Klaas Heufer-Umlauf (born 1983), journalist
- Heinz Kapelle (1913–1941), communist
- Ernst Knaack, (1914–1944), resistance fighter
- Christian Lorenz (born 1966), musician and keyboard player for band Rammstein
- Heike Makatsch (born 1971), actress
- Käthe Niederkirchner (1909–1944), resistance fighter
- Wilhelm Rietze (1903–1944), resistance fighter
- Hans Rosenthal (1925–1987), radio editor, director, radio and television host in the 1970s and 1980s
- Gustav Scholz (1930–2000), boxer
- Cornelia Schleime (born 1953), painter, performer, filmmaker and author
- Arthur Sodtke (1901–1944), resistance fighter
- Ernst Thälmann (1886–1944), communist politician
- Edith Udhardt (1929–2024), nurse, social activist, politician
- Agnes Wendland (1891–1946), Righteous Among the Nations
