= 1995 Berlin state election =

State election in Berlin, Germany

- 22 October 1995

All 206 seats of the Abgeordnetenhaus of Berlin 104 seats needed for a majority
- Turnout: 1,669,186 (68.6%) ▼12.2%
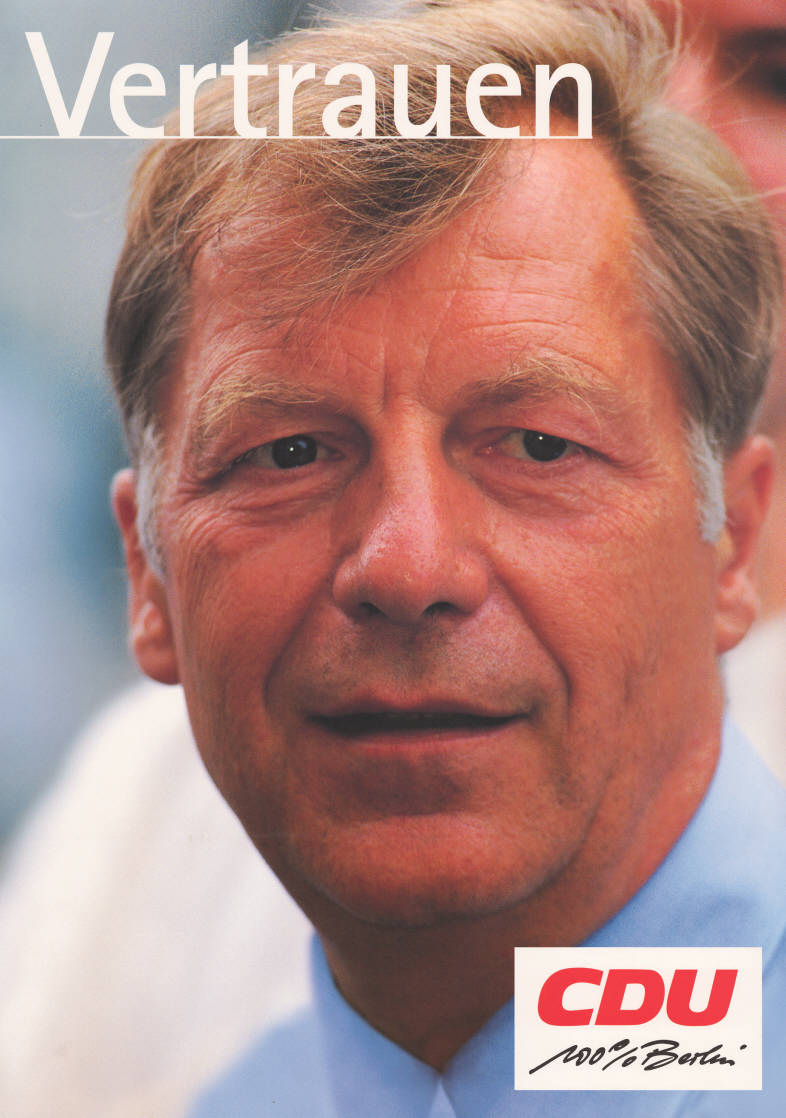
	First party	Second party
Leader	Eberhard Diepgen	Ingrid Stahmer
Party	CDU	SPD
Last election	101 seats, 40.4%	76 seats, 30.4%
Seats won	87	55
Seat change	▼14	▼21
Popular vote	625,005	393,245
Percentage	37.4%	23.6%
Swing	▼3.0%	▼6.8%
	Third party	Fourth party
Party	PDS	Greens
Last election	23 seats, 9.2%	23 seats, 9.4% (Note: Results for the Alternative List (5.0%) and Alliance 90 (4.4%).)
Seats won	34	30
Seat change	▲11	▲7
Popular vote	244,196	219,990
Percentage	14.6%	13.2%
Swing	▲5.4%	▲3.8%
- Results for single-member constituencies.
Mayor before election
Eberhard Diepgen
CDU
Elected Mayor
Eberhard Diepgen
CDU

The 1995 Berlin state election was held on 22 October 1995 to elect the members of the 13th Abgeordnetenhaus of Berlin. The incumbent grand coalition between the Christian Democratic Union (CDU) and Social Democratic Party (SPD) retained government. CDU leader Eberhard Diepgen was re-elected as Mayor.

== Parties ==
The table below lists parties represented in the 12th Abgeordnetenhaus of Berlin.

Name		Ideology	Leader(s)	1990 result	
Name		Ideology	Leader(s)	Votes (%)	Seats
CDU	Christian Democratic Union of Germany; Christlich Demokratische Union Deutschlands	Christian democracy	Eberhard Diepgen	40.4%	101 / 241
SPD	Social Democratic Party of Germany; Sozialdemokratische Partei Deutschlands	Social democracy	Ingrid Stahmer	30.4%	76 / 241
Grüne	Alliance 90/The Greens; Bündnis 90/Die Grünen	Green politics		9.4% (Note: Results for the Alternative List (5.0%) and Alliance 90 (4.4%).)	23 / 241
PDS	Party of Democratic Socialism; Partei des Demokratischen Sozialismus	Democratic socialism		9.2%	23 / 241
FDP	Free Democratic Party; Freie Demokratische Partei	Classical liberalism		7.1%	18 / 241

== Election result ==
Summary of the 22 October 1995 election results for the Abgeordnetenhaus of Berlin
Party	Votes	%	+/–	Seats	+/–
Christian Democratic Union (CDU)	625,005	37.44	-3.0	87	-14
Social Democratic Party (SPD)	393,245	23.56	-6.8	55	-21
Party of Democratic Socialism (PDS)	244,196	14.63	+5.4	34	+11
Alliance 90/The Greens (Grüne)	219,990	13.18	+3.8	30	+7
The Republicans (REP)	45,462	2.72	-0.4	0	±0
Free Democratic Party (FDP)	42,391	2.54	-4.6	0	-18
The Grays – Gray Panthers (Graue)	28,356	1.70	New	0	New
Others	70,541	4.23		0	±0
Total	1,669,186	100.00	–	206	–

Popular Vote
CDU	37.44%
SPD	23.56%
PDS	14.63%
B'90/GRÜNE	13.18%
FDP	2.54%
Other	8.65%

Abgeordnetenhaus seats
CDU	42.23%
SPD	26.70%
PDS	16.50%
B'90/GRÜNE	14.56%

	SPD	CDU/CSU	PDS	Grüne	FDP	REP	Others
West Berlin	25.5	45.4	2.1	15.0	3.4	2.6	6
East Berlin	20.2	23.6	36.3	10.0	1.1	2.9	5.9

== People ==
People elected include:

- Edith Udhardt (1929–2024) – PDS
