= Wasserturm Prenzlauer Berg =

Water tower in Berlin, Germany

Coordinates: 52.53419°N 13.41856°E

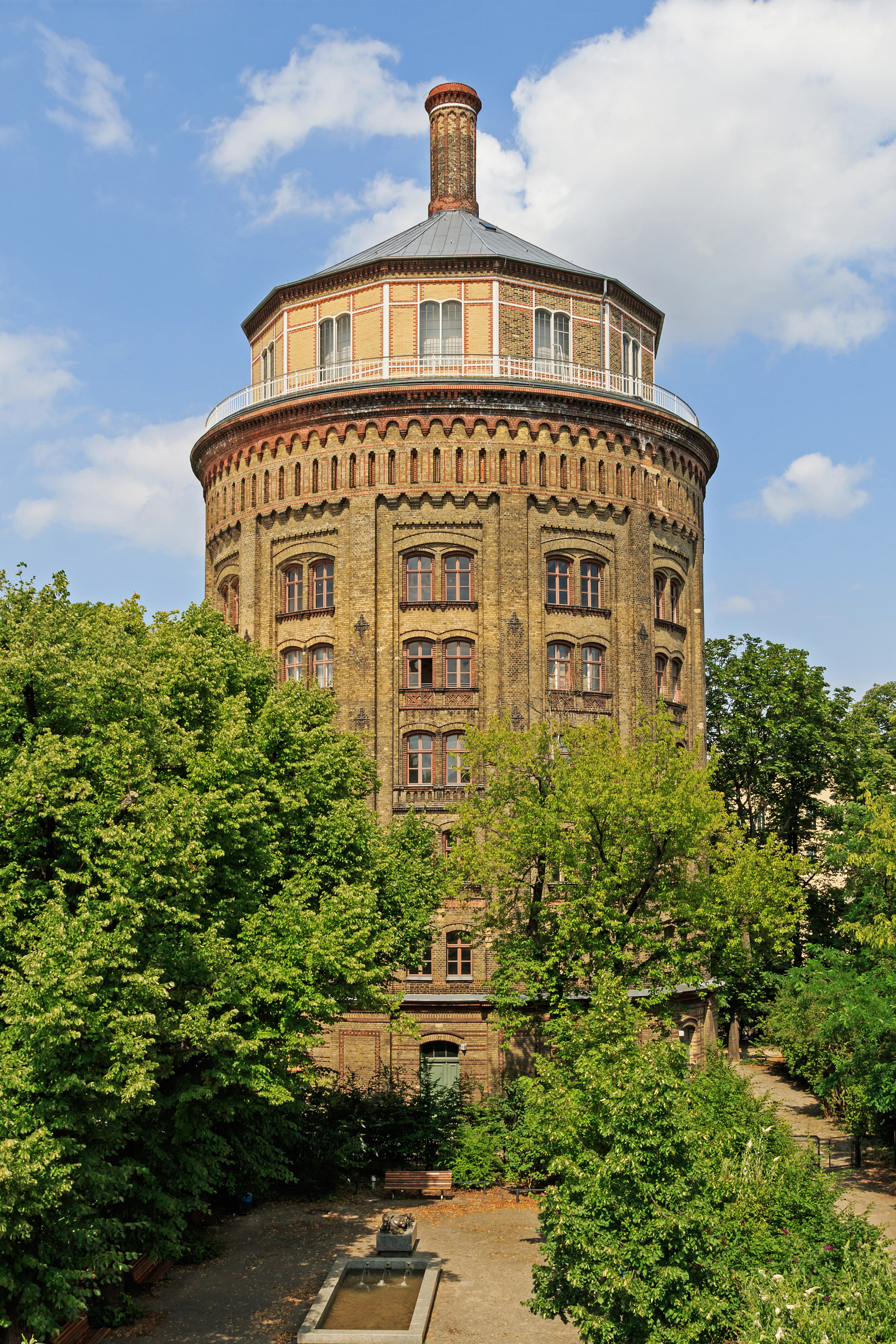
The Wasserturm Prenzlauer Berg

The Wasserturm Prenzlauer Berg is Berlin's oldest water tower, completed in 1877 and in use until 1952. The tower is locally known as "Fat Hermann" (Dicker Hermann). The structure was designed by Henry Gill and built by the English Waterworks Company. It is situated between Knaackstraße and Belforter Straße in Kollwitzkiez, in the Prenzlauer Berg locality of Berlin (part of Pankow district) and worked on the principle of using piped water to supply the rapidly growing population of workers.

== Overview ==
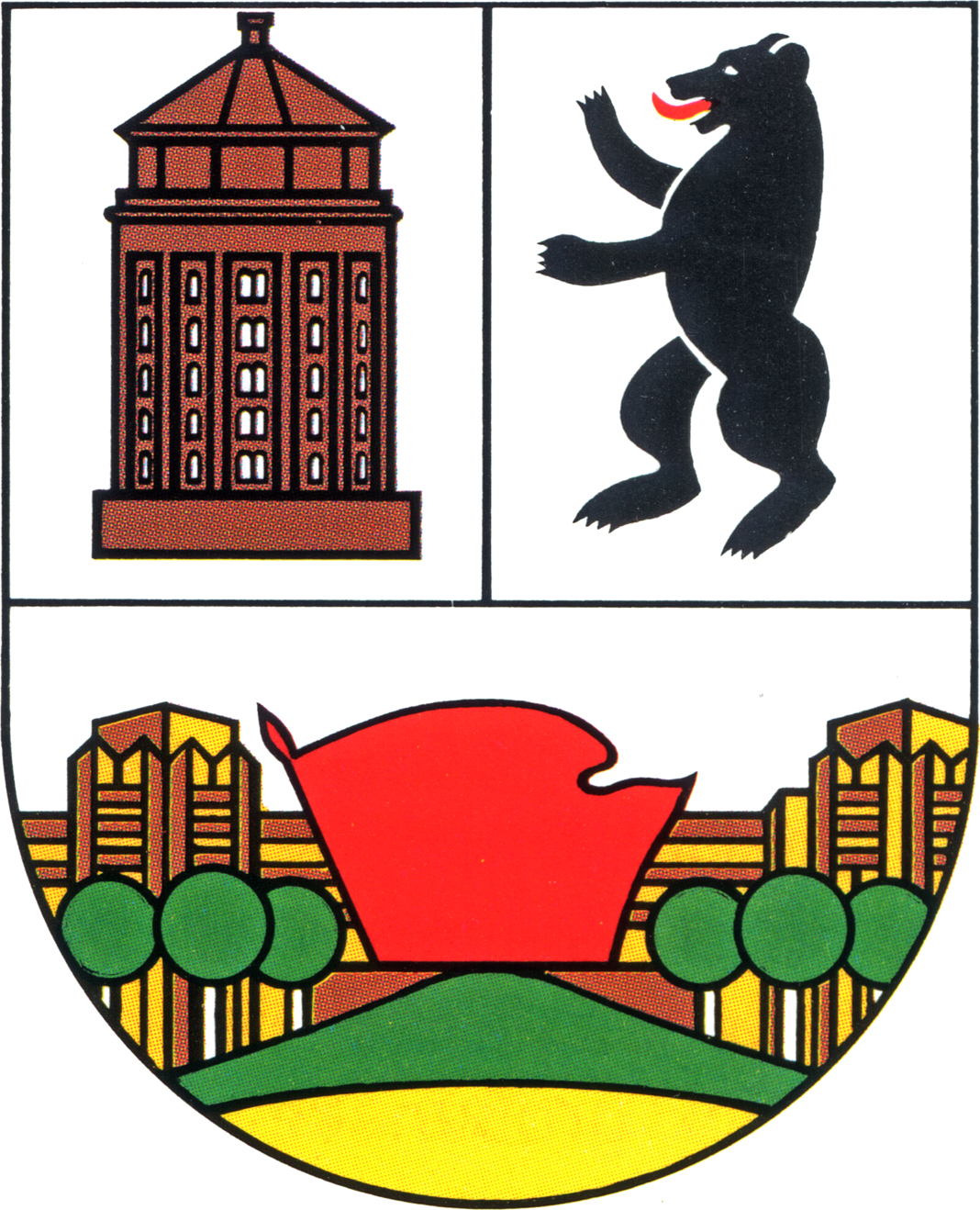
The coat of arms of the Prenzlauer Berg district in 1987

Below the storage tank were the homes of the machinery operators who worked in the tower; these apartments - a landmark of Prenzlauer Berg - are still inhabited and in much demand. As a landmark, the tower was a part of two district coat of arms from 1920 to 1987 and 1987 to 1992.

=== Concentration Camp ===
After the National Socialists' "seizure of power", the SA's Maschinenhaus I, which belonged to the water tower, served as a "wild concentration camp" in spring 1933, in which Communists, Socialists, Jews and other persons unwelcome to the new rulers were interned and murdered without a court ruling. A memorial wall on the grounds of the water tower has commemorated these crimes since 1981. From June 1933, the concentration camp (KL) was converted into the "SA-Heim Wasserturm". Engine House I, built in 1877 and measuring around 1000 m², served the SA members as a dining and recreation room, while Engine House II served as a dormitory. In the autumn of 1934, the SA-Heim was demolished in 1935, and work began on converting the grounds into a public park. In the course of this measure, Maschinenhaus I was demolished in June 1935. The green area was inaugurated on 1 May 1937 and has since been converted to a playground on the site of the Maschinenhaus I.
