= Schönhauser Allee =

Thoroughfare in Berlin, Germany

Coordinates: 52°32′27″N 13°24′43″E

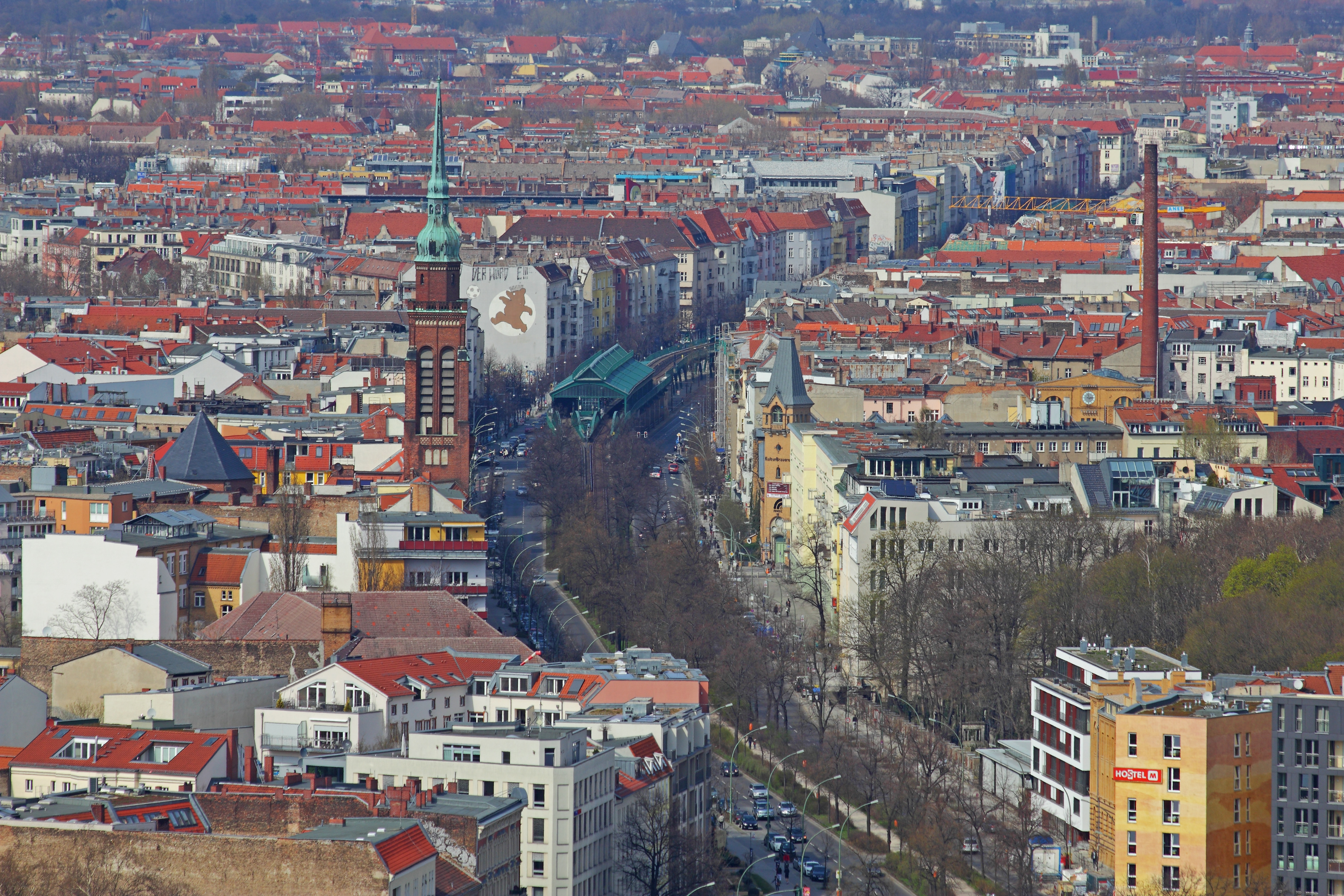
Schönhauser Allee from Park Inn Berlin.

Schönhauser Allee in Berlin is a major thoroughfare in the Prenzlauer Berg district.

Schönhauser Allee begins at Rosa-Luxemburg-Platz in the south and ends at Schonensche Straße in the north. Many of the side streets of Schönhauser Allee are named after Scandinavian cities as Bornholmer Straße and Kopenhagener Straße. The street was named after the Schönhausen Palace in Pankow.

Schönhauser Allee Map

The Berlin U-Bahn line U2 follows the boulevard on an elevated railway.
