= List of restaurant districts and streets =

This is a list of restaurant districts and streets. Restaurant districts and streets are sometimes referred to as "restaurant row".

== Restaurant districts and streets ==
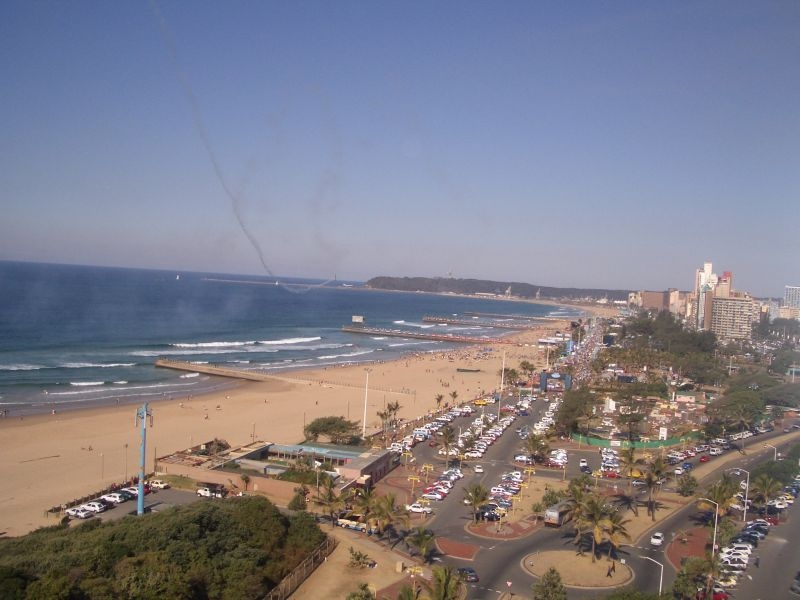
A view of the Golden Mile, from the Snake Park to Harbour Mouth, Durban, KwaZulu-Natal, South Africa

- Andra långgatan
- Barrio Bellavista
- Barrio Chino (Buenos Aires)
- Barrio Chino (Lima)
- Barrio Lastarria
- Chinatown, Kolkata
- Courtenay Place, Wellington
- Gali Paranthe Wali
- Jimbaran
- Moses Mabhida Stadium
- Nokdu Street
- Paseo Tablado La Guancha
- Rue de Berne
- Rue Gouraud
- Rue Princesse
- Skadarlija
- Tangra, Kolkata
- Trastevere
- Van Wesenbekestraat
- Žižkov

=== Australia ===
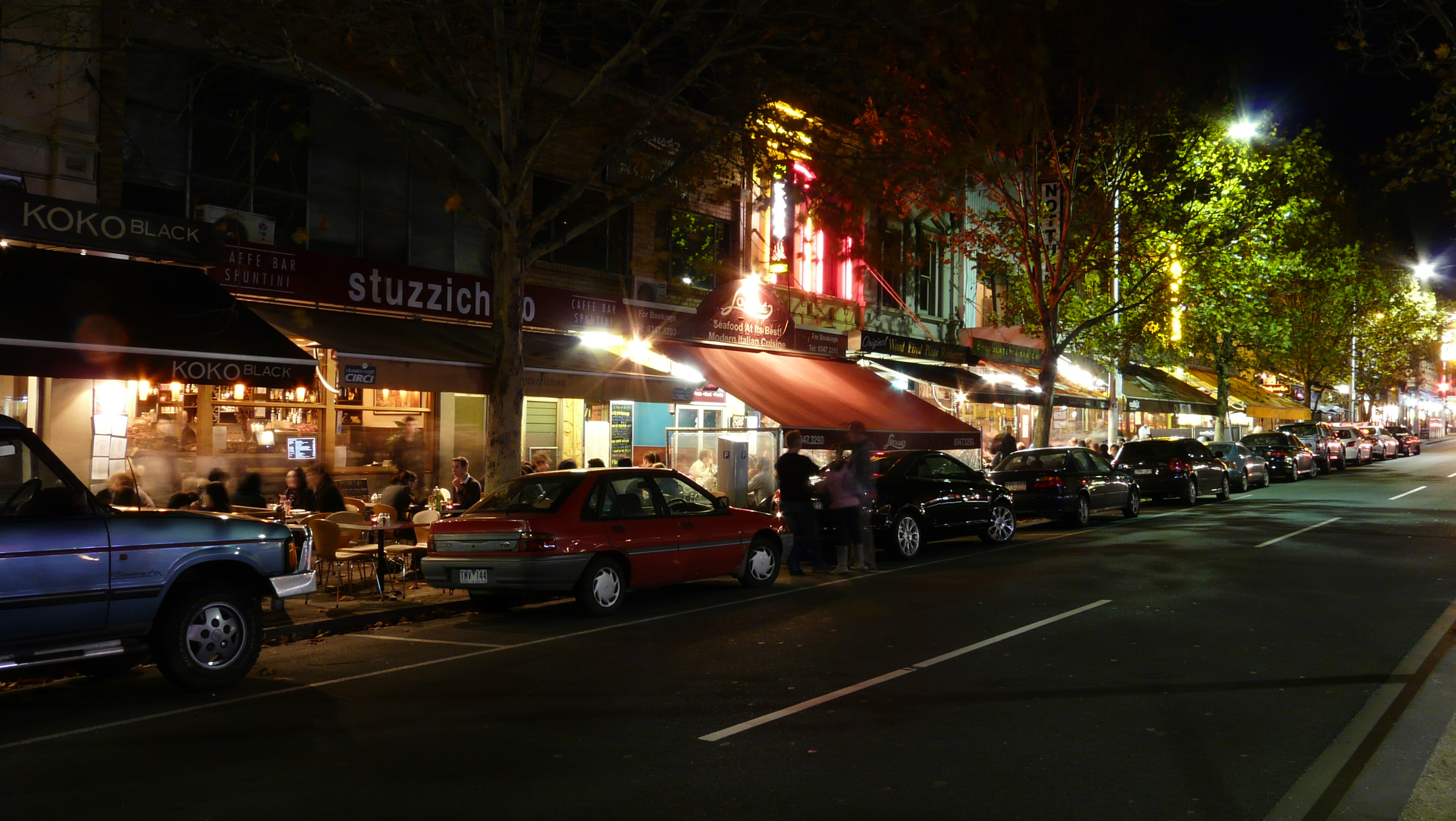
Italian restaurants on Lygon Street, Little Italy, Melbourne

- Acland Street, Melbourne
- Albany Highway, Victoria Park, Western Australia
- Brunswick Street, Brisbane
- Carlton, Victoria
- Caxton Street, Brisbane
- Chinatown, Adelaide
- Chinatown, Sydney
- Elizabeth Street, Hobart
- Gouger Street, Adelaide
- Kings Cross, Sydney
- Little Italy, Melbourne
- Lygon Street, Carlton
- Northbridge, Western Australia
- Norton Street, Leichhardt
- Racecourse Road, Brisbane
- South Terrace, Fremantle
- Stanley Street, East Sydney

=== Bangladesh ===
- Nazirabazar

=== Brazil ===
- Lapa, Rio de Janeiro
- Rua Farme de Amoedo
- Vila Madalena

=== Canada ===
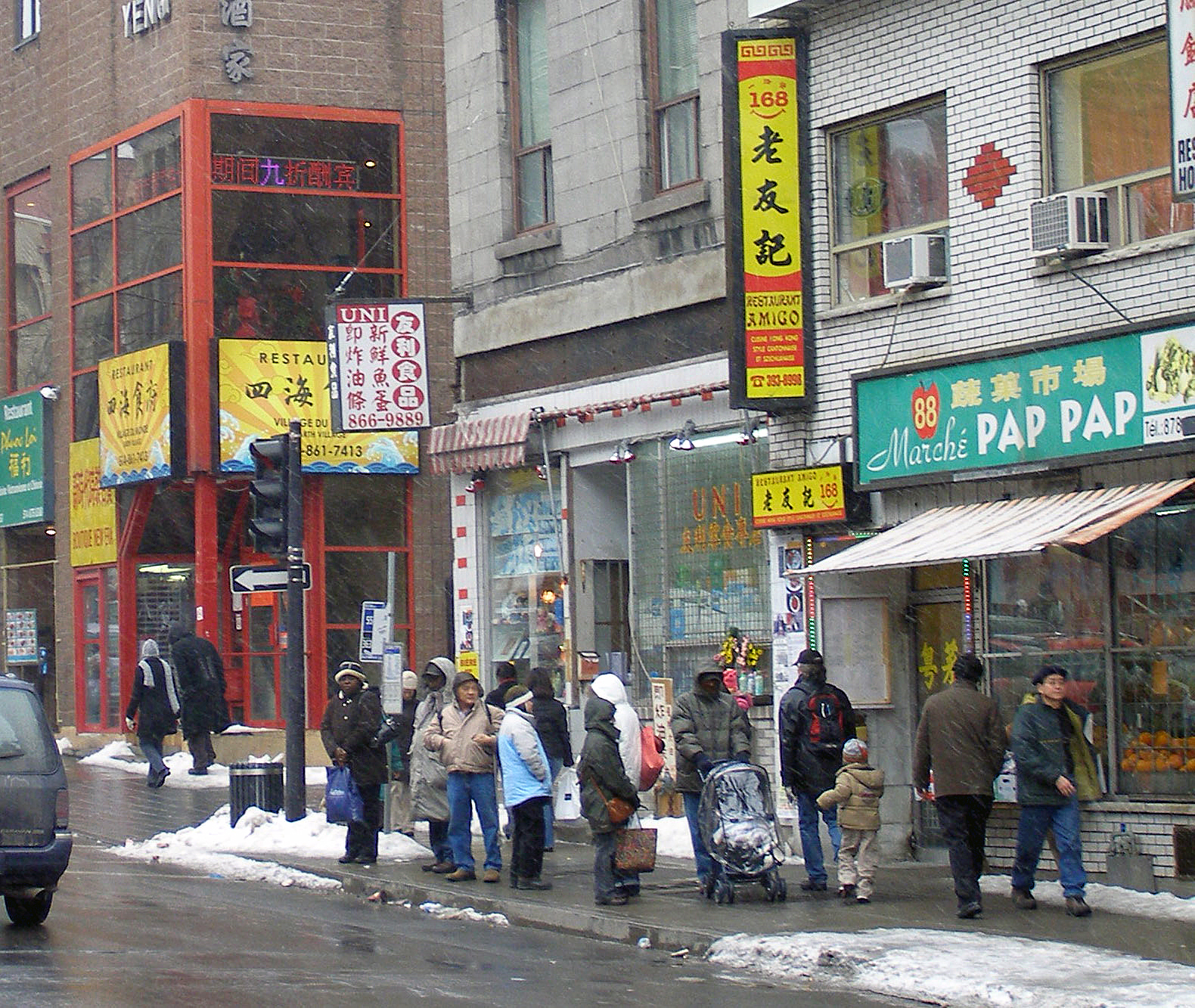
A street scene at Chinatown, Montreal, 2005

- Chinatown, Ottawa
- Chinatown, Toronto
- Côte-des-Neiges Road
- Côte-Saint-Luc Road
- Crescent Street
- Distillery District
- George Street, St. John's
- Greektown, Toronto
- Le Quartier Chinois
- La Petite-Italie
- Little Italy, Toronto
- Little Italy, Vancouver
- Pizza Corner (Halifax)
- Saint Denis Street

=== China ===
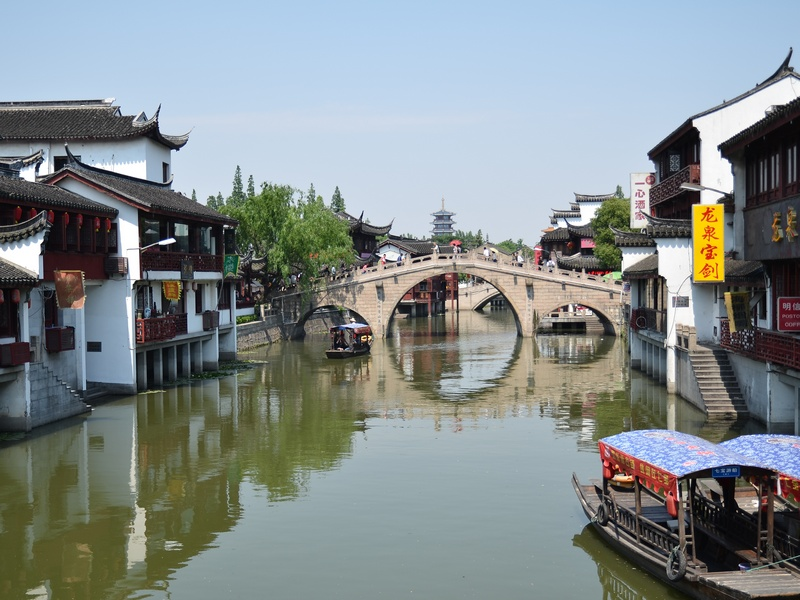
A view of Qibao Old Street, including Puhui River Bridge

- Hengshan Road, Shanghai
- Qibao Old Town, Shanghai
- Rua do Cunha, Macao

==== Hong Kong ====
- Cochrane Street
- Kimberley Street
- Knutsford Terrace
- Lan Kwai Fong
- Soho, Hong Kong
- Starstreet Precinct
Hong Kong restaurant districts

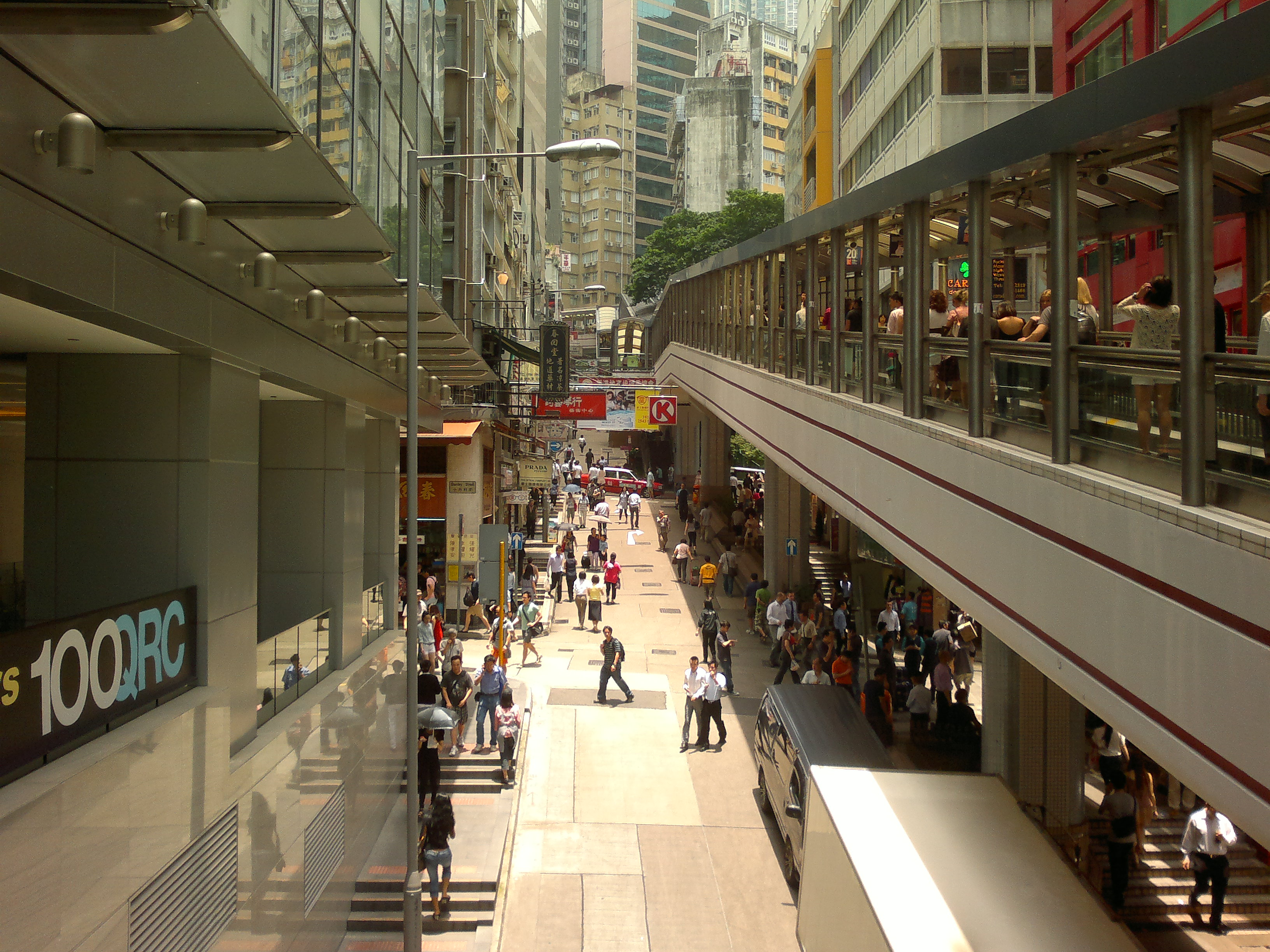
A view of Cochrane Street in Hong Kong

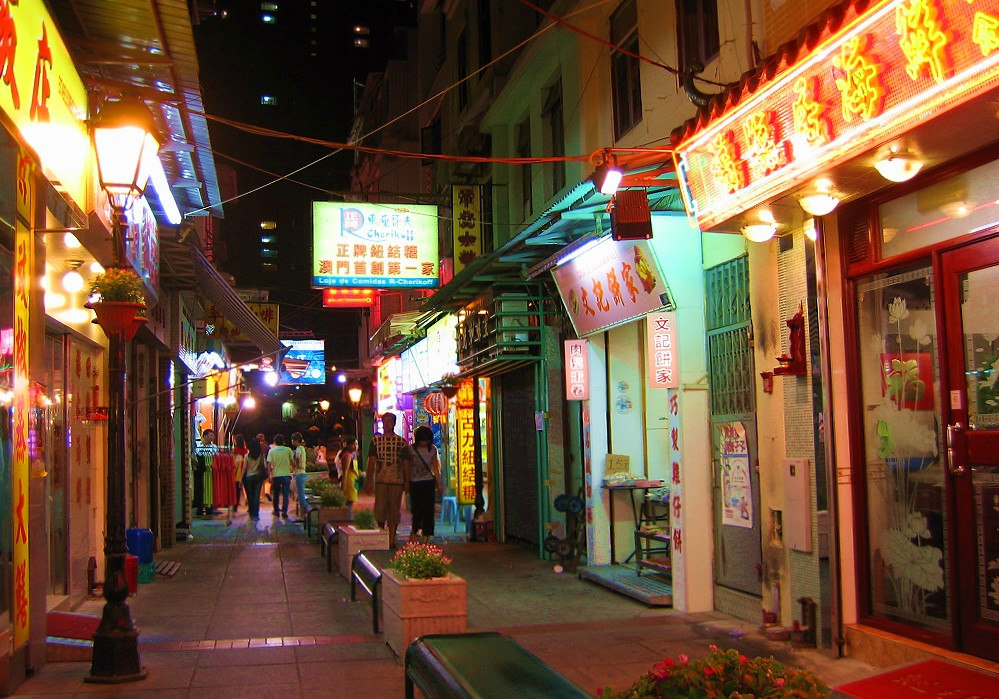
A view of Rua do Cunha, China, at night

=== Denmark ===
- Jomfru Ane Gade
- Nyhavn

=== France ===
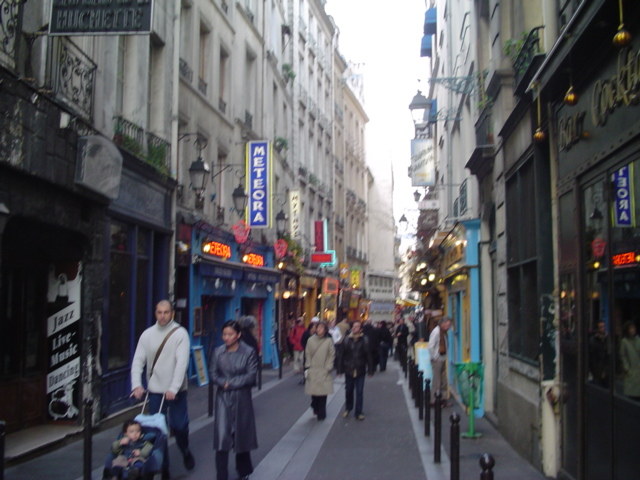
A small street in Paris' Latin Quarter, with bistros and restaurants

- The Latin Quarter in Paris, including Rue de la Huchette, Rue Saint-Séverin, and the Montagne Sainte-Geneviève
- Rue Montorgueil, Paris
- Rue Mercière, Lyon
- Rue des Marronniers, Lyon
- The Vieux Lyon (Old Town) district of Lyon
- Le Suquet, Cannes
- The Vieux Tours (Old Town) district of Tours
- Le Vaugueux, Caen

=== Germany ===
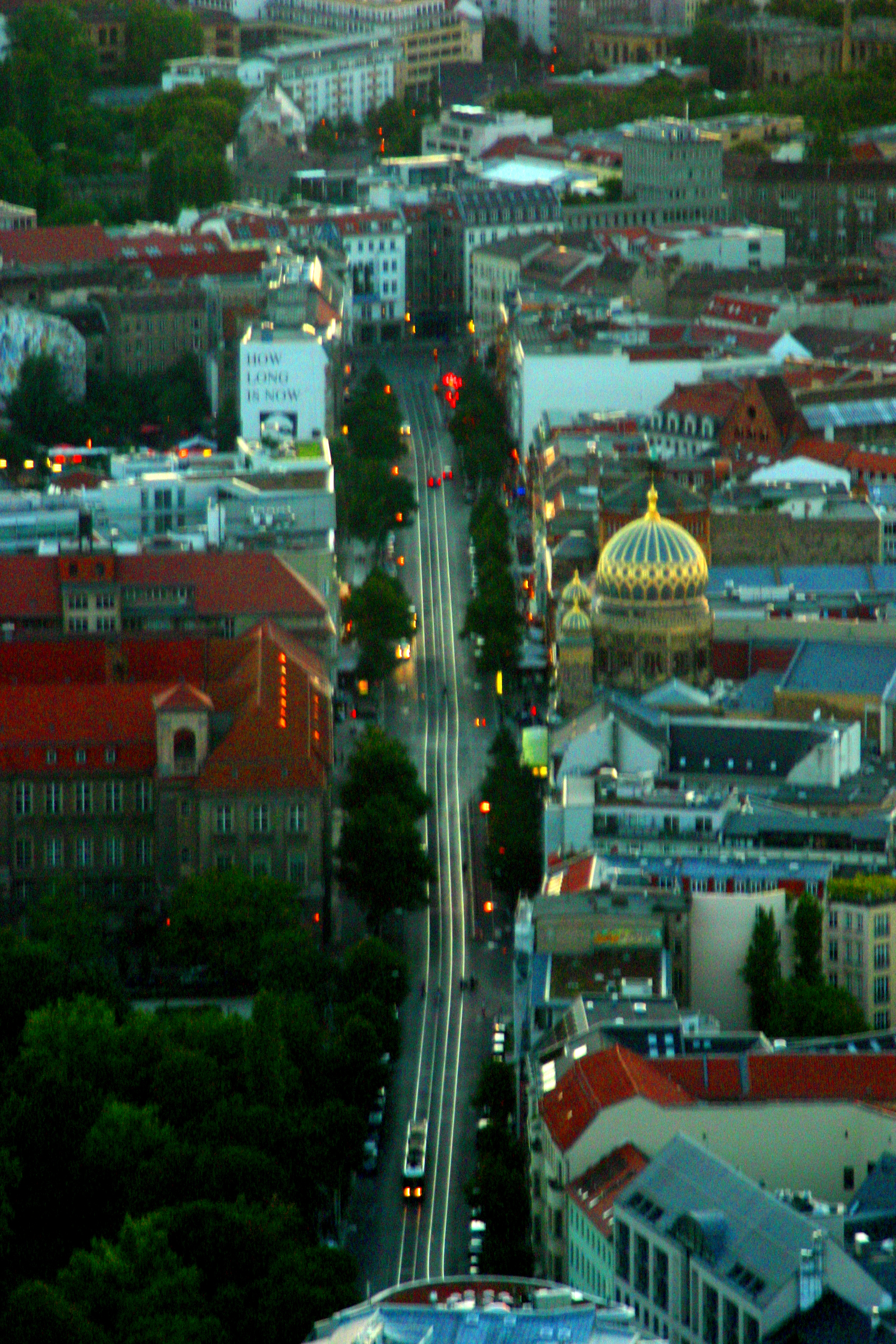
An aerial view of Oranienburger Straße in central Berlin, Germany, taken from the Fernsehturm

- Altstadt (Düsseldorf)
- Berlin:
  - Kopenhagener Straße
  - Nikolaiviertel
  - Oranienburger Straße
- Bermudadreieck, Bochum
- Duisburg Inner Harbour
- Freßgass, Frankfurt
- St. Pauli, Hamburg

=== India ===
- Chappan Dukan, Indore
- VV Puram Food Street, Bangalore
- Zakaria Street, Kolkata

=== Japan ===
- Kobe Chinatown
- Nakasu (Edo)
- Okonomi-mura
- Shinjuku Golden Gai
- Yokohama Chinatown

=== Mexico ===
- Chinatown, Mexicali
- Chinatown, Mexico City
- Colonia Roma
- Condesa
- Mesa de Otay

=== Pakistan ===
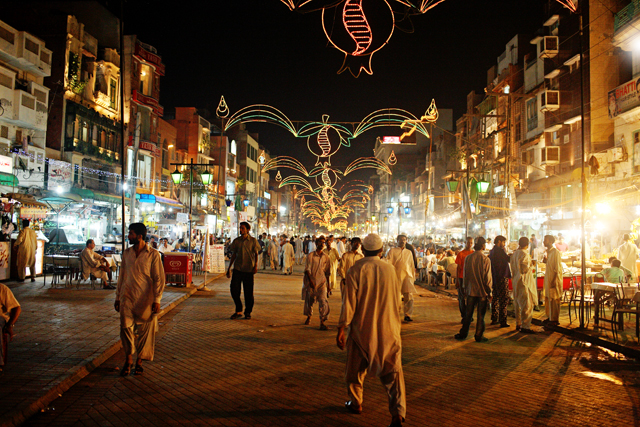
The Anarkali food street in Lahore, Pakistan

- Anarkali Bazaar Food Street, Lahore
- Boat Basin, Karachi
- Burns Road, Karachi
- Do Darya Food street, Karachi
- Fort Road Food Street, Lahore
- Gawalmandi Food Street, Lahore
- Gizri
- M. M. Alam Road, Lahore
- Port Grand Food and Entertainment Complex, Karachi
- Qissa Khawani Bazaar Food Street, Peshawar

=== Singapore ===
- Boat Quay
- Club Street
- Holland Village, Singapore
Singapore restaurant districts

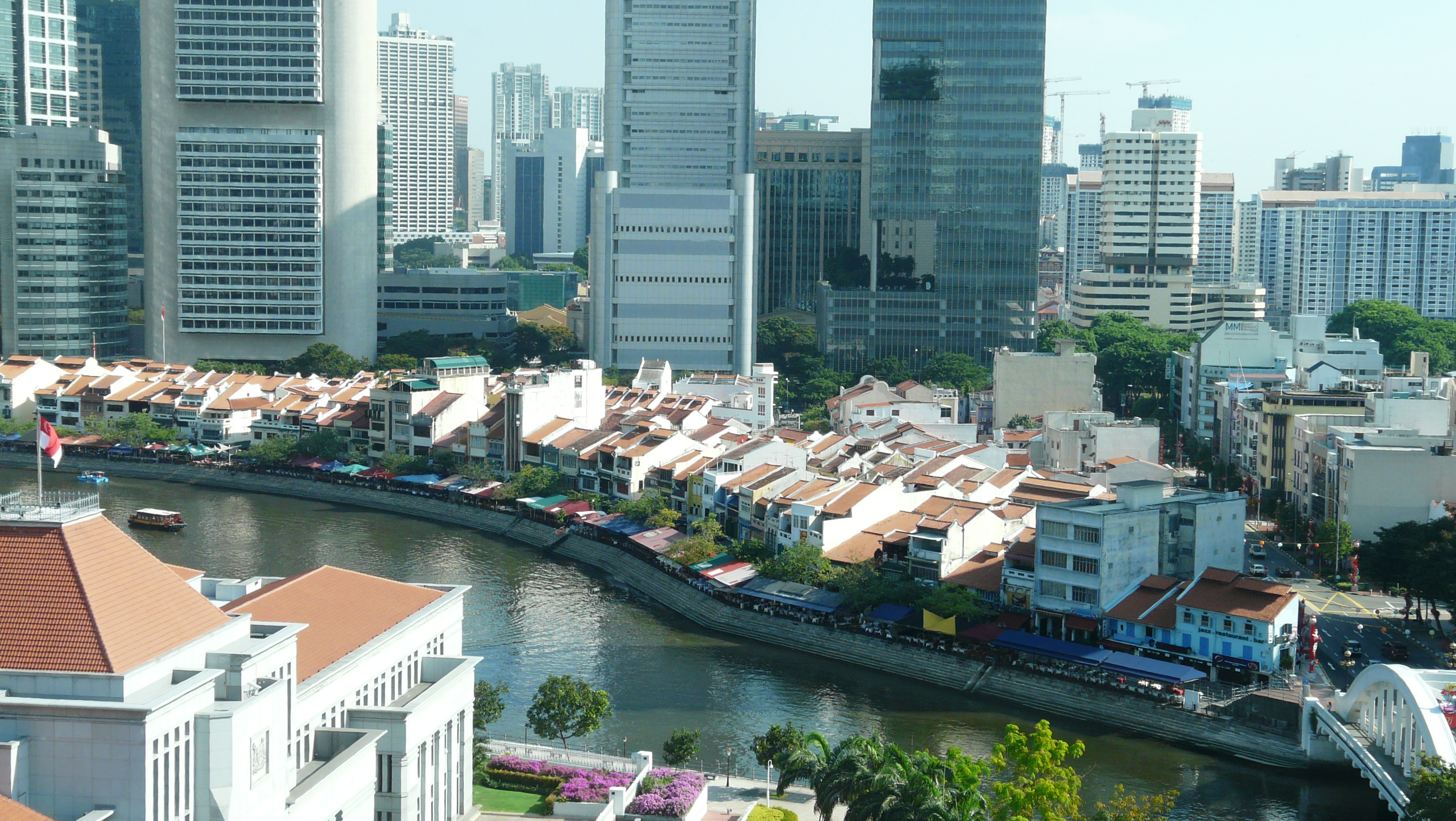
An aerial view of Boat Quay, Port of Singapore, Singapore

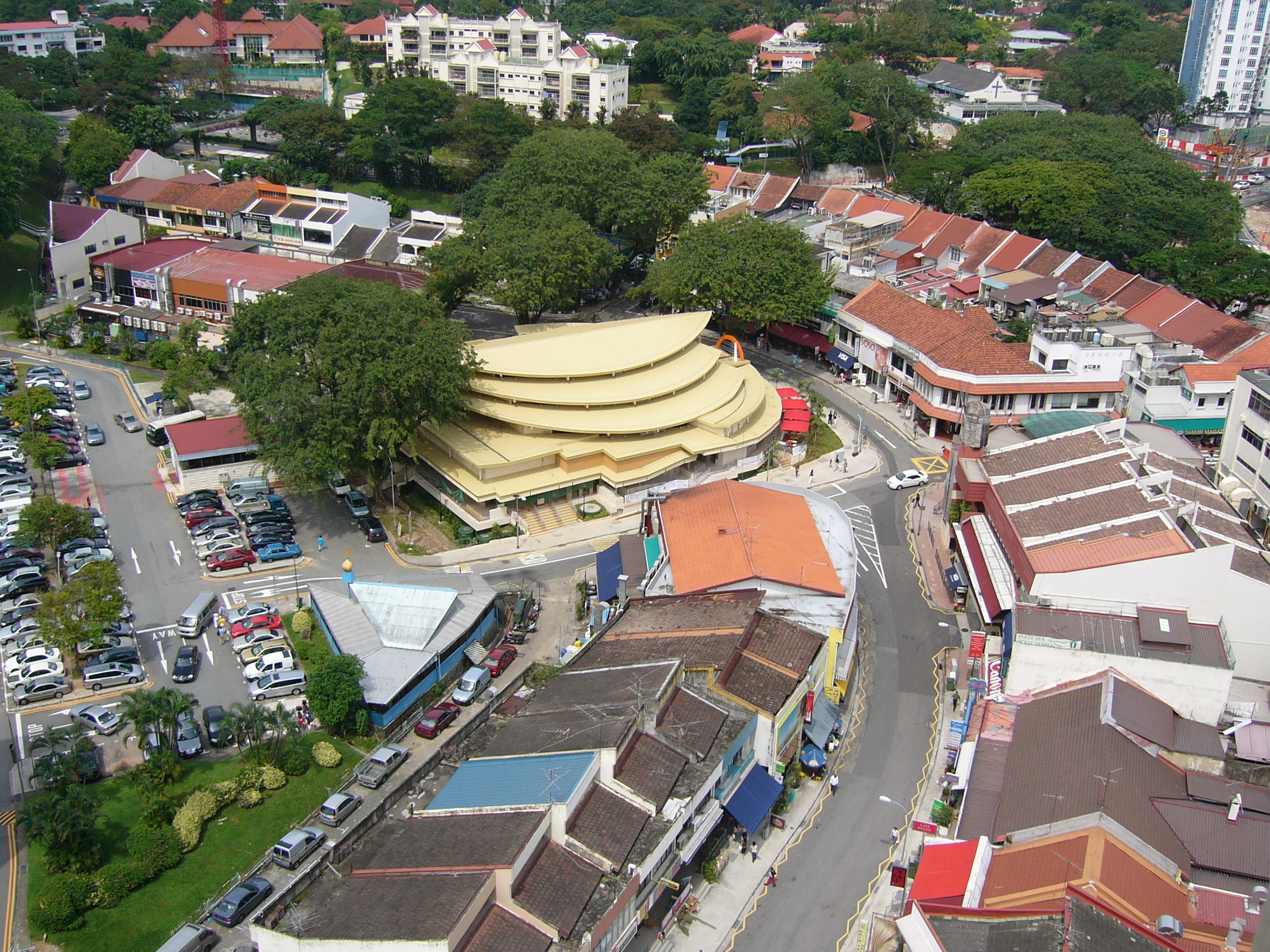
An aerial view of Holland Village, Singapore

=== Saudi Arabia ===
- Saudi Arabian cuisine
- Arab cuisine

=== South Africa ===
- 7th Street (Johannesburg)
- Golden Mile, Durban
- Long Street (Cape Town)

=== Spain ===
- Albayzín
- Barrio Húmedo
- El Raval

=== Taiwan ===
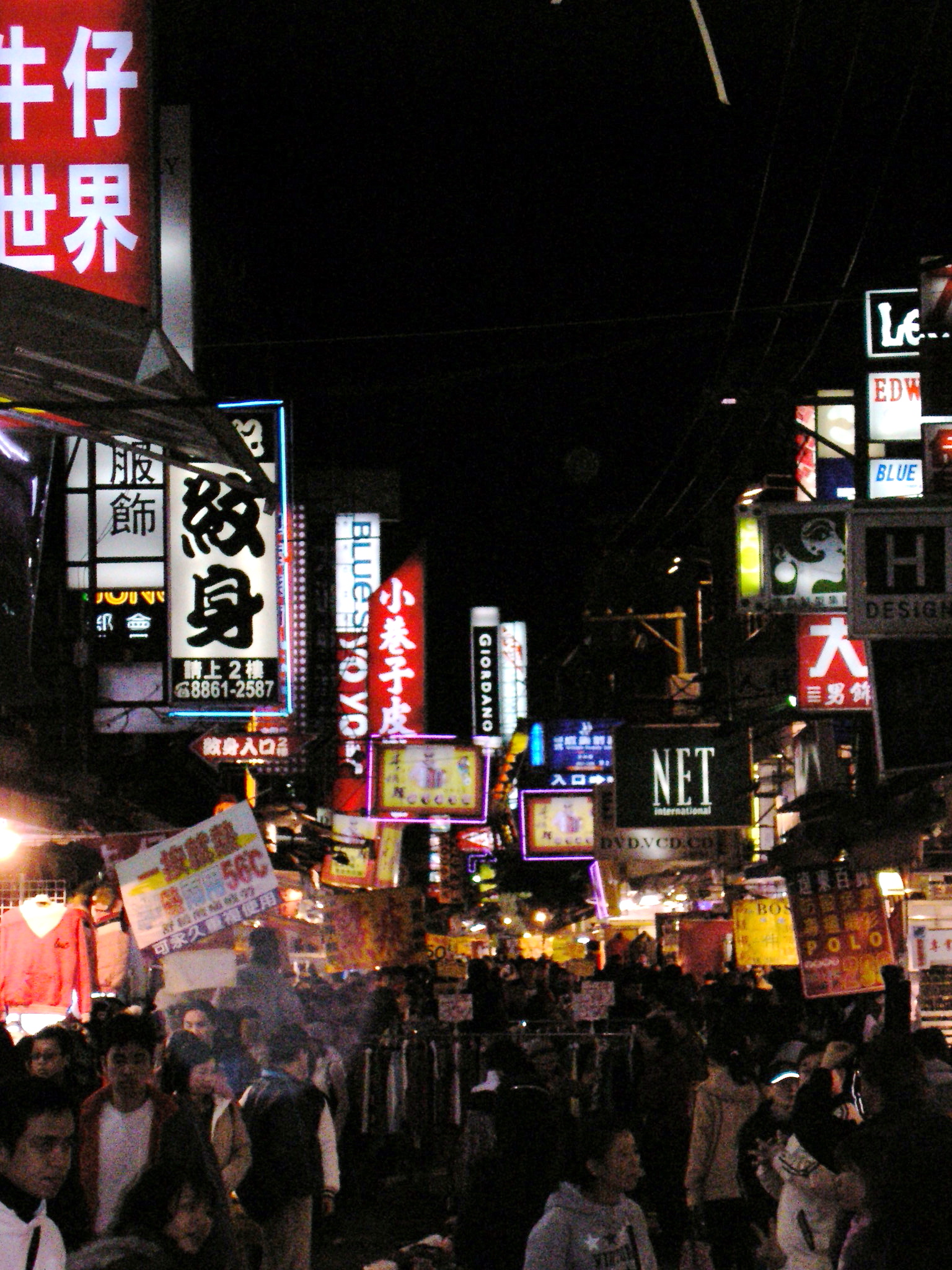
Shilin Night Market in the Shilin District of Taipei, Taiwan, is a popular nighttime destination.

- Shilin Night Market
- Snake Alley (Taipei)

=== Turkey ===
- Bağdat Avenue
- Beyoğlu
- Bostancı
- İstiklal Avenue
- İstinye
- Kumkapı
- Ortaköy
- Polonezköy
Turkey restaurant districts

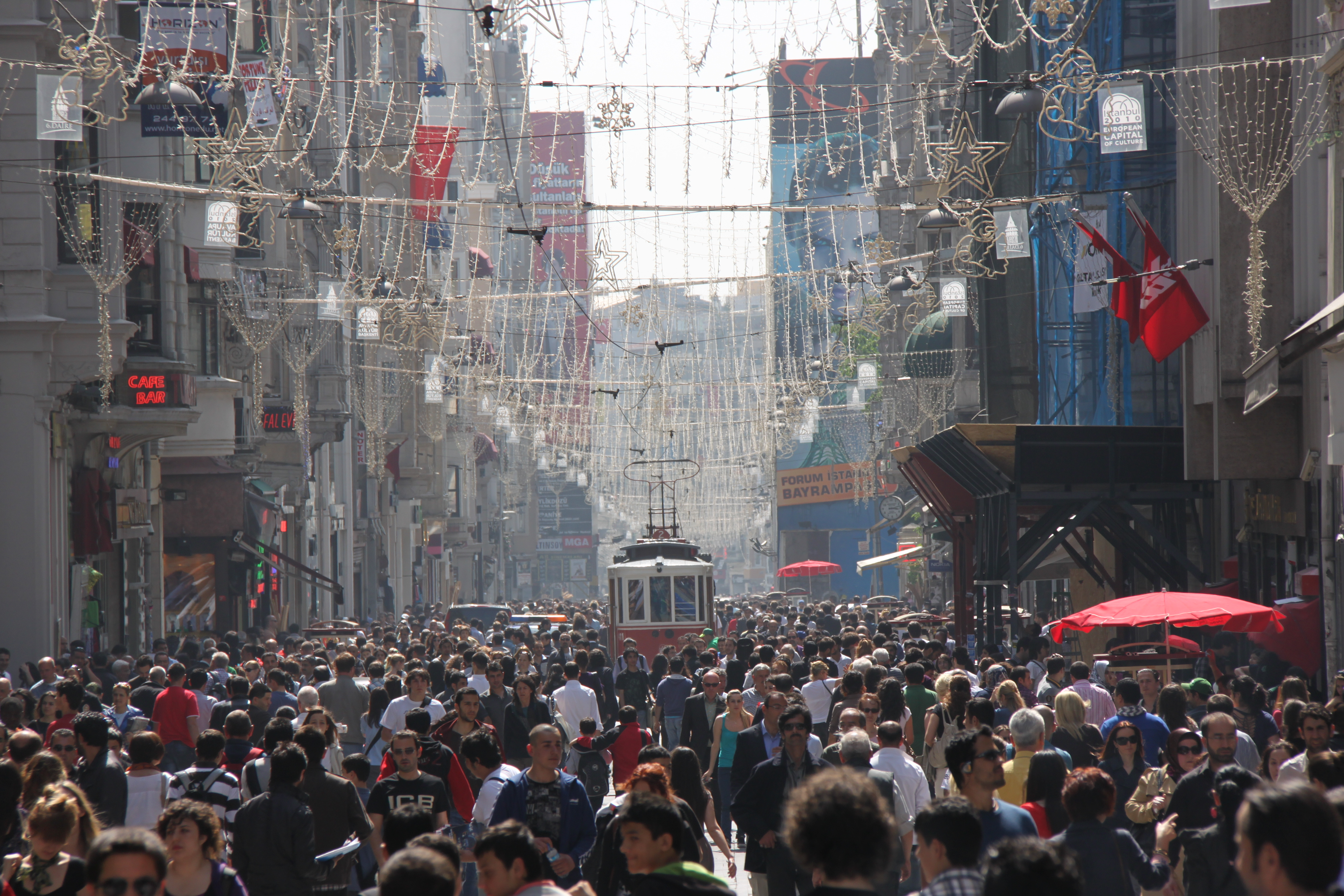
İstiklal Avenue in Beyoğlu, Istanbul, Turkey

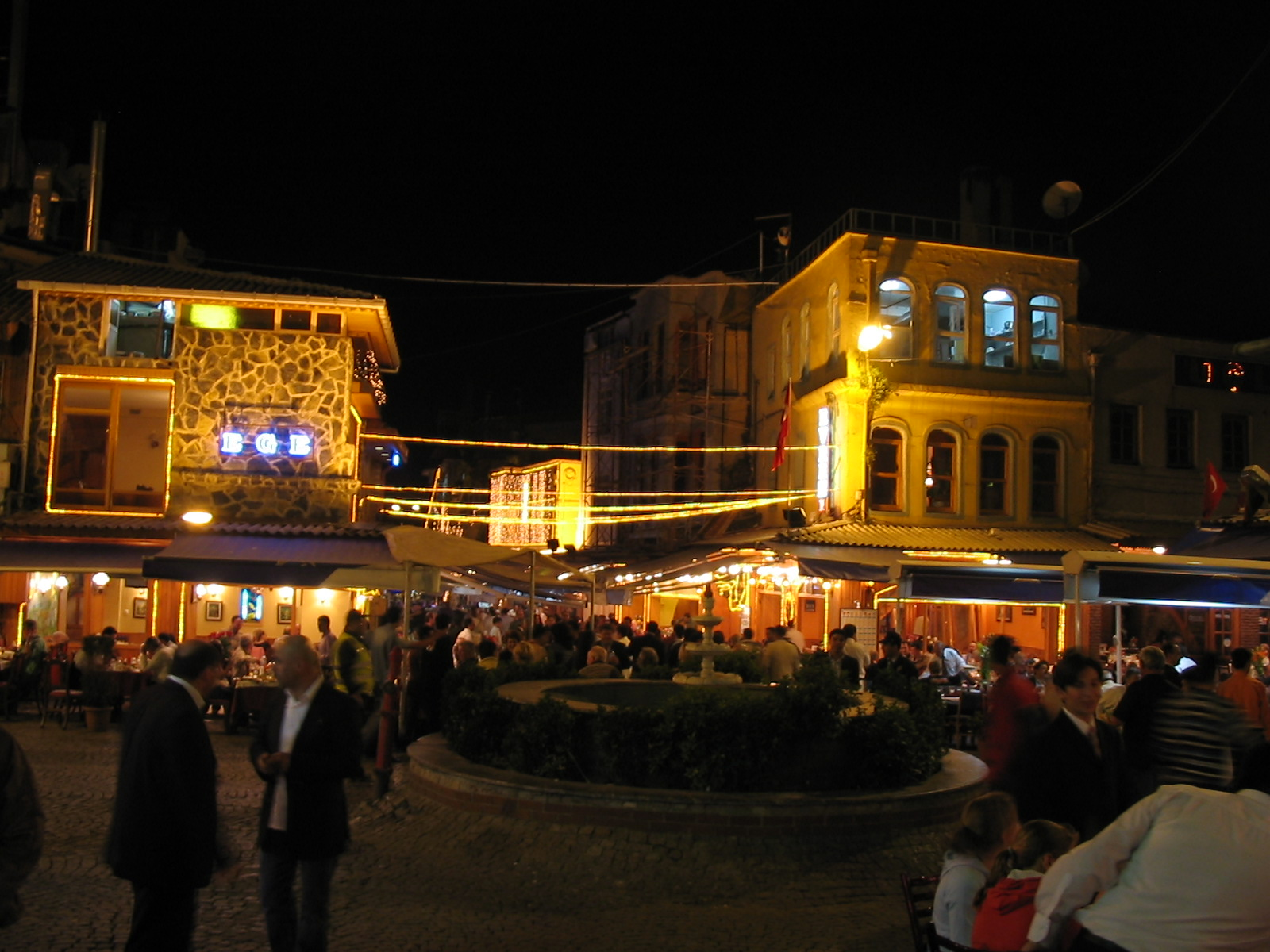
Seafood restaurants in Kumkapı at night

=== United Kingdom ===
- Golden Mile (Belfast)

==== England ====
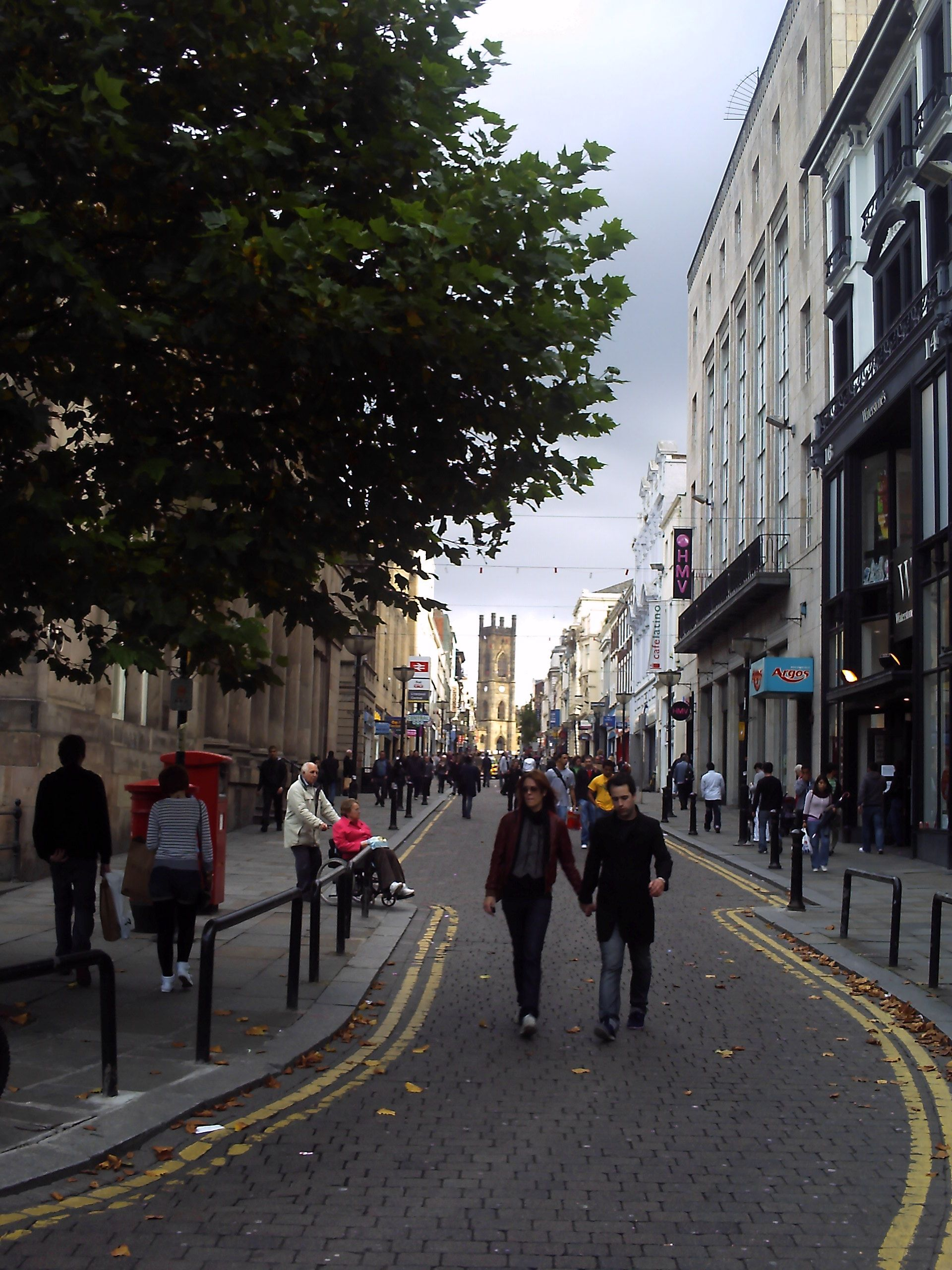
The bottom of Bold Street, Liverpool

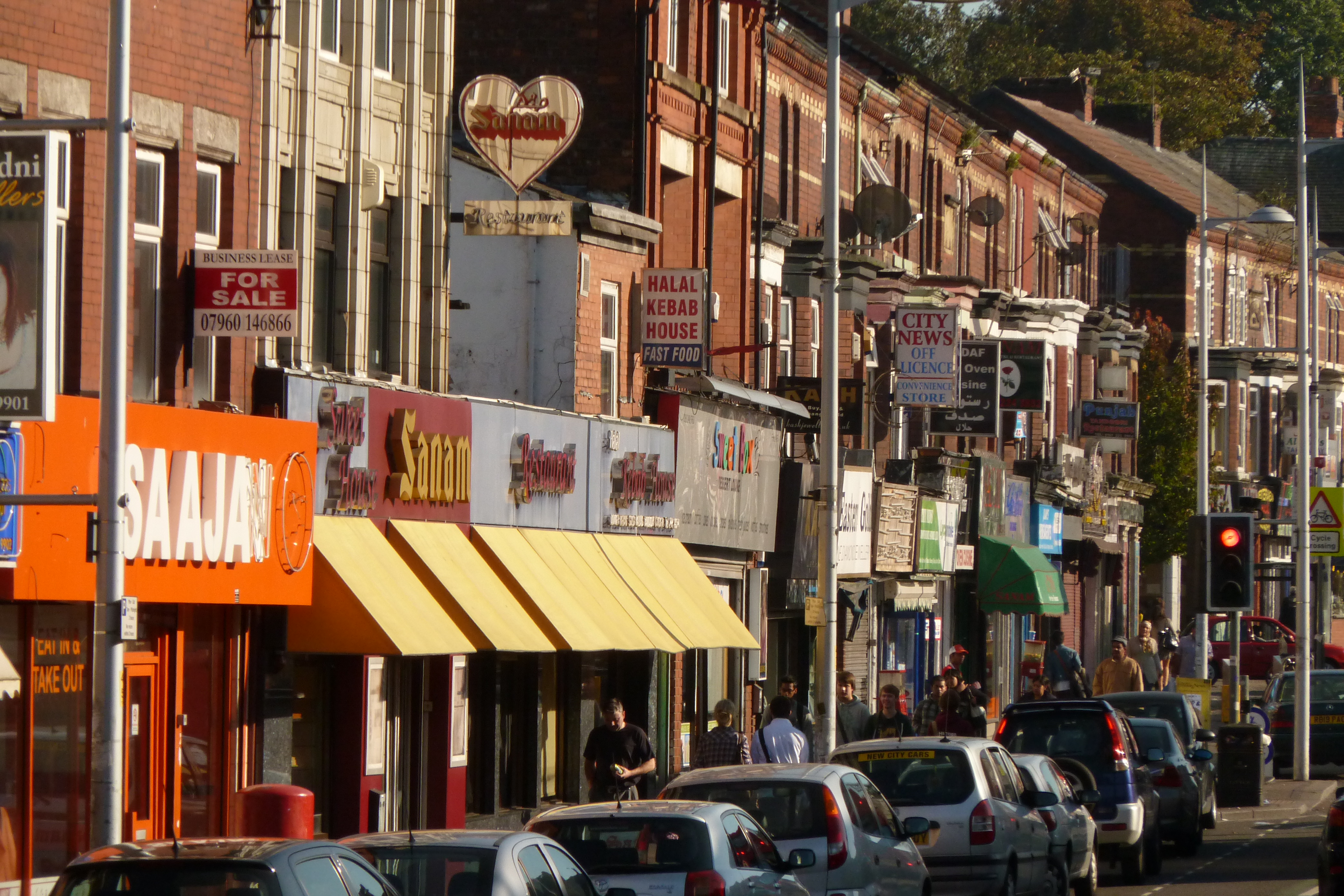
Restaurants along the Curry Mile, Rusholme, south Manchester, England

- Alum Rock, Birmingham
- Bold Street, Liverpool
- Brick Lane
- Camden Town
- Canal Street (Manchester)
- Charlotte Street
- Chinatown, Liverpool
- Chinatown, Manchester
- Chinatown, Newcastle
- Curry Mile
- The Cut, London
- Greek Street
- Lark Lane, Liverpool
- Little Clarendon Street
- Walton Street, Oxford
- Wardour Street

== See also ==
- High Street
- Lists of restaurants
