= 11 Minutes =

11 Minutes may refer to:

- Eleven Minutes, a 2003 novel by Paulo Coelho
- Eleven Minutes, a 2009 documentary film about the first Project Runway winner, Jay McCarroll
- 11 Minutes (film), a 2015 film by Jerzy Skolimowski
- "11 Minutes" (song), a 2019 song by Yungblud and Halsey
- 11 Minutes, a 2022 4-episode documentary TV series by Jeff Zimbalist
