= Kopenhagener Straße =

Street in Berlin-Prenzlauer-Berg, Germany

- Kopenhagener Strasse
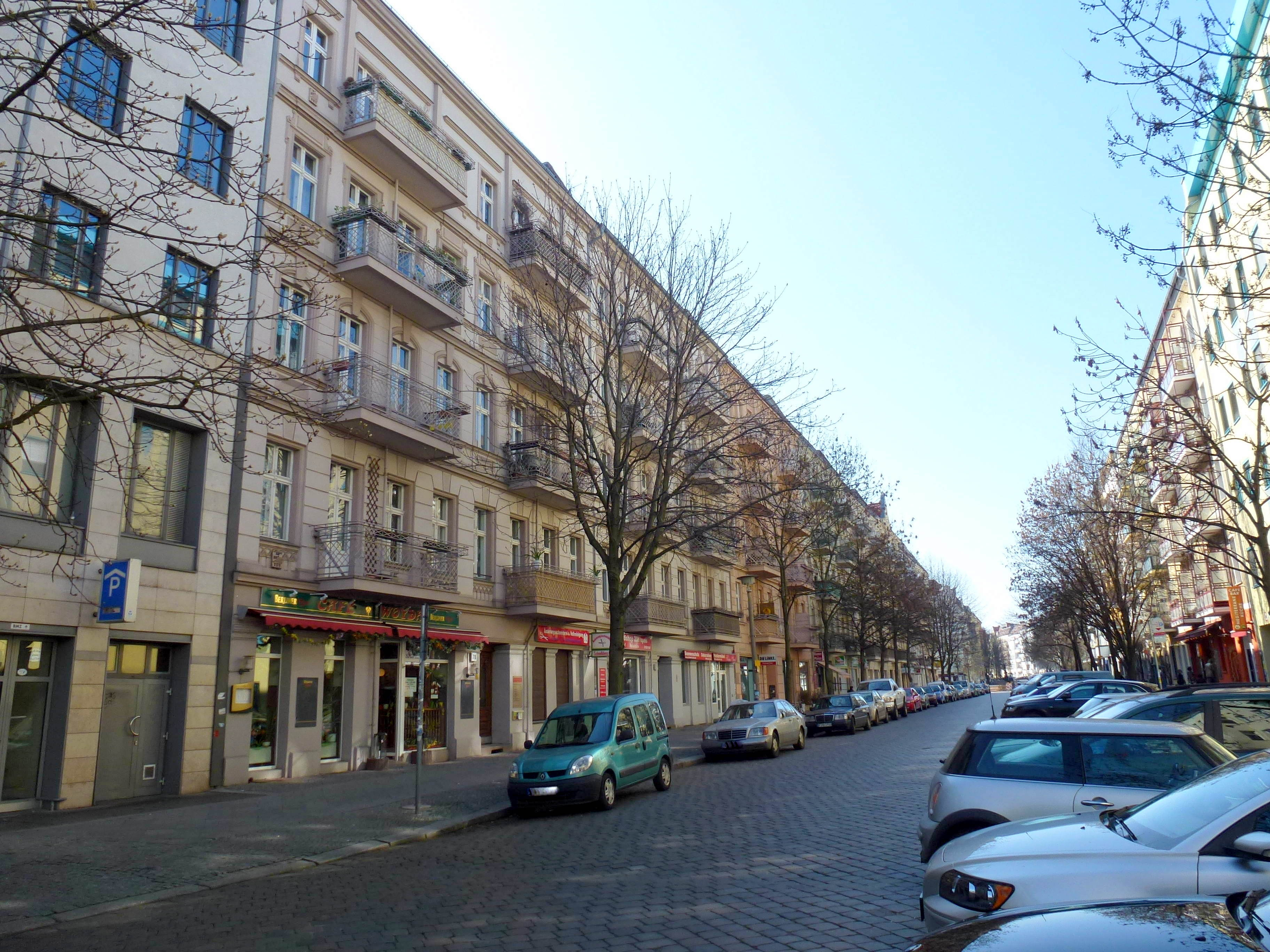
- Kopenhagener Straße
- Interactive map of Kopenhagener Straße
- Former names: Straße Nr. 18, Abt. XI; (until 30 April 1899)
- Namesake: Copenhagen
- Type: Street
- Length: 800 m (2,600 ft)
- Location: Berlin, Germany
- Quarter: Prenzlauer Berg
- Nearest metro station: Schönhauser Allee
- Coordinates: 52°32′56″N 13°24′32″E
- East end: Schönhauser Allee
- Major junctions: Rhinower Straße; Sonnenburger Straße; Ystader Straße
- West end: Schwedter Straße

Kopenhagener Straße, or Kopenhagener Strasse (see ß), is a street in Berlin's Prenzlauer Berg district, which runs parallel to the Ringbahn tracks between busy Schönhauser Allee in the east all the way to the Mauerpark in the west, where the Berlin Wall separated the Soviet from the French sector. The street was named on 30 April 1899 after the Danish capital Copenhagen.

At a length of 800 metres (one-half mile) it features a nearly complete row of 61 apartment buildings built in the Jugendstil period with four modern houses and playgrounds in between. From east to west it is intersected by Rhinower Straße, then crossed by Sonnenburger Straße, by Ystader Straße and finally ends at Schwedter Straße at the northern end of the Mauerpark. At Sonnenburger Straße the Schönfließer Brücke, built in 1908 according to plans by Alfred Grenander, crossed the Ringbahn railway towards the north up until the end of World War II. The bridge was damaged by a bomb in the Allied attack on 3 February 1945, and removed completely at the end of the 1950s. The house at Kopenhagener Straße 17 was destroyed in the process, and parts of it blocked the bridge. As a replacement, a 60 m (200 ft) long pedestrian bridge was installed right beside during the governance of the German Democratic Republic (GDR) in the early 1960s. Between 1945 and at least 1954 a provisional instalment bridged the railway tracks towards the undestroyed (major) part of the Schönfließer Brücke.

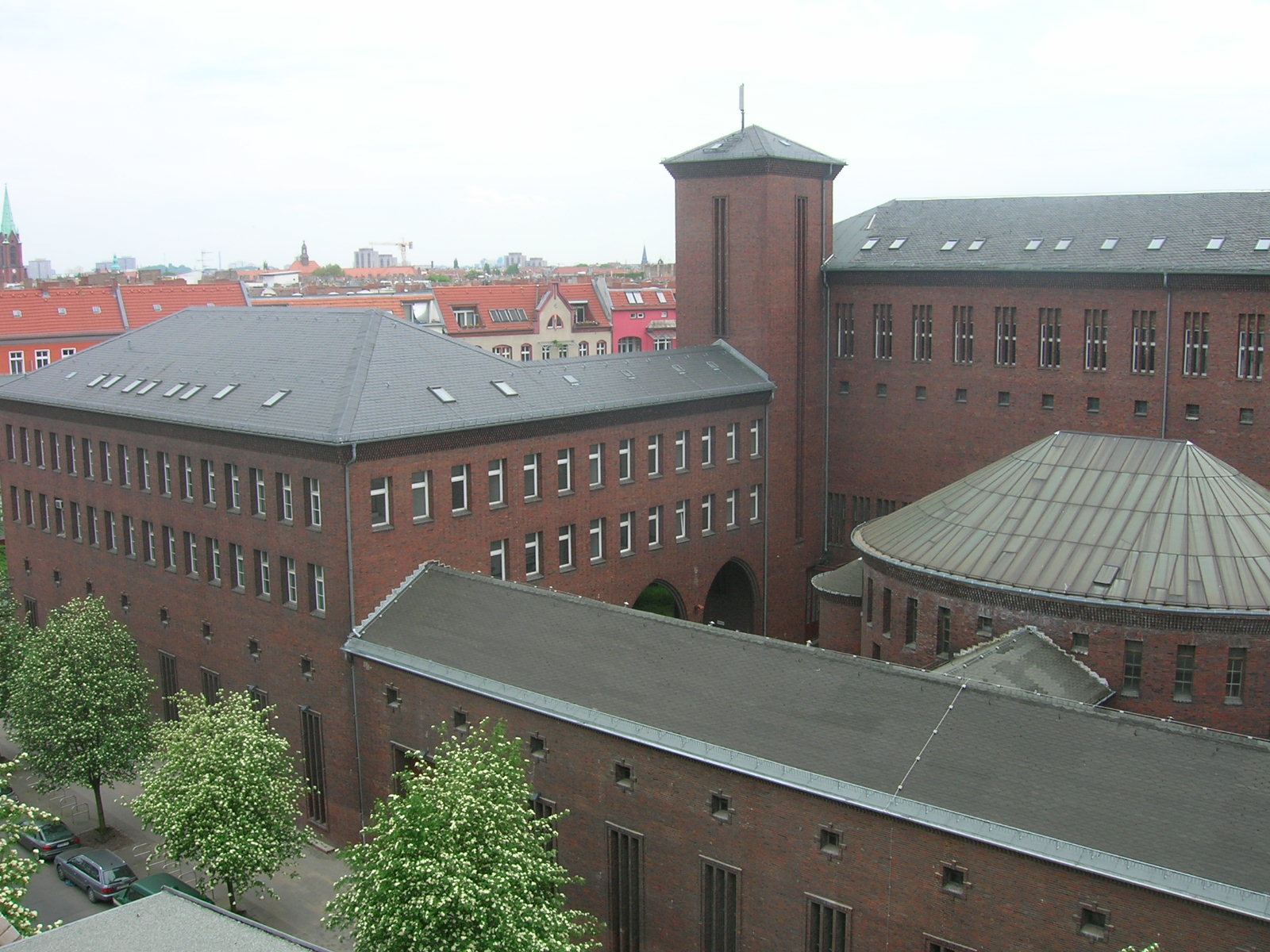
Humboldt transformer station

A study prepared by the geography department at the Humboldt University of Berlin counted 45 artists in the street, making this one of Berlin's significant creative functional clusters. The most obvious structure in the street is the former Humboldt transformer station at No. 61 (on the corner of Sonnenburger Straße), that was planned by the renowned German industrial architect Hans Heinrich Müller. An experimental urban children's farm (the Moritzhof) is located at the western end of the Kopenhagener Straße, providing the surreal view of horses and goats against a backdrop of dense urban housing and the Fernsehturm.

The Kopenhagener Straße was inhabited by artists and bohemians much before German reunification. Despite the renovation and revival of the majority of the buildings since the fall of the Berlin Wall in 1989, the cobblestone street at the northern rim of Berlin's city centre has maintained its pre-unification calm and creative charm. For this reason the Kopenhagener Straße was selected as the movie set for several movies that indulge in GDR Ostalgie, for example Der Rote Kakadu and Sommer vorm Balkon. Aside from artists, many actors, authors and architects also have made the street their home or place of work. Approximately half of the current residents lived in the street before reunification. Newer inhabitants are mostly from former West Germany and other European countries.

== Sources ==
- Die Kulturmeile - Raum für Kunst in der Kopenhagener Straße, Tagesspiegel 20 November 2006
