= Takao II =

Japanese courtesan of the Edo period

Takao II (高尾; 1640 – December 5, 1659), also known as Sendai Takao or Manji Takao, was a tayū (highest-ranking courtesan) of the Yoshiwara red light district of Edo, and one of the most famous courtesans of Japan's Edo period (1603–1867). She debuted in 1655 as the leading courtesan of the Great Miura, the most prestigious Yoshiwara brothel of the day, and rapidly became the leading courtesan of the entirety of Yoshiwara.

Takao II would be one of between six and eleven courtesans to hold the myōseki (inherited name) of 'Takao'. She is particularly famous for her affair with daimyō Date Tsunamune; some time after her death, her story would be featured in kabuki (in the play Meiboku Sendai Hagi), in song and literature, though much of it would be fabricated and fictionalized.

== Portrayal in literature ==
According to the tale, Date Tsunamune, the young daimyō of Mutsu, visited Yoshiwara Red Light District as the result of a dispute involving family politics. His uncle sought to undermine his reputation in order to replace Tsunamune with his own son, and indirectly encouraged Tsunamune to debauch himself in the pleasure quarters. Tsunamune fell in love with Takao, but Takao rejected him, as she had promised to marry her lover at the end of her contract with the brothel. Tsunamune offered to buy out her contract by paying gold equal to her weight. The brothel owner weighted her sleeves down with iron until she weighed more than 165 pounds (75 kg). Despite this, Tsunamune paid her weight in gold, thus buying her out of her contract.

According to one version of the story, on the boat to Tsunamune's home, at a spot on the river called Three Forks (Mitsumata), Takao tried to leap into the river to either escape or drown. Tsunamune flew into a rage and killed her with his blade, then flung her body into the river. Tsunamune's uncle used the murder to force Tsunamune into retirement.

According to another version, Takao refused Tsunamune even after he bought her freedom, so he had one of her fingers broken each day for ten days. When she continued to defy him, he had her taken to Mitsumata and hanged.

This is the tale popularized in kabuki theatre, in song, poetry and literature.

=== Historical inaccuracies ===
While based to a great extent on fact, there are a number of historical inaccuracies, the greatest of which is Takao's death at Tsunamune's hand. Three contemporary sources, including one discovered by Santō Kyōzan, younger brother of the famous writer Santō Kyōden, describe her as dying of pneumonia or tuberculosis at the age of 19. The most complete account of her life, Takabyōbu kuda monogatari ("Tales of Grumbling Otokodate"; 1660), adds that several of Takao's former suitors held a memorial for her and bought a tombstone, but they were criticized for not showing her the same devotion during her final illness.

Another key inaccuracy in the tale involves Tsunamune, whose family members did attempt to unseat him, but who had already given up his position by the time of their encounter.

The description of the relationship between Tsunamune and Takao is also inaccurate. Takao may not have been interested in Tsunamune, but there is no evidence that she intended to marry someone else. A famous love letter from Takao to Tsunamune is known to be a forgery.

== See also ==
- Nakasu (Edo) – a small entertainment district erected at Three Forks (Mitsumata), the spot where Takao was supposedly killed a century earlier.

== Bibliography ==
- Seigle, Cecilia Segawa (1993). Yoshiwara: The Glittering World of the Japanese Courtesan. University of Hawaii Press. ISBN 9780824814885.
- Yasutaka, Teruoka (2000). "The pleasure quarters and Tokugawa culture". 18th century Japan: culture and society. Curzon. ISBN 978-0700711840. OCLC 40588403.
