= Barrio Húmedo =

Spanish city

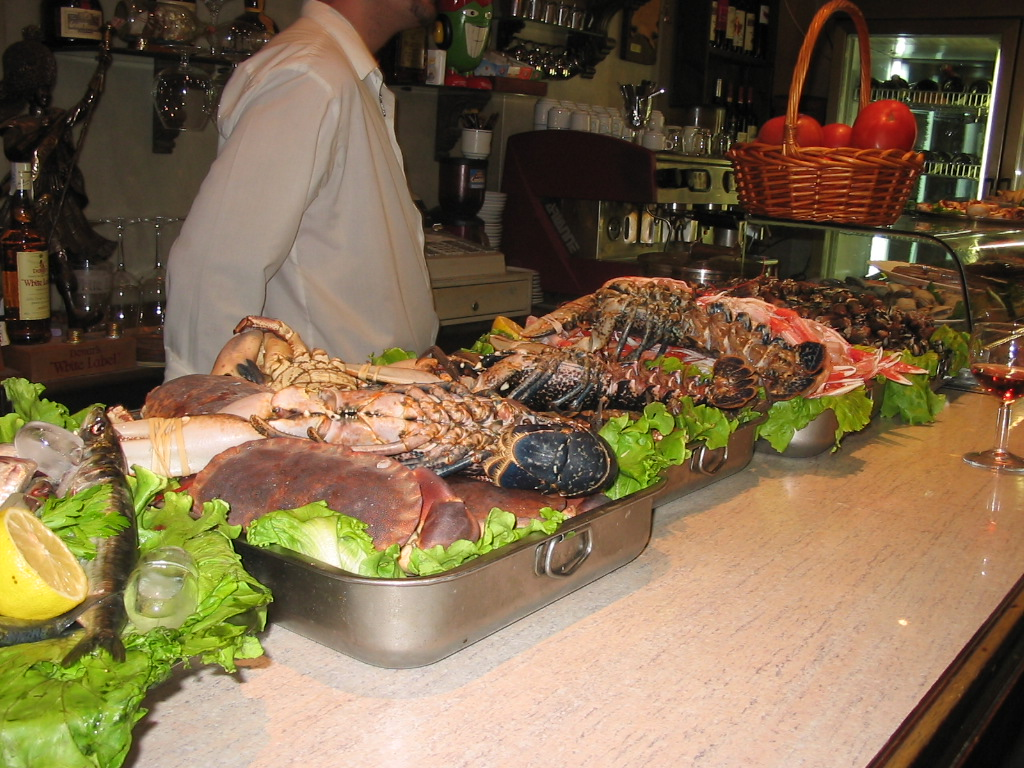
Food on sale in Barrio Humedo

Barrio Húmedo is the nickname given to an old part of the city of León, Spain, that is concentrated within the largely intact Roman city walls. The translation is usually rendered as the wet district, a reference both to the large number of bars and clubs packed into a relatively small area and to the copious quantities of alcohol consumed inside them. The area is centered on the square called Plaza de San Martín, from where an intricate network of streets spreads out towards the newer parts of León. Within the Barrio Húmedo is also the Plaza Mayor, which contains the local market that has taken place since 1660. Calle Ancha, generally considered to be the main street within Barrio Húmedo, is popular among both tourists and locals due to the many shops, boutiques, and bookstores, in addition to the distinctive large number of bars and restaurants. There are approximately between 100 and 150 bars and clubs within Barrio Húmedo.

The district is famous throughout Spain for both its density and intensity of bars and clubs and because of León's reputation for free tapas bars. The most common practice of those who visit the bars is to pub crawl (have one drink and then move on to the next bar).

Tapas are mostly served from 9 p.m. to 12 a.m. At around 10:30 p.m., people sometimes start to have dinner in the restaurants that are often located inside the same tapas bars. These restaurants tend to specialize in traditional Leonese cuisine; there are a number of quite prestigious and famous ones.

Barrio Húmedo also features rock and heavy metal bars, glamorous nightclubs and Irish-style pubs.

In 2004, the Chancellor of Germany at the time, Gerhard Schröder, was seen partying at a bar in Barrio Húmedo called La Abaceria with former Prime Minister of Spain and León native José Luis Rodríguez Zapatero. Since then, this bar is sometimes referred to as the Schröder Bar by some.

== See also ==
- List of restaurant districts and streets
- Matar judíos (lit. 'killing Jews')
