= 7th Street (Johannesburg) =

Street in Melville, South Africa

Coordinates: 26°10′39″S 28°0′31″E

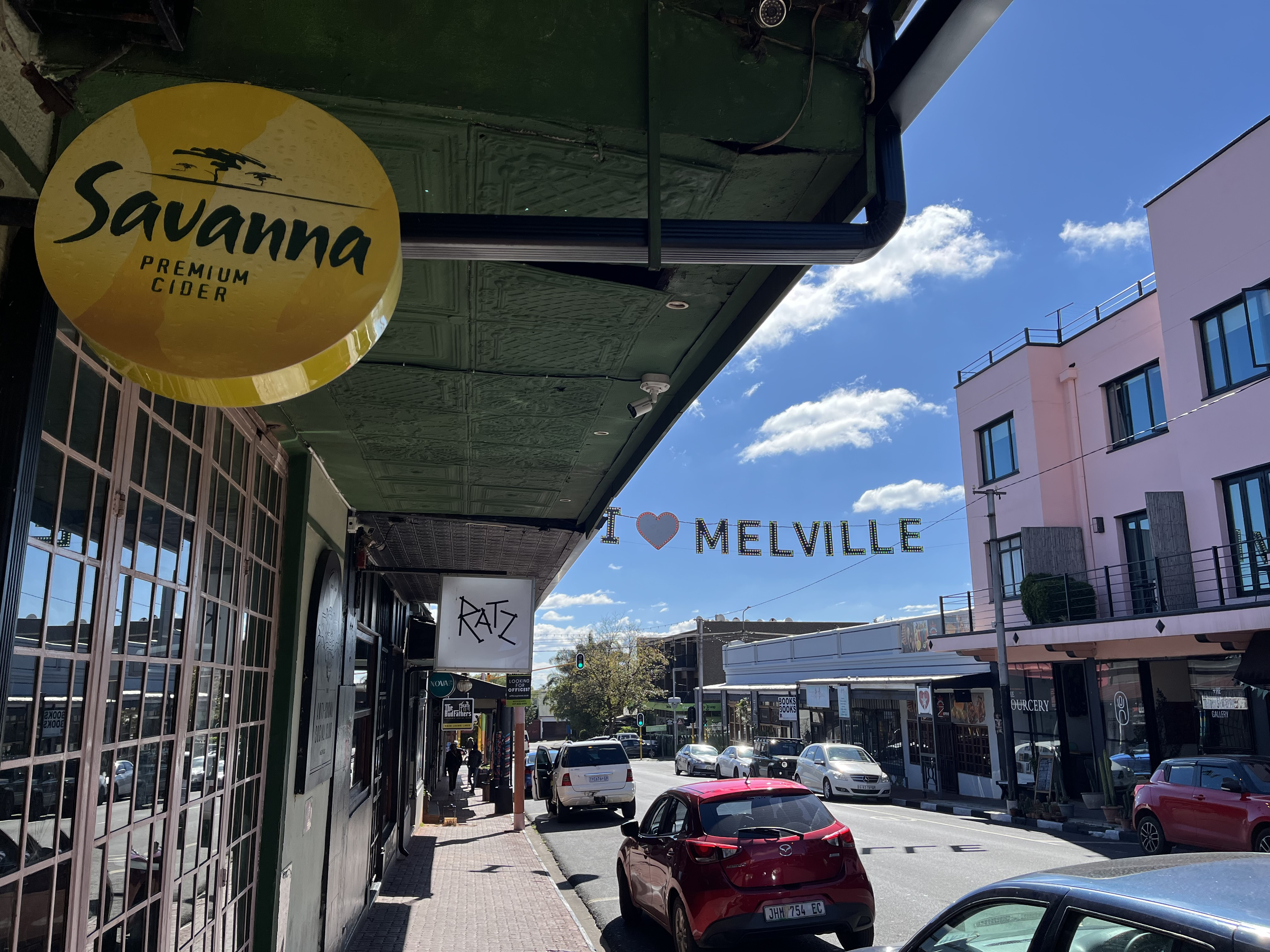
7th Street (Johannesburg)

7th Street is a street located in the Johannesburg suburb of Melville. It is lined with many restaurants and bars, which are mostly frequented by students from the nearby University of Johannesburg. It is featured in the South African soap opera 7de Laan.

== See also ==
- List of restaurant districts and streets
