= Bochum Total =

Annual music festival in Bochum, Germany

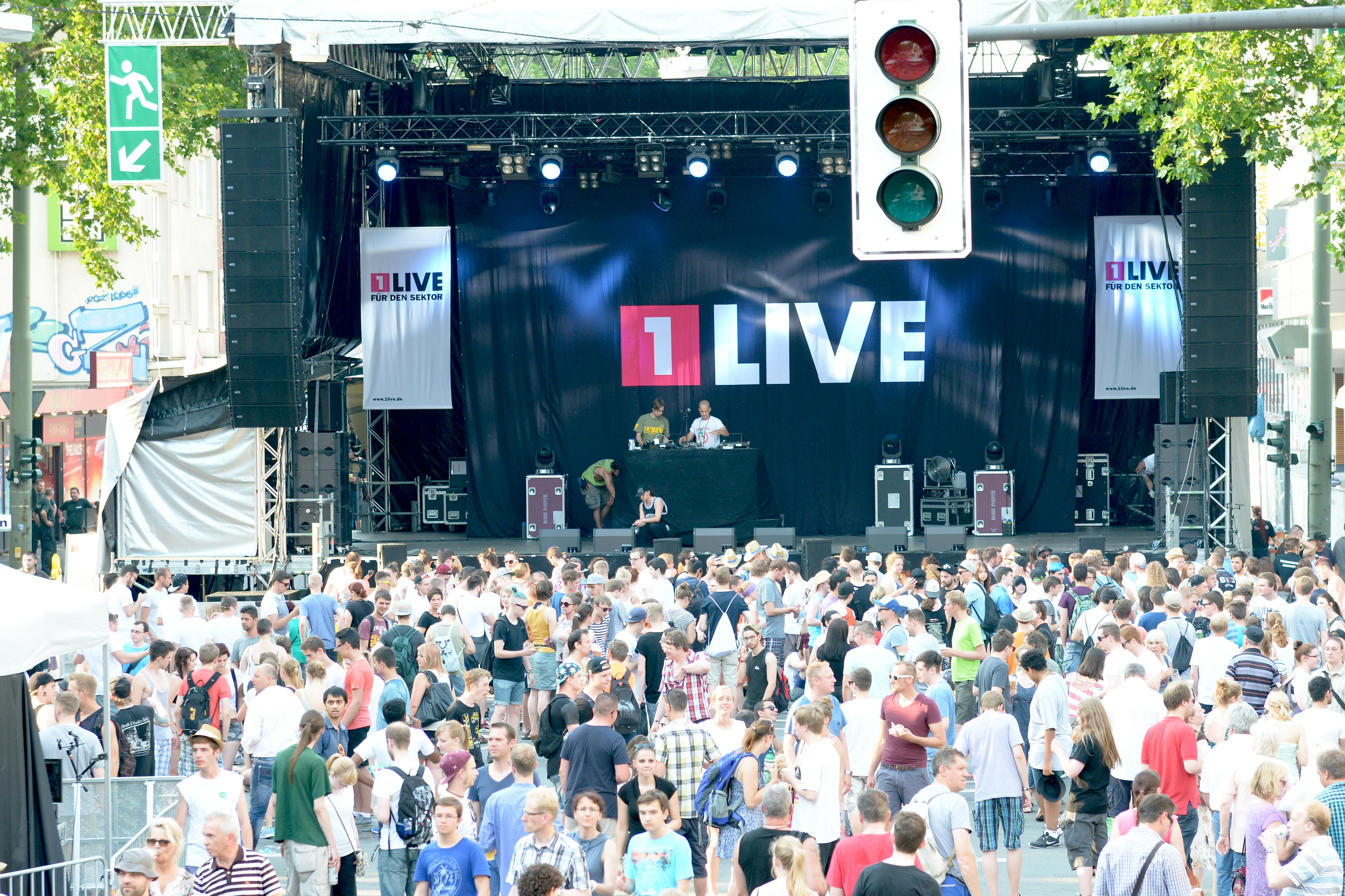
Bochum Total 2015, 1Live stage

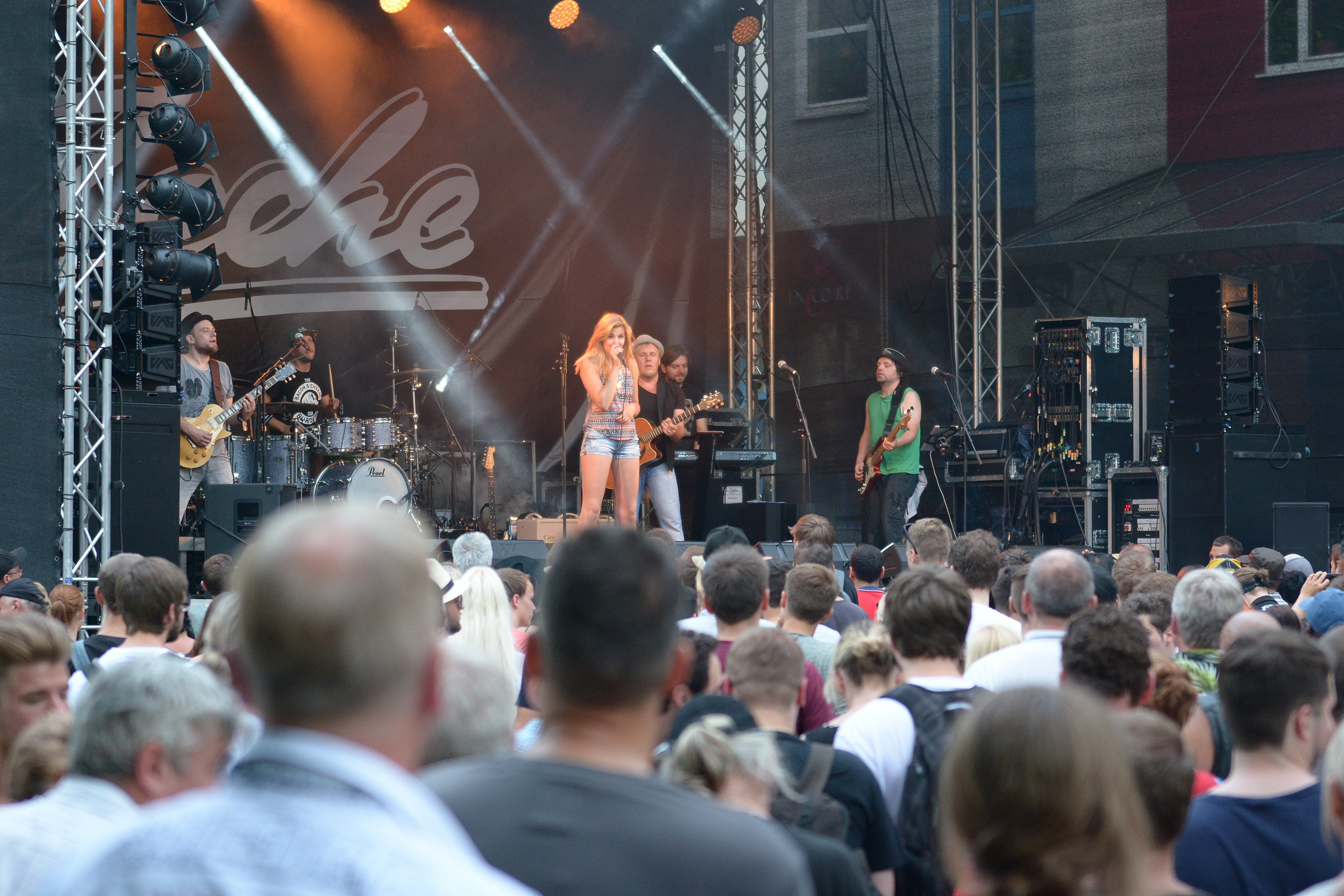
Bochum Total 2015, Ring stage

Bochum Total is an annual music festival in Bochum, Germany. Bochum Total usually begins on the first Thursday of the summer break; in 2011, however, it took place from July 21 to July 24. It is a so-called 'Umsonst-und-draussen-Festival' (English: for free and outside) which means there are no charges for entering the festival area.

It is held in and around the amusement quarter of Bochum, the so-called Bermudadreieck (English lit.: Bermuda Triangle). During the four days of the festival, the southern part of the town centre is blocked to car traffic, since some stages are built on the streets. The artists playing and music genres are diverse, ranging from jazz to heavy metal music.

The festival first took place in 1986 with only two stages, whereas there are now four, with many other events in the pubs, clubs and discotheques fringeing the event, which has become one of the biggest free music festivals in Europe.
