= Schwedter Straße =

Street in Berlin, Germany

Coordinates: 52.540626°N 13.404543°E

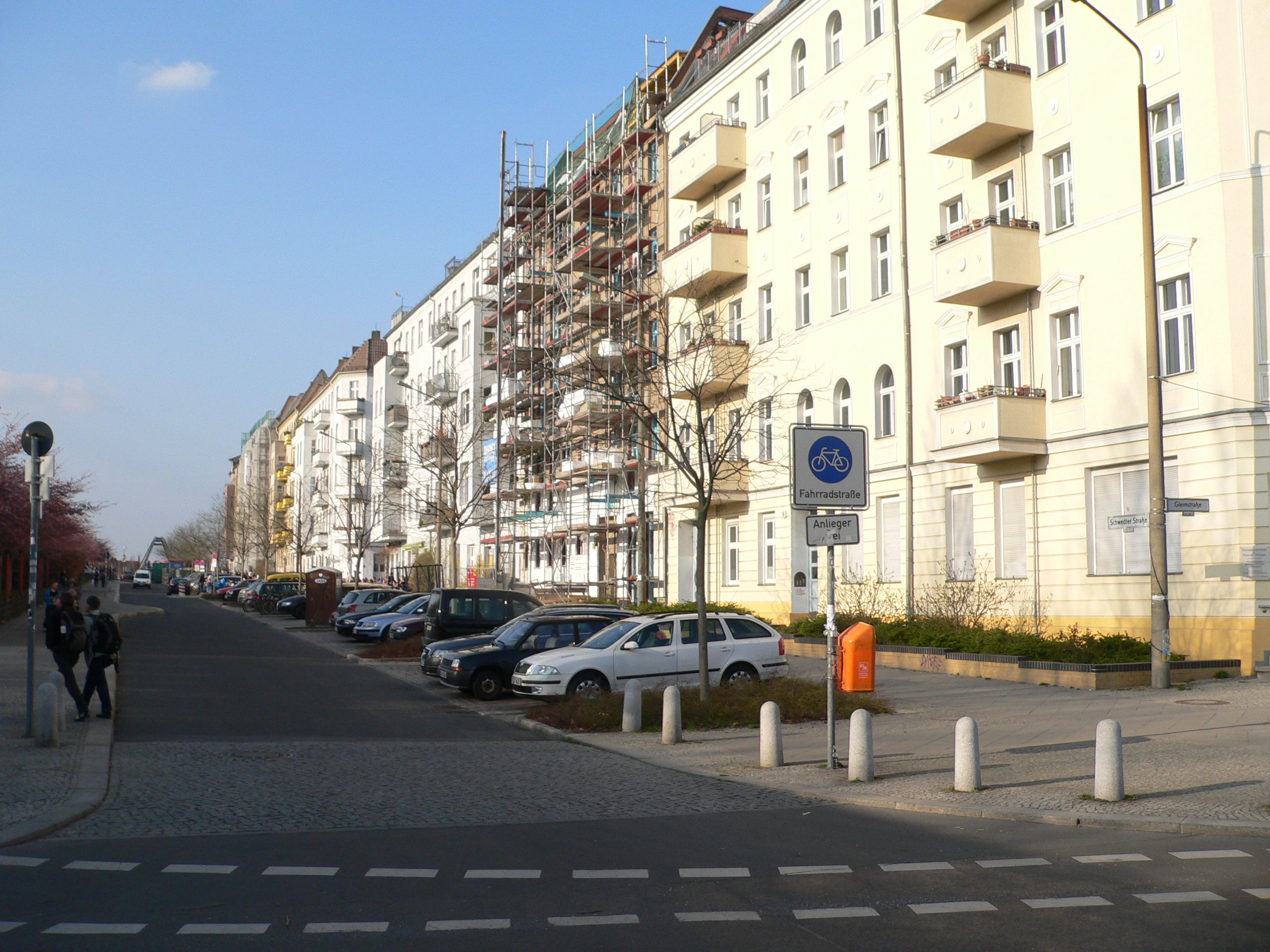
Schwedter Straße, northern section in Prenzlauer Berg

Schwedter Straße, named after the town of Schwedt/Oder, is an inner-city road in the Mitte and Prenzlauer Berg districts of Berlin. It partially forms the border between both quarters and crosses Mauerpark at the site of the former Berlin Wall.

== History ==
A dirt road running northwards from the Berlin Customs Wall near Schönhausen Gate is documented since the 18th century. Then called Verlorener Weg (a "Lost Road" disappearing in the fields), it led to the now defunct Marthashof, a deaconesses' home established in 1854. The road was paved about 1860 and renamed Schwedterstraße on 29 May 1862.

The adjacent area was rapidly built up with multistorey apartment blocks during the quick growth of Berlin in the late 19th century. In 1877 the terminus of the Berlin Northern Railway line opened at the corner with Bernauer Straße. From 1961 to 1989, the northern sections of Schwedter Straße ran directly at the Berlin Wall.

== Course ==
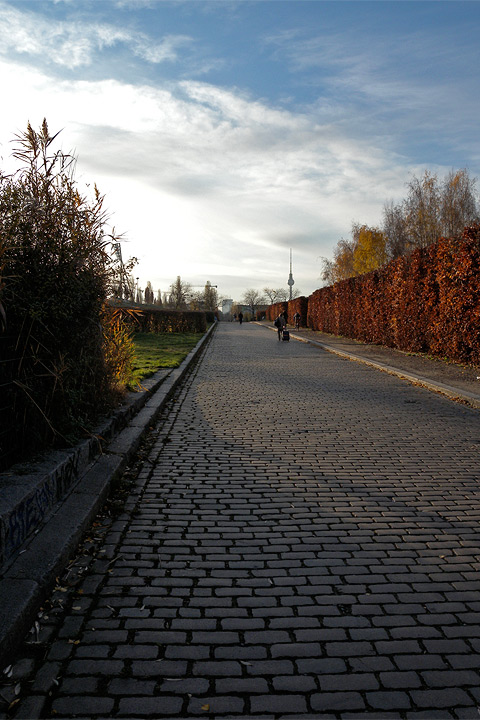
Mauerpark section

The street branches off Schönhauser Allee at Senefelderplatz, runs northwestwards and marks the boundary between Prenzlauer Berg (Pankow borough) in the northeast and Mitte in the southwest before reaching the corner with Bernauer Straße. From here, Schwedter Straße runs through Mauerpark, bypassing Friedrich-Ludwig-Jahn-Sportpark and Max-Schmeling-Halle, and is closed to traffic. The northern section is sign-posted as a bicycle boulevard.
