= Rua do Cunha =

Pedestrian street in Taipa, Macau

Coordinates: 22.15368°N 113.55692°E

- 官也街
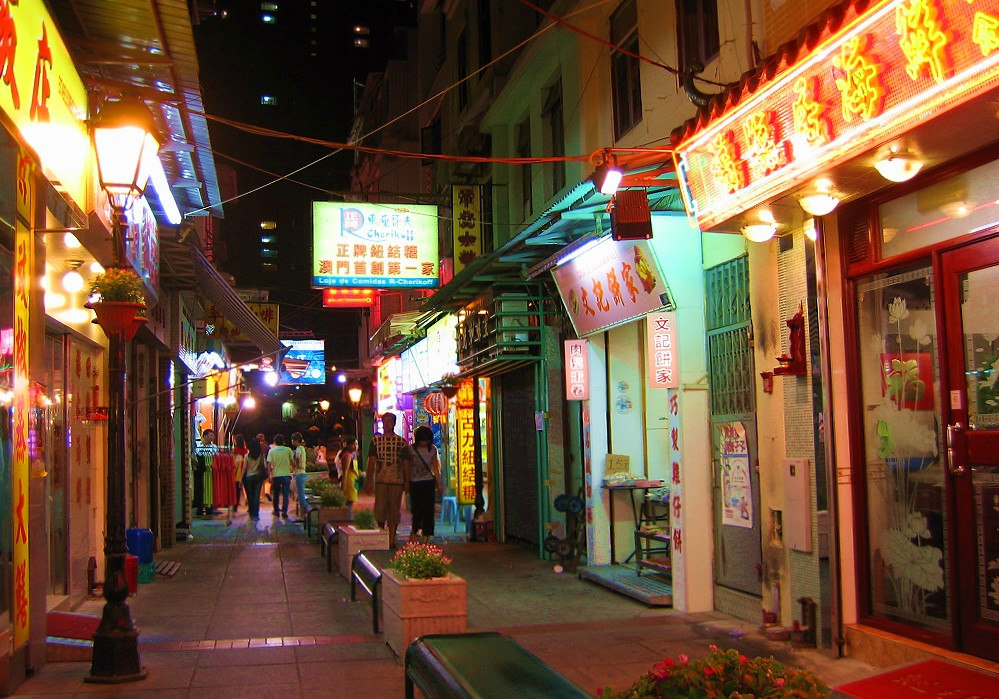
- View of Rua do Cunha at night
- Interactive map of Rua do Cunha
- Length: 136 m (446 ft)
- Location: Macau

Rua do Cunha
- Chinese: 官也街
Transcriptions
Yue: Cantonese
- Jyutping: gun1 jaa5 gaai1

Rua do Cunha (Chinese: 官也街; lit. Cunha Street) is a narrow pedestrian street in Vila da Taipa, the town centre of Taipa, Macau. The street is named after Pedro Alexandrino da Cunha, a Portuguese navy captain who was the 81st Governor of Macau. He arrived in Macau in 1850 and he died 37 days later from cholera, being one of the first victims of the disease in Macau.

It is known for souvenir shops selling almond cakes, phoenix egg rolls, coconut flakes, cherikoff, and peanut candy, It is also known for its various Portuguese restaurants, including 'O Santos', which has been in business since 1989, and 'O Galo'.

== Gallery ==
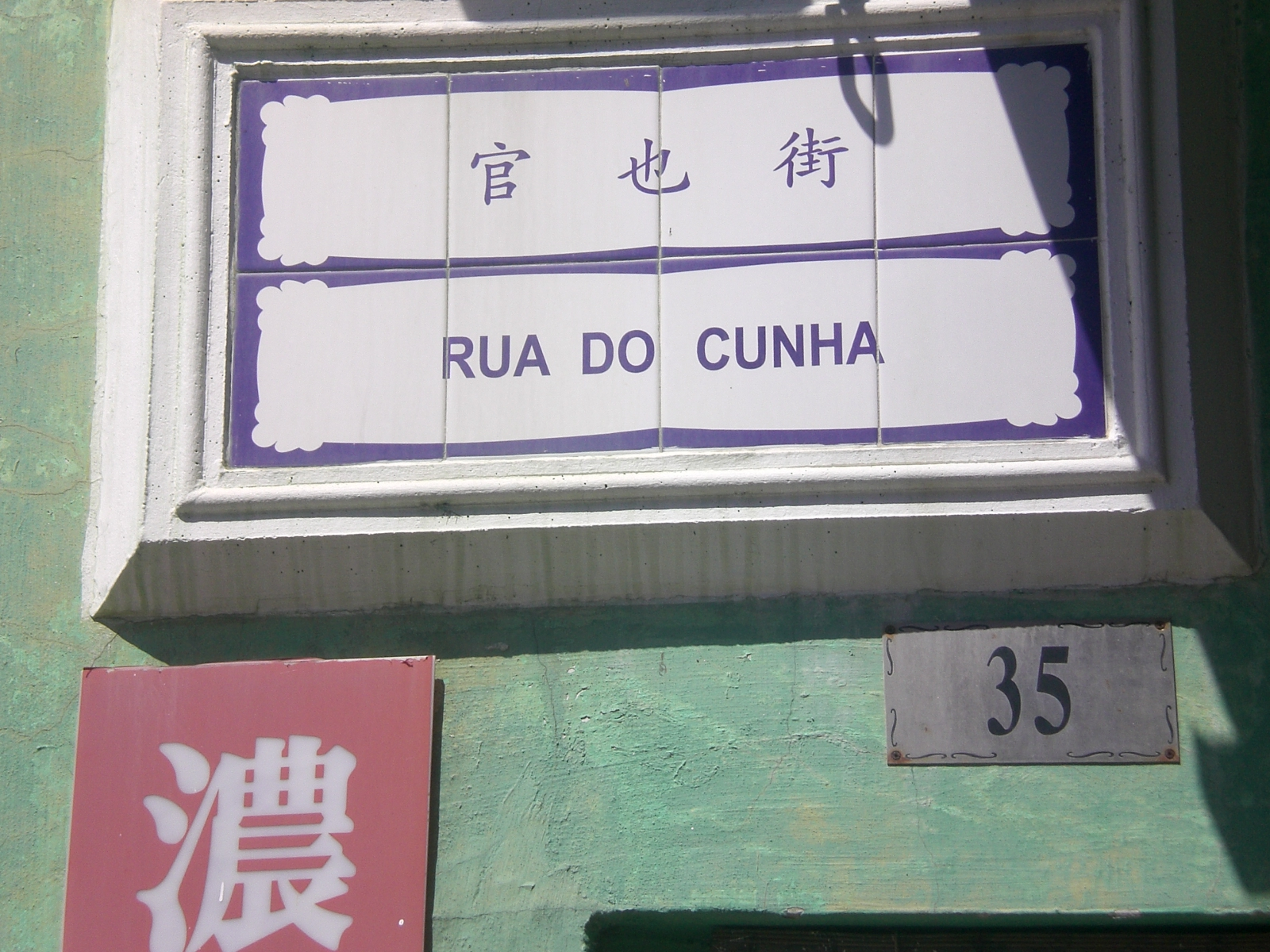
Rua do Cunha street sign

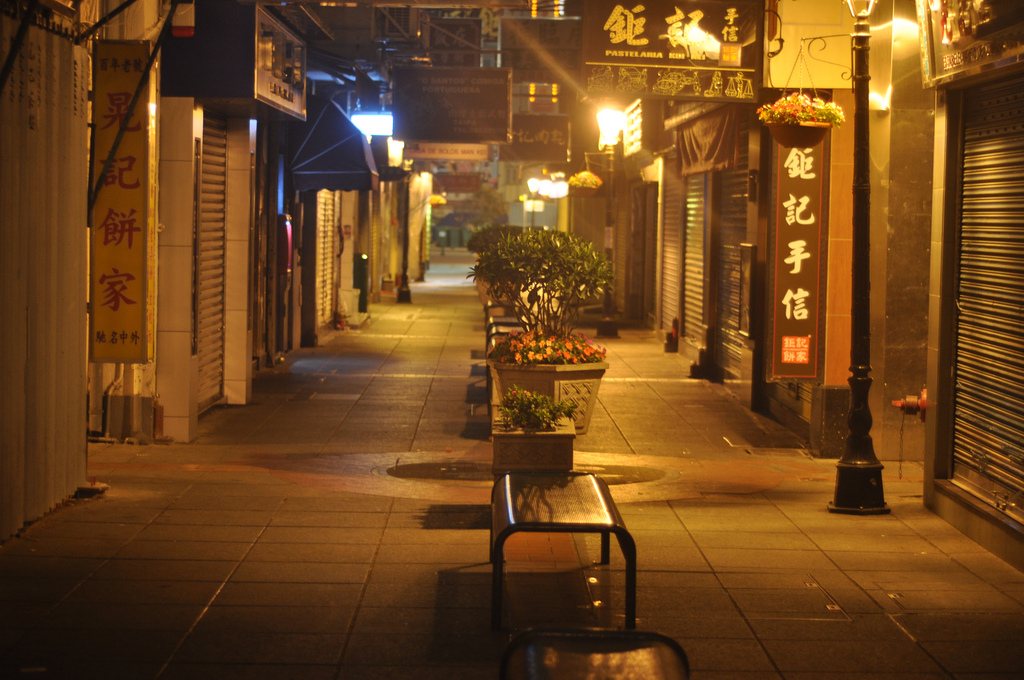
Rua do Cunha at night

== See also ==
- List of restaurant districts and streets
