= Bermudadreieck =

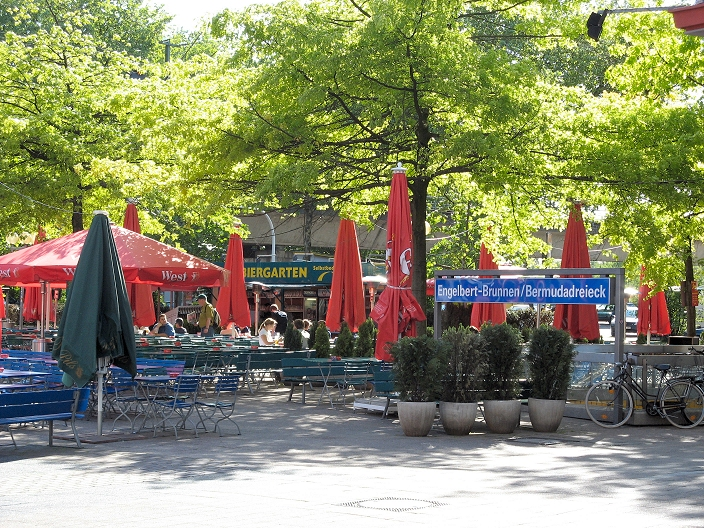
Here starts the Bermuda Triangle. It is the popular name of the quarter around Graf-Engelbert Monument where Bochum's legendary "scene" is located.

Bermudadreieck or Bermuda3Eck (Bermuda Triangle) is the designation for an area in the center of Bochum, Germany, with a high density of bars and restaurants, bounded by (clockwise from top) the streets Südring, Brüderstraße, Kortumstraße and Viktoriastraße. The number of gastronomic establishments has increased since the beginning of the 1980s, spurred by the short distance to the Bochum Theater, Union Theater and the main train station. It is served by Engelbert-Brunnen/Bermudadreieck U-Straßenbahn Station, on lines 308 & 318.

== Culture and cuisine ==
There are over 60 catering establishments in the Bermuda Triangle. The area has expanded to approximately 2 km^{2} with seating for over 8,000, including 4,200 seats outdoors. Over 3 million visitors are served per year. On sunny, summer weekends, there are often up to 30,000 visitors a day, including tourists from all across Germany. During major events, such as Bochum Total, numbers can reach up to 300,000 a day. The Bermuda Triangle provides about 1,600 jobs. The development of the area has privatized once-public space and turned it into beer gardens, which, although not without controversy, has been accepted by the general population.

Bermuda Triangle property rates have risen so much in recent years, that longtime retailers are increasingly forced out. The vacant spaces are then taken over by the restaurant and catering sector. Triangle prices for food and beverages are often above the local average, sometimes comparing with expensive cities like Düsseldorf, Munich and Hamburg.

The heart of the Bermuda Triangle is the square around the now removed Engelbert Fountain, named after Count Engelbert III of the Mark. There is a procession each year, named the Maiabendfest (May Evening Festival). The fountain was removed in spring 2009.

Among the major events are:

- the multi-day "Bochum Total," the biggest music festival in Europe
- "Stühle raus", the annual symbolic opening of the open air season.
- the Maiabendfest (May Evening Fest), a local festival steeped in tradition and legend, featuring a long procession.

The Bermuda Triangle is a cultural focal point of Bochum and a popular meeting place for people from throughout the Ruhr region. In addition to these events, it is near the Schauspielhaus Bochum, a nightclub, several cinemas and the construction site of a new concert hall for the Bochum Symphony Orchestra to be erected nearby.

== History ==
With a multitude of diverse catering outlets, Logos Gruppe counts among the main developers of the Bermuda3Eck since the 1980s. In the mid 90s they covered almost the whole market in the Bermuda3Eck with a broad spectrum of diverse catering concepts. Logos Gruppe were initiators of ISG Bermuda3Eck e.V., one of the first business improvement districts of North Rhine-Westphalia, with Logos CEO Hans-Joachim Hauschulz a member of its supervisory board.

== See also ==
- List of restaurant districts and streets
