= Nihonbashi Nakasu =

Nihonbashi Nakasu (日本橋中洲) is a neighbourhood in the Nihonbashi area of Tokyo, Japan. It was the site of a short-lived but vibrant and popular entertainment district built upon an artificial landfill in the Sumida River, at a place called Mitsumata (三又, "Three Forks"), in 1771, and lasted until 1790, when the landfill was removed.

== Nakasu pleasure district ==
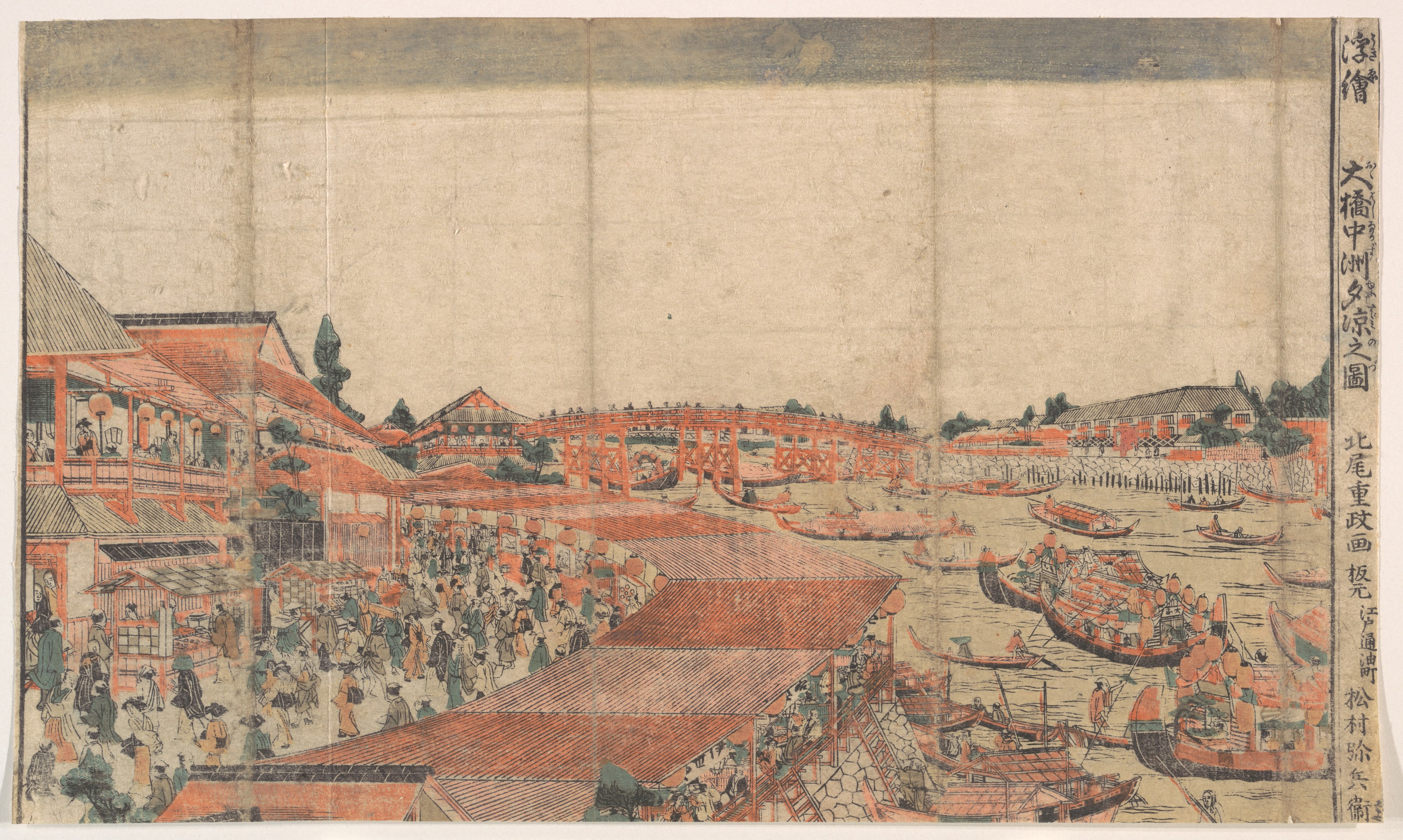
Ukiyo-e depiction of Nakasu by Kitao Shigemasa, late 1770s

Mitsumata, a short distance from the Yoshiwara pleasure district, had long been a popular spot for entertainment. Teahouses, restaurants, and houseboats were common there, and it was a popular site for pleasure boating as well. A famous, but likely fictional, tale of a courtesan named Takao II took place there in the 1660s; she was bought from the Yoshiwara by daimyō Date Tsunamune for her weight in gold, and when brought on Date's pleasure boat to Mitsumata, she tried to leap overboard, to drown herself, out of depression. She was instead murdered, stabbed, by Tsunamune.

In any case, by 1771, Nakasu had become popular enough, and crowded with enough restaurants and teahouses, that the shogunate decided to create an artificial landfill jutting out into the river. There gradually appeared many more places of entertainment, and "by 1779, there were eighteen restaurants (some catering exclusively to daimyo deputies), ninety-three teahouses, fourteen boathouses, and at least twenty-seven geisha." This made it the greatest concentration of famous restaurants and teahouses anywhere in Japan.

The area became especially prosperous in 1787, when a fire ravaged the Yoshiwara. A number of proprietors of Yoshiwara establishments were allowed to set up shop in Nakasu temporarily, and for a few years, the area truly flourished. Courtesans plied their trade, free of the complex and burdensome rituals and procedures of the Yoshiwara, and their young attendants were able to experience a bit more of a normal childhood. However, many courtesans relied on those same rituals and procedures to maintain a certain degree of class and restraint. Outside the Yoshiwara, they were unable to be as discerning as usual in choosing their clients, and suffered less comfortable room arrangements. Overall, the arrangement was very freeing for the courtesans and their clients, but less classy as well. As another example, courtesans in Nakasu might wear the same kimono for an entire day, or over multiple days, not bothering to look her absolute best; this saved a lot of bother and money for the courtesans and their establishments, but it also reduced them to looking, and possibly behaving, not too unlike lower-grade prostitutes.

However, the corrupt politician Tanuma Okitsugu was ousted in 1786, and replaced with a more severe moralist, Matsudaira Sadanobu. Citing the flooding caused upstream by the partial blockage of the river by the landfill, Matsudaira ordered it removed, and the river restored, in 1790.
