= Mauerpark =

Park in Pankow, Germany

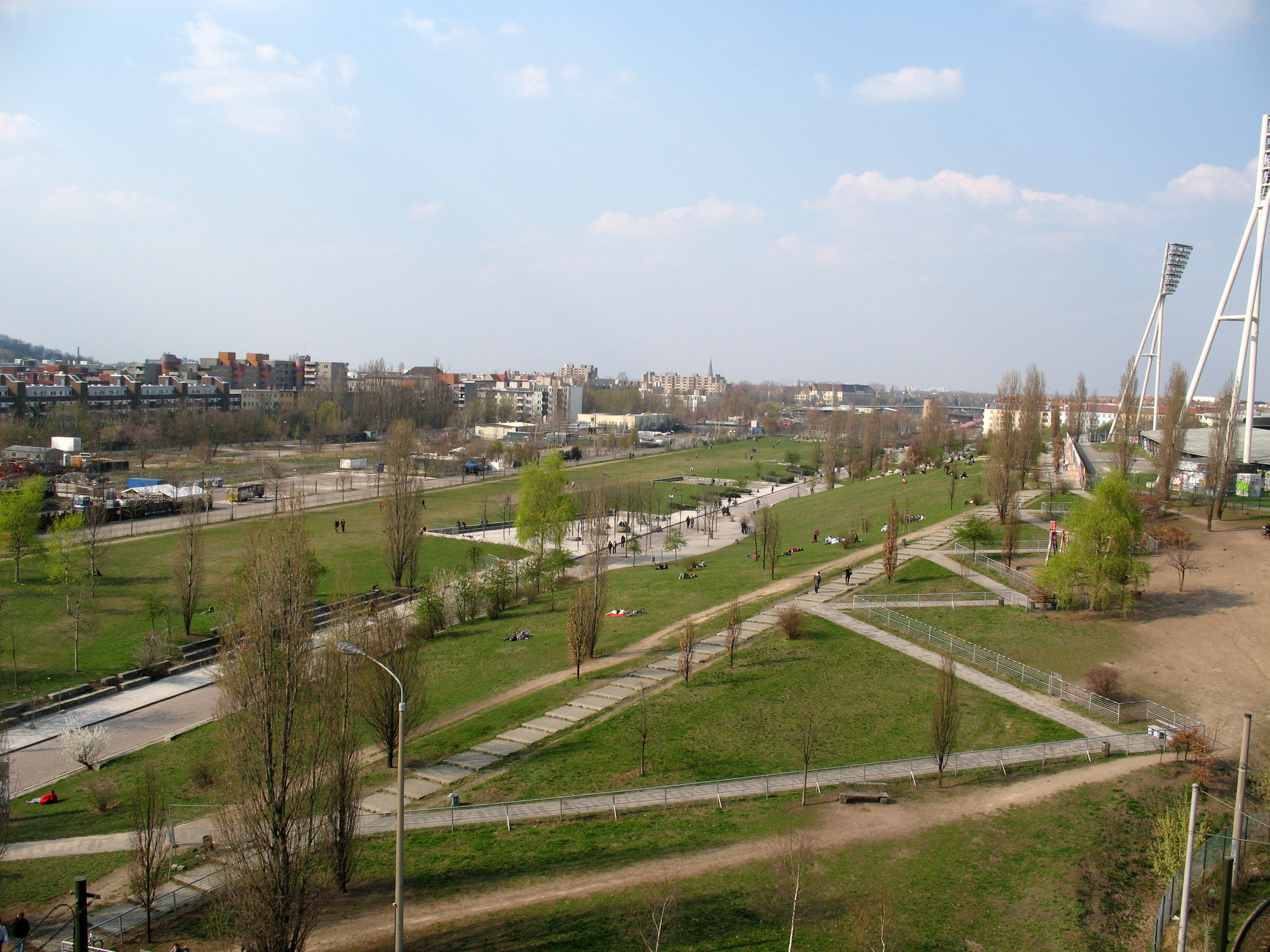
- Mauerpark seen from east to west, on the right floodlight masts of the Friedrich-Ludwig-Jahn-Sportpark

- Location within Berlin
- Type: Urban park
- Location: Prenzlauer Berg, Berlin
- Coordinates: 52°32′37″N 13°24′12″E
- Area: 15 hectares (37 acres) (planned for 2019)
- Created: 1922-1924
- Status: Open year-round

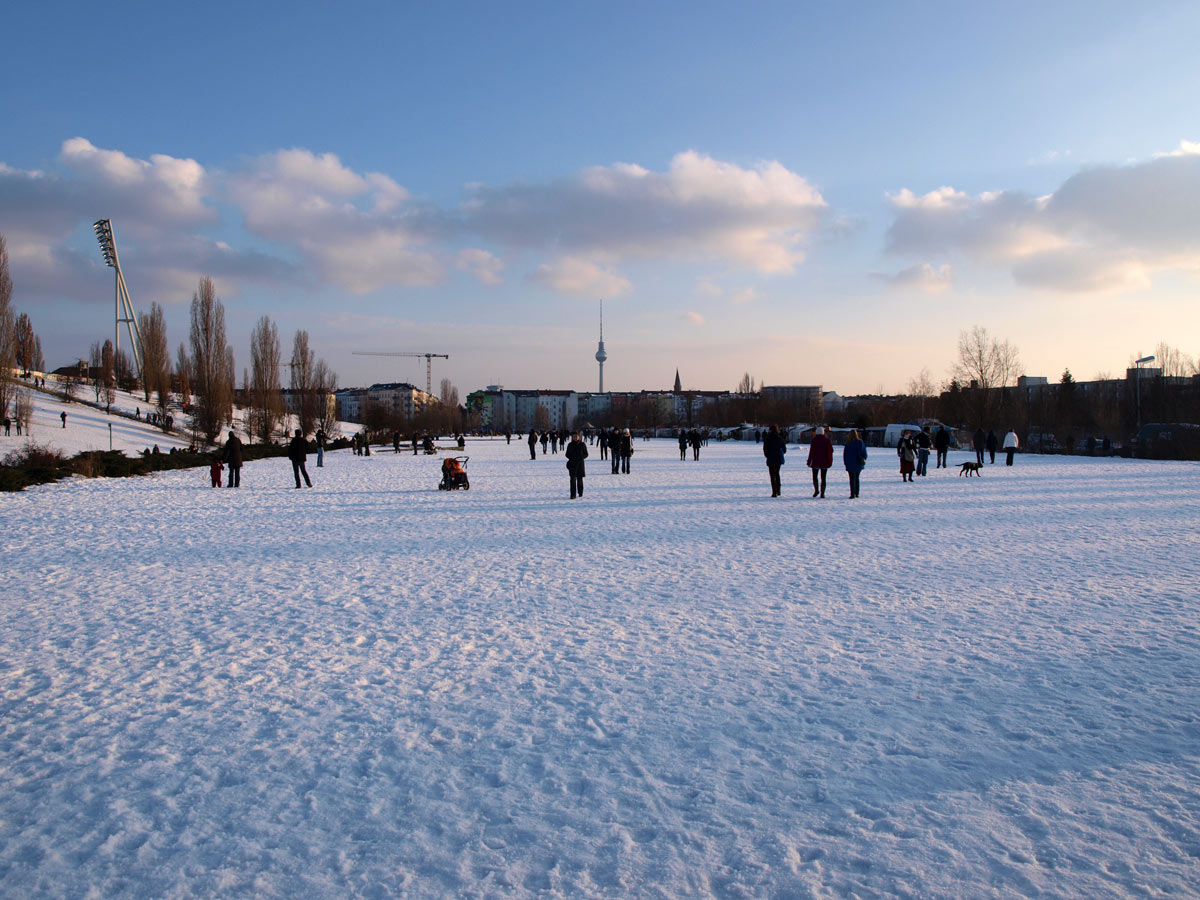
Mauerpark in Winter 2010

Mauerpark is a public linear park in Berlin's Prenzlauer Berg district. The name translates to "Wall Park", referring to its status as a former part of the Berlin Wall and its Death Strip. The park is located at the border of Prenzlauer Berg and Gesundbrunnen district of former West Berlin.

== Old Nordbahnhof ==
In the 19th and 20th centuries, the Mauerpark area served as the location of the Old Nordbahnhof ("Northern Railway Station"), the southern terminus of the Prussian Northern Railway opened in 1877-78, which connected Berlin with the city of Stralsund and the Baltic Sea. Soon after it lost its role as a passenger station to the nearby Stettiner Bahnhof and remained in use as a freight yard. In 1950 the Stettiner Bahnhof took the name Nordbahnhof because of its role in Berlin's public transportation system, and the Old Nordbahnhof became known as Güterbahnhof Eberswalder Straße. It was finally closed after the building of the Berlin Wall in 1961.

When viewed from above, one can still see remains of the railroad tracks running towards the former station from the Ringbahn.

== Berlin divided ==
In 1946, through the division of Berlin into four occupation zones, the land of the Old Nordbahnhof stretching from Bernauer Straße to Kopenhagener Straße was split between the French and Soviet sectors. After the building of the Berlin Wall, the land was included into the heavily guarded Death Strip with walls on either side. One of the viewing platforms, from which West Berlin residents could look over the wall into East Berlin, stood at this location. The remaining western part of the station was turned into a storehouse and commercial area.

An interesting aspect and a problem for the East German guards was that the anterior part of the Wall strip was located on the steep embankment of the former railway tracks at a higher elevation than the adjacent area in the west. Yet in 1988, the East Berlin authorities concluded an agreement with the West to acquire a strip of land at the bottom of the hill to set up a more efficient border.

Mauerpark

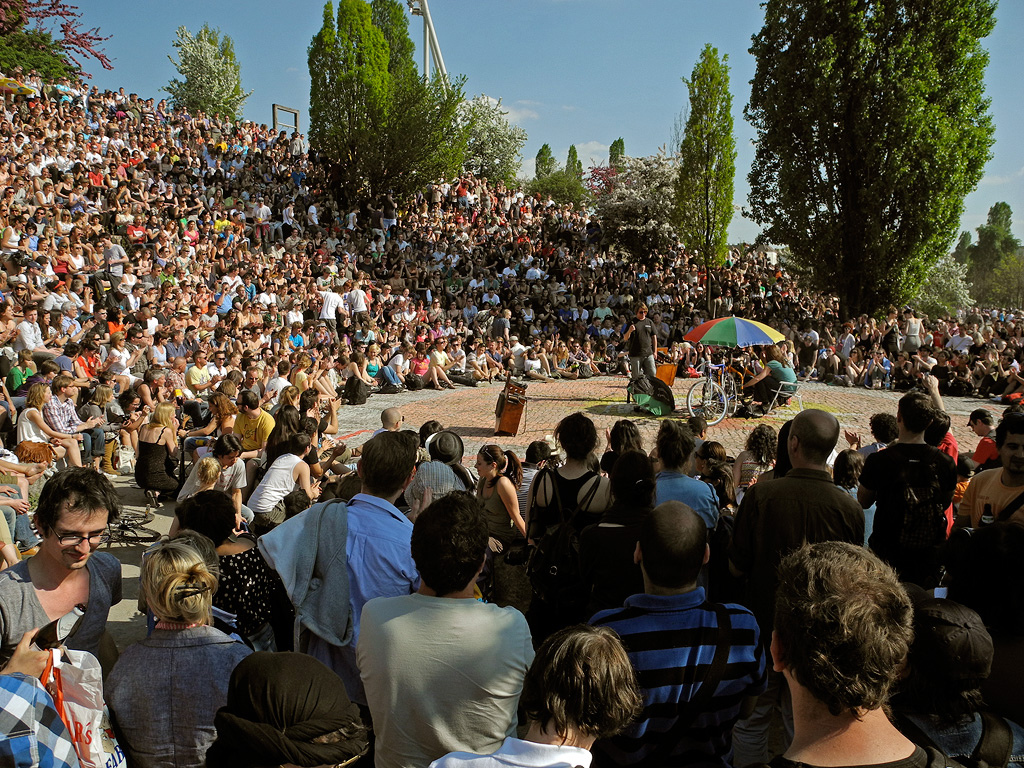
Open Air Karaoke at Mauerpark

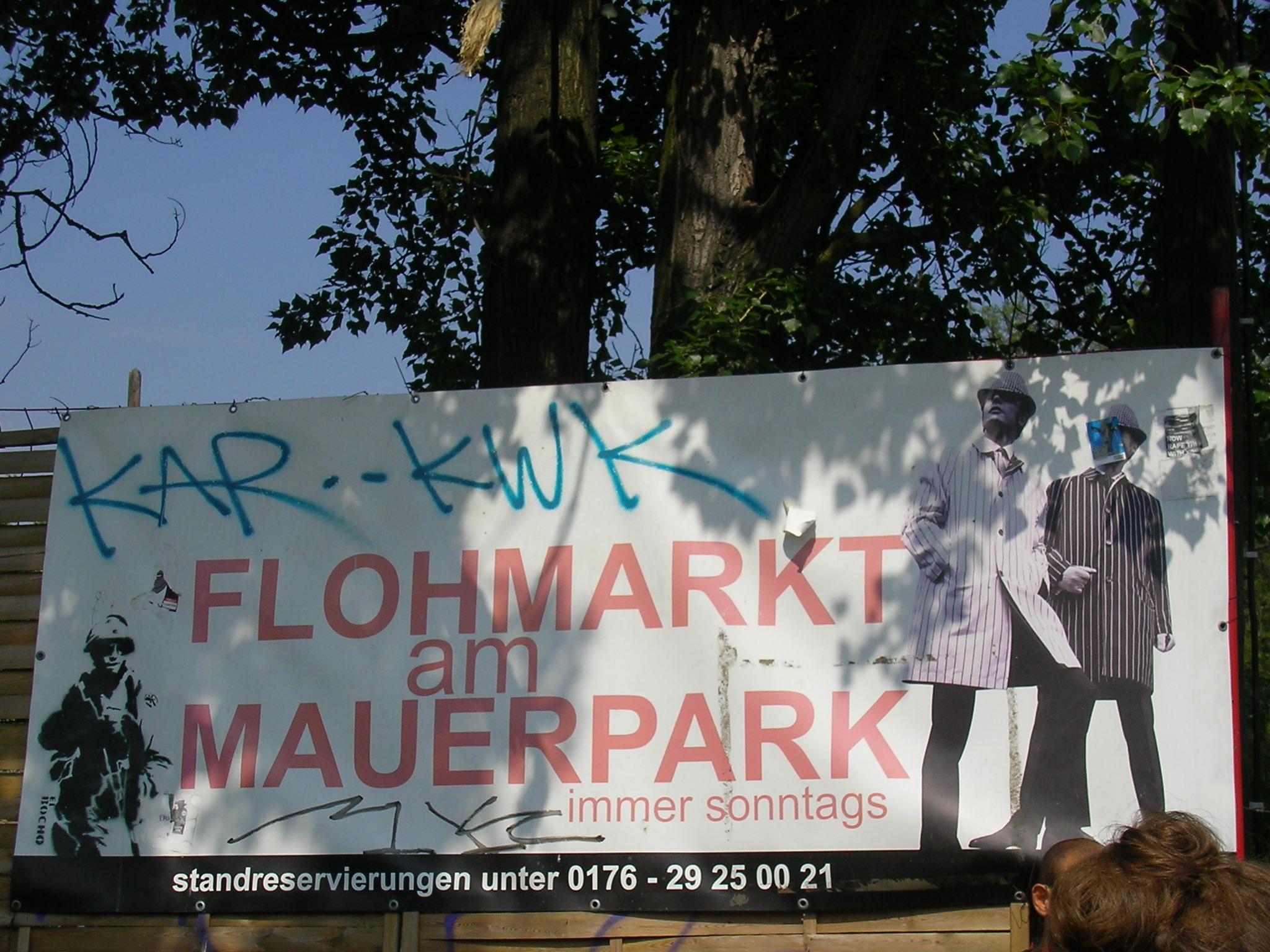
Flea market of MauerPark

After the fall of the Berlin Wall in 1989, the former death strip was designated as a public space and one of several green spaces in the city by local residents. With a contribution of DM 4.5 million from the Allianz environmental fund, the park was built on the eastern half of the former train station. However, the western half, which still belonged to the Bundeseisenbahnvermögen real estate association, remained a trade area and since 2004 has served as the location for a flea market next to the park. Several attempts to attach the western part to the green space have so far failed.

Today the park is one of the most popular places for young residents of Berlin, especially from the fashionable district of Prenzlauer Berg, and attracts basketball players, jugglers, musicians, and many other types of people. It is a crowded leisure ground and a site of sustainable improvised nightlife, especially in the summer, and has also become notorious for Walpurgis Night riots in recent years. There are two stadiums next to the park, including Friedrich-Ludwig-Jahn-Sportpark and Max-Schmeling-Halle, home to several of Berlin's local sports teams.

An 800 m strip of the Berlin Wall still stands in the park today as a monument, and is a popular place for graffiti artists to paint and display their work.

The park has been expanded in several phases since its establishment; construction is underway to bring the park to a total of 15 hectares (37 acres), with construction scheduled to be completed in 2019.

== Culture ==
=== Bearpit Karaoke Show ===
A stone circular stage area with surrounding amphitheatre is situated on the hillside directly across from the park's basketball court. In late February 2009 an informal karaoke show took place there for the first time. Weather permitting, the "Bearpit Karaoke Show" at the amphitheatre has continued each year since then to be a regular fixture in the park on Sunday afternoons, with it possible to visit the shows from spring through to late autumn.

Rapidly becoming a Berlin institution, every Sunday afternoon thousands of people make their way to it. If the crowd loves the singer, they will sing and cheer along and make them feel like a star.

=== Flea market ===
Open every Sunday since 2004, Flohmarkt am Mauerpark (German for Mauerpark Flea Market) is popular with both locals and tourists alike. While a newcomer to the Berlin flea market scene, it is becoming a quick favorite. The loose grid stalls populate the western side of the park and offer a collection of new and vintage fashions, vinyl records, CDs, GDR memorabilia and antiques, bicycles and other nicknacks.
