= Andra Långgatan =

Street in Gothenburg, Sweden

Coordinates: 57°41′56.30″N 11°56′48.00″E

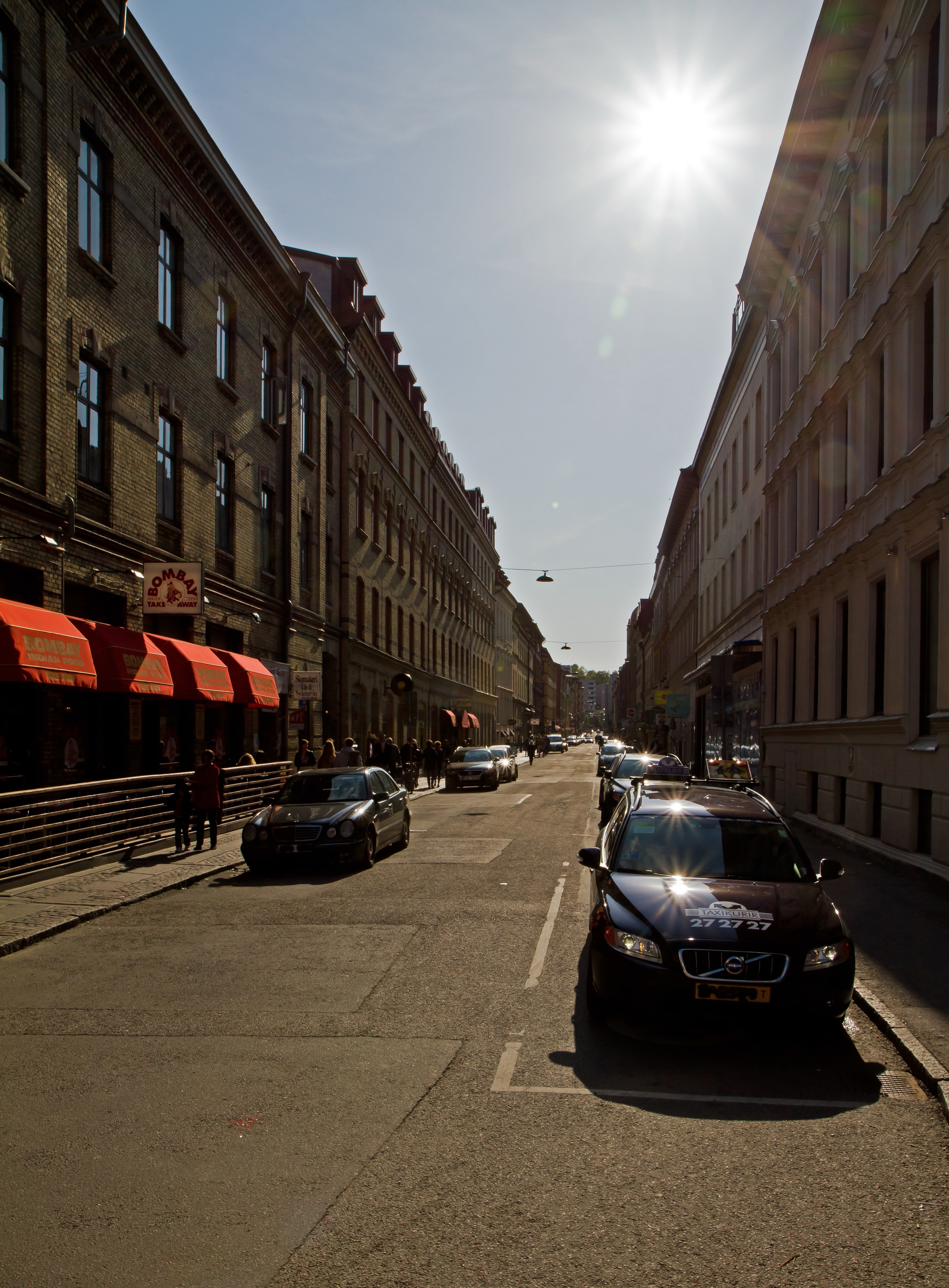
Andra långgatan in May 2011.

Andra Långgatan (English: Second Long Street) is a road in Gothenburg, Sweden. Located near the city's Haga District, it spans between Järntorget and Masthuggstorget. The street is home to a range of independent businesses including restaurants, bars, galleries and record shops, and has become a well-known hub for alternative culture and nightlife within the city. Andra Långgatan is part of the Långgatorna, which The Guardian named as the "coolest neighbourhood in Europe" in 2020.
