= Rue de Berne =

Street in Geneva, Switzerland

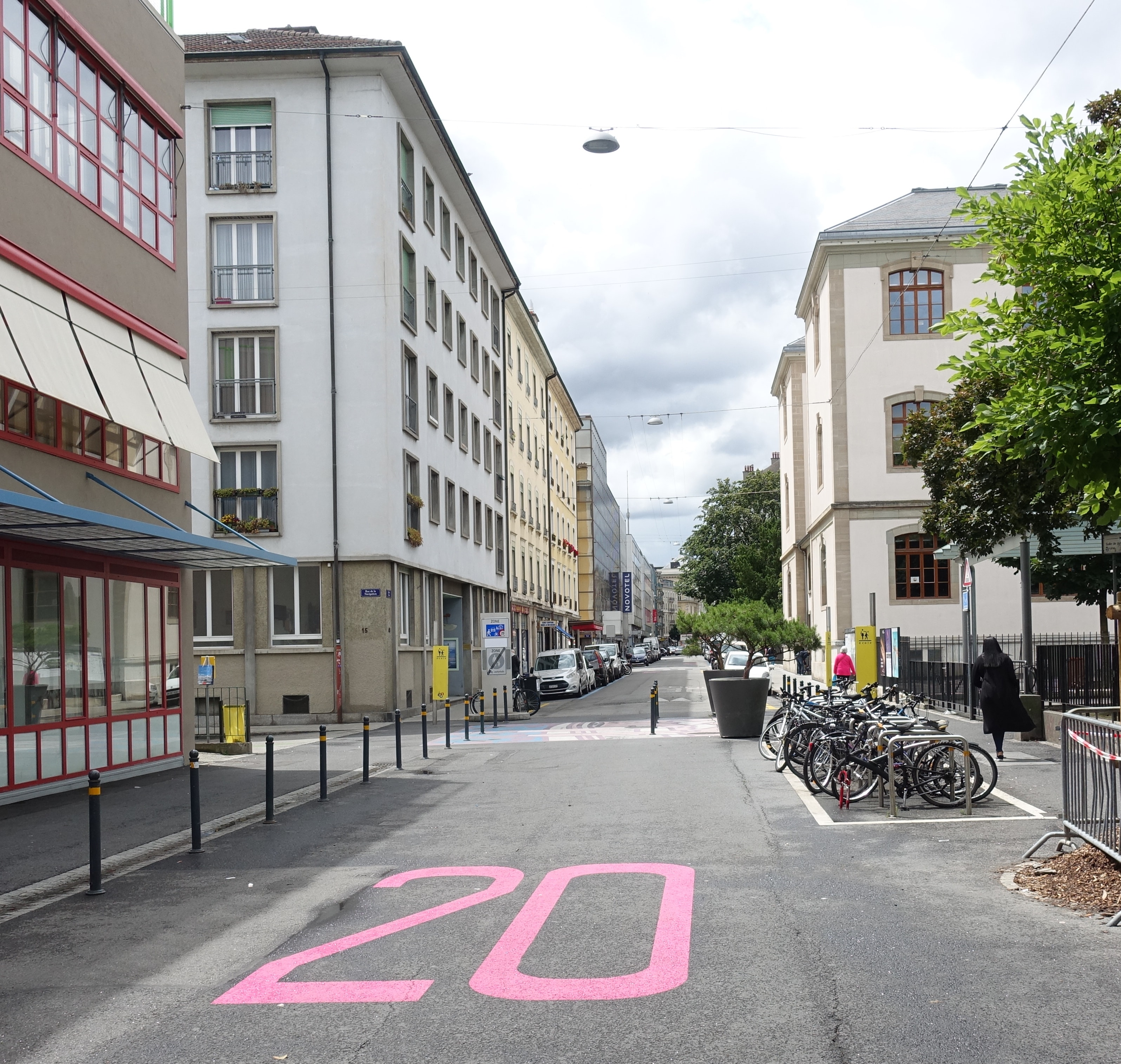
Rue de Berne in 2020

Rue de Berne is a street situated in down town Geneva, Switzerland, located in the popular and multicultural quarter of Les Pâquis on the right bank (Rive droite) of the Lake Geneva and the Rhone, near the railway station of Cornavin. Les Pâquis are known for night life, cafés and is the most multi-cultural part of Geneva.

La rue de Berne has several restaurants, bars, hotels, cabarets, brothels and sex shops. Several Arab, Turkish, Chinese, Portuguese, Thai, Indian, Italian and Swiss restaurants are spread in and around the street making it one of the best places in Geneva for dining out. It is known as "the hip part of town".

== In arts and literature ==
The 2003 novel of writer Paulo Coelho, Eleven Minutes, is set on this street.

The Arsène Lupin story "The Red Silk Scarf" by Maurice Leblanc is partly set on this street.

== See also ==
- Rue de Berne (Paris), 8th arrondissement of Paris
