= 1861 in architecture =

The year 1861 in architecture involved some significant architectural event and new buildings.

== Buildings and structures ==
=== Buildings completed ===
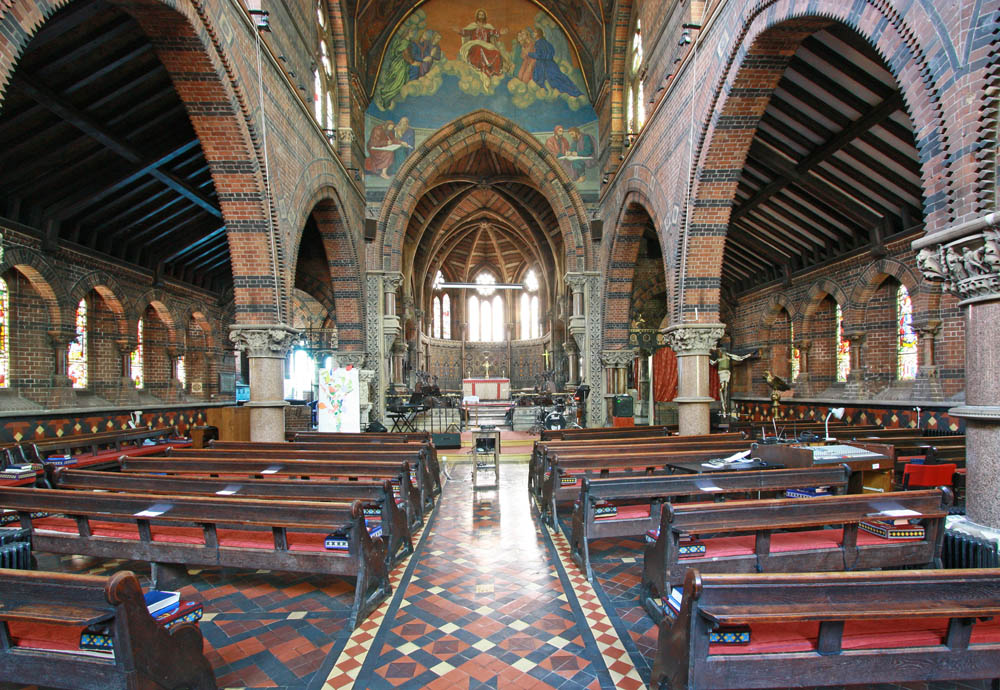
St James the Less, Pimlico

- Arlington Street Church in Boston, Massachusetts, United States, designed by Arthur Gilman.
- St James the Less, Pimlico, London, designed by George Edmund Street.
- All Saints Notting Hill, London, designed by William White in 1852.
- St. Michael's Church, Berlin, designed by August Soller (who is buried here) in 1845 and completed by Richard Lucae (his nephew), Andreas Simons and Martin Gropius.
- Tromsø Cathedral, Norway, designed by Christian Heinrich Grosch.
- Palácio do Grão-Pará, Petrópolis, Brazil, designed by Theodore Marx with de Araújo Porto Alegre.
- Mary Birdsall House in Richmond, Indiana.

== Awards ==
- RIBA Royal Gold Medal – Jean-Baptiste Lesueur.
- Grand Prix de Rome, architecture: Constant Moyaux.

== Births ==
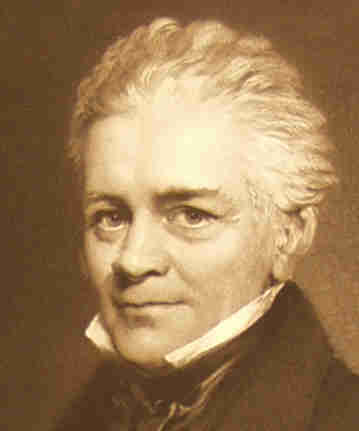
William Cubitt

- January 6 – Victor Horta, Belgian architect and designer (died 1947)
- April 20 – Hermann Muthesius, German architect and writer on architecture (died 1927)
- July 17 – Horace Field, English architect (died 1948)
- September 2 – Arthur Beresford Pite, English architect (died 1934)

== Deaths ==
- May 15 – Benjamin Woodward, Irish architect (born 1816)
- October 13 – Sir William Cubitt, English civil engineer (born 1785)
