= Bust of Wilhelm Leuschner =

Sculpture in Berlin, Germany

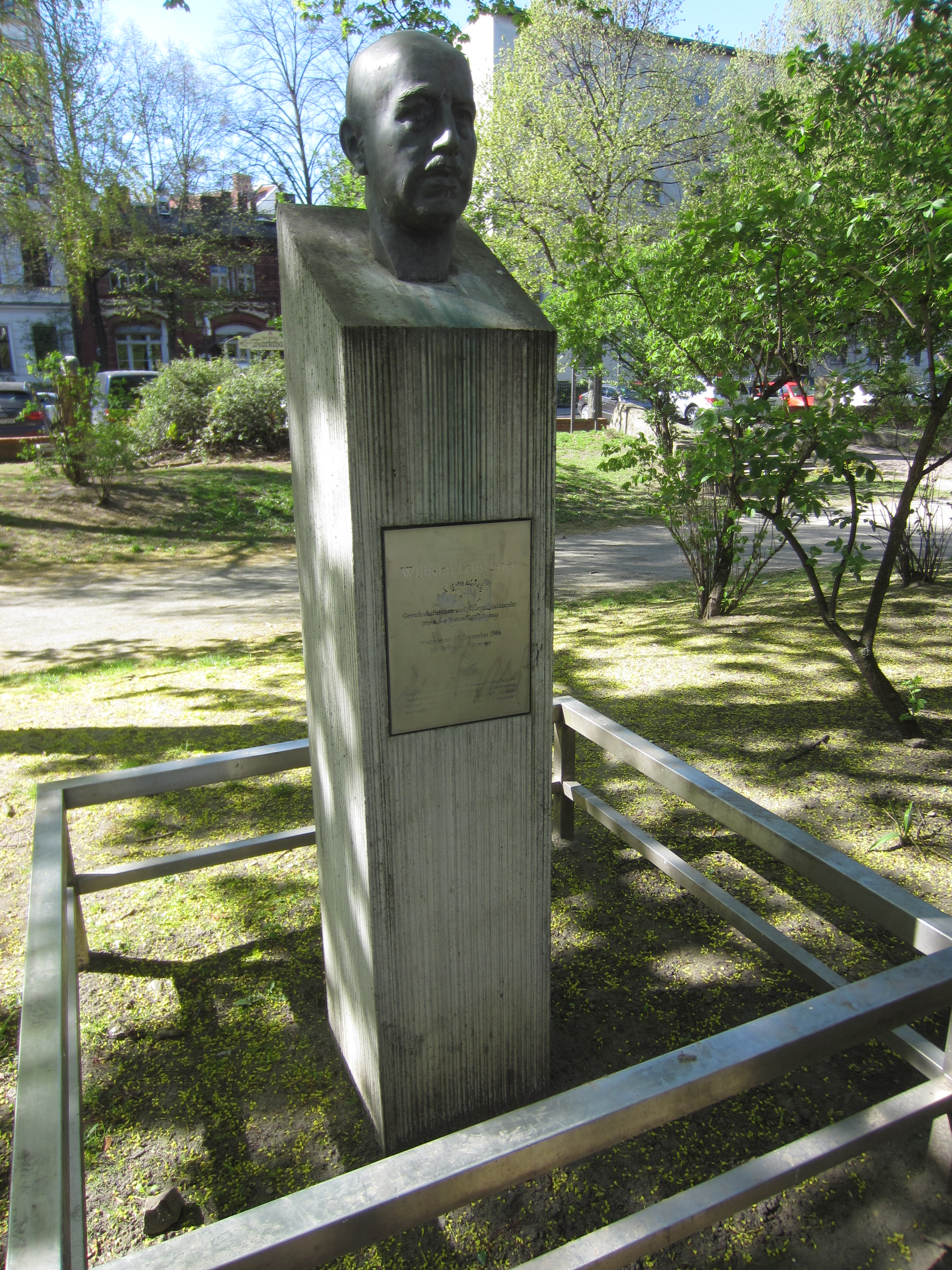
- The bust in 2016
- Subject: Wilhelm Leuschner
- Location: Kreuzberg, Berlin, Germany; 52°30′21″N 13°25′10″E

A bust of trade unionist and Social Democratic Party (SDP) politician Wilhelm Leuschner is installed along Leuschnerdamm in Kreuzberg, Berlin, Germany. The street also hosts a bust of fellow trade unionist and SPD member Carl Legien.
