= August Soller =

German architect

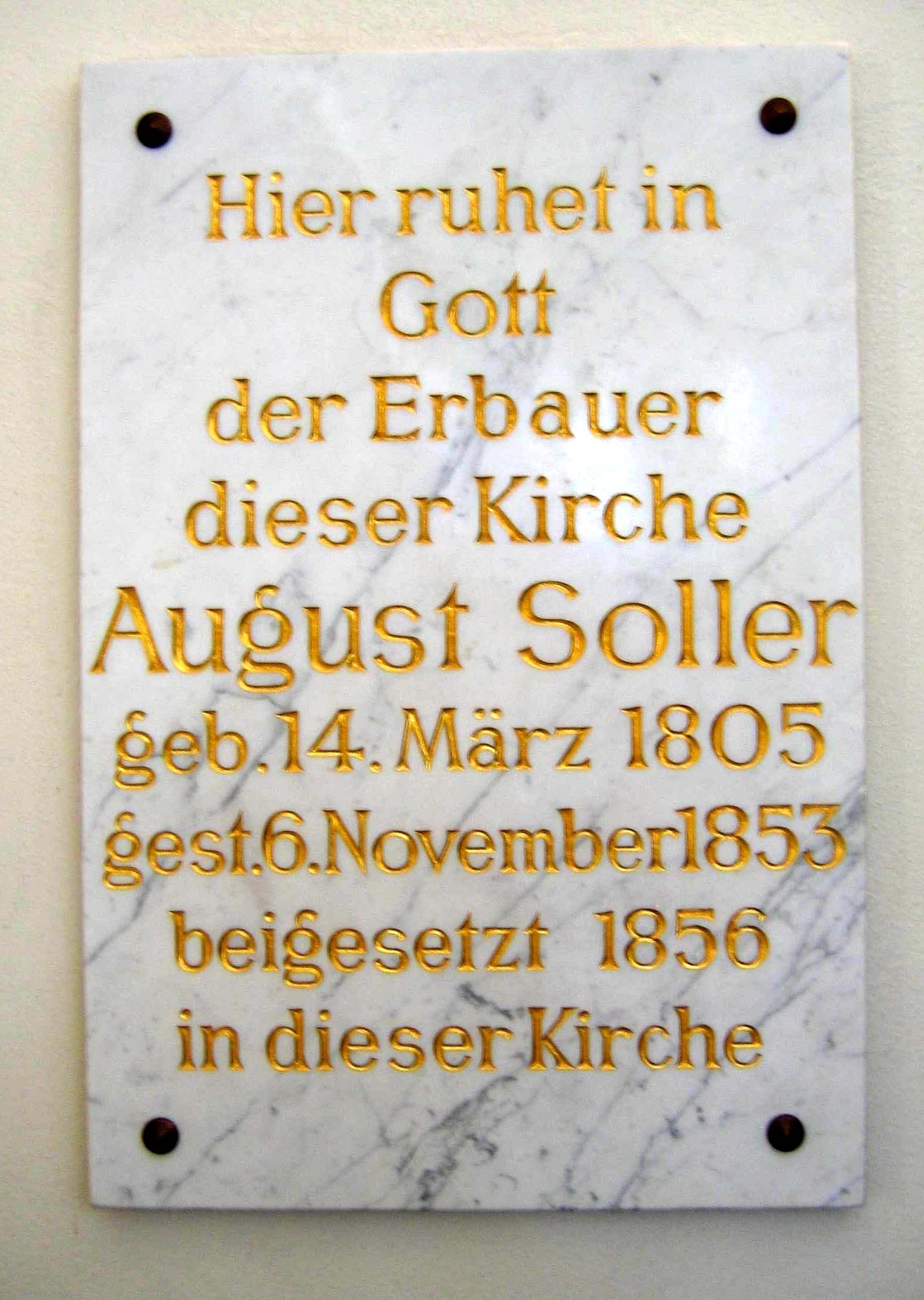
- Soller's grave inscription at Saint Michael's Church, Berlin, 1856
- Born: Johann August Karl Soller; 14 March 1805; Erfurt, Principality of Erfurt
- Died: 6 November 1853 (aged 48); Berlin, Kingdom of Prussia
- Education: Bauakademie
- Occupation: Architect
- Spouse: Friederike Wilhelmine
- Children: 8
- Buildings: Luisenstädtische Kirche; St. Michael's Church, Berlin

Johann August Karl Soller (14 March 1805 – 6 November 1853) was a Prussian architect. He was one of the most important of Karl Friedrich Schinkel's pupils and is regarded as a representative of the Schinkel school. Soller became an influential proponent of Rundbogenstil, a Romanesque Revival architectural style that became popular in German-speaking lands and among German diaspora during the 19th century.

== Life and work ==
August Soller was born in Erfurt, Principality of Erfurt, in 1805. He worked as a land surveyor from 1820–1822 and completed his surveyor's examination on June 22, 1822 at the E. S. Unger Mathematical Institute. Soller then completed two and a half years of practical experience as a building inspector. To prepare for his master builder's examination, he moved to Berlin and lived with the family of his nephew Richard Lucae.

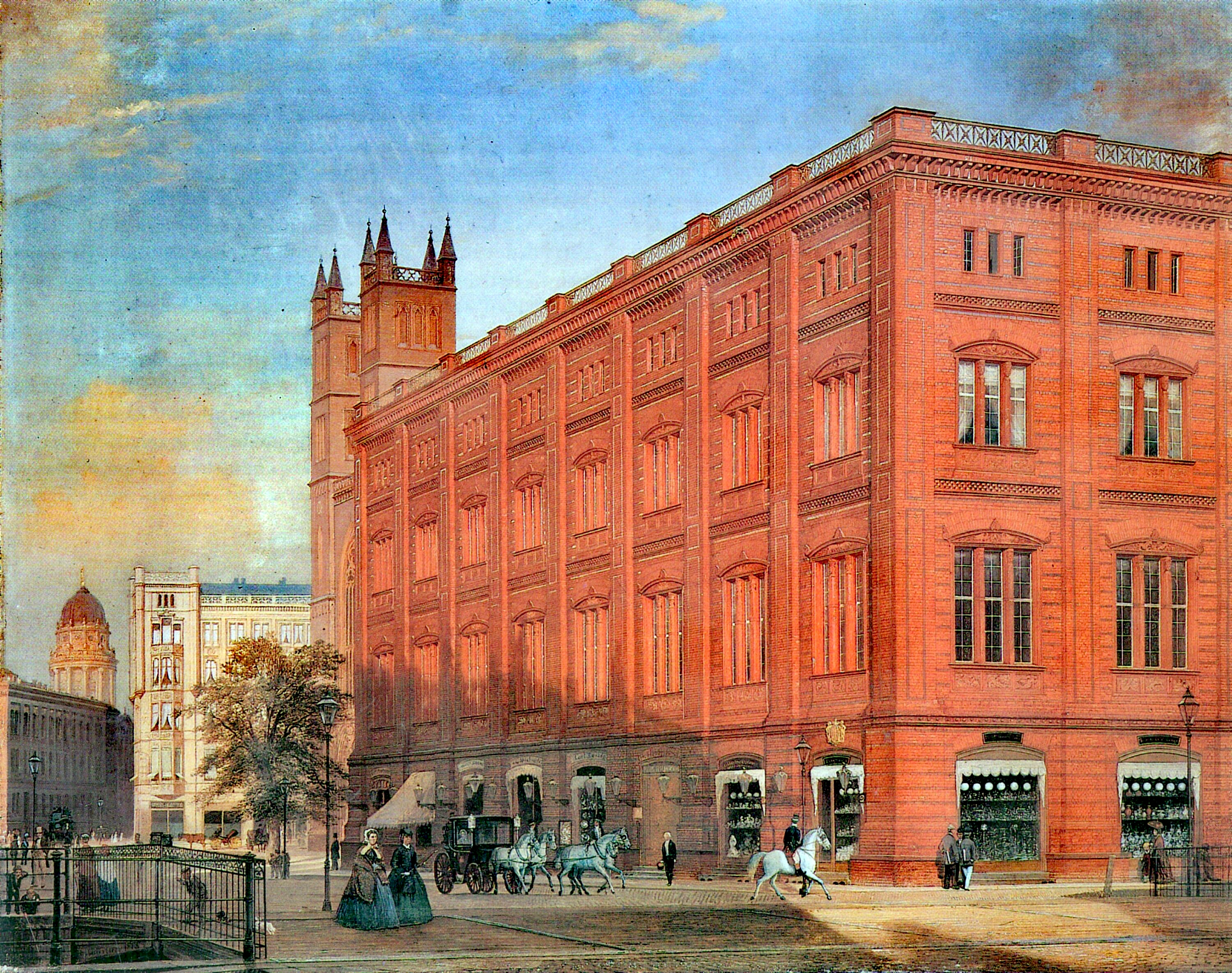
The Bauakademie in Berlin, where Soller studied under Karl Schinkel

In 1829 Soller was licensed as a Prussian state architect. He then served in the provinces, particularly in the Province of Silesia. From 1830 to 1833 he worked as a royal construction foreman for the District Government in Liegnitz and for a time served as a construction inspector in Posen. His focus became the design of churches and the supervision of their construction. On June 1, 1833, he became a master builder for the Prussian Higher Council of Architecture (German: Preußische Oberbaureputation) in Berlin and also became a member of the Berlin Academy of Architecture, known as the Bauakademie. During this period Soller was assistant to Karl Friedrich Schinkel, one of the most prominent architects in Germany. Soller took over the Department of Churches in the Construction Commission in 1841, and in 1843 was made Senior Privy Councillor (German: Geheimer Oberbaurat) for Infrastructure. From 1851 onwards he served as Lead Councillor for construction in the Prussian Ministry of Trade.

His first completely independent work was the nearly three meter high tomb of General Ernst Ludwig von Tippelskirch in the Alter Garnisonfriedhof) in Berlin (1844). Soller also designed Berlin's second oldest Catholic Church constructed after the Reformation, the almost forgotten church St. Marien am Behnitz in Spandau (1848). In 2002 that church was transferred into private ownership and completely renovated. He led construction of the Invalidensäule war monument in Berlin's Invalidenpark (1851–1853) and designed the tower of the Luisenstädtische Kirche. As a curator of monuments, Soller was also involved in the construction of Cologne Cathedral and the restoration of Erfurt Cathedral and the Cathedral of Trier.

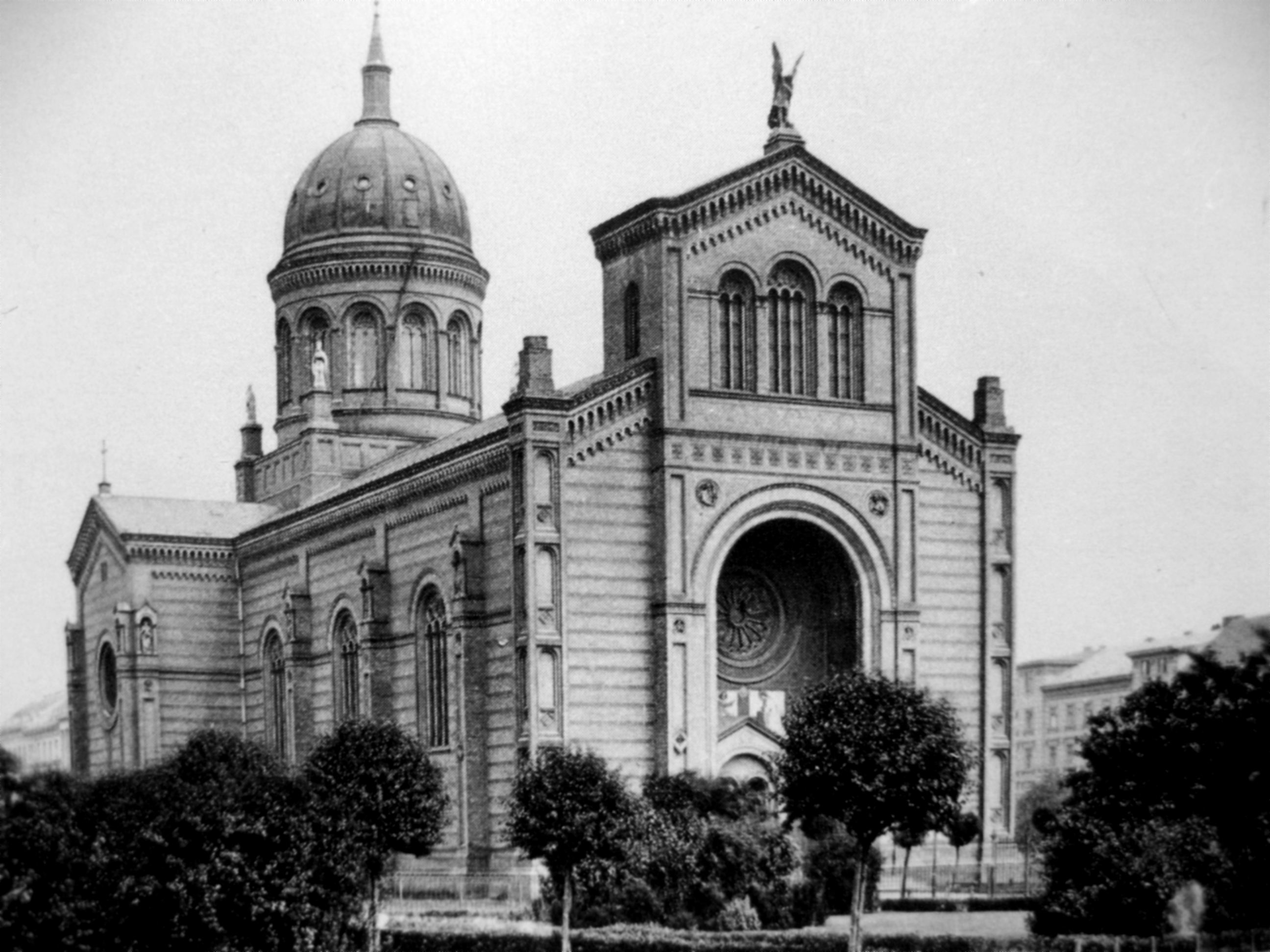
St. Michael's Church, Berlin in 1880

Soller's most important work is St. Michael's Church, Berlin (German: Sankt-Michael-Kirche), the parish church of St. Michael and the city's third oldest Catholic church built after the Reformation. It was constructed between 1851–1861 to plans Soller had already completed in 1845 and occupies a dramatic position on the Luisenstadt Canal. After his early death in 1853, church financial difficulties then caused a break in construction in 1855. Soller was buried there in 1856 and the building was finally completed in 1861 by Andreas Simons, Martin Gropius and particularly Soller's nephew, Richard Lucae. The church was consecrated on the 28 October 1861, by the Bishop of Breslau in the presence of the King of Prussia, William I, the future Emperor of Germany.

== Legacy ==
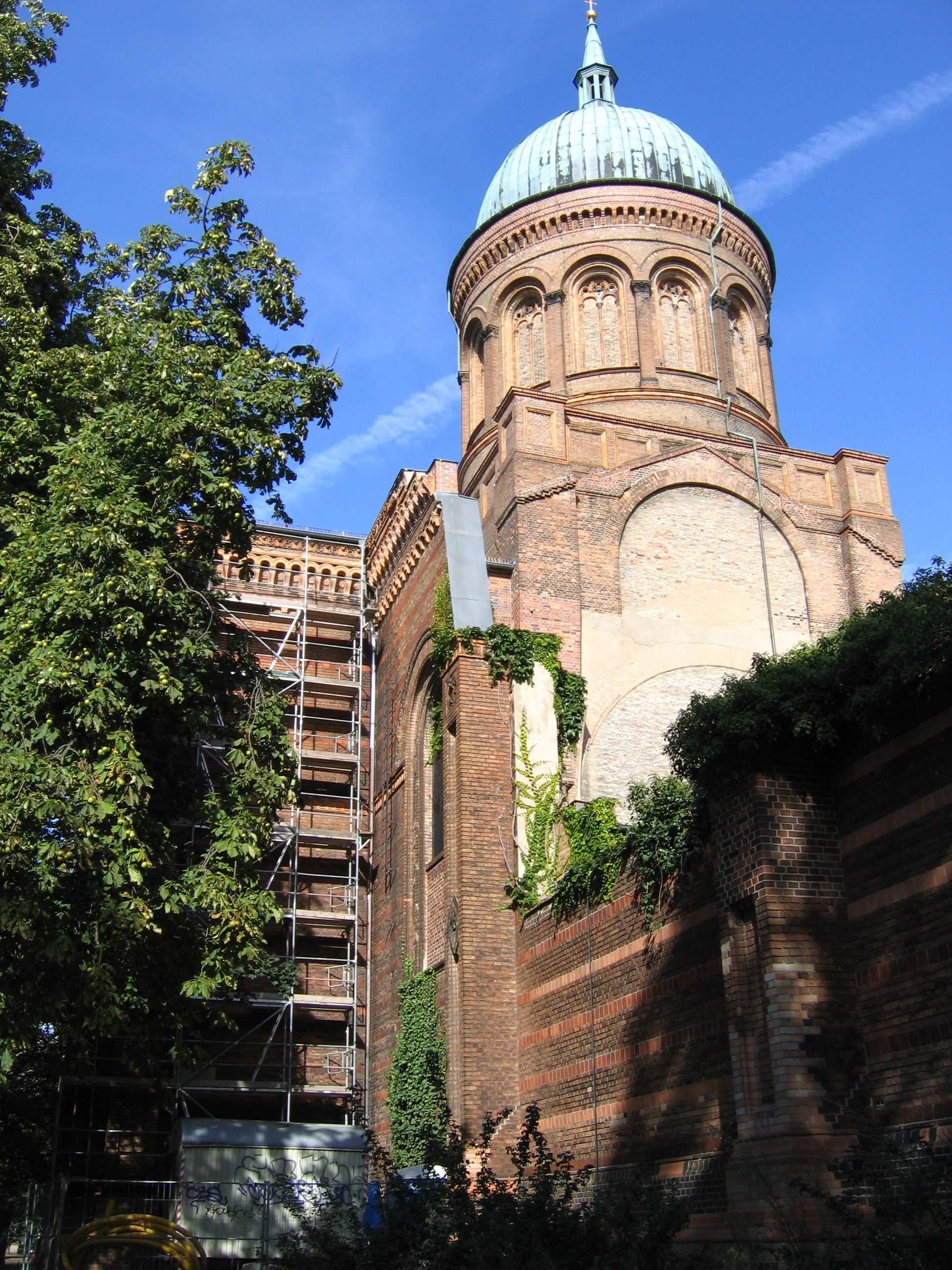
St. Michael's Church, Berlin, showing partially restored damage from World War II

Since his health was poor and he died at only 48 years old, Soller's oeuvre is not as extensive as it might have been. His designs for the spire of the Jerusalemer Kirche (1837) and the Petri- und Markuskirche (1844), for instance, were never carried out. However, he is regarded as the best among the state architects of the period. He sought neither fame nor honors, instead dedicating himself to principles of sound architectural design.

As Soller's work became known through publications, it influenced American architects Richard M. Upjohn and James Renwick Jr. in the mid-1840s, effectively initiating a Romanesque revival in the United States. Soller's work also influenced Miklós Ybl, one of Europe's leading architects and Hungary's most influential during the mid to late 19th century.

A number of Soller's significant works were damaged in World War II and demolished in its aftermath. St. Michael's was heavily damaged on the night of Feb 3, 1945 during the bombing of Berlin. It was stabilized and partially restored between 1948 and 1953, with the installation of a worship space in the transept. More repair and restoration work continued between 1976 and 1998, although the front façade and nave remain a ruin. The Invalidensäule survived the war without significant damage, but it became overshadowed by more pressing events surrounding the Berlin Blockade. It was demolished by the city on August 19, 1948. The Luisenstädtische Kirche burnt during the bombings of February 3, 1945, with Soller's west tower still standing. However, by 1961 the church's ruins were located in the boundary strip of the Berlin Wall and it too was demolished in 1964. The foundations still remain in the former cemetery, which is now a park.

== Gallery ==
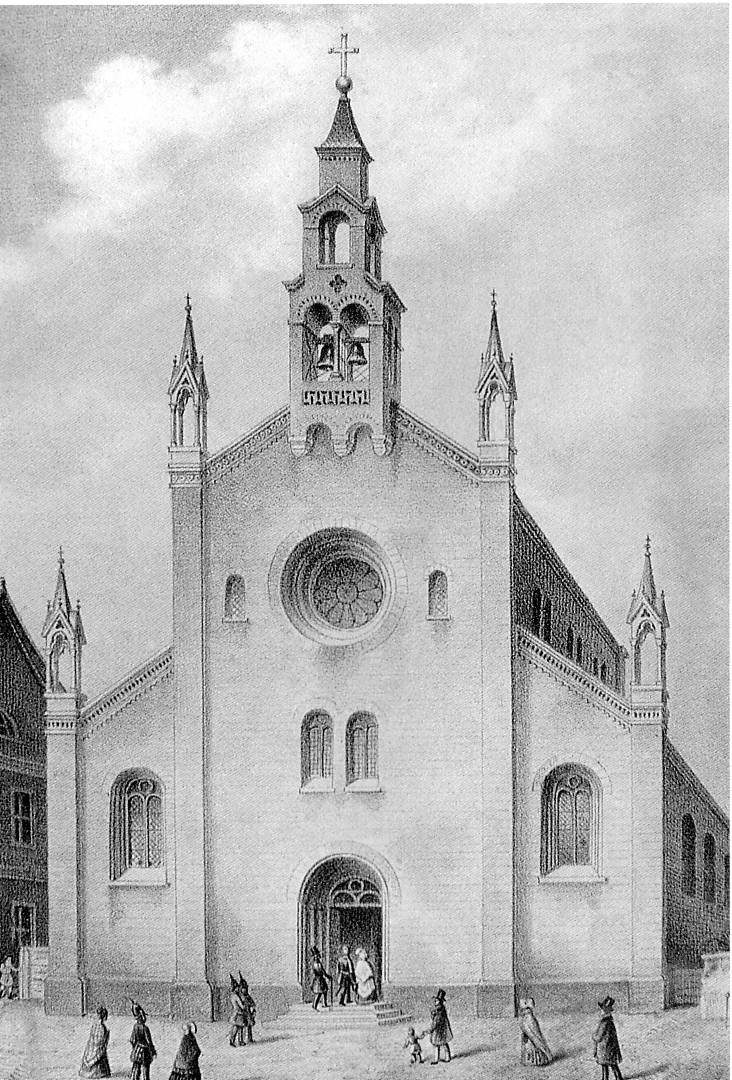
Church of St. Marien am Behnitz, Berlin-Spandau (1848)

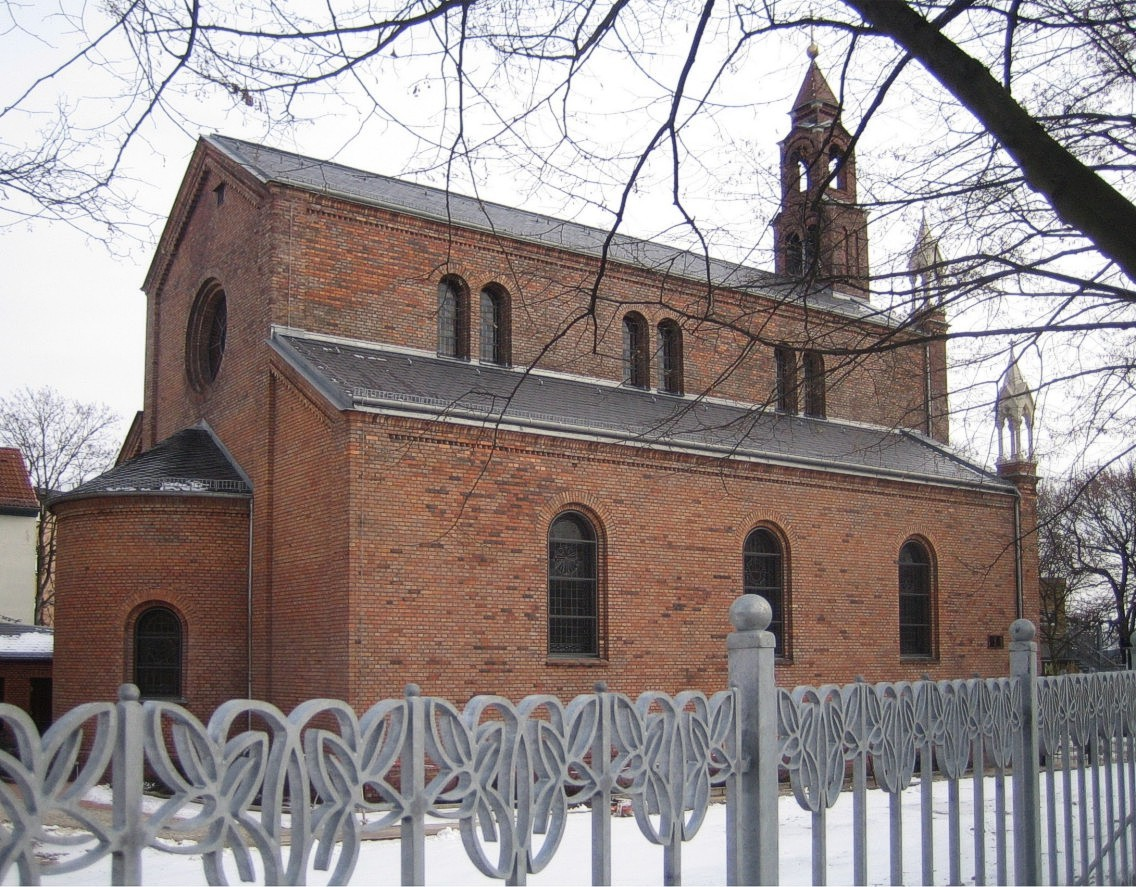
Church of St. Marien am Behnitz as restored in 2006

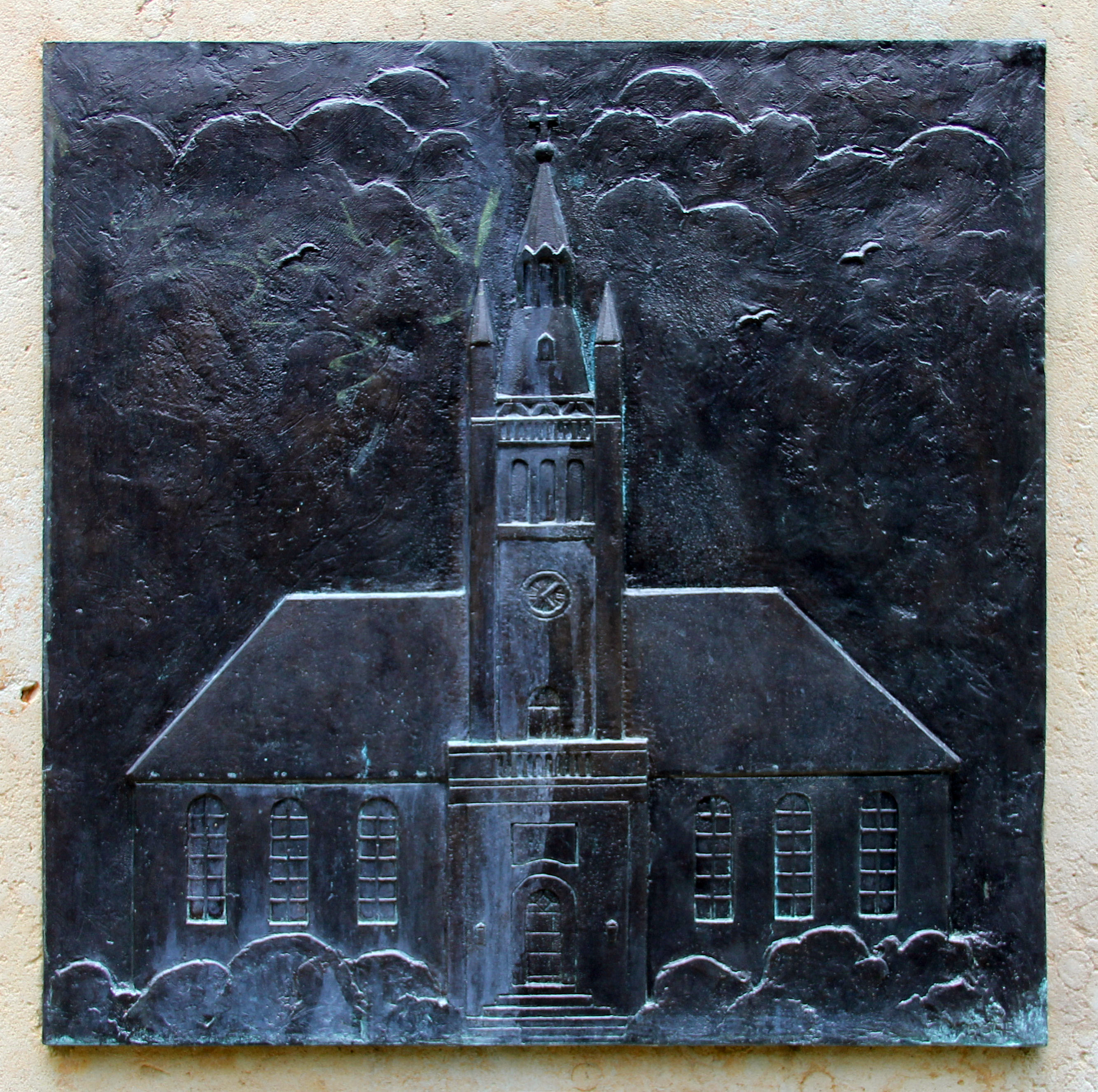
Luisenstädtische Kirche (1845), memorial plaque at the site

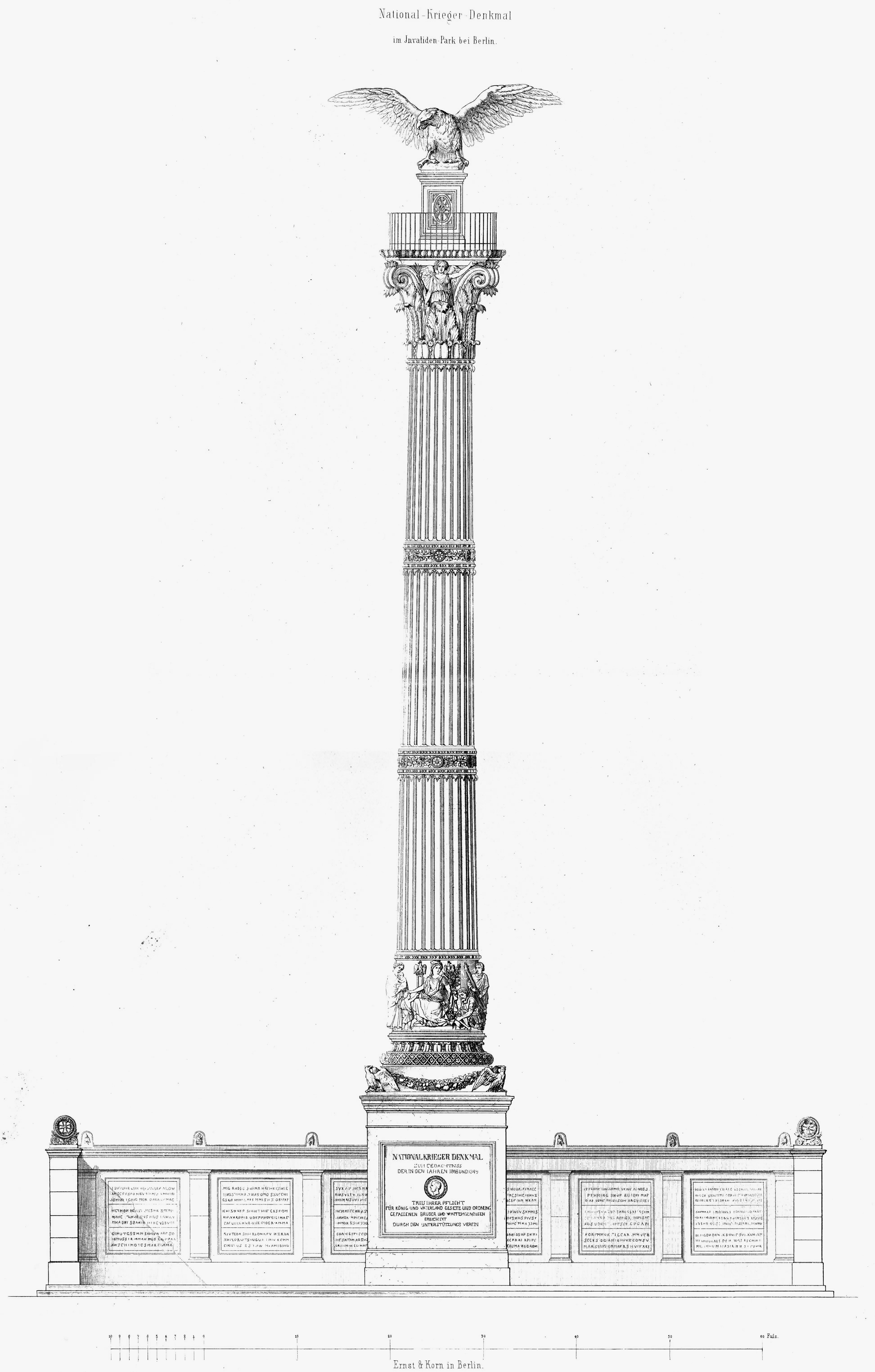
Invalidensäule (1853), front elevation

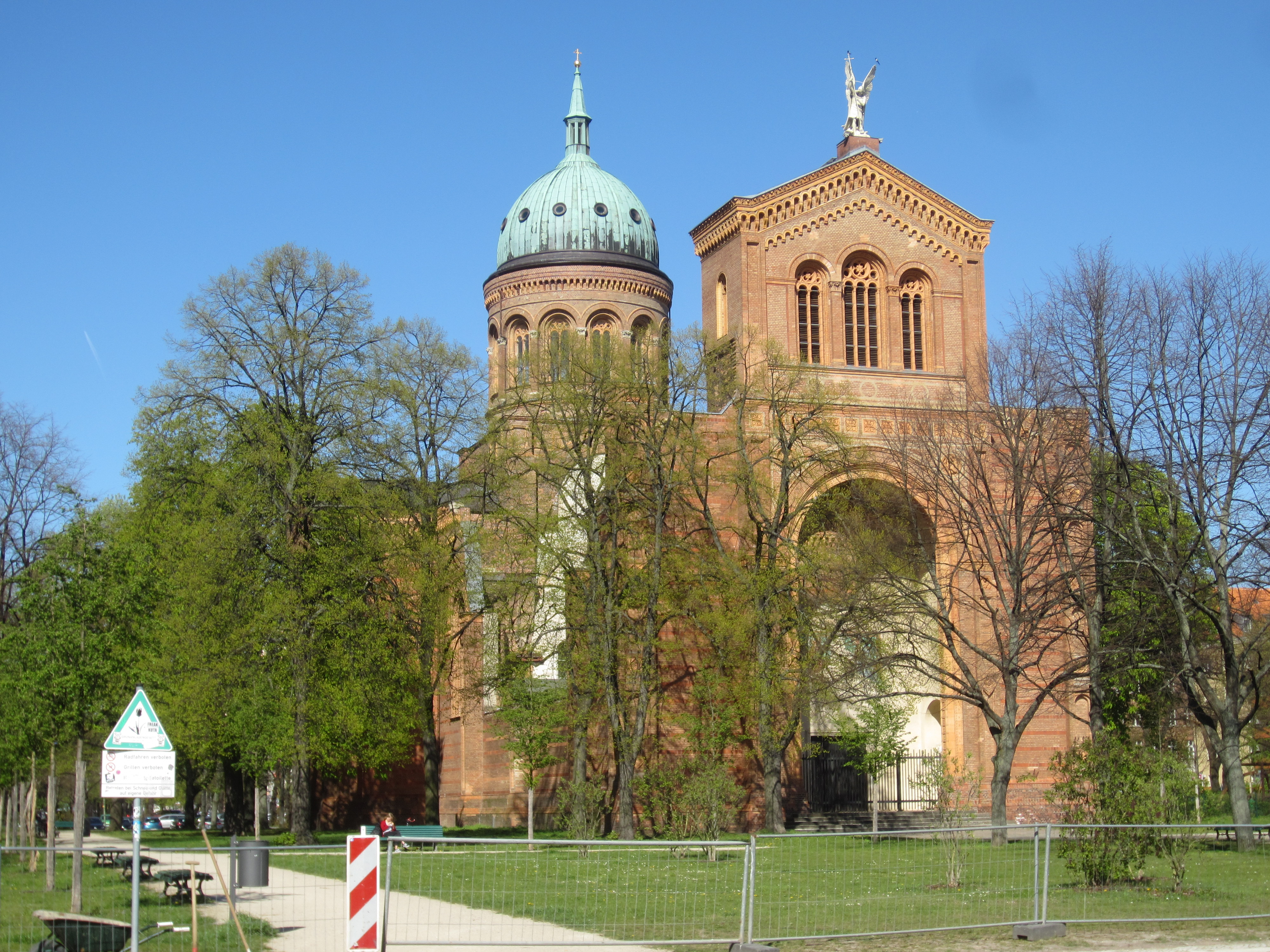
St. Michael's Church, Berlin

== Writings ==
- Soller, August: Entwürfe zu Kirchen, Pfarr- und Schul-Häusern zum amtl. Gebr. bearb. u. hrsg. von der Kgl. Preuss. Ober-Bau-Deputation. Potsdam: Riegel Lfg. 1 (1844) bis Lfg. 13 (1855)
