= Legiendamm =

Street in Berlin, Germany

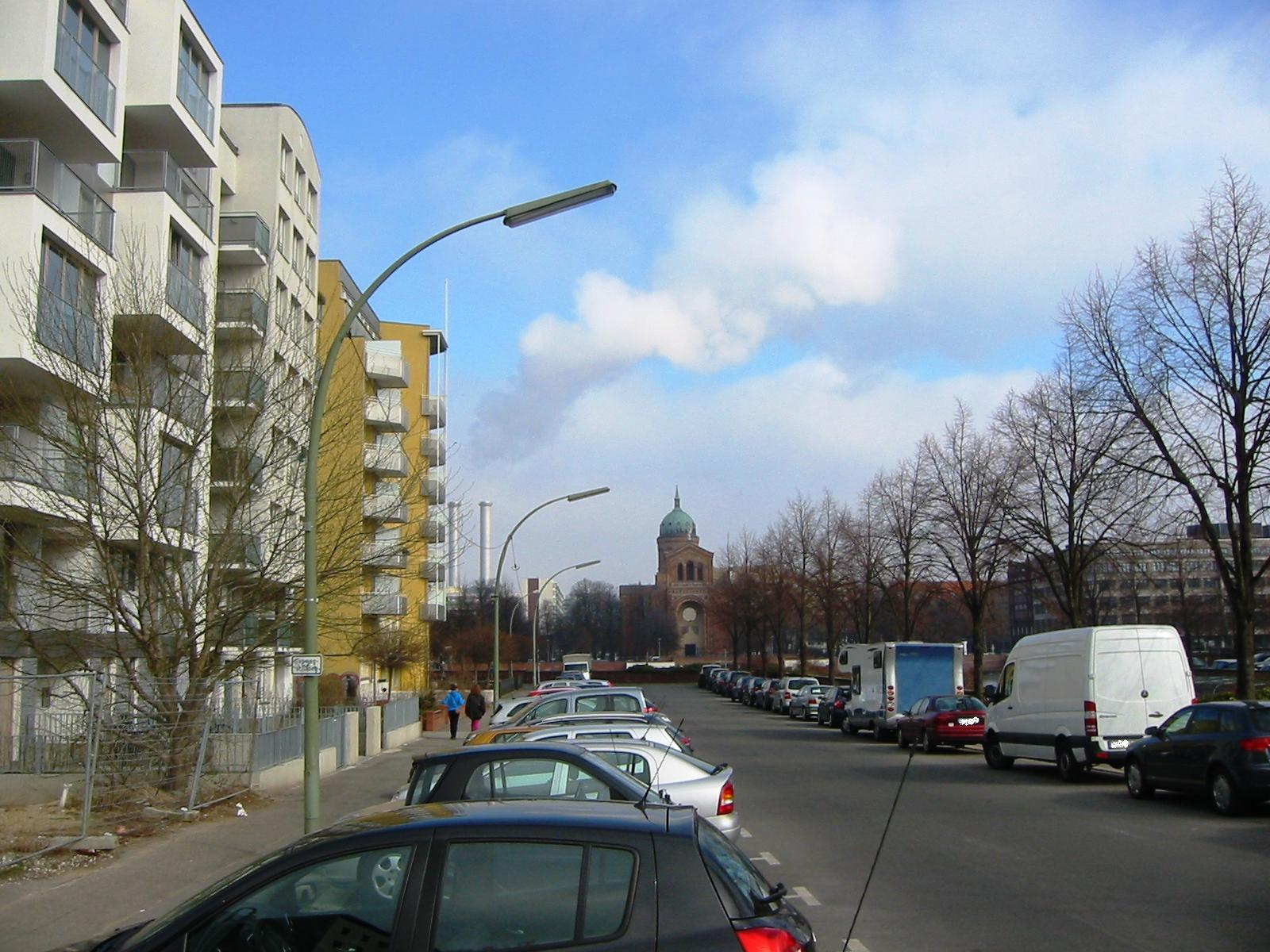
- Legiendamm in 2011
- Interactive map of Legiendamm
- Former names: Luisenufer; (1849–1937); Kösterdamm; (1937–1947)
- Namesake: Carl Legien
- Type: Street
- Location: Berlin, Germany
- Quarter: Mitte, Kreuzberg
- Nearest metro station: Moritzplatz
- Coordinates: 52°30′17″N 13°25′01″E
- North end: Michaelkirchplatz; Heinrich-Heine-Platz
- Major junctions: Waldemarstraße
- South end: Oranienplatz

Legiendamm is a street in Berlin, Germany. The street is parallel to Leuschnerdamm and borders an accumulation pond of the former Luisenstadt Canal. It is named after Carl Legien and was previously known as Luisenufer. Notable features include Markthalle VII and a bust of Carl Legien.
