= Luisenstädtische Kirche =

Coordinates: 52.5090°N 13.4073°E

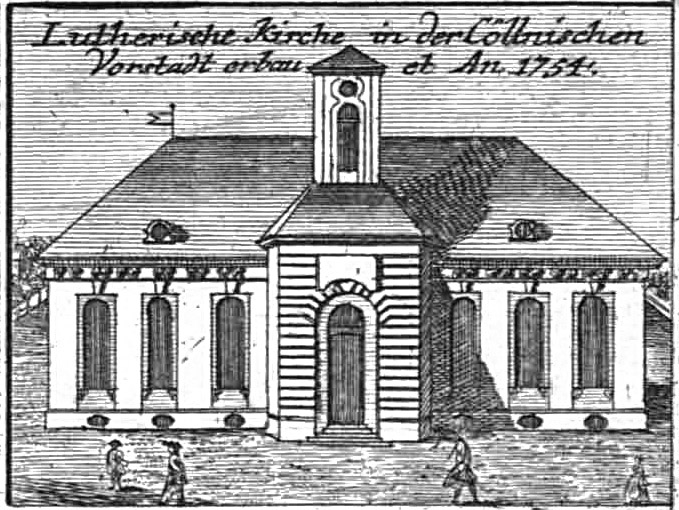
Luisenstädtische Kirche in 1757, then still called Kirche in der Cöllnischen Vorstadt.

The Luisenstädtische Kirche was a church building in Berlin, in the former Luisenstadt district (now part of the Berlin-Mitte and Friedrichshain-Kreuzberg districts), on Alte Jacobstraße between Sebastianstraße and Stallschreiberstraße. It was originally known as the Kirche in der Cöpenicker Vorstadt (church in the Köpenick suburb), then from 1785 to 1795 as the Köllnische Vorstadtkirche (Cöllnian suburb church), then from 1795 to 1837 as the Sebastiankirche, after presbyter and city-councillor Sebastian Nethe, taking its final name in 1837.

== History ==
The first church on the site was a simple half-timbered Baroque building designed by Martin Grünberg and constructed in 1694–95, when the outside the Köpenick Gate became a parish of its own. This quickly became dilapidated and was demolished for a new building on the same site, built from 1751 to 1753 and designed by Christian August Naumann (died after 1757) and Johann Gottfried Büring (1723 and after 1788). The church was 40m long with a 15.75 wide, with a rectangular hall-nave, arched windows and a high hipped roof brick on four sides, with entrances located under the tower and on the two narrow sides. The pulpit and altar faced the tower entrance, in front of the font and on the east side of the organ. The Köpenick suburb was renamed Luisenstadt in honour of Queen Louise of Mecklenburg-Strelitz in 1802, leading to the church being renamed the Luisenstädtische Kirche in 1837.

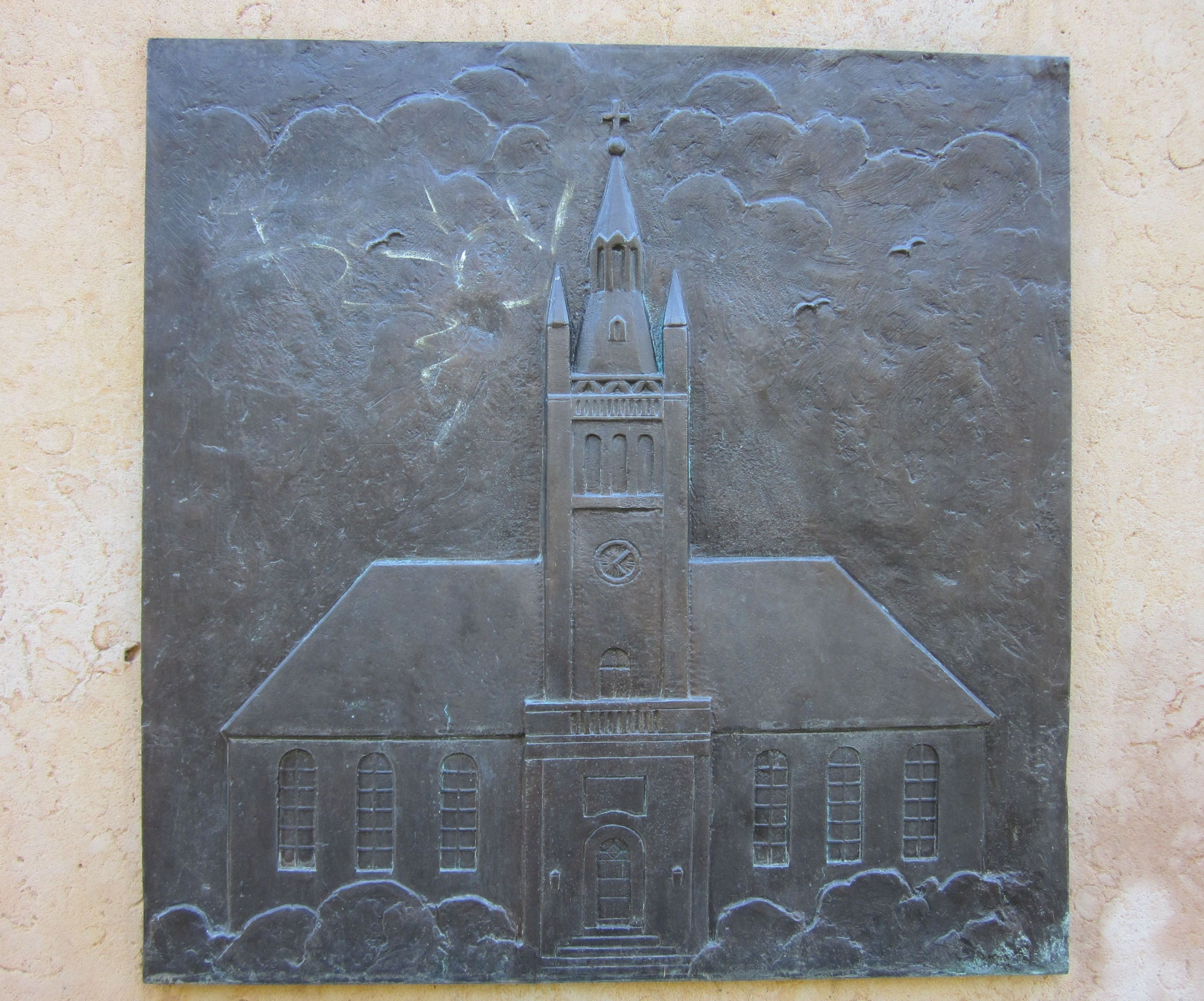
Luisenstädtische Kirche with its new tower, as given on the memorial stela on its former site.

In 1841 the wooden pillars supporting its gallery were replaced by cast zinc ones and the vestry, pulpit and organ renovated and enlarged, with a new west tower by August Soller completed four years later in 1845. The construction work was initially led by Wilhelm Berger (1790–1858), then by Friedrich August Stüler. The interior of the church was redesigned in 1891. On 3 February 1945 it was destroyed by Allied bombing of Berlin in World War II. When the Berlin Wall was built in 1961 the church's ruins stood in the boundary strip and it was proposed that the local community should fund a high wire fence and limestone wall put up around the ruins and the demolition of the upper levels of the tower.

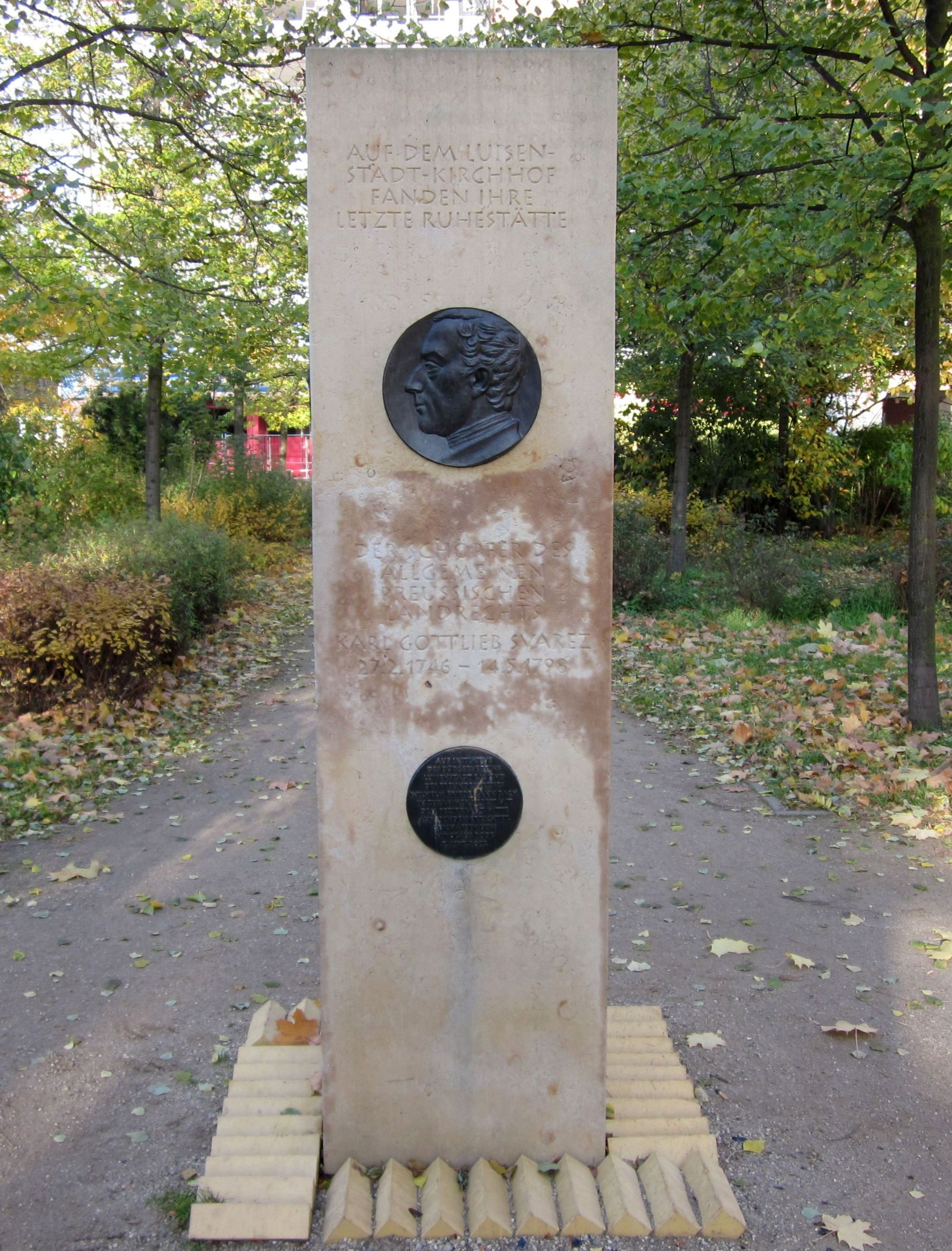
Memorial stela on the site of the church and cemetery

The community could not afford this and East Berlin's magistrate refused offers of financial help from West Berlin. Thus it was decided to demolish the ruins with the permission of the consistory of the Evangelical Church in Berlin-Brandenburg – since there was no chance of rebuilding a church only a few metres from the border – and to remove the surrounding cemetery. The demolition was carried out on 29 May 1964, though the foundations still remain in the former cemetery, which is now a park (the foundations and the graves are listed as an archaeological monument).

== Sources ==
- Media related to Luisenstädtische Kirche at Wikimedia Commons
- http://www.luise-berlin.de/lexikon/mitte/l/luisenstaedtische_kirche.htm
- https://web.archive.org/web/20110112084410/http://www.kkbs.de/1030618/
