= Luisenstadt =

- Quarter
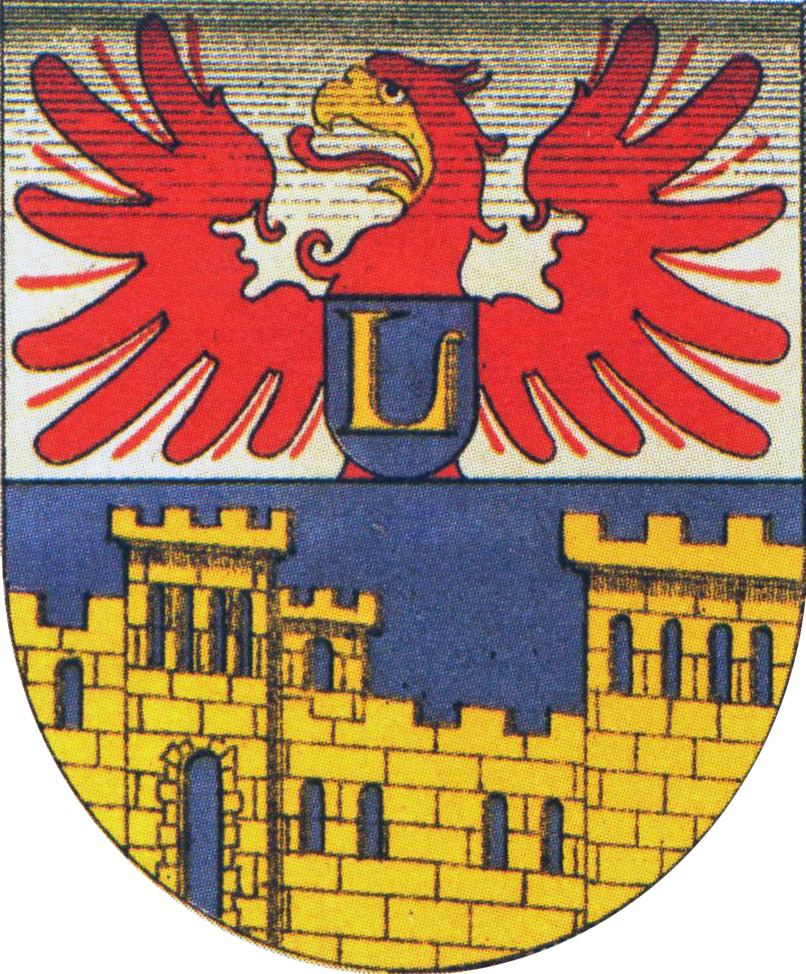
- Coat of arms

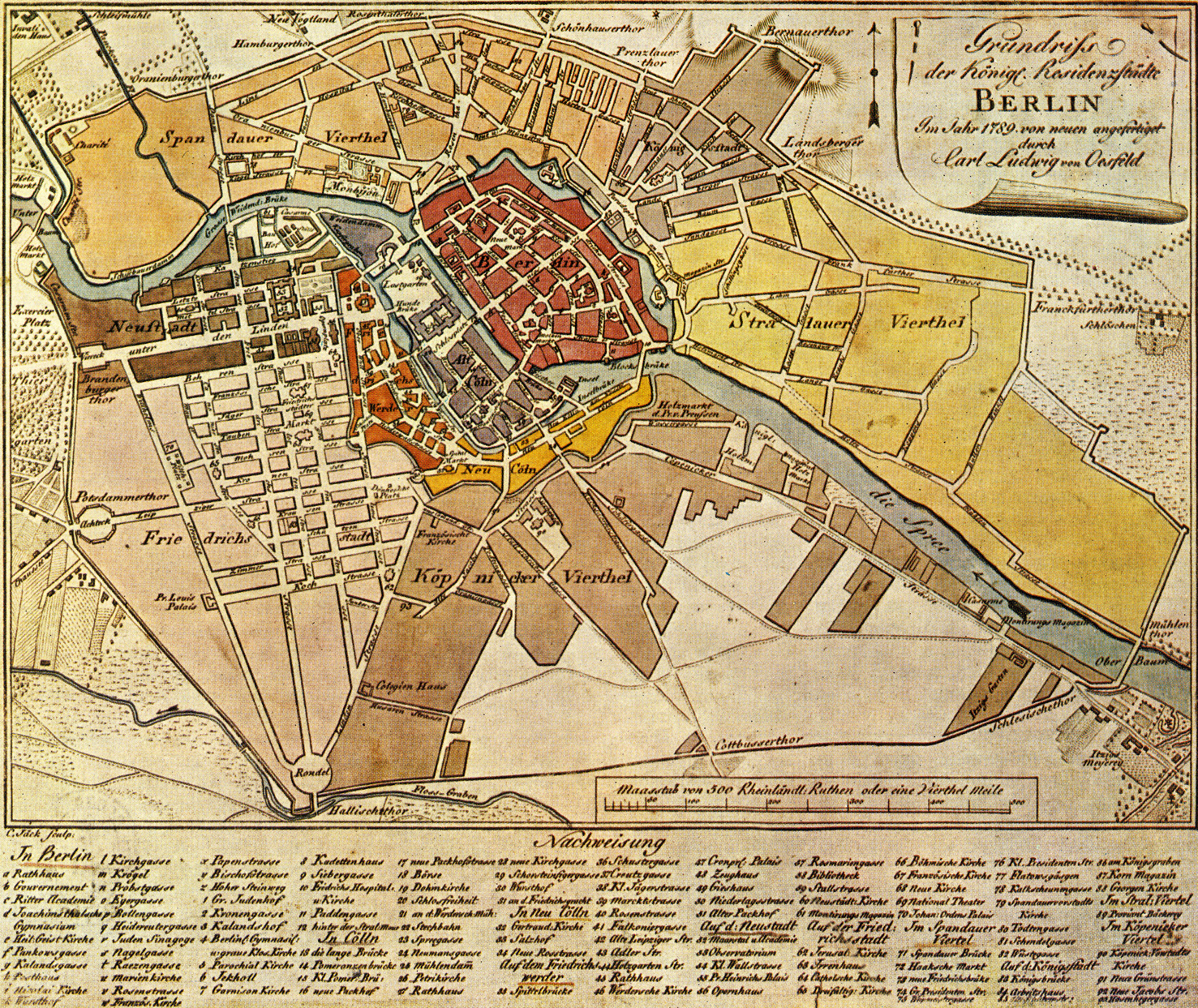
- Map of central Berlin in 1789 showing Luisenstadt in the right bottom
- Coordinates: 52°31′N 13°25′E
- Country: Germany
- City: Berlin
- Borough: Mitte and Friedrichshain-Kreuzberg
- Locality: Mitte and Kreuzberg
- Elevation: 34 m (112 ft)

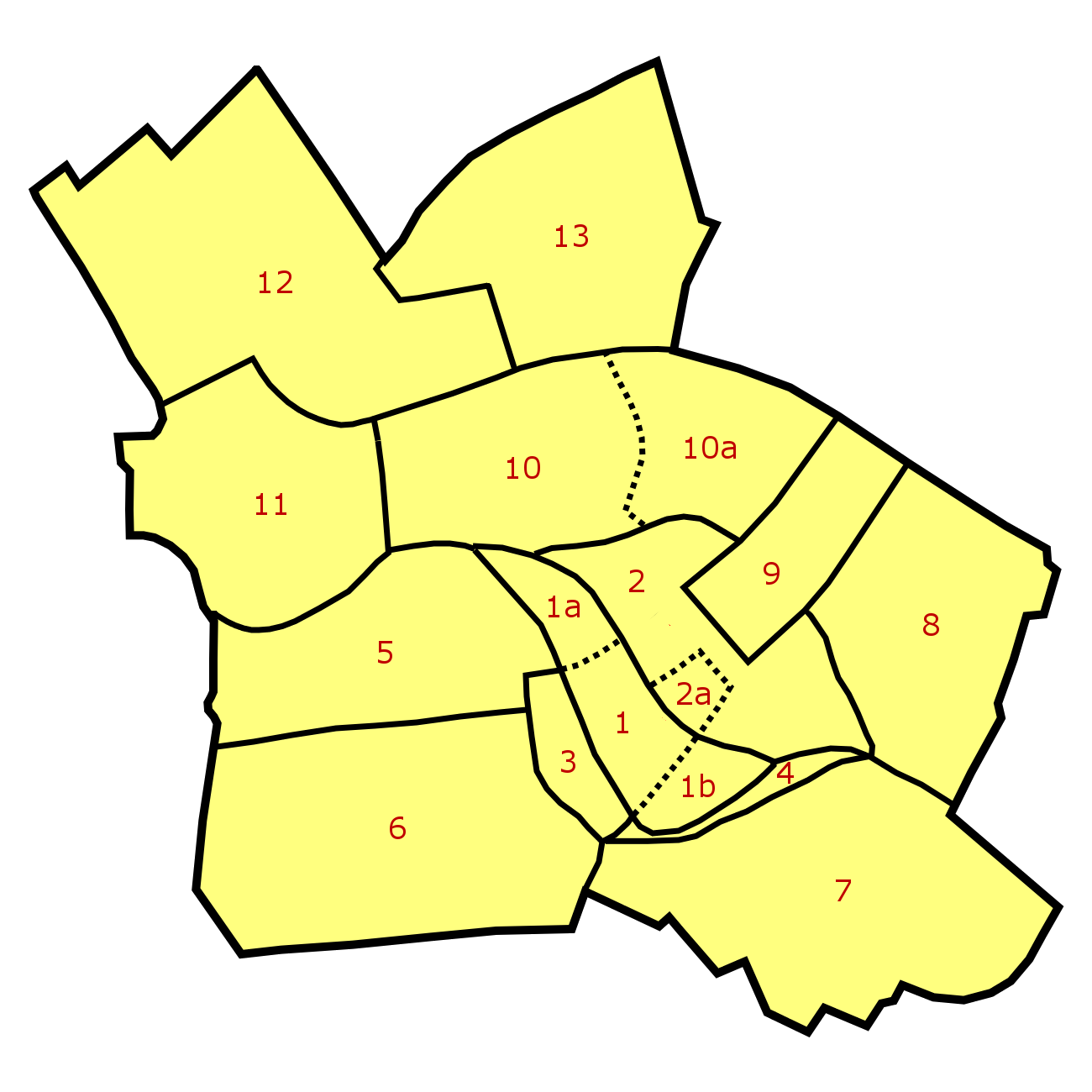
Quarters of Berlin-Mitte: Cölln (1); Museum Island (1a); Fisher Island (1b); Alt-Berlin (2); Nikolaiviertel (2a); Friedrichswerder (3); Neukölln am Wasser (4); Dorotheenstadt (5); Friedrichstadt (6); Luisenstadt (7); Stralauer Vorstadt (8); Alexanderplatz (9); Spandauer Vorstadt (10); Scheunenviertel (10a); Friedrich-Wilhelm-Stadt (11); Oranienburger Vorstadt (12); Rosenthaler Vorstadt (13)

Luisenstadt (German pronunciation: [luˈiːzn̩ˌʃtat]) is a former quarter (Stadtteil) of central Berlin, now divided between the present localities of Mitte and Kreuzberg. It gave its name to the Luisenstadt Canal and the Luisenstädtische Kirche.

== History ==
The area of the neighbourhood was originally named Myrica and was acquired in 1261 by the city of Cölln.

== Geography ==
Luisenstadt is bounded on the north by the river Spree, in the west by the Lindenstraße (in Friedrichstadt), and in the south by the Landwehrkanal. A smaller part of the zone now belongs to Mitte (in the same-named district) and the greater part to Kreuzberg (in Friedrichshain-Kreuzberg district).

== Main sights ==
- Emmaus Church
- Evangelical-Lutheran (Old-Lutheran) Church
- Görlitzer Bahnhof
- St. Jacob's Church
- Jannowitzbrücke
- Kottbusser Tor
- Lausitzer Platz
- Luisenstadt Canal
- Luisenstadt Church
- Mariannenplatz
- St. Michael's Church
- Moritzplatz
- Oberbaumbrücke
- Oranienplatz
- St. Thomas Church
- Wassertorplatz
