= St. Marien am Behnitz =

Catholic church in Spandau, Germany

Coordinates: 52°32′21″N 13°12′28″E

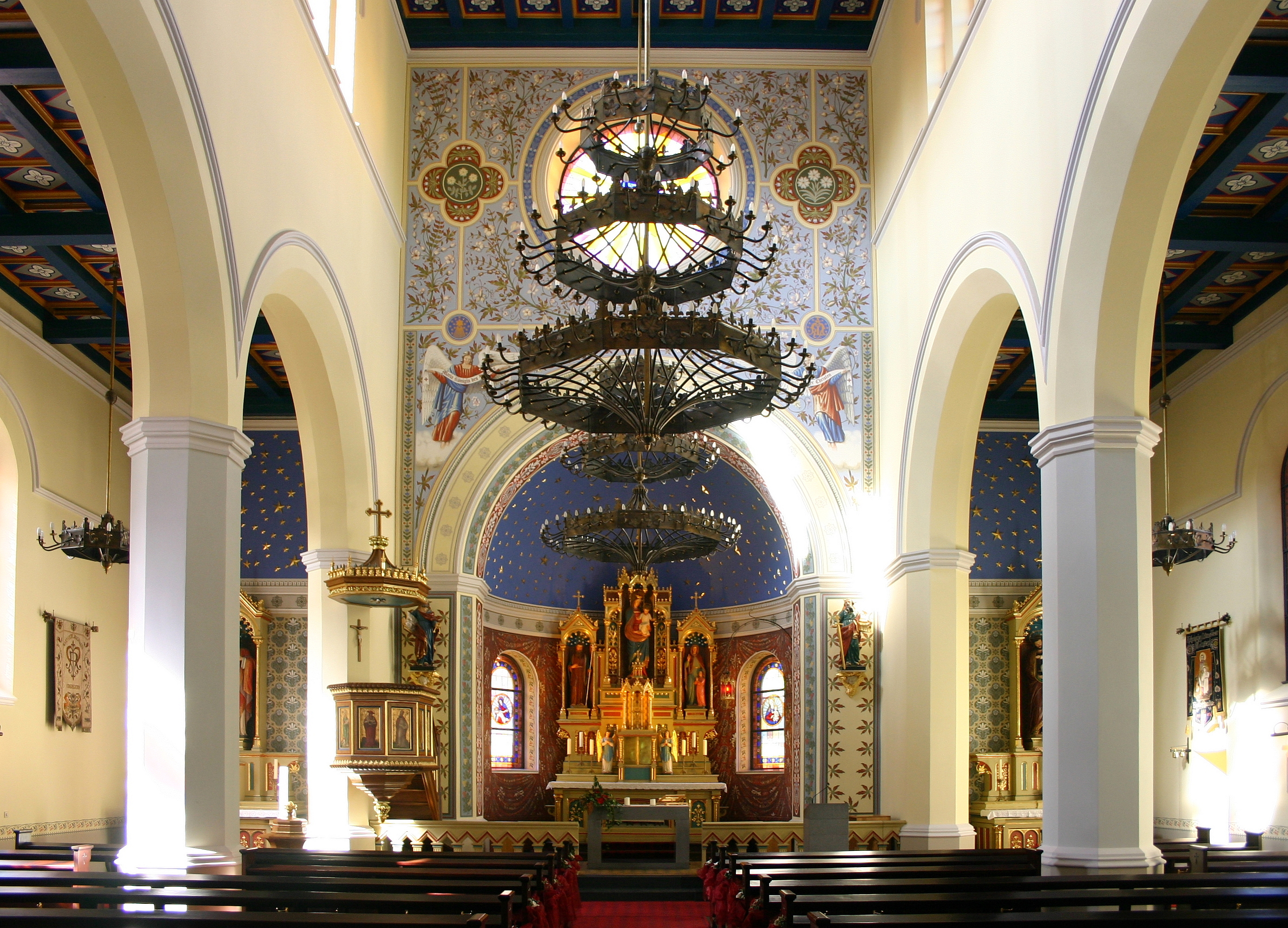
- Interior view facing the altar

- Location within Berlin Location within Germany
- Location: Spandau
- Country: Germany
- Denomination: Catholic
- Website: www.behnitz.de

History
- Status: Church
- Dedication: St. Mary
- Consecrated: 21 November 1848
- Events: Restoration 2002/03

Architecture
- Functional status: Venue for cultural events
- Heritage designation: Registered monument
- Architect: August Soller
- Style: Gothic revival
- Groundbreaking: 1847

St. Marien am Behnitz is the second-oldest Catholic church in the area of Berlin, Germany, after St. Hedwig's Cathedral. It was built in Spandau on a design by August Soller, and consecrated in 1848. Restored in 2002–2003 by private owners, it is a registered monument, used mostly for musical and literary events.

== History ==
Beginning in 1825, plans for a church were under way when the congregation grew with many soldiers from different parts of Prussia moving to the Spandau garrison. In 1847 the foundation was laid for a new church within the city walls at the Behnitz, one of the oldest settlements of Spandau. It was dedicated to Mary, in memory of a former monastery in the southern part of the town.

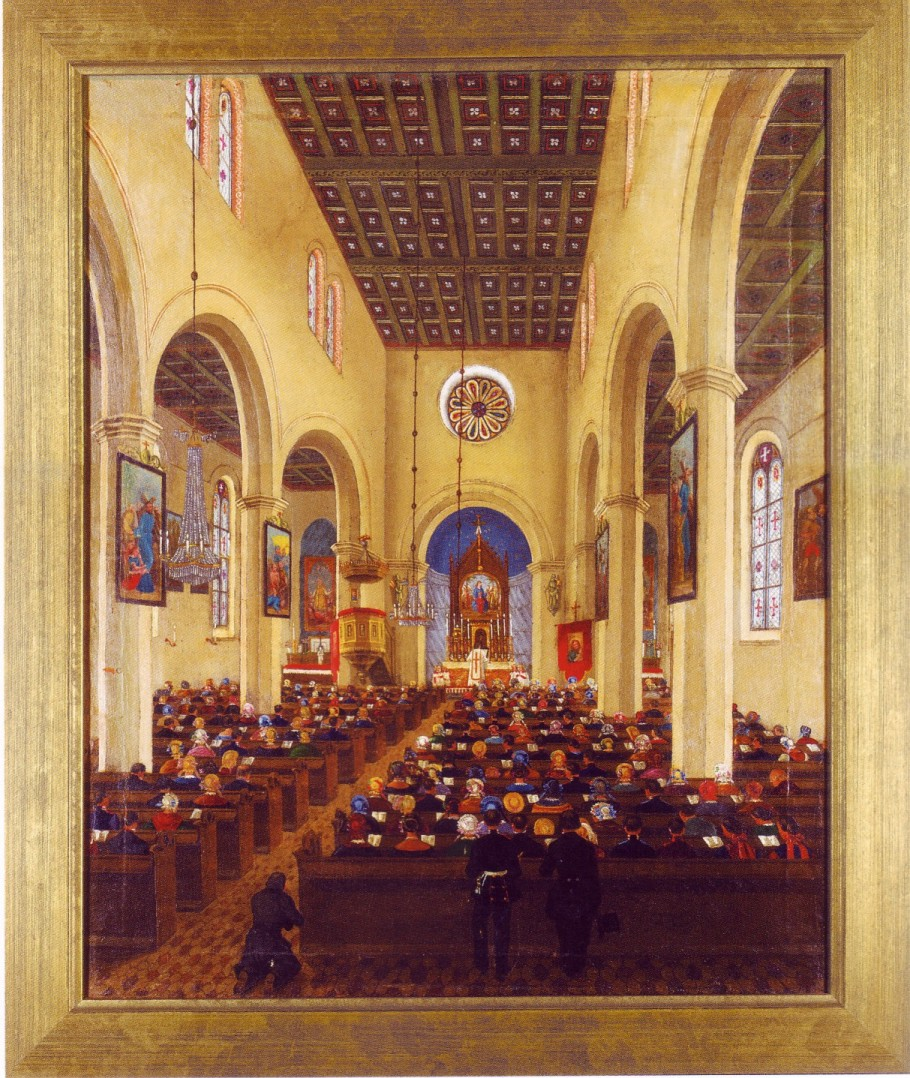
The interior on an oil painting from 1861

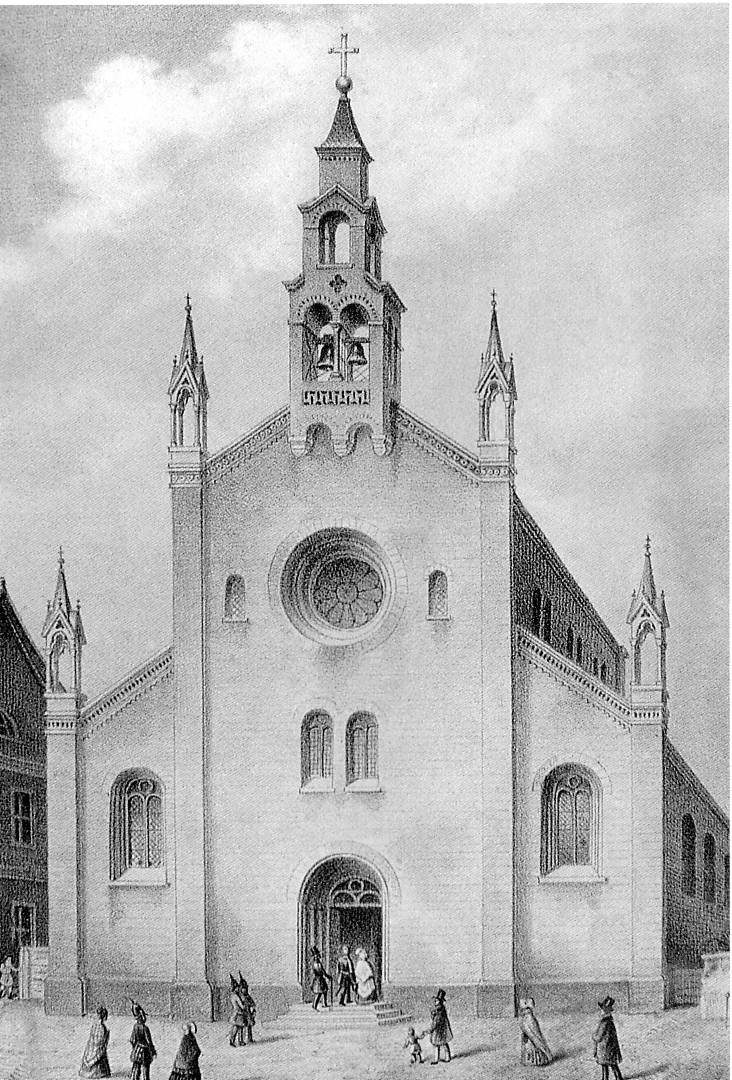
St. Marien am Behnitz 1848

Plans for new church buildings had to be approved by the Oberbaudeputation. August Soller was responsible for the application and refused his approval, offering to deliver his own plans, which were more in keeping with the new royal program for church buildings. Soller's design was approved by Frederick William IV of Prussia, with minor changes.

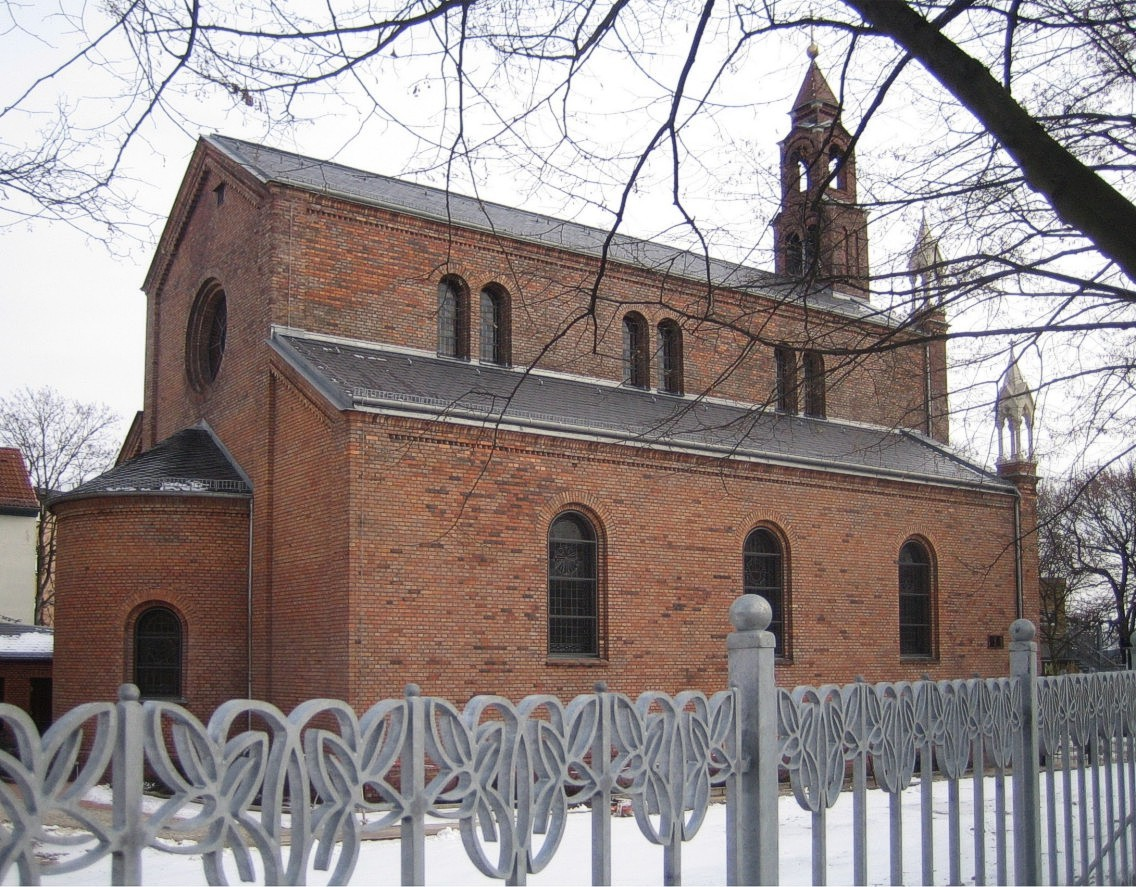
St. Marien am Behnitz

The building was supervised by Bauinspektor Julius Manger, who was long regarded as the architect. The church was consecrated on 21 November 1848. The first interior design was probably by Manger.

In World War II, the church was damaged but was still in service until the other Spandau church, which had been completely destroyed, was rebuilt in 1952. The building deteriorated in the following years, but first restoration began in 1964. A fire in 1970 damaged the building further. In 1995, the Diocese of Berlin acquired the building from the Federal Republic. It was used only occasionally by "free churches" and foreign congregations. The diocese sold the building in 2002 to a private investor who planned to use it for concerts and literary events, under the condition that liturgical use would still be possible, and the requests of preservation of a historic monument fulfilled. The restoration of the building with care for historic detail won awards.

== Literature ==
- Helmut Kißner, Cordia Schlegelmilch: Die Kirche St.; Marien am Behnitz in Spandau. Ein vergessenes Werk August Sollers. Nicolaische Verlagsbuchhandlung GmbH, Berlin 2004, ISBN 3-89479-117-9.
