= Luisenstadt Canal =

Canal in Berlin, 1852 to 1926

Coordinates: 52°30′21″N 13°25′07″E

Course of the Luisenstadt Canal (light blue), showing the line of the Berlin Wall (red).

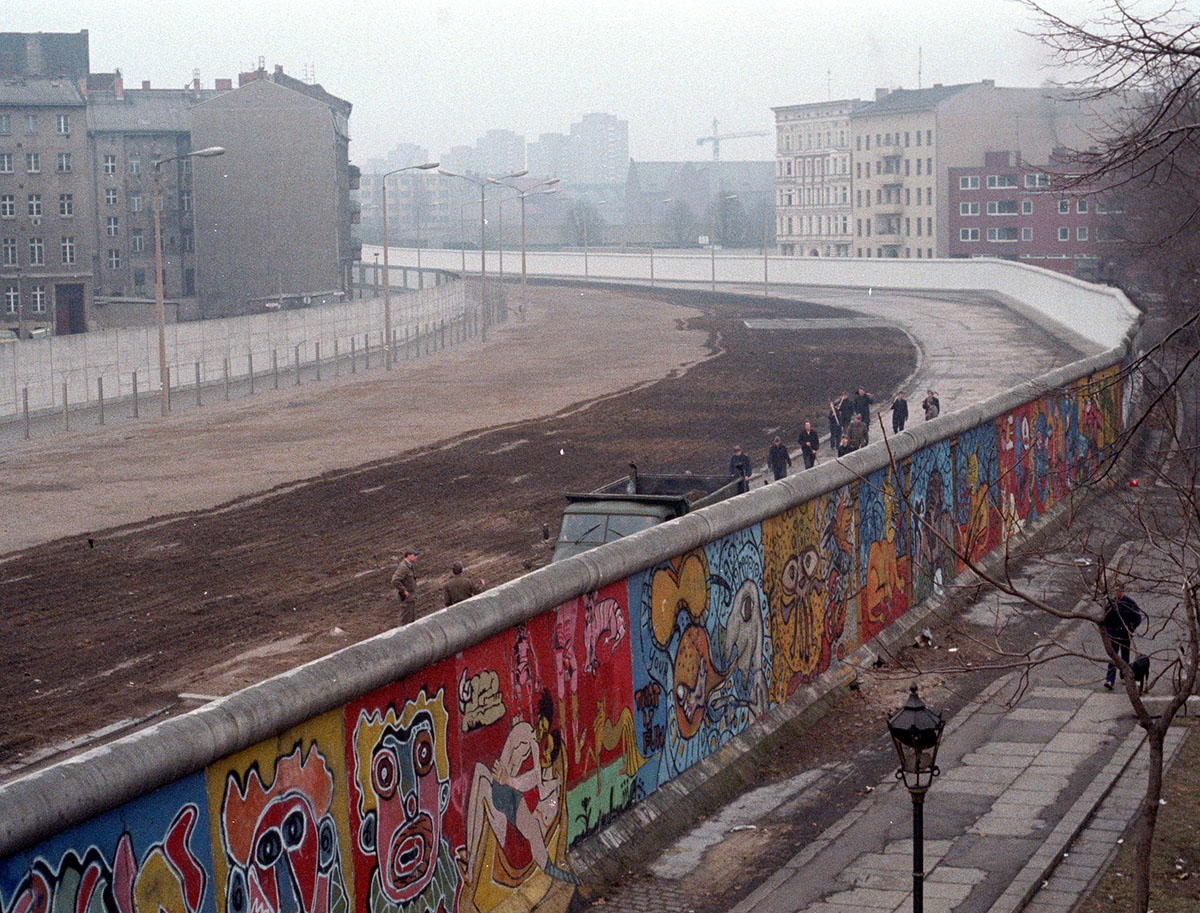
The Berlin Wall in 1986; the canal ran where the dark-brown dirt is shown in this photo.

The Luisenstadt Canal, or Luisenstädtischer Kanal, was a 2.3-kilometre-long (1.4 mi) canal in Berlin, Germany. It is named after the Luisenstadt district and ran through today's districts of Kreuzberg and Mitte, linking the Landwehr Canal with the River Spree, and serving a central canal basin known as the Engelbecken or Angel's Pool. The canal is named after Queen Louise, the wife of King Friedrich Wilhelm III.

The canal was designed by Peter Joseph Lenné based on earlier plans by Johann Carl Ludwig Schmid and was built between 1848 and 1852. Besides its transport, drainage and sewage roles, it is also a design element in the development of the surrounding area, and was designed as a decorative strip, flanked by quays lined with neoclassical buildings.

The canal never attracted significant boat traffic, and due to its slow flow and increasing sewage contamination became stagnant and offensive. Between 1926 and 1932, the canal was partially filled in and transformed by the landscape gardener Erwin Barth into a sunken garden, with its ground level at about the old water level. The Engelbecken was retained as an ornamental pool with the addition of fountains.

During and immediately after the Second World War, parts of the gardens were badly damaged, and sections of the sunken gardens in-filled with rubble. In 1961 the Berlin Wall was constructed along the northern part of the course of the former canal. Since 1991, many of the destroyed gardens have been restored to the design of 1928.

== See also ==
- Legiendamm
- Leuschnerdamm
