= Leuschnerdamm =

Street in Berlin, Germany

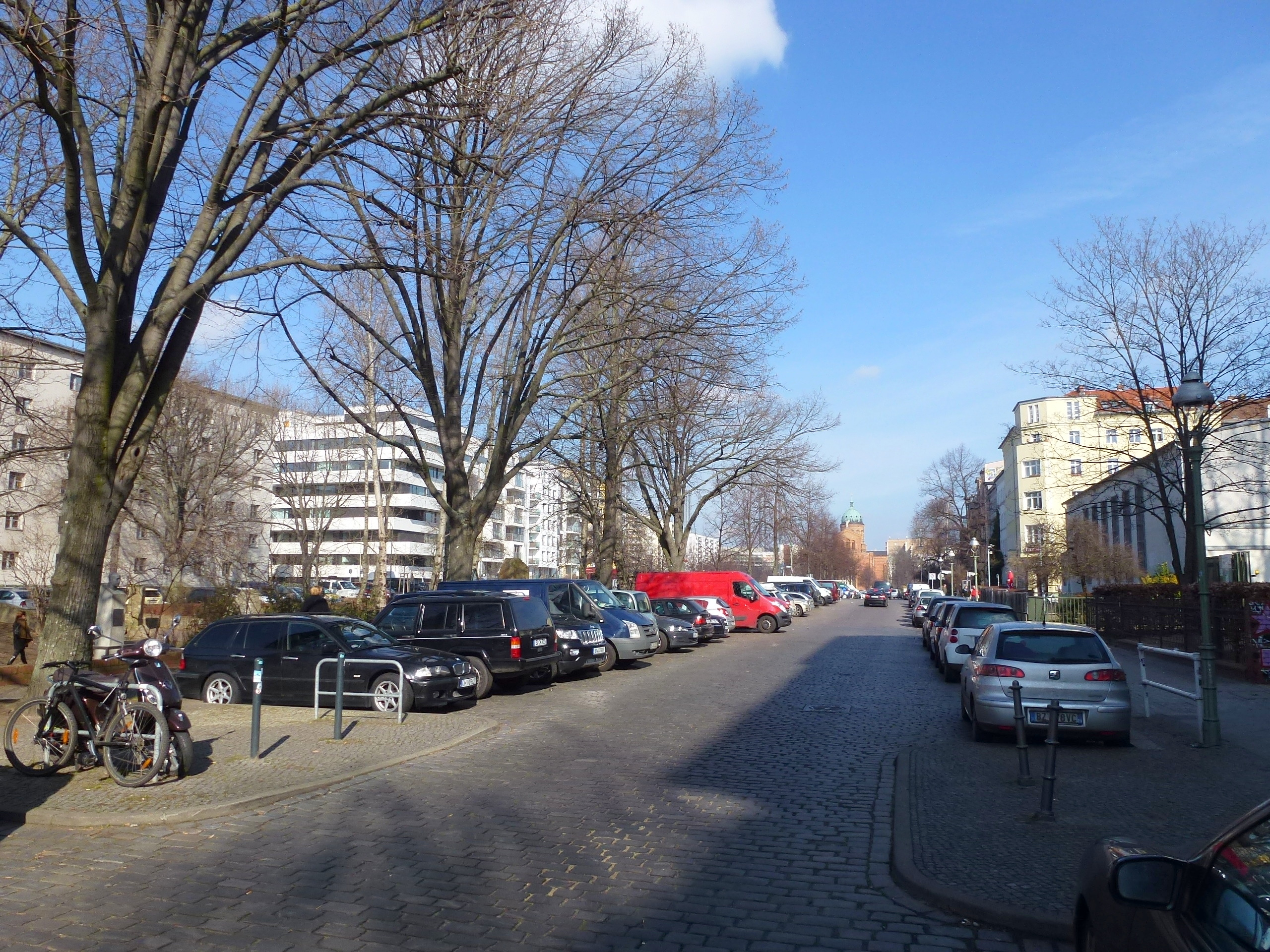
- Leuschnerdamm in 2016
- Interactive map of Leuschnerdamm
- Former names: Elisabethufer; (1849–1937); Schröderdamm; (1937–1947)
- Namesake: Wilhelm Leuschner
- Type: Street
- Location: Berlin, Germany
- Quarter: Mitte, Kreuzberg
- Nearest metro station: Moritzplatz
- Coordinates: 52°30′17″N 13°25′04″E
- North end: Michaelkirchplatz; Engeldamm
- Major junctions: Bethaniendamm; Waldemarstraße
- South end: Oranienplatz

Leuschnerdamm is a street in Kreuzberg, Berlin, Germany.

== See also ==
- Bust of Carl Legien
- Bust of Wilhelm Leuschner
