= Schinkel school =

The Schinkel school (German: Schinkelschule) was a German architectural style active from 1840 to the end of the 19th century. It is named after its head, Karl Friedrich Schinkel.

== See also ==
- Rundbogenstil
