= Bust of Carl Legien =

Sculpture in Berlin, Germany

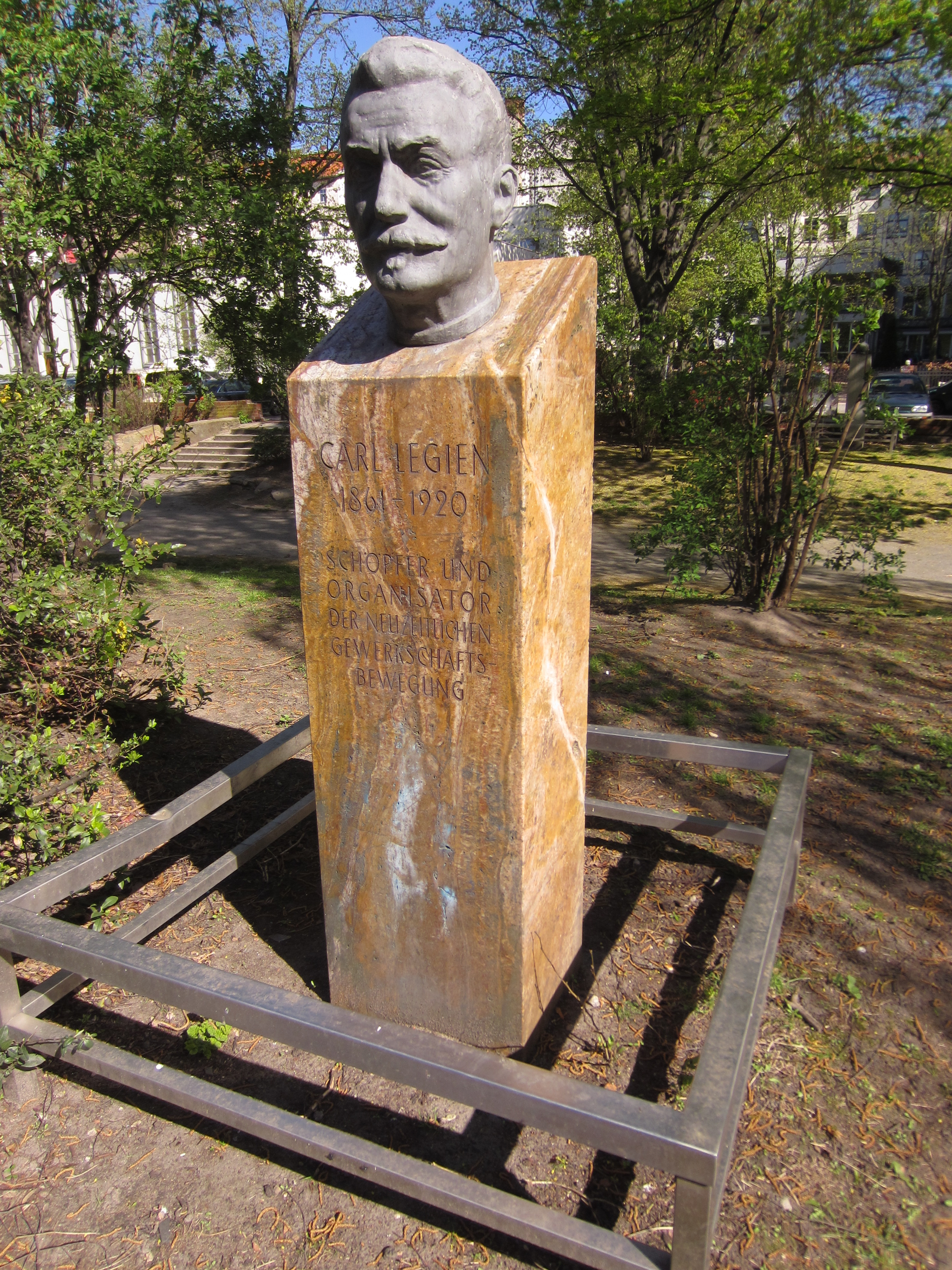
- The bust in 2016
- Artist: Karl Trumpf
- Year: 1959
- Subject: Carl Legien
- Location: Kreuzberg, Berlin, Germany; 52.50352°N 13.41654°E

A 1959 bust of Carl Legien by Karl Trumpf is installed along Legiendamm in Kreuzberg, Berlin, Germany.

== Description ==
The stone bust on Carl Legien rests on a marble base.

== History ==
The sculpture was completed before the artist's death in 1959, and installed in 1962. It was removed in 1978 and re-installed in 1989. In 2013, the bronze bust was replaced with a stone impression by sculptor Ute Hoffritz, and re-inaugurated on 20 August.
