= List of places of worship in Berlin =

This list of places of worship in Berlin records past and present places of worship in the city. The list is organised as a sortable table assorted following the given names of the various institutions.

== Table of past and present places of worship in Berlin ==
By clicking on the buttons the list can be ordered along the following features:

- main name element (using a uniformed name variant, neglecting differences like Lutherkirche or Martin-Luther-Kirche),
- locality or zone of Berlin,
- alternative name (colloquial, or also former names),
- namesake (also e.g. patron saint, where this applies),
- year of erection / establishment or adaptation to religious usage,
- religion or denomination,
- religious body, to which the local congregation is affiliated or which owns the building outright,
- borough of Berlin.

For the names of the religions and denominations the table uses abbreviations (see section Abbreviations for religions and denominations). The religious bodies are abbreviated in the table, a number of abbreviations are officially used and therefore derive from the native named of the bodies (see section Abbreviations for religious bodies. For the names of the twelve boroughs the table uses the following forms (see section Abbreviations used for the borough names. The table does not claim to record the exact data for every entry.

name	locality & picture	alternative name	namesake / remarks	Erected (E:) / adapted (A:) / destroyed (D:) / newly built (N:) / recon- structed (R:) in	reli- gion or deno- mina- tion	body	borough
Adventhaus en: Advent House	Charlottenburg	–	no namesake Schlossstraße 6	E: ?	Adv.†	7DA	C-W
Adventhaus en: Advent House	Reinickendorf	–	no namesake Am Schäfersee	E: 1949–1950	Adv.†	7DA	Rein.-df
Adventhaus en: Advent House	Wilmersdorf	–	no namesake Koblenzer Straße	E: 1925–1926	Adv.†	7DA	C-W
Adventskirche en: Advent Church	Prenzlauer Berg	–	Advent Danziger Straße / Heinz-Bartsch-Straße, listed building	E: 1910–1911; Dam. 1945; R: 1949–1951	Luth.†	EKBO	F-K
Ahmadiyya-Moschee en: Ahmadiyya Mosque	Wilmersdorf	Wilmersdorfer Moschee (i.e. Wilmersdorf Mosque), formerly Berliner Moschee (i.e. Berlin Mosque)	Ahmadiyya Brienner Straße, listed building	E: 1924–1928	Isl. Sun.	AAIIL	C-W
Akademiekirche Sankt Thomas von Aquin en: Academy Church of St. Thomas Aquinas	Oranienburger Vorstadt	Sankt-Thomas-von-Aquin-Kirche (i.e. St. Thomas Aquinas Church)	Thomas Aquinas Hannoversche Straße	E: 1996–1999	RC†	AB	Mitte
Aksa-Moschee en: Aqsa Mosque	Gesundbrunnen	Masjid-al-Aqsa (i.e. Aqsa Mosque)	Aqsa Mosque Soldiner Straße	E: ?	Isl. Sun.	?	Mitte
Akşemseddin-Moschee en: Akşemsettin Mosque	Gesundbrunnen	Akşemsettin Camii (i.e. Akşemsettin Mosque)	Akşemsettin Bellermannstraße	E: ?	Isl. Sun.	?	Mitte
Albert-Schweitzer-Kirche en: Albert Schweitzer Church	Reinickendorf	–	Schweitzer, Albert Auguste-Viktoria-Allee	E: 1966–1968	Luth.†	EKBO	Rein.-df
Allerheiligenkirche en: All Hallows Church	Borsigwalde	–	All Saints Räuschstraße, listed building	E: 1954–1955	RC†	AB	Rein.-df
Amerikanische Kirche en: American Church	Schöneberg	–	no namesake Motzstraße	E: 1898–1903; D: 1944; D: 1958 (ruin)	Luth.†	ELCA	T-S
Ananiaskirche en: Ananias Church	Rixdorf	–	Ananias of Damascus Wilhelm-Busch-Straße / Treptower Straße	E: 1967–1968; D: 2013	removed last: Luth.†	last: EKBO	Neuk.
Andachtsraum des Bundestages en: Bundestag Oratory	Tiergarten	–	no namesake the parliament's place of worship within the Reichstag building	A: 1998–1999	interfaith	Deutscher Bundestag	Mitte
Andreaskirche en: Andrew Church	Wannsee	Neue Kirche (i.e. New Church) before 1965	Andrew the Apostle Lindenstraße (Wannsee), listed building	E: 1895–1896	Luth.†	EKBO	S-Z
Apostel-Andreas-Kirche en: Andrew the Apostle Church	Wittenau	Adolf-Stoecker-Gemeindeheim (i.e. Adolf Stoecker community home) till 1969	Andrew the Apostle Schlitzer Straße / Eichhorster Weg	E: 1936–1937	Luth.†	EKBO	Rein.-df
Apostel-Johannes-Gemeindezentrum en: John the Apostle Congregation Centre	Märkisches Viertel	–	John the Apostle Dannenwalder Weg	E: 1970–1971	Luth.†	EKBO	Rein.-df
Apostel-Paulus-Kirche en: Paul the Apostle Church	Hermsdorf	Hindenburg-Gedächtnis-Kirche (i.e. Hindenburg Memorial Church) till 1946	Paul (Sha'ul) of Tarsus Wachsmuthstraße / Schlossstraße, listed building	E: 1934–1935	Luth.†	EKBO	Rein.-df
Apostel-Paulus-Kirche en: Paul the Apostle Church	Schöneberg	–	Paul (Sha'ul) of Tarsus Akazienstraße / Grunewaldstraße, listed building	E: 1892–1894; D: Jan. 1944; R: 1949	Luth.†	EKBO	T-S
Apostolische Gemeinde en: Apostolic Congregation	Moabit	–	no namesake Perleberger Straße	E: ?	AC†	?	Mitte
Auenkirche en: about: Meadows Church	Wilmersdorf	–	no namesake Wilhelmsaue	E: 1895–1897	Luth.†	EKBO	C-W
Auferstehungskirche en: Resurrection Church	Charlottenburg	–	Resurrection of Jesus Kaiser-Friedrich-Straße 87; in 1922 opened in a former masonic lodge, erected between 1893 and 1894, which had intermittently been used as a dancing hall	E: 1894; A: 1922	Meth.†	UMC	C-W
Auferstehungskirche en: Resurrection Church	Friedrichshain	–	Resurrection of Jesus Friedensstraße, listed building	E: 1892–1895; D: 1943/1944; R: till 1961; A: 2000–2002	UP†	EKBO	F-K
Augustana-Kirche en: Augustana Church	Oranienburger Vorstadt	–	Augsburg Confession Usedomer Straße	E: 1894; D: 1943; N: 1950; N: 1963	Luth.†	SELK	Mitte
Ayasofya-Moschee en: Ayasofya Mosque	Moabit	Ayasofya Camii (i.e. Hagia Sophia Mosque)	Hagia Sophia Stromstraße	E: ?	Isl. Sun.	MG	Mitte
Baptistenkapelle Gesundbrunnen en: Gesundbrunnen Baptist Chapel	Oranienburger Vorstadt	–	no namesake Wattstraße, congregation now merged with Wedding Baptists	E: ? D: 194?	removed last: Bapt.†	last: UFC	Mitte
Baptistenkapelle Rixdorf en: Rixdorf Baptist Chapel	Rixdorf	–	no namesake Boddinstraße (destroyed chapel, front bldg. see photo), Hertzbergstraße (new chapel)	E: 1910; D: 1944	Bapt.†	UFC	Neuk.
Baptistenkapelle Schmidstraße en: Schmidstrasse Baptist Chapel	Luisenstadt	Baptistenkapelle Berlin (i.e. Berlin Baptist Chapel, since it was first and thus at the beginning the only one)	no namesake Schmidstraße 17, congregation moved to Tempelhofer Damm 133–137	E: 1848; A: 1861; D: 2 Febr. 1945	removed last: Bapt.†	last: UFC	Mitte
Baptistenkapelle Spandau I en: Spandau No. I Baptist Chapel	Spandau New Town	–	no namesake Jagowstraße 17	E: 1902; D: 1944; N: 195?	Bapt.†	UFC	Spand.
Baptistenkapelle Steglitz en: Steglitz Baptist Chapel (till 1943)	Steglitz	–	no namesake Klingsorstraße 8	E: 1906; D: 1943	Bapt.†	removed last: UFC	S-Z
Baptistenkapelle Steglitz en: Steglitz Baptist Chapel (since 1956)	Steglitz	–	no namesake Rothenburgstraße, replacing the ruin on Klingsorstraße 8	E: 1952–1956	Bapt.†	UFC	S-Z
Baptistenkirche Rixdorf en: Rixdorf Baptist Church	Rixdorf	–	no namesake Böhmische Straße / Hertzbergstraße (replacing the destroyed chapel on Boddinstr.)	E: 1954	Bapt.†	UFC	Neuk.
Baptistenkirche Wedding en: Baptist Church in Wedding	Wedding	–	no namesake Müllerstraße	E: 18??	Bapt.†	UFC	Mitte
Begegnungskirche en: Church of Encounter	Reinickendorf	Lutherkirche (i.e. Luther Church) till 2005	Gotthardstraße / Winterthurstraße 7	E: 1962–1966	PC†	BFP	Rein.-df
Bekenntniskirche en: Confession Church	Alt-Treptow	–	Confession of faith Plesser Straße, listed building	E: 1930–1931	Luth.†	EKBO	T-K
Bethanienkirche en: Bethany Church	Weißensee	–	Bethany Mirbachplatz, listed building	E: 1900–1902; D: Febr. 1945	ruin last: Luth.†	last: APU	Pankow
Bethelkirche en: Bethel Church	Friedrichshain	–	Bethel Gubener Straße 11	E: 188? D: 194?	removed last: Bapt.†	last: UFC	F-K
Bethelkirche en: Bethel Church	Lichterfelde	–	Bethel Marienplatz	E: 1964	Bapt.†	UFC	S-Z
Bethlehemskirche en: Bethlehem's Church	Friedrichstadt	Böhmische Kirche (i.e. Bohemian Church)	Bethlehem void renamed into Bethlehemskirchplatz	E: 1735–1737; D: 24 Nov. 1943; D: 1960 (ruin)	removed last: Sim. of Ref.† a. Luth.†	last: APU	Mitte
Bethlehemskirche en: Bethlehem's Church	Rixdorf	Dorfkirche Rixdorf (i.e. Rixdorf Village Church) before 1887	Bethlehem Richardplatz / Schudomastraße, listed building, Bohemian Lutheran	E: early 15th c. D: 1639; R: 1640s	Luth.†	EKBO	Neuk.
Betsaal der Bethlehemsgemeinde en: Prayer Hall of Bethlehem's Congregation	Rixdorf	–	no namesake Richardstraße	E: 1750–1751; N: 1835; D: 1943; R: 1950	Ref.†	EKBO	Neuk.
Bethaus der Bibel-Gemeinde en: Prayer House of the Bible Congregation	Neu-Hohen- schönhausen	Bethaus der Evangeliums-Christengemeinde Wartenberg (i.e. Prayer House of the Gospel-Christian Congregation Wartenberg)	no namesake Wustrower Straße	E: 2002	Sim. of Ev.cal† a. Sht.†	AeG	Licht.-bg
Betsaal der Herrnhuter Brüdergemeine en: Prayer Hall of the Moravian Brethren	Rixdorf	–	no namesake Kirchgasse / Donaustr., listed building	E: 1761; D: 1944; N: 1961–1962	Morav.†	UF	Neuk.
Bilal-Moschee en: Bilal Mosque	Gesundbrunnen	Bilal Camii (i.e. Bilal Mosque)	Bilal ibn Rabah al-Habashi Drontheimer Straße	E: ?	Isl. Sun.	?	Mitte
Bruder-Klaus-Kirche en: St. Nicholas of Flüe Church	Britz	–	Nicholas of Flüe Bruno-Taut-Ring / Fritz-Reuter-Allee	E: 1958–1960; N: 1987–1989	RC†	AB	Neuk.
Wat Buddharama en: Wat Buddharama	Marzahn	–	Buddharama Schönagelstraße	E: ?	Buddh.Th.	?	M-H
Wat Buddhavihara en: Wat Buddha Vihara	Wittenau	–	Buddha Vihara Steinkirchener Straße	E: ?	Buddh.Th.	?	Rein.-df
Das Buddhistische Haus en: The Buddhist House	Frohnau	–	no namesake Edelhofdamm 54	E: 1923–1926	Buddh.	?	Rein.-df
Chabad Synagoge en: Chabad Synagogue	Wilmersdorf	–	no namesake Münstersche Straße	A: ?	Jew. Orth.	Chabad	C-W
Christ-Embassy-Kirche en: Christ Embassy Church	Moabit	Sankt-Laurentius-Kirche (i.e. St. Lawrence Church) till 2007	Lawrence of Rome Bandelstraße, formerly Roman Catholic, rented out to the Christ Embassy Church since 2007	E: 1913–1914; D: 1943; N: 1950–1952; A: 2007	Ev.cal†	AB	Mitte
Christi-Auferstehungs-Kathedrale en: Resurrection of Christ Cathedral	Wilmersdorf	–	Resurrection of Jesus Hohenzollerndamm / Berliner Straße	E: 1936–1938	Orth.†	ROCOR	C-W
Christianskirken en: Christian's Church	Wilmersdorf	Dänische Kirche (i.e. Danish Church)	Christian III of Denmark Brienner Straße site of destroyed Swedish home for the elderly, in 1912 congregation est.; 1st church in Stresemannstr. 57c until 1965.	E: 1928; D: 1965; N: 1967	Luth.†	DCA	C-W
Christkönig-Kirche en: Christ the King Church	Lübars	–	Christ the King Zabel-Krüger-Damm	E: 1951	RC†	AB	Rein.-df
Christus-König-Kirche en: Christ the King Church	Adlershof	–	Christ the King Nipkowstraße, listed building	E: 1928–1931	RC†	AB	T-K
Christophoruskirche en: Christopher Church	Friedrichshagen	–	Christophorus Bölschestraße / Aßmannstraße, listed building	E: 1901–1903	Luth.†	EKBO	T-K
Christophoruskirche en: Christopher Church	Siemensstadt	Kirche Siemensstadt (Siemensstadt Church) till 1991	Christophorus Schuckertdamm, listed building	E: 1929–1931	Luth.†	EKBO	Spand.
Christuskirche en: Christ Church	Friedrichshain	Elimkirche (i.e. Elim Church) till 1945	Jesus of Nazareth Richard-Sorge-Straße, provisional church building, listed building	E: 1895; D: 3 Febr. 1945; N: 1948	Meth.†	UMC	F-K
Christuskirche en: Christ Church	Tempelhofer; Vorstadt	–	Jesus of Nazareth Hornstraße, the old building was on Stresemannstraße 46	E: 1863–1864; D: 16 Dec. 1943; N: 1963–1964	Luth.†	EKBO	F-K
Christuskirche en: Christ Church	Tempelhofer; Vorstadt	—	Jesus of Nazareth Dieffenbachstraße / Hohenstaufenplatz	E: 1905–1908	Meth.†	UMC	F-K
Christuskirche en: Christ Church	Rosenthaler; Vorstadt	—	Jesus of Nazareth Anklamer Straße, Lutheran before 1992, listed building	E: 1895–1898	PC†	BFP	Mitte
Christuskirche en: Christ Church	Ober- schöneweide	—	Jesus of Nazareth Firlstraße, listed building, the church was profaned between 1945–1949 and again 1988–2004	E: 1906–1908; D: 1943–1945; R: 1950; A: 2004	Luth.†	EKBO	T-K
Danielkirche en: Daniel Church	Wilmersdorf	–	Daniel the Prophet Brandenburgische Straße	E: 1966–1967	Luth.†	EKBO	C-W
Dankeskirche en: Church of Thanks	Wedding	–	Gratitude by William I for being saved from Hödel's attempt on his life in 1878 Weddingplatz / Fennstraße / Reinickendorfer Straße / Müllerstraße	E 1882–1884; D: 1944; D: 1949 (ruin); N: 1950–1951; N: 1970–1972	Luth.†	EKBO	Mitte
Dietrich-Bonhoeffer-Kirche en: Dietrich Bonhoeffer Church	Lichtenrade	–	Bonhoeffer, Dietrich Rackebüller Weg	E: 1955–1956 and 1958	Luth.†	EKBO	T-S
Dorfkirche Altglienicke en: Altglienicke Village Church	Altglienicke	–	buried in oblivion Semelweisstraße / Köpenicker Straße, listed building	E: before 1375; D: 1640s N: 1757–1759; D: 1894; N: 1894–1895	Luth.†	EKBO	T-K
Dorfkirche Blankenburg en: Blankenburg Village Church	Blankenburg	–	buried in oblivion Alt-Blankenburg, listed building	E: by 1250	Luth.†	EKBO	Pankow
Dorfkirche Blankenfelde en: Blankenfelde Village Church	Blankenfelde	–	buried in oblivion Hauptstraße / Schildower Straße, listed building	E: by 1400	Luth.†	EKBO	Pankow
Dorfkirche Bohnsdorf en: Bohnsdorf Village Church	Bohnsdorf	–	buried in oblivion Dorfplatz, listed building	E: 1755–1757	Luth.†	EKBO	T-K
Dorfkirche Britz en: Britz Village Church	Britz	–	buried in oblivion Backbergstraße, listed building	E: 2nd half of 13th c.	Luth.†	EKBO	Neuk.
Dorfkirche Buckow en: Buckow Village Church	Buckow	–	buried in oblivion Alt-Buckow, listed building	E: 1246–1255	Luth.†	EKBO	Neuk.
Dorfkirche Falkenberg en: Falkenberg Village Church	Falkenberg	–	buried in oblivion	E: 14th c. A: 1795; D: 1945	ruin last: Luth.†	last: APU	Licht.-bg
Dorfkirche Französisch-Bucholz en: Französisch-Bucholz Village Church	Französisch Buchholz	–	buried in oblivion Hauptstraße, listed building	E: by 1250	Luth.†	EKBO	Pankow
Dorfkirche Friedrichsfelde en: Friedrichsfelde Village Church	Friedrichsfelde	Dorfkirche Rosenfelde (i.e. Rosenfelde Village Church) before 1699	buried in oblivion Am Tierpark / Alfred-Kowalke-Straße, listed building	E: by 1250; A: 1718–1728; N: 1887–1890; D: 1943/1945; R: 1950–1952	Luth.†	EKBO	Licht.-bg
Dorfkirche Gatow en: Gatow Village Church	Gatow	–	buried in oblivion Alt-Gatow, listed building	E: 1301–1315	Luth.†	EKBO	Spand.
Dorfkirche Giesensdorf en: Giesensdorf Village Church	Lichterfelde	–	buried in oblivion Ostpreußendamm / Osdorfer Straße, listed building	E: by 1300; D: 1945; R: 1954	Luth.†	EKBO	S-Z
Dorfkirche Heiligensee en: Heiligensee Village Church	Heiligensee	–	buried in oblivion Alt-Heiligensee, listed building	E: 15/16th c. A: 1760s	Luth.†	EKBO	Rein-df
Dorfkirche Heinersdorf en: Heinersdorf Village Church	Heinersdorf	–	buried in oblivion Romain-Rolland-Straße, listed building	E: 1175–1200	Luth.†	EKBO	Pankow
Dorfkirche Hermsdorf en: Hermsdorf Village Church	Hermsdorf	–	buried in oblivion Almutstraße	E: medieval N: 1756	Luth.†	EKBO	Rein.-df
Dorfkirche Karow en: Karow Village Church	Karow	–	buried in oblivion Alt-Karow, listed building	E: 1st half of 13th c.	Luth.†	EKBO	Pankow
Dorfkirche Kladow en: Kladow Village Church	Kladow	–	buried in oblivion Alt-Kladow, listed building	E: 14/15th c. D: 1808; N: 1818–1819	Luth.†	EKBO	Spand.
Dorfkirche Lankwitz en: Lankwitz Village Church	Lankwitz	–	buried in oblivion Alt-Lankwitz, listed building	E: 1230–1300; D: 1943; R: 1955–1956	Luth.†	EKBO	S-Z
Dorfkirche Lichtenberg en: Lichtenberg Village Church	Lichtenberg	Alte Pfarrkirche (i.e. old parish church)	buried in oblivion Loeperplatz / Möllendorffstraße	E: 2nd half of 13th c. D: 1945; R: 1953–1956	Luth.†	EKBO	Licht.-bg
Dorfkirche Lichtenrade en: Lichtenrade Village Church	Lichtenrade	–	buried in oblivion Alt-Lichtenrade, listed building	E: by 1300; D: Dec. 1943; R: 1948	Luth.†	EKBO	T-S
Dorfkirche Lichterfelde en: Lichterfelde Village Church	Lichterfelde	–	buried in oblivion Hindenburgdamm, listed building	E: 14th c.	Luth.†	EKBO	S-Z
Dorfkirche Lübars en: Lübars Village Church	Lübars	–	buried in oblivion Alt-Lübars, listed building	E: early 15th c. D: 1790; N: 1791–1793	Luth.†	EKBO	Rein.-df
Dorfkirche Mahlsdorf en: Mahlsdorf Village Church	Mahlsdorf	–	buried in oblivion Hönower Straße, listed building	E: by 1250	Luth.†	EKBO	M-H
Dorfkirche Malchow en: Malchow Village Church	Malchow	–	buried in oblivion Dorfstraße (Malchow)	E: 2nd half of 13th c. A: 1691; D: 20 Apr. 1945	ruin last: Luth.†	last: APU	Licht.-bg
Dorfkirche Mariendorf en: Mariendorf Village Church	Mariendorf	–	buried in oblivion Alt-Mariendorf, listed building	E: by 1240	Luth.†	EKBO	T-S
Dorfkirche Marienfelde en: Marienfelde Village Church	Marienfelde	–	buried in oblivion	E: by 1220	Luth.†	EKBO	T-S
Dorfkirche Marzahn en: Marzahn Village Church	Marzahn	–	buried in oblivion Alt-Marzahn, listed building	E: 13th c. N: 1870–1871	Luth.†	EKBO	M-H
Dorfkirche Müggelheim en: Müggelheim Village Church	Müggelheim	–	no namesake Alt-Müggelheim, listed building	E: 1803–1804	Luth.†	EKBO	T-K
Dorfkirche Rahnsdorf en: Rahnsdorf Village Church	Rahnsdorf	–	buried in oblivion Dorfstraße, listed building	E: 1728; N: 1886–1887	Luth.†	EKBO	T-K
Dorfkirche Reinickendorf en: Reinickendorf Village Church	Reinickendorf	–	Mary(am) of Nazareth Alt-Reinickendorf, listed building	E: by 1486–1500	Luth.†	EKBO	Rein.-df
Dorfkirche Rosenthal en: Rosenthal Village Church	Rosenthal	–	buried in oblivion Hauptstraße, listed building	E: 1300	Luth.†	EKBO	Pankow
Dorfkirche Rudow en: Rudow Village Church	Rudow	–	buried in oblivion Köpenicker Straße, listed building	E: by 1400; D: 1945; R: 1949–1954	Luth.†	EKBO	Neuk.
Dorfkirche Schmargendorf en: Schmargendorf Village Church	Schmargendorf	–	buried in oblivion Breite Straße / Kirchstraße	E: by 1400	Luth.†	EKBO	C-W
Dorfkirche Schmöckwitz en: Schmöckwitz Village Church	Schmöckwitz	–	buried in oblivion Alt-Schmöckwitz, listed building	E: 1798–1799	Luth.†	EKBO	T-K
Dorfkirche Schöneberg en: Schöneberg Village Church	Schöneberg	also St. Immanuelkirche (i.e. St. Immanuel Church) since 1993	Immanuel Hauptstraße, listed building, since 1926 the Old Catholic Church, Ethiopian Orthodox Tewahedo Church	E: 16th c. D: 1760; N: 1764–1766; D: Febr. 1945; R: 1953–1956	Sim. of Luth.†; OCE† a. Orth.†	EKBO	T-S
Dorfkirche Staaken en: Staaken Village Church	Staaken	–	buried in oblivion Nennhauser Damm / Hauptstraße, listed building	E: by 1310; D: 1433; N: 1436–1442	Luth.†	EKBO	Spand.
Dorfkirche Stralau en: Stralau Village Church	Stralau	–	buried in oblivion Tunnelstraße, listed building	E: 1459–1464; A: 1823–1824; D: 1945; R: 1949; R: 1963	Luth.†	EKBO	F-K
Dorfkirche Tegel en: Tegel Village Church	Tegel	Dorfkirche Alt-Tegel (i.e. Old Tegel Village Church)	buried in oblivion Alt-Tegel, listed building	E: before 1714; N: 1724; N: 1756; D: 1911; N: 1911–1912; D: 26 Nov. 1943; R: 1945–1946	Luth.†	EKBO	Rein.-df
Dorfkirche Tempelhof en: Tempelhof Village Church	Tempelhof	Templerkirche (i.e. Templar Church)	buried in oblivion Reinhardtplatz / Parkstraße, listed building	E: by 1250; D: 1944; R: 1954–1956	Luth.†	EKBO	T-S
Dorfkirche Wartenberg en: Wartenberg Village Church	Wartenberg	–	buried in oblivion Falkenberger Chaussee, 1st building in Dorfstraße (Wartenberg)	E: by 1230; D: 1945; N: 1999–2000	Luth.†	EKBO	Licht.-bg
Dorfkirche Weißensee en: Weißensee Village Church	Weißensee	–	buried in oblivion Berliner Allee, listed building	E: 1286–1300; N: 1401–1425	Luth.†	EKBO	Pankow
Dorfkirche Deutsch Wilmersdorf en: Deutsch Wilmersdorf Village Church	Wilmersdorf	–	buried in oblivion	E: 1766; D: 1898	removed last: Luth.†	last: APU	C-W
Dorfkirche Wittenau en: Wittenau Village Church	Wittenau	Dorfkirche Dalldorf (i.e. Dalldorf Village Church) before 1905, Sankt Anna-Selbdritt-Kirche (i.e. St. Anna Selbdritt Church) before Reformation	Anna selbdritt Alt-Wittenau, listed building	E: 1482–1489	Luth.†	EKBO	Rein.-df
Dorfkirche Zehlendorf en: Zehlendorf Village Church	Zehlendorf	–	buried in oblivion Potsdamer Chaussee / Clayallee, listed building	E: 1768	Luth.†	EKBO	S-Z
Dorotheenstäd- tische Kirche en: Dorotheenstadt Church	Dorotheenstadt	Neustädtische Kirche (i.e. New Town's Church)	Dorotheenstadt Neustädtische Kirchstraße, till 1858 a simultaneum of Calvinists of French tongue, Lutherans and Reformed of German tongue, united Protestant since, ruin removed in 1968	E: 1680–1687; N: 1861–1863; D: June 1944; D: 1968 (ruin)	removed last: UP†	last: APU	Mitte
Dreieinigkeitskirche en: Trinity Church	Gropiusstadt	–	Trinity Lipschitzallee	E: 1969–1971	Luth.†	EKBO	Neuk.
Dreieinigkeitskirche en: Trinity Church	Südende	–	Trinity Filandastraße / Südendstraße	E: 1928–1929; D: 1943; R: 1953	Luth.†	SELK	S-Z
Dreieinigkeitskirche en: Trinity Church	Tegel	Dreieinigkeitskapelle (i.e. Trinity Chapel)	Trinity An der Mäckeritzbrücke	E: 1954	Luth.†	EKBO	Rein.-df
Dreifaltigkeitskirche en: Trinity Church	Friedrichstadt	–	Trinity Mauerstraße / Glinkastraße (formerly Kanonierstr.) / Mohrenstraße	E: 1737–1739; D: Nov. 1943	removed last: UP†	last: APU	Mitte
Dreifaltigkeitskirche en: Trinity Church	Lankwitz	–	Trinity Kaiser-Wilhelm-Straße / Gallwitzallee, listed building	E: 1903–1906; D: 24 Aug. 1943; R: 1951–?	Luth.†	EKBO	S-Z
Église Sainte-Geneviève en: St. Genevieve Church	Wittenau	–	Genevieve Avenue Charles de Gaulle, listed building, French Allied garrison church	E: 1976	prof. last: RC†	last: DB	Rein.-df
Eliaskirche en: Elijah Church	Prenzlauer Berg	MACHmit! Museum für Kinder (i.e. TAKEpart! Museum for children)	Elijah the Prophet Senefelderstraße, listed building	E: 1907–1910; Dam. 1945; R: 1950s	prof. last: Luth.†	EKBO	Pankow
Emmauskirche en: Emmaus Church	Luisenstadt	–	Emmaus Lausitzer Platz	E: 1891–1893; D: 3 Febr. 1945; N+R: 1957–1959	UP†	EKBO	F-K
Epiphanienkirche en: Epiphany Church	Westend	–	epiphany Knobelsdorffstraße	E: 1904–1906; D: 1 May 1945; R+N: 1957–1960	Luth.†	EKBO	C-W
Erasmuskapelle en: Erasmus Chapel	Cölln	Schlosskapelle (i.e. Palace Chapel); Stiftskirche Unserer Lieben Frauen, des heiligen Kreuzes, St. Petri und Pauli, St. Erasmi und St. Nicolai (i.e. Collegiate Church of Our Lady, the Holy Cross, Ss. Peter and Paul, Erasmus and Nicholas) between 1465 and 1536	Erasmus of Formiae Schlossfreiheit	E: 1443–1451; N: 1540; Prof.: 1742; N: 1845–1854; D: Febr. 1945; D: 1950	removed last: UP†	last: APU	Mitte
Erlöserkirche en: Redeemer Church	Moabit	–	Redeemer Wikingerufer / Levetzowstraße, listed building	E: 1909–1912; D: Nov. 1943; R: 1956–1958	Luth.†	EKBO	Mitte
Erlöserkirche en: Redeemer Church	Rosenthaler; Vorstadt	–	Redeemer Schröderstraße, listed building, originally owned by EKBO	E: 1904–1905	Meth.†	UMC	Mitte
Erlöserkirche en: Redeemer Church	Rummelsburg	–	Redeemer Nöldnerstraße, listed building	E: 1890–1892	Luth.†	EKBO	Licht.-bg
Ernst-Moritz-Arndt-Kirche en: Ernst Moritz Arndt Church	Zehlendorf	–	Arndt, Ernst Moritz Onkel-Tom-Straße / Wilskistraße, listed building	E: 1934–1935	Luth.†	EKBO	S-Z
Evangelisch-Lutherische Kirche Berlin en: Berlin Evangelical Lutheran Church	Luisenstadt	Annenkirche (i.e. Anna Church) in analogy to the street name	Annenstraße Annenstraße, listed building	E: 1855–1857	Luth.†	SELK	Mitte
Bethaus der Evangeliums-Christengemeinde Hellersdorf en: Prayer House of the Gospel-Christian Congregation Hellersdorf	Hellersdorf	–	no namesake Haffenländer Ring	E: ?	Sht.†	AeG	M-H
Bethaus der Evangeliums-Christengemeinde Lichtenberg en: Prayer House of the Gospel-Christian Congregation Lichtenberg	Fennpfuhl	–	no namesake Rudolf-Seiffert-Str.	E: 1994	Sht.†	AeG	Licht.-bg
Bethaus der Evangeliums-Christengemeinde Spandau en: Prayer House of the Gospel-Christian Congregation Spandau	Spandau	–	no namesake Germersheimer Weg	E: 2008	Sht.†	AeG	Spand.
Evangeliumskirche en: Church of the Gospel	Reinickendorf	–	Gospel Kamekestraße / Winterstraße / Hausotterplatz	E: 1955–1956	Luth.†	EKBO	Rein.-df
Fatih-Moschee en: Fatih Mosque	Luisenstadt	Fatih Camii (i.e. Fatih Mosque)	Fatih Sultan Mehmet Pfuelstraße	E: ?	Isl. Sun.	?	F-K
Fo-Guang-Shan-Tempel en: Fo Guang Shan Temple	Oranienburger Vorstadt	–	Fo Guang Shan Ackerstraße 85-86	E: 1993	Buddh.Mah.	FGS	Mitte
Französische Friedrichstadtkirche en: French Church of Friedrichstadt	Friedrichstadt	Französischer Dom (i.e. French Cathedral), Temple de la Friedrichstadt (fr; i.e. Protestant church of Friedrichstadt), Französische Kirche (i.e. French Church)	Friedrichstadt Gendarmenmarkt, listed building	E: 1701–1705; A: 1780–85 (tower); A: 1905; D: 1944; R: 1977–1981 (church); R: 1978–1983 (tower)	Sim. of Ref.† a. UP†	EKBO	Mitte
Französische Kirche (Alt-)Berlin en: French Church of (Old) Berlin	Klosterviertel	Französische Klosterkirche (i.e. French Cloister Church), Temple du Cloître (i.e. Fr. Protestant Cloister Church)	Franciscan Cloister backyard between Klosterstraße / Großer Jüdenhof, profaned in 1923	E: 1721–1726; D: 1944	removed last: Ref.†	last: APU	Mitte
Französische Luisenstadtkirche en: French Church of Luisenstadt	Luisenstadt	Französische Kapelle in der Cöllnischen Vorstadt (i.e. French Chapel in the Suburb of Colln), Temple de la Louisenstadt (i.e. Fr. Protestant church of Luisenstadt) since 1802	Luisenstadt Kommandantenstraße	E: 1700; N: 1728; D: 3 Febr. 1945; D: 1950 (ruin)	removed last: Ref.†	last: APU	F-K
Friedenskapelle en: Peace Chapel	Friedrichshagen	–	Peace Klutstraße	E: 1892	Bapt.†	UFC	T-K
Friedenskirche en: Peace Church	Charlottenburg	Eber-Ezer-Kapelle (i.e. Eben-Ezer Chapel) 1898–1908, a synagogue between 1908 and 1918, then Pentecostal	Peace Bismarckstraße, listed building	E: 1898	Bapt.†	UFC	C-W
Friedenskirche en: Peace Church	Friedenau	–	Peace Handjerystraße	E: 1949–1950	Meth.†	UMC	T-S
Friedenskirche en: Peace Church	Grünau	–	Peace Kochelseestraße / Eibseestraße, listed building	E: 1904–1906	Luth.†	EKBO	T-K
Friedenskirche en: Peace Church	Nieder- schöneweide	–	Peace Grünauer Straße / Britzer Straße, listed building	E: 1928–1930	Luth.†	EKBO	T-K
Friedenskirche en: Peace Church	Nieder- schönhausen	Dorfkirche Nieder- schönhausen (i.e. Nieder- schönhausen Village Church)	Peace Ossietzkyplatz / Dietzgenstraße, listed building	E: 1230; N: 1869–1871	Luth.†	EKBO	Pankow
Friedenskirche en: Peace Church	Weißensee	Tauf- und Beth-Kapelle der Bethabara-Beth Elim-Stiftung (i.e. Baptismal and Prayer Chapel of the Bethabara-Beth Elim Foundation)	Peace Albertinenstraße 20, listed building	E: 1903–1904; D: 1945; R: 1948	Luth.†	EKBO	T-K
Friedenskirche en: Peace Church	Westend	–	Peace Tannenbergallee, rebuilt as church 1928–1933	E: 1916; A: 1928–1932; D: 1944; R: 1947–1949	Luth.†	EKBO	C-W
Friedenskirche Zum Heiligen Sava en: Peace Church of the Holy Sava	Oranienburger Vorstadt	formerly Friedenskirche (i.e. Peace Church) as Lutheran church until when?	Saint Sava Ruppiner Straße, listed building	E: 1888–1891	Orth.†	SOC-D&G	Mitte
Friedenstempel en: Peace Temple	Halensee	–	Peace Markgraf-Albrecht-Straße 11	E: 1922–1923; D: 1938; D: 1959 (ruin)	removed last: Jew. Cons.	last: JGB	C-W
Friedrichswerder- sche Kirche en: Friedrichswerder Church	Friedrichswerder	Werdersche Kirche (i.e. Werder Church), Temple du Werder (i.e. Fr. Protestant Church of Werder)	Friedrichswerder Werderscher Markt, a museum since when?, listed building	E: 1699–1701; D: 1824; N: 1824–1830; D: 1945; R: 1982–1987	prof. last: UP†	last: APU	Mitte
Fürbittkirche en: Church of General Intercessions	Britz	–	General Intercessions Andreasberger Straße	E: 1964–1966	Luth.†	EKBO	Neuk.
Galiläakirche en: Galilee Church	Friedrichshain	–	Galilee Rigaer Straße, listed building, also used as Jugend-Widerstands-Museum (i.e. Youth Resistance Museum)	E: 1909–1910	Luth.† a. prof.	EKBO	F-K
Garnisonskirche Berlin en: Berlin Garrison Church	Heilig-Geist-Viertel	Alte Garnisonskirche (i.e. Old Garrison Church) after 1897	Garrison Anna-Louisa-Karsch-Straße (then Neue Friedrichstraße) / Spandauer Straße, void named Garnisonskirchplatz in 1999	E: 1701–1703; D: 1720; N: 1720–1722; A: 1863; D: 13 Apr. 1908; R: Aug. 1909; D: 23 Nov. 1943; D: 1962 (ruin)	removed last: Luth.†	last: APU	Mitte
Garnisonskirche Spandau en: Spandau Garrison Church	Spandau New Town	–	Garrison Neuendorfer Straße, near Hafenplatz	E: 1888; Dam: 1944? D: 1949	removed last: Luth.†	last: APU	Spand.
Gedenkkirche Maria Regina Martyrum en: Commemorative Church of Mary Queen of the Martyrs	Charlottenburg- Nord	–	Mary(am) of Nazareth Heckerdamm	E: 1960–1963	RC†	AB	C-W
Gemeindeheim Theodor Fliedner en: Theodor Fliedner Community Home	Mahlsdorf	Gemeindehaus Mahlsdorf-Süd (i.e. Mahlsdorf South Community Home)	Theodor Fliedner Schrobsdorffstraße, listed building	E: 1936–1937	Luth.†	EKBO	M-H
Gemeindezentrum Am Fennpfuhl en: Fennpfuhl Parish Hall	Fennpfuhl	–	no namesake Paul-Junius-Straße	E: 1982–1984	Luth.†	EKBO	Licht.-bg
Gemeindezentrum Hermann-Stöhr-Haus en: Hermann Stöhr Community Centre	Westend	Gemeindezentrum Grünes Dreieck (i.e. Congregation Centre Green Triangle)	Stöhr, Hermann Angerburger Allee	E: 1973–1975	Luth.†	EKBO	C-W
Gemeindezentrum Plötzensee en: Church of Plötzensee	Charlottenburg- Nord	–	Plötzensee Heckerdamm	E: 1968–1970	Luth.†	EKBO	C-W
Genezarethkirche en: Lake Gennesaret Church	Neukölln	–	Lake of Gennesaret Herrfurthplatz, spire shortened 1939–1940 and 1946–1948 for the approach path of Tempelhof Airport	E: 1903–1905; D: 29 Jan. 1945; R: 1955–1959	Luth.†	EKBO	Neuk.
Georgenkirche en: George Church	Königsstadt	–	George of Lydda Georgenkirchplatz, Georgenkirchstraße, streets completely redrawn	E: late 13th c. D: 1779; N: 1780; D: 1893; N: 1894–1898; D: 1944; D: 1951 (ruin)	removed last: Luth.†	last: APU	Mitte
Gethsemanekirche en: Gethsemane Church	Prenzlauer Berg	–	Gethsemane Greifenhagener Straße / Stargarder Straße, listed building	E: 1889–1893	Luth.†	EKBO	Pankow
Glaubenskirche en: Faith Church	Tempelhof	—	Faith Friedrich-Franz-Straße / Kaiserin-Augusta-Straße, listed building	E: 1914–1915	Luth.†	EKBO	T-S
Gnade-Christi-Kirche en: Grace of Christ Church	Borsigwalde	–	Grace of Jesus of Nazareth Tietzstraße, 1st a chapel only, then replaced by the present church	E: 1925; N: 1969–1970	Luth.†	EKBO	Rein.-df
Gnadenkirche en: Grace Church	Biesdorf	Dorfkirche Biesdorf (i.e. Biesdorf Village Church)	Grace Alt-Biesdorf	E: 2nd half of the 13th c.	Luth.†	EKBO	M-H
Gnadenkirche en: Grace Church	Oranienburger Vorstadt	Kaiserin-Augusta-Gedächtniskirche (i.e. Empress Augusta Memorial Church)	Grace Invalidenstraße, Invalidenpark	E: 1891–1895; D: 1944; D: 1967 (ruin)	removed last: Luth.†	last: APU	Mitte
Gnadenkirche en: Grace Church	Pichelsdorf	–	Grace Jaczostraße	E: 1946–1957	Luth.†	EKBO	Spand.
Golgathakirche en: Golgotha Church	Rosenthaler; Vorstadt	—	Golgotha Borsigstraße, listed building	E: 1898–1900	Luth.†	EKBO	Mitte
Grunewaldkirche en: Grunewald Church	Grunewald	–	Grunewald (forest) Bismarckallee / Wernerstraße	E: 1902–1904; D: 11 Mar. 1943; A: 1949; R: 1956–1959	Luth.†	EKBO	C-W
Gustav-Adolf-Kirche en: Gustavus Adophus Church	Charlottenburg	–	Gustavus Adolphus Brahestraße / Herschelstraße / Fabriciusstraße	E: 1932–1934; D: Sept. 1943, Febr. 1944; R: 1950–1960	Luth.†	EKBO	C-W
Haci Bayram-Moschee en: Haci Bayram Mosque	Gesundbrunnen	Hacı Bayram Camii (i.e. Haci Bayram Mosque)	Hacı Bayram-ı Veli Koloniestraße	E: ?	Isl. Sun.	?	Mitte
Heilandskirche en: Saviour's Church	Moabit	–	Saviour Thusnelda-Allee	E: 1892–1894; D: Nov. 1943; R: 1951–1960	Luth.†	EKBO	Mitte
Heilige-Drei-Könige-Kirche en: Three Wise Men Church	Rahnsdorf	–	Three Wise Men Grünheider Weg	E: 1933–1934	RC†	AB	T-K
Heilige-Familie-Kirche en: Holy Family Church	Lichterfelde	–	Holy Family Kornmesserstraße, listed building	E: 1902–1906	RC†	AB	S-Z
Heilige-Familie-Kirche en: Holy Family Church	Prenzlauer Berg	—	Holy Family Humannplatz, Wichertstraße, listed building	E: 1928–1930	RC†	AB	Pankow
Heiliger-Schutzengel-Kirche en: Holy Guardian Angel Church	Britz	–	Guardian angel Alt-Britz, listed building	E: 1959–1961	RC†	AB	Neuk.
Heilig-Geist-Kapelle en: Holy Spirit Chapel	Heilig-Geist-Viertel	Garnisonskirche (i.e. Garrison Church) between 1655 and 1703	Holy Spirit Spandauer Straße, listed building	E: by 1390	prof. last: Luth.†	last: APU	Mitte
Heilig-Geist-Kirche en: Holy Spirit Church	Moabit	Neue Johanniskirche (i.e. New John's Church) till 1907	Holy Spirit Perleberger Straße / Birkenstraße, listed building	E: 1905–1910	Luth.†	EKBO	Mitte
Heilig-Geist-Kirche en: Holy Spirit Church	Westend	–	Holy Spirit Bayernallee / Oldenburgallee	E: 1931–1932	RC†	AB	C-W
Heilig-Kreuz-Kirche en: Holy Cross Church	Alt-Hohen- schönhausen	–	Christian cross Malchower Weg	E: 1988	RC†	AB	Licht.-bg
Heilig-Kreuz-Kirche en: Holy Cross Church	Tempelhofer; Vorstadt	–	Christian cross Am Johannistisch / Blücherstraße / Zossener Straße, listed building	E: 1884–1888; D: Sept. 1943, Jan. 1945; R: 1951–1959	UP†	EKBO	F-K
Heilig-Kreuz-Kirche en: Holy Cross Church	Wilmersdorf	–	Christian cross Hildegardstraße	E: 1910–1912	RC†	AB	C-W
Hephatha-Kirche en: Ephphatha Church	Britz	–	Ephphatha (Imperial Aramaic: אתפתח or אפתח), Gospel of Mark 7:31–37; Fritz-Reuter-Allee	E: 1954–1955	Luth.†	EKBO	Neuk.
Herz-Jesu-Kapelle en: Sacred Heart of Jesus Chapel	Pankow	–	Sacred Heart Parkstraße, erected as garden house, chapel since 1900, listed building	E: by 1790; R: 1815; A: 1864; A: 1900	RC†	AB	Pankow
Herz-Jesu-Kirche en: Sacred Heart of Jesus Church	Biesdorf	Herz-Jesu-Kapelle (i.e. Sacred Heart of Jesus Chapel)	Sacred Heart Fortunaallee	E: 1913–1916	RC†	AB	M-H
Herz-Jesu-Kirche en: Sacred Heart of Jesus Church	Lietzow	–	Sacred Heart Alt-Lietzow	E: 1875–1877; D: 194? R: till 1962	RC†	AB	C-W
Herz-Jesu-Kirche en: Sacred Heart of Jesus Church	Prenzlauer Berg	–	Sacred Heart Fehrbelliner Straße / Schönhauser Allee, listed building	E: 1897–1899; Dam. 1945; R: 1948	RC†	AB	Pankow
Herz-Jesu-Kirche en: Sacred Heart of Jesus Church	Tegel	—	Sacred Heart Brunowstraße / Medebacher Straße, listed building	E: 1904–1905	RC†	AB	Rein.-df
Herz-Jesu-Kirche en: Sacred Heart of Jesus Church	Tempelhof	—	Sacred Heart Friedrich-Wilhelm-Straße, listed building	E: 1898	RC†	AB	T-S
Herz-Jesu-Kirche en: Sacred Heart of Jesus Church	Zehlendorf	–	Sacred Heart Riemeisterstraße, listed building	E: 1907–1908	RC†	AB	S-Z
Himmelfahrtskirche en: Ascension Church	Oranienburger Vorstadt	St. Izozoel Gemeinde (i.e. Mor Izozoel Congregation)	Ascension of Jesus Gustav-Meyer-Allee, also hosting the Syriac Orthodox St. Izozoel congregation, listed building	E: 1890–1893; D: 1945; D: 1949 (ruin); N: 1954–1956	Sim. of Luth.† a. Syr.	EKBO	Mitte
Hochmeisterkirche en: High Master Church	Halensee	–	High Master Paulsborner Straße / Hochmeisterplatz / Westfälische Straße / Nestorstraße	E: 1908–1910; D: 1943/1945; R: 1953–1958	Luth.†	EKBO	C-W
Hoffnungskirche en: Church of Hope	Pankow	–	Hope Elsa-Brandström-Straße / Trelleborger Straße, listed building	E: 1911–1913	Luth.†	EKBO	Pankow
Hoffnungskirche en: Church of Hope	Tegel	–	Hope Tile-Brügge-Weg	E: 1959–1960	Luth.†	EKBO	Rein.-df
Hofkirche en: Courtyard Church	Dammvorstadt	–	no namesake Bahnhofstraße 9, listed building	E: 1899–1900	Bapt.†	UFC	T-K
Imam Cafer Sadik-Moschee en: Imam Ja'far al-Sadiq Mosque	Gesundbrunnen	Imam Cafer Sadik Camii (i.e. Imam Ja'far al-Sadiq Mosque)	Ja'far al-Sadiq Koloniestraße	E: ?	Isl. Shi'a	?	Mitte
Immanuel-Kapelle en: Immanuel Chapel	Weißensee	–	Immanuel Friesickestraße 11	E: 1910	Bapt.†	UFC	Pankow
Immanuelkirche en: Immanuel Church	Prenzlauer Berg	–	Immanuel Immanuelkirchstraße / Prenzlauer Allee, listed building	E: 1892–1893	Luth.†	EKBO	Pankow
Jacobus-Gemeinde en: James Congregation	Lichtenrade	Kirche des Nazareners (i.e. Church of the Nazarene)	James, son of Zebedee John-Locke-Straße	E: 19??	Meth.-Ev.cal†	CN	T-S
Jeremiakirche en: Jeremiah Church	Falkenhagener Feld	Gemeindezentrum am Falkenhagener Feld	Jeremiah Burbacher Weg / Siegener Straße	E: 1964	Luth.†	EKBO	Spand.
Jerusalemskirche en: Jerusalem's Church	Friedrichstadt	Jerusalemer Kirche (i.e. Jerusalem Church)	Jerusalem Lindenstraße (Friedrichstadt)	E: 15th c. A: 1689; A: 1693–1695; N: 1728–1731; N: 1878–1879; D: 3 Febr. 1945; D: 1961 (ruin); N: 1967–1968	UP†	EKBO	F-K
Jesus-Christus-Kirche en: Jesus Christ Church	Dahlem	–	Jesus of Nazareth Faradayweg / Hittorfstraße, listed building	E: 1930–1931	Luth.†	EKBO	S-Z
Jesus-Christus-Kirche en: Jesus Christ Church	Konradshöhe	–	Jesus of Nazareth Schwarzspechtweg / Wildtaubenweg, listed building	E: 1937–1938	Luth.†	EKBO	Rein.-df
Jesuskirche en: Jesus Church	Kaulsdorf	Dorfkirche Kaulsdorf (i.e. Kaulsdorf Village Church)	Jesus of Nazareth Dorfstraße (Kaulsdorf); listed building	E: 2nd half of 13th c.	Luth.†	EKBO	M-H
Jesuskirche en: Jesus Church	Tempelhofer; Vorstadt	–	Jesus of Nazareth Kreuzbergstraße	E: 1868; N: 1876; D: 3 Febr. 1945; N: 1960–1961	closed since 1998 last: Luth.†	EKBO	F-K
Johann-Christoph-Blumhardt-Kirche en: Johann Christoph Blumhardt Church	Britz	–	Blumhardt, Johann Buckower Damm / Schlosserweg	E: 1963–1964	Luth.†	EKBO	Neuk.
Johanneskirche en: John Church	Frohnau	–	John the Evangelist Zeltinger Platz, listed building	E: 1934–1937	Luth.†	EKBO	Rein.-df
Johanneskirche en: John Church	Lichterfelde West	–	John the Evangelist Johanneskirchplatz / Pfleidererstraße / Ringstraße, listed building	E: 1913–1914	Luth.†	EKBO	S-Z
Johanneskirche en: John Church	Schlachtensee	–	John the Evangelist Matterhornstraße / Schopenhauerstraße, listed building	E: 1911–1912	Luth.†	EKBO	S-Z
Johannische Kirche Berlin en: Johannine Church	Kaulsdorf	–	no namesake Dorfstraße (Kaulsdorf), listed building	E: 1879; A: 1988–1991	JK†	JK	M-H
Johann-Sebastian-Bach-Kirche en: Johann Sebastian Bach Church	Lichterfelde	Gemeindezentrum Johann Sebastian Bach (i.e. Johann Sebastian Bach Community Centre) before 1980	Bach, Johann Sebastian Thuner Platz	E: 1967; N: 1980–1981	Luth.†	EKBO	S-Z
Jonakirche en: Jonah Church	Witzleben	—	Jonah the Prophet Roscherstraße / Herbartstraße	E: 1965–1967	Luth.†	EKBO	C-W
Kaiser-Friedrich-Gedächtniskirche en: Emperor Frederick Memorial Church	Hansaviertel	–	Frederick III Händelallee, listed building	E: 1892–1895; D: 1943; N: 1956–1957	Luth.†	EKBO	Mitte
Kaiser-Wilhelm-Gedächtniskirche en: Emperor William Memorial Church	Charlottenburg	Gedächtniskirche (i.e. Memorial Church); Hohler Zahn (i.e. hollow tooth) as nickname for the ruined old tower	William I Breitscheidplatz, second preaching venue of the chairing pastor (bishop) of EKBO	E: 1891–1895; D: 22 Nov. 1943; N: 1959–1963	UP†	EKBO	C-W
Kapelle der Heilanstalten in Buch en: Chapel of the Buch Sanatoriums	Buch	–	Hospital pertaining on the hospital campus	E: 1906–1908	Chr.†	hospital owned	Pankow
Kapelle der Mavuno Kirche en: Chapel of the Mavuno Church	Lichterfelde	McNair Community Chapel (after Lesley McNair), since 9 July 2006 sold to the Mavuno Church	Mavuno Billy-Wilder-Promenade	E: 1947	Chr.†	UFC	S-Z
Kapelle der Versöhnung en: Chapel of Reconciliation	Rosenthaler; Vorstadt	Versöhnungskapelle (i.e. Reconciliation Chapel), Versöhnungskirche (i.e. Reconciliation Church) till 1985, church stood in the cleared East German border zone (like Sankt-Franziskus-Kirche, West Staaken), the church was demolished by the end of 1985 following a command by the GDR government	Reconciliation Bernauer Straße	E: 1892–1894; D: 1985; N: 1999–2000	Luth.†	EKBO	Mitte
Kapelle des Rudolf-Virchow-Krankenhauses en: Chapel of the Rudolf Virchow Hospital	Wedding	–	Hospital pertaining on the hospital campus	E: 1899–1906; D: 31 Aug. 1943; N: 1966	Chr.†	hospital owned	Mitte
Kapelle im Bethanienkrankenhaus en: Chapel in the Bethany Hospital	Luisenstadt	–	no namesake Mariannenplatz, listed building, profaned since 1967	E: 1845–1847	prof. last: Luth.†	last: EKBO	F-K
Kapelle im Diakonissenmutterhaus Bethel en: Chapel in the Bethel Deaconesses' Motherhouse	Moabit	Bethaniakapelle (i.e. Bethany Chapel) after the Baptist Bethania Congregation using the chapel between 1899 and 1943	Bethel Emdener Straße 15, Bethania Congregation moved to Waldstraße 32 (Moabit)	E: 1899; D: 22 Nov. 1943	removed last: Bapt.†	last: UFC	Mitte
Kapelle im St. Theresienstift en: Chapel in the Theresienstift Foundation	Zehlendorf	–	no namesake Altvaterstraße	E: 1987–1989	RC†	AB	S-Z
Kapelle Zu den Vier Aposteln en: Chapel of the Four Apostles	Mariendorf	–	Four Apostles Rixdorfer Straße	E: 1967–1968	Luth.†	EKBO	T-S
Kapernaumkirche en: Capernaum Church	Wedding	–	Capernaum Seestraße / Antwerpener Straße, listed building	E: 1901–1902; D: 1944/1945; R: 1952–1959	Luth.†	EKBO	Mitte
Kathedralkirche St. Boris des Täufers en: St. Boris the Baptist Cathedral	Neukölln	–	Boris I of Bulgaria Hermannstraße, originally cemetery chapel by Louis Arndt	E: 1899–1900; A: 2004	Orth.†	BOC	Neuk.
Katholisch-Apostolische Kirche Berlin Süd en: Catholic Apostolic Church of Berlin South	Tempelhofer; Vorstadt	–	no namesake Wilmsstraße, listed building	E: 1898–1901	CA†	CAC	F-K
Katholisch-Apostolische Kirche Berlin West en: Catholic Apostolic Church of Berlin West	Tiergarten	–	no namesake Pohlstraße	E: 1894	CA†	CAC	Mitte
Katholisch-Apostolische Kirche Rixdorf en: Catholic Apostolic Church of Rixdorf	Rixdorf	–	no namesake Kopfstraße, listed building	E: ?	CA†	CAC	Neuk.
Katholisch-Apostolische Kirche en: Catholic Apostolic Church of Spandau	Spandau	–	no namesake Ackerstraße, listed building	E: 1896	CA†	CAC	Spand.
Khadija-Moschee en: Khadija Mosque	Heinersdorf	Chadidscha-Moschee, Masjid Khadija (i.e. both Khadija Mosque)	Khadijah bint Khuwaylid	E: 2007–2008	Isl. Sun.	AMC	Pankow
Kirche am Hohenzollernplatz en: Church on Hohenzollernplatz square	Wilmersdorf	Kraftwerk Gottes (i.e. Powerhouse of God), nickname	Hohenzollernplatz square Hohenzollerndamm / Nassauische Straße / Nikolsburger Straße	E: 1931–1933; D: 1943; R: till 1965	Luth.†	EKBO	C-W
Kirche am Immanuelkrankenhaus en: Church at Immanuel Hospital	Wannsee	–	no namesake Königstraße	E: 1993	Bapt.†	UFC	S-Z
Kirche am Lietzensee en: Church on Lake Lietzensee	Witzleben	–	Lietzensee lake Herbartstraße,	E: 1919–1920; D: 15 Febr. 1944; N: 1957–1959	Luth.†	EKBO	C-W
Kirche am Seggeluchbecken en: Church at Seggeluch Bassin	Märkisches Viertel	–	Seggeluch (a local swamp) Finsterwalder Straße	E: 1969–1972	Luth.†	EKBO	Rein.-df
Kirche am Stölpchensee en: Church on Lake Stölpchensee	Stolpe	Dorfkirche Stolpe (i.e. Stolpe Village Church)	Stölpchensee Wilhelmplatz, listed building	E: by 1400; D: 1854; N: 1858–1859	Luth.†	EKBO	S-Z
Kirche am Südstern en: Church on Südstern square	Tempelhofer; Vorstadt	Neue Garnisonskirche (i.e. New Garrison Church) for Protestant soldiers	no namesake Südstern, listed building	E: 1893–1897	Chr.†	Fr. ch.	F-K
Kirche auf dem Tempelhofer Feld en: Church on the Tempelhof Field	Neu-Tempelhof	–	no namesake Wolffring / Badener Ring, listed building	E: 1927–1928; D: 1945; R: 1950	Luth.†	EKBO	T-S
Kirche der Christen- gemeinschaft en: Church of the Christengemeinschaft	Wilmersdorf	–	no namesake Ruhrstraße	E: 1962	Chr.†	Fr. ch.	C-W
Kirche der Christian Church Outreach Mission en: Church of the Christian Church Outreach Mission	Lichtenrade	Kirche Zu den heiligen Märtyrern von Afrika (i.e. Church of the Holy Martyrs of Africa) before 2008	no namesake Schwebelstraße, listed building	E: 1976–1977	PC†	COM	T-S
Kirche der Ersten Kirche Christi, Wissenschafter en: First Church of Christ, Scientist	Wilmersdorf	—	no namesake Wilhelmsaue	E: 1936–1937; D: 1943; R: 1956–1957	CS†	1stCC	C-W
Kirche der Evangelisch-Freikirchlichen Gemeinde en: Church of the Evangelical Free Church Congregati	Tempelhof	–	no namesake Borussiastraße / Tempelhofer Damm 133–137	E: 1961	Bapt.†	UFC	T-S
Kirche der Heiligen Dreifaltigkeit en: Church of the Holy Trinity	Tempelhof	Zinzendorfkirche (i.e. Zinzendorf Church) until 2008	Trinity, formerly Zinzendorf, Nicolaus Ludwig Schwanheimer Straße 11	E: 1956	Orth.†	SOC-D&G	T-S
Kirche der Königlich Preußischen Hauptkadettenanstalt en: Church of the Royal Prussian Main Cadet Corps	Lichterfelde West	Kadettendom (i.e. Cadet Cathedral)	no namesake Finckensteinallee	E: 1873–1878; D: 1945; D: 1953 (ruin)	removed last: UP†	last: APU	S-Z
Kirche des Heiligen Nikolaus en: Church of the Holy Nicholas	Tempelhofer; Vorstadt	Sankt-Raphaelsstift (i.e. St. Raphael's Foundation), till 1963 chapel of that foundation	Nicholas of Myra Mittenwalder Straße	E: 1910	prof. last: GC†	private	F-K
Kirche im Gemeinwesenzentrum en: Church in the Community Centre	Staaken	–	no namesake Maulbeerallee / Obstallee	E: 1976–1977	Luth.†	EKBO	Spand.
Kirche im Johannesstift en: Church in the Johannesstift Foundation	Hakenfelde	Stiftskirche (i.e. Church of the Foundation)	John the Evangelist Schönwalder Allee, listed building	E: 1907–1910	Luth.†	EKBO	Spand.
Kirche im Katharinenstift en: Church in Katharinenstift Foundation	Prenzlauer Berg	Sankt-Gertrud-Kirche (i.e. St. Gertrude Church)	Gertrude of Nivelles Greifswalder Straße, originally chapel of the Katharinenstift foundation, listed building	E: 1895–1896	RC†	AB	Pankow
Kirche im Waldkrankenhaus en: Church of Waldkrankenhaus	Falkenhagener Feld	–	no namesake Stadtrandstraße	E: 1976	Luth.†	EKBO	Spand.
Kirche Jesu Christi der Heiligen der letzten Tage en: Church of Jesus Christ of Latter-day Saints	Biesdorf	–	no namesake Alwineweg	E: ?	Morm.†	CJCLS	M-H
Kirche Jesu Christi der Heiligen der letzten Tage en: Church of Jesus Christ of Latter-day Saints	Dahlem	–	no namesake Pacelliallee	E: ?	Morm.†	CJCLS	S-Z
Kirche Jesu Christi der Heiligen der letzten Tage en: Church of Jesus Christ of Latter-day Saints	Lankwitz	–	no namesake Kaulbachstraße	E: ?	Morm.†	CJCLS	S-Z
Kirche Jesu Christi der Heiligen der letzten Tage en: Church of Jesus Christ of Latter-day Saints	Buckow	–	no namesake Kolibriweg	E: ?	Morm.†	CJCLS	Neukölln
Kirche Jesu Christi der Heiligen der letzten Tage en: Church of Jesus Christ of Latter-day Saints	Spandau	–	no namesake Hügelschanze	E: ?	Morm.†	CJCLS	Spandau
Kirche Jesu Christi der Heiligen der letzten Tage en: Church of Jesus Christ of Latter-day Saints	Tiergarten	–	no namesake Klingelhöferstraße	E: 1972–1973	Morm.†	CJCLS	Mitte
Kirche Johannisthal en: Johannisthal Church	Johannisthal	–	Johannisthal Sterndamm; opened in the former garden restaurant Kaiser-Wilhelm-Garten	E: 1??? A: 1921	Luth.†	EKBO	T-K
Kirche Maria Frieden en: Church of Mary of Peace	Mariendorf	–	Queen of Peace Kaiserstraße, listed building	E: 1919; N: 1934; N: 1968–1969	RC†	AB	T-S
Kirche Maria Königin des Friedens en: Church of Mary Queen of Peace	Biesdorf	–	Queen of Peace Oberfeldstraße	E: 1981–1984	RC†	AB	M-H
Kirche Nikolassee en: Nikolassee Church	Nikolassee	–	no namesake Kirchweg, listed building	E: 1909–1910	Luth.†	EKBO	S-Z
Kirche Nordend en: Nordend Church	Nordend	–	Nordend (i.e. North End), a neighbourhood in Rosenthal, Berlin Schönhauser Straße / Kirchstraße, listed building	E: 1909–1910	Luth.†	EKBO	Pankow
Kirche Sanctissimum Corpus Christi en: Church of the Holiest Corpus Christi	Prenzlauer Berg	Corpus-Christi-Kirche (i.e. Corpus Christi Church)	Corpus Christi Conrad-Blenkle-Straße, listed building	E: 1904–1920	RC†	AB	Pankow
Kirche Sankt Mariae Verkündigung en: Church of the Annunciation of Mary	Westend	–	Annunciation Bayernallee / Oldenburgallee / Preußenallee	E: 1933–1937	RC†	AB	C-W
Kirche Sankt Maria, Hilfe der Christen en: Church of St. Mary Help of Christians	Spandau New Town	–	Mary Help of Christians Flankenschanze / Galenstraße / Hasenmark, listed building	E: 1908–1910	RC†	AB	Spand.
Kirche Sankt Maria von der Unbefleckten Empfängnis en: Church of St. Mary of the Immaculate Conception	Wilmersdorf	Sankt-Marien-Kirche (i.e. St. Mary's Church)	Immaculate Conception Bergheimer Platz / Laubacher Straße / Schwalbacher Straße	E: 1913–1914	RC†	AB	C-W
Kirche Sankt Marien von der Unbefleckten Empfängnis en: Church of St. Mary of the Immaculate Conception	Karlshorst	Sankt-Marien-Kirche (i.e. St. Mary's Church)	Immaculate Conception Gundelfinger Straße / Marksburgstraße, listed building	E: 1935–1936	RC†	AB	Licht.-bg
Kirche Schönow en: Schönow Church	Schönow	–	no namesake Andréezeile, listed building	E: 1960–1961	Luth.†	EKBO	S-Z
Kirche (und Kloster) Vom Guten Hirten en: Church (and Monastery) of the Good Shepherd	Marienfelde	–	Good Shepherd Malteserstraße, listed building	E: 1903–1905	RC†	AB	T-S
Kirche Von der Auferstehung Christi en: Church of the Resurrection of Christ	Lankwitz	–	Resurrection of Jesus Kamenzer Damm	E: 1970	RC†	AB	S-Z
Kirche Von der Verklärung des Herrn en: Church of the Transfiguration of the Lord	Marzahn	–	Transfiguration of Jesus Neufahrwasserweg	E: 1984–1987	RC†	AB	M-H
Kirche zu den Erzengeln Michael und Gabriel en: Church of the Archangels Michael and Gabriel	Westend	–	Michael (archangel) and Gabriel (archangel) Ortelsburger Allee / Heerstraße; the congregation established in 1940, owning and using the former Jerusalem's Church from 1943 till its destruction in 1945	E: 2009-2013	Orth.†	Romanian Orthodox Church	C-W
Kirche Zu den Heiligen Zwölf Aposteln en: Church of the Holy Twelve Apostles	Nikolassee	–	Twelve Apostles Wasgenstraße	E: 1954	RC†	AB	S-Z
Kirche Zu den Vier Evangelisten en: Church of the Four Evangelists	Pankow	Dorfkirche Pankow (i.e. Pankow Village Church), Alte Pfarrkirche (i.e. old parish church)	Four Evangelists Breite Straße, listed building	E: 1st half of 15th c. A: 1858–1859	Luth.†	EKBO	Pankow
Kirche Zum Guten Hirten en: Church of the Good Shepherd	Friedenau	—	Good Shepherd Friedrich-Wilhelm-Platz, listed building	E: 1891–1894	Luth.†	EKBO	T-S
Kirche Zum Guten Hirten en: Church of the Good Shepherd	Friedrichsfelde	–	Good Shepherd Kurze Straße	E: 1906–1907; N: 1985	RC†	AB	Licht.-bg
Kirche Zum Heiligen Kreuz en: Church of the Holy Cross	Wilmersdorf	—	Christian cross Nassauische Straße	E: 1908; D: 1943/1944; R: till 1858	Luth.†	SELK	C-W
Kirche zum Heilsbronnen en: Church of the Dwell of Salvation	Bayerisches Viertel	–	Dwell of Salvation Heilbronner Straße, listed building, 1st Berlin parish of Otto Dibelius	E: 1910–1913; D: 1943; R: 1949–1956	Luth.†	EKBO	T-S
Kirche Zum Vaterhaus en: Church of the Father's House	Baumschulenweg	–	God the Father (cf. John 14:2) Baumschulenstraße / Mörikestraße, listed building	E: 1910–1912	Luth.†	EKBO	T-K
Kirche Zur frohen Botschaft en: Church of the Gospel	Karlshorst	–	Gospel Weseler Straße / Königswinterstraße / Lahnsteiner Straße / Sinziger Straße, listed building	E: 1909–1910	Luth.†	EKBO	Licht.-bg
Kirche Zur Heiligen Dreifaltigkeit en: Church of the Holy Trinity	Friedrichshain	Dreifaltigkeitskirche (i.e. Trinity Church)	Trinity Böcklinstraße, listed building	E: 1912–1915; D: 26 Febr. 1945; R: 1948	RC†	AB	F-K
Kirche zur Heimat en: Church of the Homeland	Zehlendorf	–	no namesake Heimat, listed building	E: 1956–1957	Luth.†	EKBO	S-Z
Kirche Zur Wiederkunft Christi en: Church of the Return of Christ	Südende	Südendkirche (i.e. Southend Church) before July 1961	Return of Christ Ellwanger Straße	E: 1911–1913; D: 24 Mar. 1944; R: 1957–1958	Luth.†	EKBO	S-Z
Kirchsaal der Brüdergemeine en: Church Hall of the Moravian Brethren	Friedrichstadt	–	no namesake Wilhelmstraße 138	E: 1751; N: 1857; D: 1944; N: 1948; D: 1960?	removed last: Morav.†	last: UF	F-K
Kirchsaal der Brüdergemeine en: Church Hall of the Moravian Brethren	Spandauer Vorstadt	–	no namesake Kalkscheuenenstraße / Ziegelstraße, profaned since 1991?	E: 1963	prof. last: Morav.†	last: UF	Mitte
Klosterkirche en: Cloister Church / Monastery Church	Klosterviertel	Franziskaner-Klosterkirche (i.e. Franciscan Cloister Church)	buried in oblivion Klosterstraße / Littenstraße, ruin is a listed building	E: by 1250; D: 3 Apr. 1945	ruin last: Luth.†	last: APU	Mitte
Königin-Luise-Gedächtniskirche en: Queen Louise Memorial Church	Rote Insel	–	Louise of Mecklenburg-Strelitz Gustav-Müller-Platz, listed building	E: 1910–1912	Luth.†	EKBO	T-S
Königin-Luise-Kirche en: Queen Louise Church	Waidmannslust	–	Louise of Mecklenburg-Strelitz Bondickstraße / Hochjagdstraße, listed building	E: 1912–1913	Luth.†	EKBO	Rein.-df
Königreichssaal Neukölln West en: Neukölln West Kingdom Hall	Rixdorf	Synagoge Rixdorf en: Rixdorf Synagogue	no namesake Isarstraße 8; a Vereinssynagoge (i.e. synagogue of the private association Jüdische Brüder-Gemeinde Neukölln), after Nazism past on to Jehovah's Witnesses	E: 1907; Dam: 1938?	JW†	?	Neuk.
Königreichssaal Prinzenallee en: Prinzenallee Kingdom Hall	Gesundbrunnen	Synagoge Prinzenallee (i.e. Prinzenallee Synagogue), a Vereinssynagoge (i.e. synagogue of the private association Ahavas Achim אהבת אחים) between 1910 and 1938, then closed after vandalisation	no namesake Prinzenallee 87, profaned in the 1970s	E: by 1860; A: 1910; D: 1938; A: 1956–1957	prof. last: JW†	?	Mitte
Königreichssaal Reinickendorf en: Reinickendorf Kingdom Hall	Reinickendorf	-	no namesake Humboldtstraße	E: 19??	JW†	?	Rein.-df
Konventskirche des Sankt Josefsheim en: Convent Church of St. Joseph's Home	Prenzlauer Berg	–	Joseph of Nazareth Greifenhagener Straße / Pappelallee / Stargarder Straße, listed building	E: 1894–1896	RC†	AB	Pankow
Korneliuskirche en: Cornelius Church	Wedding	–	Cornelius the Centurion Dubliner Straße	E: 1975	Luth.†	EKBO	Mitte
Krankenhauskirche en: Hospital Church	Biesdorf	–	Hospital pertaining Brebacher Weg, listed building	E: 1890–1893; A: 1997	Luth.†	EKBO	M-H
Kreuzkirche en: Cross Church	Mahlsdorf	–	Christian cross Albrecht-Dürer-Straße / Pfarrhufenweg, listed building	E: 1934–1936	Luth.†	EKBO	M-H
Kreuzkirche en: Cross Church	Schmargendorf	–	Christian cross Hohenzollerndamm / Forckenbeckstraße	E: 1928–1929	Luth.†	EKBO	C-W
Laurentiuskirche en: Lawrence Church	Wilhelmstadt	–	Lawrence of Rome Heerstraße	E: 1956–1958	Luth.†	EKBO	Spand.
Lazaruskapelle des Lazarus-Kranken- und Diakonissenhauses en: Lazarus Chapel of the Lazarus Hospital and Deaconesses' Institution	Oranienburger Vorstadt	–	Lazarus of Bethany Bernauer Straße	E: 1865	Luth.†	EKBO	Mitte
Lazaruskirche en: Lazarus Church	Friedrichshain	–	Lazarus of Bethany Grünberger Straße / Kadiner Straße	E: 1905–1907; D: 13 Apr. 1945; D: 1949 (ruin)	removed last: Luth.†?	last: APU	F-K
Liebfrauenkirche en: Our Lady Church	Luisenstadt	Sankt-Marien-Kirche (i.e. St. Mary's Church)	Mary(am) of Nazareth Wrangelstraße, listed building	E: 1904–1906	RC†	AB	F-K
Lietzowkirche en: Lietzow Church	Lietzow	Kirche Alt-Lietzow (i.e. Old Lietzow Church); Dorfkirche Lietzow (i.e. Lietzow Village Church)	no namesake Alt-Lietzow	E: 15th c. D: 1640s N: 1655; N: 1848–1850; N: 1910–1911; D: 22 Nov. 1943; N: 1960–1962	Luth.†	EKBO	C-W
Lindenkirche en: Linden Church	Wilmersdorf	–	linden Binger Straße / Homburger Straße / Johannisberger Straße	E: 1934–1936	Luth.†	EKBO	C-W
Linh Thứu Pagode en: Linh Thứu Pagoda	Spandau	–	? Heidereuterstraße 30, Buddhist Vietnamese congregation	E: ?	Buddh.	?	Spand.
Lippmann-Tauß-Synagoge en: Lippmann-Tauss Synagogue	Königsstadt	–	Wulff, Liepmann Meyer; called Tauß last: Friedensstraße 3 (1937–1939), Gollnowstraße 12 (about today's Mollstr., 1893–1937)	E: 1776; N: 1893; N: 1937	prof. last: Jew. Orth.	last: JGB	Mitte
Luisenkirche	Charlottenburg	Parochialkirche (i.e. Parochial Church) as opposed to the palace chapel till 1826	Louise of Mecklenburg-Strelitz Gierkeplatz	E: 1712–1716; D: Sept. 1943; R: 1950–1956	UP†?	EKBO	C-W
Luisenstäd- tische Kirche en: Luisenstadt Church	Luisenstadt	Sebastiankirche (i.e. Sebastian Church), Luisenstadtkirche (i.e. Luisenstadt Church)	Nethe, Sebastian, city councillor and presbyter Sebastianstraße / Alte Jakobstraße, memorial	E: 1695; A: 1753; D: 3 Febr. 1945; D: 1964 (ruin)	removed last: Luth.†	last: APU	Mitte
Lukaskirche en: Luke Church	Steglitz	–	Luke the Evangelist Friedrichsruher Straße / Friedrichsruher Platz / Schönhauser Straße, listed building	E: 1907–1908	Luth.†	EKBO	S-Z
Lutherkirche en: Luther Church	Schöneberg	–	Luther, Martin Bülowstraße / Dennewitzplatz, listed building, also hosting the American Church in Berlin, little damage in the war	E: 1891–1894; D: Nov. 1943; R: 1959–1960	Luth.†	ACB	T-S
Lutherkirche en: Luther Church	Spandau	–	Luther, Martin Lutherplatz, listed building	E: 1895–1896	Luth.†	EKBO	Spand.
Lutherkirche en: Luther Church	Wilhelmsruh	–	Luther, Martin Goethestraße / Hielscherstraße, listed building	E: 1905–1907	Luth.†	EKBO	Pankow
Magdalenenkirche en: Magdalene's Church	Rixdorf	–	Mary Magdalene Karl-Marx-Straße / Kirchhofstraße, listed building	E: 1877–1879	Luth.†	EKBO	Neuk.
Maria-Gnaden-Kirche en: Mary of Grace Church	Hermsdorf	–	Our Lady of Grace Hermsdorfer Damm / Olafstraße, listed building	E: 1933–1934	RC†	AB	Rein.-df
Maria-Hilf-Kirche en: St. Mary of Help Church	Altglienicke	–	Mary Help of Christians Lianenweg / Cimbernstraße	E: 1937	RC†	AB	T-K
Mariä-Himmelfahrt-Kirche en: Assumption of Mary Church	Kladow	–	Assumption of Mary Sakrower Landstraße first building in Kindlebenstraße	E: 1954; N: 1986–1987	RC†	AB	Spand.
Maria-Schutz-Kirche en: Intercession of Mary Church	Lietzow	–	Protection of the Mother of God Wintersteinstraße 24	E: 2008	Orth.†	ROCOR	C-W
Markuskirche en: Mark Church	Südende	–	Mark the Evangelist Markusplatz	E: 1911–1912; D: 24 Aug. 1943; R: 1949–1954	Luth.†	EKBO	S-Z
Marthakirche en: Martha Church	Luisenstadt	–	Martha Glogauer Straße, listed building	E: 1902–1904	Luth.†	EKBO	F-K
Martin-Luther-Gedächtniskirche en: Martin Luther Memorial Church	Mariendorf	–	Luther, Martin Kaiserstraße / Rathausstraße / Riegerzeile, listed building	E: 1933–1935	Luth.†	EKBO	T-S
Martin-Luther-Kapelle en: Martin Luther Chapel	Köpenick	–	Luther, Martin Eitelsdorfer Straße	E: 1933–1934	Luth.†	EKBO	T-K
Martin-Luther-King-Kirche en: Martin Luther King Church	Gropiusstadt	–	King Jr., Martin Luther Johannisthaler Chaussee	E: 1966–1968	Luth.†	EKBO	Neuk.
Martin-Luther-Kirche en: Martin Luther Church	Gesundbrunnen	–	Luther, Martin Wollankstraße, erected for the West Berlin parishioners of the cross-border congregation with its 'Kirche Zu den Vier Evangelisten' in East Berlin	E: 1962–1963; D: 2004	removed last: Luth.†	EKBO	Mitte
Martin-Luther-Kirche en: Martin Luther Church	Lichterfelde	–	Luther, Martin Tulpenstraße / Hortensienstraße, listed building	E: 1930–1936; D: Pentecost, 28 May 1944; R: 1947	Luth.†	EKBO	S-Z
Martin-Luther-Kirche en: Martin Luther Church	Neukölln	–	Luther, Martin Fuldastraße, listed building	E: 1907–1910; D: 29 Jan. 1944; R: till 1957	Luth.†	EKBO	Neuk.
Martinuskirche en: Martin Church	Tegel	–	Luther, Martin Sterkrader Straße / Namslaustraße, listed building	E: 1962–1963	Luth.†	EKBO	Rein.-df
Mater-Dolorosa-Kirche en: Mater Dolorosa Church	Buch	–	Our Lady of Sorrows Röbellweg / Pölnitzweg, listed building	E: 1934–1935	RC†	AB	Pankow
Mater-Dolorosa-Kirche en: Mater Dolorosa Church	Lankwitz	–	Our Lady of Sorrows Kurfürstenstraße, listed building	E: 1910–1912; D: 23/24 Aug 1943; A: 1950; R: 1968–1970; R: 1983–1984	RC†	AB	S-Z
Matthäuskirche en: Matthew Church	Steglitz	Dorfkirche Steglitz (i.e. Steglitz Village Church) before 1912	Matthew the Evangelist Schlossstraße / Rothenburgstraße, listed building	E: 12th c. D: 1881; N: 1876–1880	Luth.†	EKBO	S-Z
Matthias-Claudius-Kirche en: Matthias Claudius Church	Heiligensee	–	Claudius, Matthias Schulzendorfer Straße / Damkitzstraße	E: 1937–1938	Luth.†	EKBO	Rein.-df
Melanchthonkirche en: Melanchthon Church	Tempelhofer; Vorstadt	–	Melanchthon, Philipp Planufer, Arnim Kröger (1906), Fritz Buck (1955)	E: 1904–1907; D: 1943/1944; N: 1954–1955	Luth.†	EKBO	F-K
Melanchthonkirche en: Melanchthon Church	Wilhelmstadt	British garrison church between 1945 and 1954	Melanchthon, Philipp Melanchthonplatz / Wilhelmstraße, listed building	E: 1893	Luth.†	EKBO	Spand.
Mevlana-Moschee en: Mewlānā Mosque	Luisenstadt	Mevlana Camii (i.e. Mewlānā Mosque)	Mewlānā Skalitzer Straße	A: 1976	Isl. Sun.	MG	F-K
Michaelskirche en: Michael's Church	Schöneberg	–	Michael (archangel) Bessemerstraße / Eythstraße, listed building	E: 1955–1956	Luth.†	EKBO	T-S
Mor-Afrem-Kirche en: St. Ephraim Church	Charlottenburg	Mariä-Himmelfahrt-Kirche (i.e. Assumption of Mary Church) before 2005	Ephraim the Syrian Mindener Straße / Mierendorffplatz	E: 1925–1926; D: 1964; N: 1964–1966	Orth.†	Syr.	C-W
Nathanaelkirche en: Nathaniel Church	Schöneberg	–	Nathanael Grazer Platz, listed building	E: 1902–1903; D: 1943–1945; R: 1950s	Luth.†	EKBO	T-S
Nathan-Söderblom-Kirche en: Nathan Söderblom Church	Klosterfelde	–	Söderblom, Nathan Ulrikenstraße	E: 1968	Luth.†	EKBO	Spand.
Nazarethkirche en: Nazareth Church	Wedding	alte Nazarethkirche (i.e. old Nazareth Church)	Nazareth Leopoldplatz / Müllerstraße, architect Karl Friedrich Schinkel	E: 1832–1834	Luth.†	EKBO	Mitte
Neuapostolische Kirche Britz en: Britz New Apostolic Church	Britz	–	no namesake Backbergstraße	E: ?	NA†	NAC	Neuk.
Neuapostolische Kirche in Charlottenburg en: New Apostolic Church in Charlottenburg	Charlottenburg	–	no namesake Wilmersdorfer Straße 141	E: ?	NA†	NAC	C-W
Neuapostolische Kirche in Charlottenburg-Nord en: New Apostolic Church in Charlottenburg North	Charlottenburg	–	no namesake Nordhausener Straße / Wernigeroder Straße	E: 1929–1930	NA†	NAC	C-W
Neuapostolische Kirche in Haselhorst en: New Apostolic Church in Haselhorst	Haselhorst	–	no namesake Gartenfelder Straße	E: ?	NA†	NAC	Spand.
Neuapostolische Kirche Humboldthain en: Humboldthain New Apostolic Church	Oranienburger Vorstadt	–	no namesake Hussitenstraße	E: ?	NA†	NAC	Mitte
Neuapostolische Kirche in Kaulsdorf en: New Apostolic Church in Kaulsdorf	Kaulsdorf	–	no namesake Alt-Kaulsdorf, listed building	E: 1888; N: 1960	NA†	NAC	M-H
Neuapostolische Kirche in Kladow en: New Apostolic Church in Kladow	Kladow	–	no namesake Sakrower Landstraße	E: ?	NA†	NAC	Spand.
Neuapostolische Kirche in Köpenick en: New Apostolic Church in Köpenick	Köpenick	–	no namesake Zu den sieben Raben	E: ?????	NA†	NAC	T-K
Neuapostolische Kirche in Lichtenberg en: New Apostolic Church in Lichtenberg	Friedrichsfelde	–	no namesake Wönnichstraße / Münsterlandplatz, first building in Normannenstraße	E: 1932; N: 1977–1979	NA†	NAC	Licht.-bg
Neuapostolische Kirche in Moabit en: New Apostolic Church in Moabit	Moabit	–	no namesake Perleberger Straße 43, the church was profaned and is housing the Tajik Embassy since 2008	E: ?	prof. last: NA†	last: NAC	Mitte
Neuapostolische Kirche Neukölln II in Britz en: Neukölln II New Apostolic Church in Britz	Britz	Tagungs- und Begegnungsstätte Neukölln (i.e. Neukölln centre of conventions and encounters)	no namesake Rungiusstraße / Bürgerstraße, the church is now used as a New Apostolic Church centre for conventions and encounters	E: ?	prof. last: NA†	last: NAC	Neuk.
Neuapostolische Kirche in Prenzlauer Berg en: New Apostolic Church in Prenzlauer Berg	Prenzlauer Berg	–	no namesake Zelterstraße / Dunckerstraße, listed building	E: 1933–1934	NA†	NAC	Pankow
Neuapostolische Kirche in Reinickendorf en: New Apostolic Church in Reinickendorf	Reinickendorf	–	no namesake Romanshorner Weg / Gotthardstraße	E: 1959–1960	NA†	NAC	Rein.-df
Neuapostolische Kirche in Schöneberg en: New Apostolic Church in Schöneberg	Schöneberg	–	no namesake Erfurter Straße	E: 1926–1928	NA†	NAC	T-S
Neuapostolische Kirche in Spandau en: New Apostolic Church in Spandau	Hakenfelde	–	no namesake Triftstraße / Krienickesteig	E: 1934–1935	NA†	NAC	Spand.
Neuapostolische Kirche in Treptow en: New Apostolic Church in Treptow	Alt-Treptow	–	no namesake Schmollerplatz 3	E: ?	NA†	NAC	T-K
Neuapostolische Kirche in Weißensee en: New Apostolic Church in Weißensee	Weißensee	–	no namesake Gartenstraße, listed building	E: 1931–1932	NA†	NAC	Pankow
Neuapostolische Kirche in Zehlendorf en: New Apostolic Church in Zehlendorf	Zehlendorf	–	no namesake Leo-Baeck-Straße 5 / Leuchtenburgstraße	E: ? A: 2007	NA†	NAC	S-Z
Neue Kapelle des Evangelischen Krankenhauses Königin Elisabeth Herzberge en: New Chapel of the Evangelical Hospital Queen Elisabeth of Herzberge	Herzberge	–	Hospital pertaining	E: 1986	UP†	EKBO	Licht.-bg
Neue Kirche en: New Church	Friedrichstadt	Deutscher Dom (i.e. German Cathedral), Deutsche Kirche (i.e. German Church)	no namesake Gendarmenmarkt, listed building	E: 1701–1708; D: 1781; R: 1781–1785; N: 1881–1882; D: 1943/1945; R: 1977–1988	prof. last: UP†	last: APU	Mitte
Neue Nazarethkirche en: New Nazareth Church	Wedding	–	Nazareth Leopoldplatz / Turiner Straße, Lutheran till 1989	E: 1889–1893	Sim. of Chr.† a. Orth.†	Fr. ch.	Mitte
Neue Synagoge en: New Synagogue	Spandauer Vorstadt	–	no namesake Oranienburger Straße; forcedly closed in Apr. 1940	E: 1859–1866; Dam. 1938; R: 1939; D: Nov. 1943; D: 1959 (ruin); A: 1988–1995	Jew. Ref.	JGB	Mitte
Neu-Westend-Kirche en: Neu-Westend Church	Westend	–	Neu-Westend a neighbourhood in Westend Eichenallee	E: 1958–1960	Luth.†	EKBO	C-W
Nikodemuskirche en: Nicodemus Church	Neukölln	–	Nicodemus Nansenstraße, listed building	E: 1912–1913; D: 26 Febr. 1945; R: 1954–1956	Luth.†	EKBO	Neuk.
Oberpfarr- und Domkirche en: Supreme Parish and Collegiate Church	Museum Island	Berliner Dom (i.e. Berlin Cathedral / Collegiate Church) since 1608; Stiftskirche Unserer Lieben Frauen, des heiligen Kreuzes, St. Petri und Pauli, St. Erasmi und St. Nicolai (i.e. Collegiate Church of Our Lady, the Holy Cross, Ss. Peter and Paul, Erasmus and Nicholas) between 1465 and 1536	Trinity betw. 1608–1817; Mary(am) of Nazareth, Christian Cross, Simon Petrus, Paul (Sha'ul) of Tarsus, Erasmus of Formiae, and Nicholas of Myra before 1608 Am Lustgarten	E: 1451; A: 1397 (moved into older St. Pauli); N: 1747–1750; R: 1842–1848; A: 1849–1858; D: 1893; N: 1894–1905; D: 1943; R: 1967–1993	UP†	UEK	Mitte
Offenbarungskirche en: Revelation Church	Friedrichshain	–	Revelation Simplonstraße, listed building	E: 1948–1949	Luth.†	EKBO	F-K
Ölbergkirche en: Mount Olive Church	Luisenstadt	–	Olive, Mt. Paul-Lincke-Ufer	E: 1922	Luth.†	EKBO	F-K
Osterkirche en: Easter Church	Wedding	–	Easter Sprengelstraße / Samoastraße	E: 1910–1911; D: 22 Nov. 1943; R: 1953	Luth.†	EKBO	Mitte
Parochialkirche en: Parochial Church	Klosterviertel	–	parochial Reformed church as opposed to the Palace Reformed Church Klosterstraße / Parochialstraße, listed building	E: 1695–1703; D: 24 May 1944; R: 1950–1951	Ref.†	EKBO	Mitte
Passionskirche en: Passion Church	Tempelhofer; Vorstadt	–	Passion Marheinekeplatz / Schleiermacherstraße, listed building	E: 1904–1907	UP†	EKBO	F-K
Patmoskirche en: Patmos Church	Steglitz	–	Patmos Treitschkestraße, listed building	E: 1961–1964	Luth.†	EKBO	S-Z
Paul-Gerhardt-Gemeindeheim en: Paul Gerhardt Community Home	Bohnsdorf	–	Gerhardt, Paul Reihersteg, listed building	E: 1936–1937	Luth.†	EKBO	T-K
Paul-Gerhardt-Gemeindezentrum; Church en: Paul Gerhardt Congregation Centre	Falkenhagener Feld	–	Gerhardt, Paul Im Spektefeld	E: 1972–1973	Luth.†	EKBO	Spand.
Paul-Gerhardt-Kirche en: Paul Gerhardt Church	Prenzlauer Berg	–	Gerhardt, Paul Wisbyer Straße, listed building	E: 1907–1910	Luth.†	EKBO	Pankow
Paul-Gerhardt-Kirche en: Paul Gerhardt Church	Schöneberg	–	Gerhardt, Paul Hauptstraße, listed building	E: 1908–1910; D: 1945; N: 1958–1962	Luth.†	EKBO	T-S
Pauluskirche en: Paul Church	Lichterfelde	–	Paul (Sha'ul) of Tarsus Hindenburgdamm, listed building	E: 1898–1900; D: 24 Mar. 1944; R: 1952–1957	Luth.†	EKBO	S-Z
Pauluskirche en: Paul Church	Neukölln	–	Paul (Sha'ul) of Tarsus Kranoldplatz	E: 1965	Luth.†	SELK	Neuk.
Pauluskirche en: Paul Church	Zehlendorf	–	Paul (Sha'ul) of Tarsus Kirchstraße / Martin-Buber-Straße, listed building	E: 1903–1905	Luth.†	EKBO	S-Z
Pergamonaltar en: Pergamon Altar	Museum Island	–	Pergamon Pergamon Museum	E: 1st half of 2nd c. before the era A: 1897–1901; A: 1930; A: 1939–1941; R: 1959	prof. last: RaC	?	Mitte
Petruskirche en: Peter Church	Lichterfelde	–	Simon Petrus Oberhofer Platz, listed building	E: 1897–1898; D: 1941; R: 1951–1955	Luth.†	EKBO	S-Z
Petruskirche en: Peter Church	Stresow	–	Simon Petrus Grunewaldstraße	E: 1963–1964	Luth.†	EKBO	Spand.
Pfingstkirche en: Pentecost Church	Friedrichshain	–	Pentecost Petersburger Platz, listed building	E: 1906–1908	Luth.†	EKBO	F-K
Philipp-Melanchthon-Kirche en: Philipp Melanchthon Church	Neukölln	–	Melanchthon, Philipp Kranoldstraße / Hertastraße, listed building	E: 1914–1916	Luth.†	EKBO	Neuk.
Philippus-Kapelle en: Philip the Apostle Chapel	Alt-Hohen- schönhausen	Philippuskapelle	Philip the Apostle Treffurter Straße	E: 1952–1954	Luth.†	EKBO	Licht.-bg
Philippuskirche en: Philip Church	Friedenau	–	Melanchthon, Philipp Stierstraße	E: 1959–1962	Luth.†	EKBO	T-S
Philippuskirche en: Philip Church	Tegel	Kirche Tegel-Süd (i.e. Tegel-Süd Church) before 1967	Melanchthon, Philipp Ascheberger Weg	E: 1956–1957	Luth.†	EKBO	Rein.-df
Radelandkirche en: Radeland Church	Hakenfelde	–	Radeland (i.e. cleared forest land) Schwanter Weg 3 / Radelandstraße 78	E: 1970; A: 1992	Luth.†	EKBO	Spand.
Reformationskirche en: Reformation Church	Moabit	–	Reformation Beusselstraße / Wiclefstraße, listed building	E: 1905–1907	Luth.†	EKBO	Mitte
Regina-Mundi-Kapelle en: Queen of the World Chapel	Waidmannslust	–	Queen of Heaven Oraniendamm, profaned in 2004	E: 1949; N: 1971	prof. last: RC†	last: AB	Rein.-df
Rosenkranz-Basilika en: Rosary Basilica	Steglitz	–	Rosary Kieler Straße, listed building	E: 1899–1900	RC†	AB	S-Z
Russische Kirche en: Russian Church	Wilmersdorf	–	? Hohenzollerndamm / Ruhrstraße	E: 1928; A: 1929	prof. last: Orth.†	last: ROCOR	C-W
Saint George's Church	Westend	Englische Kirche zu St. Georg (i.e. English Church of St. George)	George of Lydda Preußenallee / Badenallee; 1st church was in Oranienburger Straße / Monbijoustraße (Mitte)	E: 1885; D: 1943/1944; N: 1950	Angl.†	DiE	C-W
Salemkirche en: Salem Church	Neukölln	–	Salem Delbrückstraße	E: 1931	Meth.†	UMC	Neuk.
Salvator-Kirche en: Salvator Church	Lichtenrade	–	Salvator Mundi Bahnhofstraße	E: 1932–1933	RC†	AB	T-S
Salvator-Kirche en: Salvator Church	Schmargendorf	–	Salvator Mundi Tölzer Straße	E: 1932–1933	RC†	AB	C-W
Samariterkirche en: Good Samaritan Church	Friedrichshain	–	Good Samaritan Samariterplatz, listed building	E: 1892–1894	Luth.†	EKBO	F-K
Sankt-Adalbert-Kirche en: St. Adalbert Church	Spandauer Vorstadt	–	Adalbert of Prague Torstraße / Linienstraße, listed building	E: 1932–1933	RC†	AB	Mitte
Sankt-Afra-Kirche en: St. Afra Church	Gesundbrunnen	–	Afra (martyr) Graunstraße, listed building	E: 1898	RC†	AB	Mitte
Sankt-Agnes-Kapelle en: St. Agnes Chapel	Konradshöhe	–	Agnes (saint) Eichelhäherstraße	E: 1929	RC†	AB	Rein.-df
Sankt-Agnes-Kirche en: St. Agnes Church	Luisenstadt	City-Kirche Berlin International (i.e. Berlin International City Church) between 2005 and 2011; before a Catholic parish; the archdiocese leased the building for 99 years to an art gallery, to be opened in 2013	Agnes (saint) Alexandrinenstraße	A: 1925; D: 3 Febr. 1945; N: 1965–1966	prof. last: Free Chr.†	AB	F-K
Sankt-Albertus-Magnus-Kirche en: St. Albertus Magnus Church	Halensee	–	Albertus Magnus Nestorstraße	E: 1959–1962	RC†	AB	C-W
Sankt-Alfons-Kirche en: St. Alphonsus Church	Marienfelde	–	Alphonsus Maria de Liguori Emilienstraße / Beyrodtstraße	E: 1931–1932; D: 1941/1944; R: 1956	RC†	AB	T-S
Sankt-Aloysius-Kirche en: St. Aloysius Church	Wedding	–	Aloysius Gonzaga Schwyzer Straße / Barfußstraße, listed building	E: 1956	RC†	AB	Mitte
Sankt Andreaskirche en: St. Andrew Church	Friedrichshain	Andreaskirche (i.e. Andrew Church)	Andrew the Apostle Stralauer Platz / Andreasstraße, im Zweiten Weltkrieg ausgebrannt, Ruine 1949 gesprengt	E: 1853–1856; D: 8 May 1944; D: 1949 (ruin)	removed last: Luth.†	last: APU	F-K
Sankt-Anna-Kirche en: St. Anna Church	Baumschulenweg	–	Anne, Mother of Mary Frauenlobstraße	E: 1929–1930	RC†	AB	T-K
Sankt Annenkirche en: St. Anne's Church	Dahlem	Dorfkirche Dahlem (i.e. Dahlem Village Church)	Anne, Mother of Mary Königin-Luise-Straße / Pacelliallee, listed building	after 1440	Luth.†	EKBO	S-Z
Sankt-Annen-Kirche en: St. Anne's Church	Lichterfelde	–	Anne, Mother of Mary Gardeschützenweg, listed building	E: 1935–1937	RC†	AB	S-Z
Sankt-Ansgar-Kirche en: St. Ansgar Church	Hansaviertel	–	Ansgar Klopstockstraße / Altonaer Straße, listed building	E: 1926; D: 194? N: 1956–1957	RC†	AB	Mitte
Sankt-Antonius-Kirche en: St. Anthony Church	Friedrichshain	Sankt-Antonius-Kapelle (i.e. St. Anthony Chapel)	Anthony the Great Rüdersdorfer Straße, listed building	E: 1897–1898; A: 1909–1914; D: 1945; R: 1950s	RC†	AB	F-K
Sankt-Antonius- und Schenute-Kirche en: Ss. Anthony and Shenoute Church	Lichtenberg	formerly Glaubenskirche (i.e. Church of Faith)	Anthony the Great; Shenoute Roedeliusplatz, listed building	E: 1903–1905	Orth.†	COCA	Licht.-bg
Sankt-Antonius-von-Padua-Kirche en: St. Anthony of Padova Church	Ober- schöneweide	–	Anthony of Padua Roedernstraße / Griechische Allee / Antoniuskirchstraße, listed building	E: 1906–1907	RC†	AB	T-K
Sankt-Augustinus-Kirche en: St. Augustine Church	Prenzlauer Berg	Augustinuskirche (i.e. Augustine Church)	Augustine of Hippo Dänenstraße, listed building	E: 1927–1928	RC†	AB	Pankow
Sankt Bartholomäuskirche en: St. Bartholomew Church	Friedrichshain	Bartholomäuskirche (i.e.Bartholomew Church)	Bartholomew the Apostle Friedenstraße / Otto-Braun-Straße, listed building	E: 1854–1858; D: 1945; R: 1952–1957	Luth.†	EKBO	F-K
Sankt-Benedikt-Kirche en: St. Benedict Church	Lankwitz	–	Benedict of Nursia Kaulbachstraße / Corneliusstraße	E: 1967–1968	RC†	AB	S-Z
Sankt-Bernhard-Kirche en: St. Bernard Church	Dahlem	–	Bernard of Clairvaux Königin-Luise-Straße, listed building	E: 1933–1934	RC†	AB	S-Z
Sankt-Bernhard-Kirche en: St. Bernard Church	Tegel	–	Bernard of Clairvaux Bernauer Straße / Sterkrader Straße, listed building	E: 1959–1960	RC†	AB	Rein.-df
Sankt-Bonifatius-Kirche en: St. Boniface Church	Tempelhofer; Vorstadt	–	Boniface Yorckstraße, listed building	E: 1906–1907	RC†	AB	F-K
Sankt-Canisiuskirche en: St. Canisius Church	Witzleben	St. Canissen as of 1957, St.-Canisius-Kapelle (i.e. St. Canisius Chapel) as of 1924	Canisius, Petrus Witzlebenstraße / Neue Kantstraße	E: 1924; D: 16 Dec. 1943; N: 1954–1957; D: 30 Apr. 1995; N: 2000–2002	RC†	AB	C-W
Sankt-Christophorus-Kirche en: St. Christopher Church	Neukölln	–	Christophorus Nansenstraße, listed building	E: 1929–1932	RC†	AB	Neuk.
Sankt-Clara-Kirche en: St. Clare Church	Rixdorf	–	Clare of Assisi Bornsdorfer Straße / Briesestraße, listed building	E: 1896–1897	RC†	AB	Neuk.
Sankt-Clemens-Kirche en: St. Clemens Church	Friedrichstadt	–	Clemens Maria Hofbauer Stresemannstraße	E: 1911	RC†	AB	F-K
Sankt-Clemens-von-Ohrid-Kirche en: St. Clement of Ohrid Church	Tempelhofer; Vorstadt	–	Clement of Ohrid Blücherstraße	E: ?	Orth.†	MOED	F-K
Sankt-Dominicus-Kirche en: St. Dominic Church	Gropiusstadt	–	Dominic de Guzmán Lipschitzallee / Hugo-Heimann-Straße	E: 1976–1977	RC†	AB	Neuk.
Sankt-Eduard-Kirche en: St. Edward Church	Neukölln	–	Edward the Confessor Kranoldstraße, listed building	E: 1906–1907	RC†	AB	Neuk.
Sankt Elisabethkirche en: St. Elizabeth Church	Hakenfelde	–	Elizabeth Fichtenweg	E: 1928	Luth.†	EKBO	Spand.
Sankt-Elisabeth-Kirche en: St. Elizabeth Church	Rote Insel	–	Elizabeth of Hungary Kolonnenstraße, listed building	E: 1910–1911	RC†	AB	T-S
Sankt Elisabethkirche en: St. Elizabeth Church	Spandauer Vorstadt	Elisabethkirche (i.e. Elizabeth Church)	Elizabeth Invalidenstraße, listed building, gradually under reconstruction	E: 1830–1835; D: 1945	ruin last: Luth.†?	last: APU	Mitte
Sankt-Fidelis-Kirche en: St. Fidelis Church	Mariendorf	–	Fidelis of Sigmaringen Röblingstraße	E: 1926–1927; D: 1943; N: 1948–1953	RC†	AB	T-S
Sankt-Franziskus-Kirche en: St. Francis Church	Friedrichshagen	–	Francis of Assisi Scharnweberstraße	E: 1906; N: 1950–1952	RC†	AB	T-K
Sankt-Franziskus-Kirche en: St. Francis Church	Staaken	St.-Johannes-Baptist-Maria-Vianney-Kapelle (i.e. St. John Baptist Mary Vianney Chapel)	Francis of Assisi Hackbuschstraße	E: 1955	RC†	AB	Spand.
Sankt-Franziskus-Kirche en: St. Francis Church	Staaken	–	Francis of Assisi Finkenkruger Weg, church stood in the cleared East German border zone (like Versöhnungskirche in Rosenthaler Vorstadt), the church was demolished by the end of 1987 following a command by the GDR government	E: 1924–1925; D: 1987	removed last: RC†	last: DB	Spand.
Sankt-Georgs-Kirche en: St. George's Church	Pankow	Georgskirche (i.e. George's Church)	George of Lydda Kissingenplatz / Kissingenstraße, listed building	E: 1907–1909	RC†	AB	Pankow
Sankt Gertraud(t)kirche en: St. Gertrude Church	Neukölln am Wasser	Gertraudenkirche (i.e. Gertrude's Church)	Gertrude of Nivelles Spittelmarkt	E: 1405–1411; D: 1881	removed last: Luth.†	last: APU	Mitte
Sankt-Hedwigs-Kathedrale en: St. Hedwig's Cathedral	Dorotheenstadt	Katholische Kirche (i.e. Catholic Church), Hedwigskirche (i.e. Hedwig's Church) until 1930	Hedwig of Andechs Bebelplatz / Behrenstraße / Hinter der Katholischen Kirche, listed building	E: 1747–1773; A: 1886–1887; D: 2 Mar. 1943; R: 1952–1963	RC†	AB	Mitte
Sankt-Hildegard-Kirche en: St. Hildegard Church	Frohnau	Johanneskirche (i.e. John Church) which moved into a new building in 1936	Hildegard of Bingen Senheimer Straße, listed building, originally a sports hall est. 1913–1914	E: 1913–1914; A: 1921; A: 1936–1938	RC†	AB	Rein.-df
Sankt Jacobikirche en: St. James’ Church	Luisenstadt	–	James, son of Zebedee Oranienstraße, listed building	E: 1844–1845; D: 3 Febr. 1945; R: 1954–1957	Luth.†	EKBO	F-K
Sankt-Jakob-von-Sarug-Kirche en: St. Jacob of Serugh Church	Tiergarten	Sankt-Ludgerus-Kirche (i.e. St. Ludger Church) before 1984, Sankt-Matthias-Kapelle (i.e. St. Matthias Chapel) before 1928	Jacob of Serugh Potsdamer Straße, formerly Roman Catholic, Syrian Orthodox since 1984	E: 1868; D: 1945; N/R: 1959	Orth.†	Syr.	Mitte
Sankt-Johannes-Basilika en: St. John Basilica	Neukölln	Neue katholische Garnisonskirche (i.e. New Catholic Garrison Church)	John the Baptist Lilienthalstraße, listed building	E: 1895–1897	RC†	AB	Neuk.
Sankt-Johannes-Capistran-Kirche en: St. John of Capistrano Church	Tempelhof	–	John of Capistrano Götzstraße / Felixstraße	E: 1968; D: 2004	removed last: RC†	AB	T-S
Sankt-Johannes-Evangelist-Kirche en: St. John the Evangelist Church	Französisch Buchholz	–	John the Evangelist Eddastraße / Elfenallee, listed building	E: 1936–1937	RC†	AB	Pankow
Sankt-Johannes-Evangelist-Kirche en: St. John the Evangelist Church	Johannisthal	–	John the Evangelist Waldstraße	E: 1927	RC† a. GC†	AB	T-K
Sankt-Johannes-Evangelist-Kirche en: St. John the Evangelist Church	Spandauer Vorstadt	–	John the Evangelist Auguststraße, listed building	E: 1895–1900	Luth.†	EKBO	Mitte
Sankt-Johannes-Evangelist-Kirche en: St. John the Evangelist Church	Steglitz	–	John the Evangelist Sembritzkistraße, listed building	E: 1929; N: 1951	RC†	AB	S-Z
Sankt Johanniskirche en: John's Church	Moabit	Johanniskirche (i.e. John's Church)	John the Baptist Alt-Moabit, Karl Friedrich Schinkel, listed building	E: 1832–1835; A: 1896; D: 23 Nov. 1943; R: 1951–1957	Luth.†	EKBO	Mitte
Sankt Johanniskirche en: St. John's Church	Spandau Old City	–	John the Evangelist? Carl-Schurz-Straße 57/59 / Jüdenstraße 54 (Spandau)	E: 1750–1751; D: 1903	removed last: Ref.†	last: APU	Spand.
Sankt-Josef-Kirche en: St. Joseph Church	Dammvorstadt	–	Joseph of Nazareth Lindenstraße (Dammvorstadt)	E: 1898–1899	RC†	AB	T-K
Sankt-Josef-Kirche en: St. Joseph Church	Weißensee	–	Joseph of Nazareth Behaimstraße, listed building	E: 1898–1899	RC†	AB	Pankow
Sankt-Joseph-Kapelle en: St. Joseph Chapel	Hermsdorf	–	Joseph of Nazareth Kurhausstraße, listed building	E: 1898–1899	RC†	AB	Rein.-df
Sankt-Joseph-Kirche en: St. Joseph Church	Rudow	Sankt-Joseph-Kapelle (St. Joseph Chapel) as of 1884	Joseph of Nazareth Alt-Rudow / Neuköllner Straße	E: 1884; N: 1967	RC†	AB	Neuk.
Sankt-Joseph-Kirche en: St. Joseph Church	Siemensstadt	–	Joseph of Nazareth Quellweg / Goebelstraße / Natalissteig, listed building	E: 1934–1935	RC†	AB	Spand.
Sankt-Joseph-Kirche en: St. Joseph Church	Tegel	–	Joseph of Nazareth Bonifaziusstraße / Liebfrauenweg, listed building	E: 1932–1933	RC†	AB	Rein.-df
St. Joseph en: St. Joseph's Church	Wedding	–	Joseph of Nazareth Müllerstraße, listed building	E: 1907–1909	RC†	AB	Mitte
Sankt-Judas-Thaddäus-Kirche en: St. Jude Thaddeus Church	Neu-Tempelhof	–	Jude the Apostle Loewenhardtdamm / Bäumerplan, listed building	E: 1958–1959	RC†	AB	T-S
Sankt-Kamillus-Kirche en: St. Camillus Church	Charlottenburg	–	Camillus de Lellis Klausenerplatz	E: 1930–1932	RC†	AB	C-W
Sankt-Karl-Borromäus-Kirche en: St. Charles Borromeo Church	Grunewald	–	Borromeo, Charles Delbrückstraße,	E: 1929; D: 15 Febr. 1944; N: 1955	RC†	AB	C-W
Sankt-Konrad-Kirche en: St. Conrad Church	Schöneberg	–	Conrad of Parzham Rubensstraße, listed building	E: 1956–1957	RC†	AB	T-S
Sankt-Konrad-von-Parzham-Kirche en: St. Conrad of Parzham Church	Falkenberg	–	Conrad of Parzham Ahrensfelder Chaussee, listed building	E: 1939–1940	RC†	AB	Licht.-bg
Sankt-Konstantin-und-Helena-Kirche en: Ss. Constantine and Helena Church	Tegel	–	Constantine the Great; Helena of Byzance Wittestraße, on the Tegel Russian Orthodox Cemetery, originally only cemetery chapel	E: 1893–1894	Orth.†	ROCOR	Rein.-df
Gemeindezentrum Sankt-Lambertus en: Community Centre of St. Lambert	Hakenfelde	–	Lambert of Maastricht Cautiusstraße	E: 1975	RC†	AB	Spand.
St.-Louis-Kirche en: St. Louis Church	Wedding	–	Louis IX of France Kurt-Schumacher-Damm, listed building, French Allied garrison church	E: 1952–1953; A: 1955	RC†	AB	Mitte
Sankt-Ludwig-Kirche en: St. Louis Church	Wilmersdorf	–	Louis IX of France Ludwigkirchplatz / Pariser Straße / Pfalzburger Straße,	E: 1896–1899	RC†	AB	C-W
Sankt Lukaskirche en: St. Luke Church	Friedrichs- vorstadt	–	Luke the Evangelist Bernburger Straße, listed building, Berlin's first parish church built inseriated between residential houses	E: 1859–1861; D: 29 Apr. 1945; R: 1954	UP†	EKBO	F-K
Sankt-Maria-Magdalena-Kirche en: St. Mary Magdalene Church	Nieder- schönhausen	–	Mary Magdalene Platanenstraße, listed building	E: 1929–1930	RC†	AB	Pankow
Sankt-Marien-Kapelle en: St. Mary's Chapel	Reinickendorf	–	Mary(am) of Nazareth Letteallee, listed building	E: 1903–1904	RC†	AB	Rein.-df
Sankt Marienkirche en: St. Mary's Church	Marienviertel	–	Mary(am) of Nazareth Karl-Liebknecht-Straße, listed building, first preaching venue of chairing pastor (bishop) of EKBO	E: by 1270–1300	Luth.†	EKBO	Mitte
St. Marien am Behnitz en: St. Mary's Church at Behnitz	Spandau Old City	–	Mary(am) of Nazareth Behnitz, listed building	E: 1845–1848	RC†	AB	Spand.
Sankt-Marien-Kirche en: St. Mary's Church	Heiligensee	Maternitas Beatae Maria Virginis (i.e. Maternity of the Blessed Virgin Mary)	Mary(am) of Nazareth Schulzendorfer Straße	E: 1936	RC†	AB	Rein.-df
Sankt-Marien-Kirche en: St. Mary's Church	Reinickendorf	–	Mary(am) of Nazareth Klemkestraße, listed building	E: 1913–1919; D: 1944; R: 1956	RC†	AB	Rein.-df
Sankt Marienkirche en: St. Mary's Church	Spandau Old City	–	Mary(am) of Nazareth Abbey of the Benedictine Nunnery	E: 1240s D: 17th c.	removed last: Luth.†	last: ?	Spand.
Sankt Marienkirche en: St. Mary's Church	Zehlendorf	–	Mary(am) of Nazareth Riemeisterstraße	E: 1959; N: 1973	Luth.†	SELK	S-Z
Sankt-Markus-Kirche en: St. Mark Church	Falkenhagener Feld	–	Mark the Evangelist Am Kiesteich	E: 1976–1977	RC†	AB	Spand.
Sankt Markuskirche en: St. Mark Church	Friedrichshain	–	Mark the Evangelist Weberstraße / Strausberger Platz	E: 1848–1855; D: May 1944; D: 1957 (ruin)	removed last: Luth.†	last: APU	F-K
Sankt-Martins-Kirche en: St. Martin's Church	Kaulsdorf	–	Martin of Tours Giesestraße / Nentwigstraße, listed building	E: 1929–1930	RC†	AB	M-H
Sankt-Martins-Kirche en: St. Martin's Church	Märkisches Viertel	–	Martin of Tours Wilhelmsruher Damm	E: 1972–1973	RC†	AB	Rein.-df
Sankt Matthäuskirche en: St. Matthew Church	Kulturforum	Sankt Matthäikirche (i.e. St. Matthew's Church)	Matthew the Evangelist Matthäikirchplatz, listed building	E: 1844–1846; D: 1945; R: 1956–1960	UP†	EKBO	Mitte
Sankt-Matthias-Kirche en: St. Matthias Church	Schöneberg	–	Matthias the Apostle Winterfeldtplatz, listed building	E: 1893–1896; D: 1944, 1945; R: till 1952	RC†	AB	T-S
Sankt-Mauritius-Kirche en: St. Maurice Church	Lichtenberg	–	Maurice d'Agaune Mauritiuskirchstraße / John-Sieg-Straße, listed building	E: 1891–1892	RC†	AB	Licht.-bg
Sankt-Maximilian-Kolbe-Kirche en: St. Maximilian Kolbe Church	Staaken	–	Kolbe, Maximilian Maulbeerallee	E: 1975–1976	RC†	AB	Spand.
Sankt-Michaelskirche en: St. Michael's Church	Luisenstadt	–	Michael (archangel) Michaelkirchplatz	E: 1850–1861; D: 1944, 3 Febr. 1945; A: till 1957	RC†	AB	Mitte
Neue Sankt-Michaelskirche en: New St. Michael's Church	Luisenstadt	–	Michael (archangel) Alfred-Döblin-Platz / Waldemarstraße, erected for the West Berlin parishioners of the cross-border congregation with its 'Sankt-Michaelskirche' in East Berlin	E: 1965	RC†	AB	F-K
Sankt-Michael-Kirche en: St. Michael Church	Wannsee	–	Michael (archangel) Königstraße, listed building	E: 1926–1927	RC†	AB	S-Z
Sankt Moritzkirche en: St. Maurice Church	Spandau Old City	St. Mauritienkirch' (i.e. St. Morris Church)	Maurice d'Agaune Jüdenstraße (Spandau) / Moritzstraße, profaned by 1545, refurbished as Reformed church in 1657, later also garrison church, in 1785 reprofaned	E: by 13/14th c. R: 1656–1657; D: 1920	removed last: Ref.†	?	Spand.
Sankt Nikolaikirche en: St. Nicholas' Church	Nikolaiviertel	–	Nicholas of Myra Nikolaikirchplatz / Poststraße, profaned as museum in 1938	E: by 1230; A: 1379–1400; D: 1944/1945; R: 1981–1987	prof. last: Luth.†	last: APU	Mitte
Sankt Nikolaikirche en: St. Nicholas Church	Spandau Old City	–	Nicholas of Myra Reformationsplatz, listed building	E: by 1210; N: before 1369; D: 1944 tower R: 1946–1949	Luth.†	EKBO	Spand.
Sankt-Nikolaus-Kirche en: St. Nicholas Church	Wittenau	–	Nicholas of Tolentino Techowpromenade / Spießweg / Alt-Wittenau, listed building	E: 1959–1961	RC†	AB	Rein.-df
Sankt-Norbert-Kirche en: St. Norbert Church	Schöneberg	–	Norbert of Xanten Dominicusstraße	E: 1913–1918; D: 1943; N: 1958–1962	RC†	AB	T-S
Sankt-Otto-Kirche en: St. Otto Church	Zehlendorf	–	Otto of Bamberg Heimat	E: 1954–1955	RC†	AB	S-Z
Sankt Paulikirche en: St. Paul's Church	Cölln	Stiftskirche Unserer Lieben Frauen, des heiligen Kreuzes, St. Petri und Pauli, St. Erasmi und St. Nicolai (i.e. Collegiate Church of Our Lady, the Holy Cross, Ss. Peter and Paul, Erasmus and Nicholas) between 1536 and 1608; Berliner Dom (i.e. Berlin Collegiate / Cathedral Church) since 1608	Paul (Sha'ul) of Tarsus Brüderstraße / An der Stechbahn	E: 1345; D: 1747	removed last: Ref.†	?	Mitte
Sankt Paulskirche en: St. Paul's Church	Gesundbrunnen	–	Paul (Sha'ul) of Tarsus Badstraße / Pankstraße	E: 1832–1835; D: 1943/1945; R: 1952–1957	Luth.†	EKBO	Mitte
Sankt-Paulus-Kirche en: St. Paul Church	Moabit	Sankt-Pauli-Kirche (i.e. St. Paul's Church)	Paul (Sha'ul) of Tarsus Oldenburger Straße / Waldenserstraße, listed building	E: 1892–1893	RC†	AB	Mitte
Sankt Peter-und-Paul-Kirche en: Ss. Peter and Paul Church	Wannsee	–	Simon Petrus, Paul (Sha'ul) of Tarsus Nikolskoe, listed building	E: 1834–1837	Luth.†	EKBO	S-Z
Sankt Petrikirche en: St. Peter's Church	Cölln	–	Simon Petrus Petrikirchplatz / Scharrenstraße / Gertraudenstraße	E: 1st half of 13th c. A: 1359; A: 1717; D: 1730; N: 1732–1733; D: 1734; R: 1734–1737; D: 1809; N: 1846–1853; D: Apr. 1945; D: 1965 (ruin)	removed last: Luth.†	last: APU	Mitte
Sankt-Petrus-Kirche en: St. Peter Church	Gesundbrunnen	–	Simon Petrus Bellermannstraße	E: 1906–1908	RC†	AB	Mitte
Sankt-Petrus-Kirche en: St. Peter Church	Wilmersdorf	–	Simon Petrus Dillenburger Straße / Schlangenbader Straße	E: 2002–2005	RC†	SSPX	C-W
Sankt Philippus-Apostel-Kirche en: St. Philip the Apostle Church	Friedrich- Wilhelm-Stadt	–	Philip the Apostle Philippstraße	E: 1852; D: 1945; D: 1964 (ruin)	removed last: Luth.†	last: APU	Mitte
Sankt-Pius-Kirche en: St. Pius Church	Friedrichshain	–	Pius IX Palisadenstraße, listed building	E: 1893–1894; D: 1945; R: 1950s	RC†	AB	F-K
Sankt-Raphael-Kirche en: St. Raphael Church	Gatow	–	Raphael (archangel) Alt-Gatow	E: 1965; D: 2005	removed last: RC†	last: AB	Spand.
Sankt-Richard-Kirche en: St. Richard Church	Rixdorf	–	Richard of Chichester Braunschweiger Straße / Schudomastraße	E: 1930; N: 1975	RC†	AB	Neuk.
Sankt-Rita-Kirche en: St. Rita Church	Reinickendorf	–	Rita of Cascia General-Woyna-Straße	E: 1952	RC†	AB	Rein.-df.
Sankt-Sebastian-Kirche en: St. Sebastian Church	Gesundbrunnen	Sebastianskirche (i.e. Sebastian's Church)	Sebastian (saint) Gartenplatz, listed building	E: 1890–1893	RC†	AB	Mitte
Sankt Simeonkirche en: St. Simeon Church	Luisenstadt	–	Simeon the Elder Wassertorstraße, listed building	E: 1894–1896; D: 3 Febr. 1945; R: 1955–1961	Luth.†	EKBO	F-K
Sankt-Stephanus-Kirche en: St. Stephen Church	Haselhorst	–	Stephen the Protomartyr Gorgasring / Riensbergstraße	E: 1951; N: 1982	RC†	AB	Spand.
Sankt-Theresia-vom-Kinde-Jesu-Kirche en: St. Thérèse of the Child Jesus Church	Buckow	–	Thérèse of Lisieux Warmensteinacher Straße / Töpchiner Weg	E: 1967	RC†	AB	Neuk.
Sankt Thomaskirche en: St. Thomas Church	Luisenstadt	Thomaskirche (i.e. Thomas Church)	Thomas the Apostle Mariannenplatz, listed building	E: 1864–1869; D: 1943; R: 1956–1963	Luth.†	EKBO	F-K
Sankt Thomas-von-Aquin-Kirche en: St. Thomas Aquinas Church	Charlottenburg	–	Thomas Aquinas Schillerstraße	E: 1931–1932	RC†	AB	C-W
Sankt-Wilhelm-Kirche en: St. William Church	Wilhelmstadt	–	William of Gellone Weißenburger Straße	E: 1935; N: 1963–1965	RC†	AB	Spand.
Schiffer- und Hafenkirche en: Inland Navigators and Harbour Church	Moabit	–	inland navigators and harbour Westhafenstraße	E: 1904; D: 1943; N: 1968	Luth.†	EKBO	Mitte
Schilfdachkapelle Zum Guten Hirten en: Thatched Chapel of the Good Shepherd	Kladow	Schilfdachkapelle	Good Shepherd Gottfried-Arnold-Weg, listed building, erected for the West Berlin parishioners of the cross-border congregation of Groß Glienicke whose church was in East Germany	E: 1951–1953	Luth.†	EKBO	Spand.
Schlosskapelle Charlottenburg en: Charlottenburg Palace Chapel	Charlottenburg	–	Charlottenburg Palace inside the Palace, listed building	E: 1709–1712	prof. last: Ref.†	EKBO	C-W
Schlosskirche Buch en: Buch Palace Church	Buch	Dorfkirche Buch (i.e. Buch Village Church)	no namesake Alt-Buch, listed building	E: 13th c. D: 1731; N: 1731–1736; D: 1945; R: 1955–1956	Luth.†	EKBO	Pankow
Schlosskirche Köpenick en: Köpenick Palace Church	Köpenick	Schlosskapelle (i.e. Palace Chapel)	Köpenick Palace Schlossinsel, listed building	E: 1682–1684	Ref.†	EKBO	T-K
Schrippenkirche en: Bread Roll Church	Gesundbrunnen	–	bread roll Ackerstraße 136–137 (until 1979 #52)	E: 1861; A: 1902; D: 1980; N: 1979	Luth.†	EKBO	Mitte
Sefardische Synagoge Tiferet Israel en: Sephardic Synagogue	Schöneberg	–	Tiph'ereth Israel (i.e. Adornment [of the people] of Israel) Passauer Straße 4	A: 2006	Jew. Seph.	JGB	T-S
Segenskirche en: Church of the Blessing	Prenzlauer Berg	–	Blessing Schönhauser Allee, listed building	E: 1905–1908	UP†	EKBO	Pankow
Segenskirche en: Church of the Blessing	Reinickendorf	–	Blessing Auguste-Viktoria-Allee, listed building	E: 1891–1892; D: 15 Febr. 1944; R: 1953–1957	Luth.†	EKBO	Rein.-df
Şehitlik-Moschee en: Military Cemetery Mosque	Neukölln	Berlin Türk Şehitlik Camii (i.e. Berlin Turkish Military Cemetery Mosque)	Şehitlik-Friedhof (i.e. the Ottoman diplomats and military cemetery) Columbiadamm	E: before 1983; N: 1999–2005	Isl. Sun.	DİTİB	Neuk.
Silas-Kirchsaal en: Silas Church Hall	Schöneberg	–	Silas Großgörschenstraße	E: 1961	Luth.†	EKBO	T-S
Sophienkirche en: Sophie's Church	Spandauer Vorstadt	Spandauische Kirche (i.e. Spandau bound Church) till the 1740s	Sophia Louise of Mecklenburg-Schwerin Große Hamburger Straße, Sophienstraße	E: 1712–1713	Luth.†	EKBO	Mitte
Sri-Mayurapathy-Murugan-Tempel en: Shree Mayoorapathy Murugan Temple	Britz	–	Murugan Riesestraße 20–22, Blaschkoallee 48	E: 2008–2013	Hind.	BHM	Neukölln
Kirche Staaken-Gartenstadt en: Staaken Garden City Church	Staaken	–	Staaken Gartenstadt Kirchplatz, listed building	E: 1922	Luth.†	EKBO	Spand.
Stadtkirche Sankt Laurentius en: St. Lawrence City Church	Köpenick	–	Lawrence of Rome Alt-Köpenick / Kirchstraße, listed building	E: by 1239; D: 1837; N: 1838–1841	Luth.†	EKBO	T-K
Stephanuskirche en: Stephen Church	Gesundbrunnen	–	Stephen the Protomartyr Prinzenallee / Soldiner Straße	E: 1902–1904	Luth.†	EKBO	Mitte
Stephanuskirche en: Stephen Church	Zehlendorf	–	Stephen the Protomartyr Mühlenstraße	E: 1960–1961	Luth.†	EKBO	S-Z
Sühne-Christi-Kirche en: Atonement of Christ Church	Charlottenburg- Nord	–	Atonement Toeplerstraße / Halemweg	E: 1962–1964	Luth.†	EKBO	C-W
Synagoge Artilleriestraße en: Artilleriestraße Synagogue	Spandauer Vorstadt	–	no namesake Tucholskystraße (formerly Artilleriestr.), untouched by the pogrom, forcedly closed in 1939	E: 1904; D: 1943? D: 1967 (ruin)	removed last: Jew. Orth.	last: AJ	Mitte
Synagoge Beis Zion en: Beth Zion Synagogue	Rosenthaler; Vorstadt	Synagoge Bethzion (i.e. Beth Zion Synagogue)	Zion Brunnenstraße	A: 1910; D: 1938; R: 1984	prof. last: Jew. Orth.	last: JBZ	Mitte
Synagoge Charlottenburg en: Charlottenburg Synagogue	Charlottenburg	–	no namesake Behaimstraße 11; a Vereinssynagoge (i.e. synagogue of a private association) until 1937, then JGB	E: 1889–1890; Dam: 1938; D: 1944; D: 1957 (ruin)	removed last: Jew. Cons.	last: JGB	C-W
Synagoge Fasanenstraße en: Fasanenstrasse Synagogue	Charlottenburg	–	no namesake Fasanenstraße, only small remnants are inbuilt in the new Jewish community centre	E: 1912; D: 1938; D: 1943; A: 1958–1959	Jew.	JGB	C-W
Synagoge am Fraenkelufer en: Fraenkelufer Synagogue	Luisenstadt	Synagoge Kottbusser Ufer (i.e. Kottbusser Ufer Synagogue)	no namesake Fraenkelufer	E: 1913–1916; D: 1938; A: 1958–1959	Jew. Cons.	JGB	F-K
Synagoge Großer Jüdenhof en: Großer Jüdenhof Synagogue	Klosterviertel	–	no namesake Großer Jüdenhof, first synagogue of Berlin	E: 2nd half of 13th c. D: 1510	removed last: Jew.	last: JGB	Mitte
Synagoge Grunewald en: Grunewald Synagogue	Grunewald	–	Grunewald (forest) Franzensbader Straße 7/8; opened in a former dancing hall in 1923, a Vereinssynagoge (i.e. synagogue of the private association Synagogenverein Grunewald) until 1929, then JGB	E: 1891; A: 1923; D: 1938; D: 1941 (ruin)	removed last: Jew. Cons.	last: JGB?	C-W
Synagoge Heidereutergasse en: Heidereutergasse Synagogue	Marienviertel	Alte Synagoge (i.e. Old Synagogue)	no namesake Heidereutergasse 4, first synagogue after 1672, forcedly closed in Nov. 1942	E: 1712–1714; R: 18?? D: 1945; D: 1963 (ruin)	removed last. Jew. Orth.	last: JGB	Mitte
Synagoge Herbartstraße en: Herbartstraße Synagogue	Witzleben	–	no namesake Herbartstraße Home for the Elderly	A: 1981	Jew.	JGB	C-W
Synagoge Joachimsthaler Straße en: Joachimsthaler Straße Synagogue	Charlottenburg	Logenhaus Bne Briss (i.e. House of the Independent Order B'nai B'rith) till 1933	no namesake Joachimsthaler Straße	E: 19?? A: 1960?	Jew.	JGB	C-W
Synagoge Kaiserstraße en: Kaiserstraße Synagogue	Königsstadt	–	no namesake about Jacobystraße (course of Kaiserstr. removed)	E: 1868–1869; Dam: 1938; D: 1944; D: 1950s (ruin)	removed last: Jew. Orth.	last: JGB	Mitte
Synagoge Köpenick en: Köpenick Synagogue	Köpenick	–	no namesake Freiheit 8; Köpenick Jewish congregation merged into JGB in 1933	E: 1910; D: 1938	removed last: Jew.	last: JGB	T-K
Synagoge Lessingstraße en: Lessingstraße Synagogue	Hansaviertel	–	no namesake Lessingstraße 19 (renumbered as 6) / Flensburger Straße 14; a Vereinssynagoge (i.e. synagogue of the private association Synagogenverein Moabit und Hansabezirk)	E: 1909–1910; D: 1938; D: 1939 (ruin)	removed last: Jew. Cons.	last: JGB	Mitte
Synagoge Lindenstraße en: Lindenstraße Synagogue,	Luisenstadt	–	no namesake Axel-Springer-Straße (formerly Lindenstr.)	E: 1889–1891; Dam: 1938; D: 3 Febr. 1945; D: 1956 (ruin)	removed last: Jew. Cons.	last: JGB	F-K
Synagoge Lützowstraße en: Lützowstraße Synagogue	Tiergarten	–	no namesake Lützowstraße, forcedly closed after Pessach 1940	E: 1897–1898; Dam: 1938; A: 1939; D: 1944; D: 1954 (ruin)	removed last: Jew. Cons.	last: JGB	Mitte
Synagoge Münchener Straße en: Münchener Straße Synagogue	Bayerisches Viertel	–	no namesake Münchener Straße 36	E: 1909; D: 1943; D: 1956 (ruin)	removed last: Jew. Cons.	last: JGB	S-T
Synagoge Neu-Tempelhof en: Neu-Tempelhof Synagogue	Neu-Tempelhof	–	no namesake Mussehlstraße	A: 1931; D: 1938; R: 1938	prof. last: Jew. Cons.	last: IRN	T-S
Synagoge Norden en: Synagogue of the North	Prenzlauer Berg	Synagoge im Baruch Auerbachschen Waisenhaus (i.e. Synagogue within the Baruch Auerbachian Orphanage)	no namesake Schönhauser Allee 162; a Vereinssynagoge (i.e. synagogue of a private association), absorbed by the JGB until 1939, the orphanage was forcedly closed in 1942, the orphans deported	E: 1923; Dam: 1942; D: 194?	removed last: Jew.	last: JGB	Pankow
Synagoge Passauer Straße en: Passauer Straße Synagogue	Schöneberg	Synagoge des Westens (i.e. Synagogue of the West), a Vereinssynagoge (i.e. synagogue of the private association Religionsverein Westen) until 1937, then JGB	no namesake Passauer Straße 2	E: 1905–1906; D: 1938; D: 1951 (ruin)	removed last: Jew. Orth.	last: JGB	T-S
Synagoge Pestalozzistraße en: Pestalozzistraße Synagogue	Charlottenburg	Vereinssynagoge (i.e. synagogue of a private association), acquired by the Jewish Community of Berlin in 1919	no namesake Pestalozzistraße 14–15	E: 1911–1912; D: 1938; R: 1947	Jew.	JGB	C-W
Synagoge Prinzregentenstraße en: Prinzregentenstraße Synagogue	Wilmersdorf	–	no namesake Prinzregentenstraße 69–70	E: 1928–1931; D: 1938; D: 1958 (ruin)	removed last: Jew.	last: JGB	C-W
Gotteshaus der jüdischen Reformgemeinde en: House of God of the Jewish Reform Congregation	Spandauer Vorstadt	Tempel or Synagoge Johannisstraße (i.e. Johannisstraße Temple or Synagogue)	no namesake Johannisstraße 16, a Reform temple until 1938, mended to serve the congregants of the New Synagogue after its forced closure in Apr. 1940; forcedly closed in Apr. 1942	E: 1853–1854; R: 1913; Dam: 1938; R: Apr. 1940; D: Nov. 1944	removed last. Jew.	last: JGB	Mitte
Synagoge Rykestraße en: Rykestrasse Synagogue	Prenzlauer Berg	Friedenstempel (i.e. Peace Temple) after 1953	no namesake Rykestraße	E: 1903–1904; D: 1938; R: 1939; Closed 1942; R: 1947; R: 1952–1953	Jew.	JGB	Pankow
Synagoge Siegmunds Hof en: Siegmunds Hof Synagogue	Hansaviertel	–	no namesake Siegmunds Hof 11	E: 1886; A: 1924–1926 closed summer 1941; D: 1943	removed last: Jew. Orth.	last: AJ	Mitte
Synagoge Spandau en: Spandau Synagogue	Spandau Old City	Spandauer Vereinssynagoge (i.e. Spandau private synagogue)	no namesake Lindenufer / Kammerstraße	E: 1894–1895; D: 1938; D: 1942 (ruin)	removed last: Jew. Orth.	last: JGB	Spand.
Synagoge Steglitz en: Steglitz Synagogue	Steglitz	Wolfenstein-Synagoge	Wolfenstein, Moses, the donator Düppelstraße 41 / Hermann-Ehlers-Platz; a Vereinssynagoge (i.e. synagogue of the private association Religionsverein zur Wahrnehmung der Interessen der in Steglitz und Umgebung wohnenden Juden)	E: 1897; Dam: 10 Nov. 1938	prof. last: Jew. Cons.	last: JGB?	S-Z
Synagoge Tiergarten en: Tiergarten Synagogue	Moabit	Synagoge Levetzowstraße (i.e. Levetzowstraße Synagogue)	no namesake Levetzowstraße; the little damaged synagogue was abused as collection point for deportees	E: 1912–1914; Dam: 1938; D: 1943; D: 1956 (ruin)	removed last: Jew. Cons.	last: JGB	Mitte
Tabeakirche en: Tabitha Church	Neukölln	–	Dorcas (cf. Acts 9:40) Sonnenallee	E: 1957–1961	Luth.†	EKBO	Neuk.
Taborkirche en: Tabor Church	Alt-Hohen- schönhausen	Dorfkirche Hohen- schönhausen (i.e. Hohen- schönhausen Village Church)	Tabor, Mt. Hauptstraße (Hohen- schönhausen)	E: late 13th c.	Luth.†	EKBO	Licht.-bg
Taborkirche en: Tabor Church	Luisenstadt	–	Tabor, Mt. Taborstraße, listed building	E: 1902–1905	Luth.†	EKBO	F-K
Taborkirche en: Tabor Church	Wilhelmshagen	–	Tabor, Mt. Schönblicker Straße, listed building	E: 1910–1911	Luth.†	EKBO	T-K
Thomaskirche en: Thomas Church	Wittenau	–	Thomas the Apostle Blunckstraße	E: 1968–1969	PC†	BFP	Rein.-df
Trinitatiskirche en: Trinity Church	Charlottenburg	–	Trinity Karl-August-Platz	E: 1896–1898; D: 1943–1945; R: 1951–1953	Luth.†	EKBO	C-W
Umar-Ibn-Al-Khattab-Moschee en: Umar ibn al-Khattab Mosque	Luisenstadt	Ömer İbnu’l Hattâb Camii (i.e. Umar ibn al-Khattab Mosque)	Umar ibn al-Khattab Skalitzer Straße	E: 2008	Isl. Sun.	Ahbash	F-K
United States Army Chapel	Dahlem	All Saints Church, Synagoge Sukkat Schalom (i.e. Sukkat Shalom Synagogue), respectively	All Saints Hüttenweg a simultaneum since 1957, used for the US Army until its decampment from Berlin in 1994	E: 1957	Sim. of Bapt.†, Jew., RC† a. UP†	JGB; AB	S-Z
Vater-Unser-Kirche en: Our Father Church	Wilmersdorf	–	Lord's Prayer Detmolder Straße / Blissestraße / Koblenzer Straße	E: 1959–1961	Luth.†	EKBO	C-W
Verheißungskirche en: Church of Prophecy	Friedrichshain	–	Prophecy Boxhagener Straße, 1879 as cemetery chapel, closed in 1996, profaned in 2006 as Theaterkapelle 10245, listed building	E: 1879; A: 1948–1949	prof. last: Luth.†	EKBO	F-K
Verklärungskirche en: Transfiguration Church	Adlershof	–	Transfiguration of Jesus Arndtstraße / Handjerystraße, listed building	E: 1899–1900	Luth.†	EKBO	T-K
Versöhnungskirche en: Reconciliation Church	Biesdorf	–	Reconciliation, named also in memory of Versöhnungskirche (i.e. Reconciliation Church) in Rosenthaler Vorstadt demolished by the end of 1985 following a command by the GDR government Maratstraße	E: 1986–1988	Luth.† a. Meth.† as guests	EKBO	M-H
Victoria-Congregation en: Victoria Church	Wilmersdorf	Schwedische Kirche (i.e. Swedish Church)	Victoria of Baden Landhausstraße 26–28, church was exploded by Soviet soldiers who were frustrated to have found only vinaigre when they hoped to plunder liqueur	E: 1920–1924; D: 1945; N: 1952–1955	Luth.†	CoSA	C-W
Waldkapelle Zum anklopfenden Christus en: Forest Chapel of Christ knocking at the Door	Rahnsdorf	–	Jesus of Nazareth Waldstraße, listed building	E: 1910	Luth.†	EKBO	T-K
Waldkirche en: Forest Church	Heiligensee	–	Stolpe Heath forest Stolpmünder Weg	E: 1954–1955	Luth.†	EKBO	Rein.-df
Weihnachtskirche en: Christmas Church –	Haselhorst	–	Christmas Haselhorster Damm, listed building	E: 1934–1935; A: 1960–1964	Luth.†	EKBO	Spand.
Wichernkirche en: Wichern Church	Hakenfelde	–	Wichern, Johann Hinrich Wichernstraße, a transportable provisional chapel in Charlottenburg (as of 1897), in Siemensstadt (as of 1908), in Hakenfelde (since 1932)	E: 1896–1897	Luth.†	EKBO	Spand.
Zeus-Sosipolis-Tempel en: Zeus Sosipolis Temple	Museum Island	–	Zeus Sosipolis Pergamon Museum	E: early 2nd millennium before the era A: 1930; A: 1939–1941; R: 1959	prof. last: RaC	?	Mitte
Zionskirche en: Zion's Church	Rosenthaler; Vorstadt	–	Zion Zionskirchplatz, William I donated the church for being saved from Becker's attempt on his life in 1861	E: 1866–1873	Luth.†	EKBO	Mitte
Zufluchtskirche en: Church of Refuge	Falkenhagener Feld	–	Refuge Westerwaldstraße, 1952 est. in a refugee camp for expellees from Former eastern territories of Germany	E: 1965–1967	Luth.†	EKBO	Spand.
Zuversichtskirche en: Church of Confidence	Staaken	–	confidence Brunsbütteler Damm, erected for the West Berlin parishioners of the cross-border congregation of Staaken whose church was in East Germany and sealed off by the Berlin Wall	E: 1962–1966	Luth.†	EKBO	Spand.
Zwinglikirche en: Zwingli Church	Friedrichshain	–	Zwingli, Huldrych Rudolfstraße / Danneckerstraße, listed building	E: 1905–1908	Luth.†	EKBO	F-K
Zwölf-Apostel-Kirche en: Twelve Apostles Church	Schöneberg	Apostelkirche (i.e. Apostles Church)	Twelve Apostles An der Apostelkirche / Kurfürstenstraße, listed building	E: 1871–1874	Luth.†	EKBO	T-S

== Abbreviations for religions and denominations ==
Abbreviations for religions and denominations used in the table:

Religion or denomination or other used entry	abbreviation
Adventist Christianity =	Adv.†
Anglican (Episcopal) Christianity =	Angl.†
Baptist Christianity =	Bapt.†
Buddhism, Mahayana =	Buddh. Mah.
Buddhism, Theravada =	Buddh. Th.
Catholic Apostolic Christianity =	CA†
Christian Science =	CS†
Conservative Judaism =	Jew. Cons.
Evangelicalist Christianity =	Ev.cal†
Judaism =	Jew.
Johannische Kirche Christianity =	JK†
Lutheran Christianity =	Luth.†
Methodist Christianity =	Meth.†
Moravian Christianity =	Morav.†
Mormon Christianity =	Morm.†
New Apostolic Christianity =	NA†
Old Catholic Church in Europe =	OCE†
Orthodox Christianity =	Orth.†
Orthodox Judaism =	Jew. Orth.
Other Christianity = missionary, non-denominational or non-affiliated congregations	Chr.†
Pentecostal Christianity =	PC†
profane use = used for secular purposes	prof.
Reformed Christianity = Calvinist Christianity	Ref.†
Reform Judaism =	Jew. Ref.
Roman Catholic Christianity =	RC†
Sephardic Judaism =	Jew. Seph.
Shi'a Islam =	Isl. Shi'a
Shtundist Christianity =	Sht.†
Simultaneum = a church used by congregations of different denominations	Sim.
Sunni Islam =	Isl. Sun.
United Protestant Christianity =	UP†

== Abbreviations for religious bodies ==
Abbreviations for religious bodies used in the table, a number of abbreviations are officially used and therefore derive from the native named of the bodies:

Religious body or other used entry	Abbreviation
Ahmadiyya Muslim Community =	AMC
Al-Ahbash =	Ahbash
American Church in Berlin =	ACB
Arbeitsgemeinschaft evangelikaler Gemeinden =	AeG
Bulgarian Orthodox Church =	BOC
Catholic Apostolic Church =	CAC
Chabad =	Chabad
Christian Church Outreach Mission =	COM
Christian Science =	1stCC
Coptic Orthodox Church of Alexandria =	COCA
Church of Sweden Abroad =	CoSA
Danish Seamen's Church and Church Abroad =	DCA
Diocese of Gibraltar in Europe =	DiE
Evangelical Church Berlin-Brandenburg-Silesian Upper Lusatia =	EKBO
Evangelical Church of the old-Prussian Union =	APU
Evangelical Lutheran Church in America =	ELCA
Fo Guang Shan Order =	FGS
Free church =	Fr. ch.
Independent Evangelical Lutheran Church =	SELK
Israelitischer Religionsverein Neutempelhof =	IRN
Israelitische Synagogen-Gemeinde Adass Jisroel zu Berlin an Orthodox Jewish congregation =	AJ
Jeschivas Beis Zion =	JBZ
Jüdische Gemeinde zu Berlin a Jewish congregation comprising conservative, orthodox and reform currents =	JGB
Johannische Kirche =	JK
Lahore Ahmadiyya Movement for the Propagation of Islam =	AAIIL
Millî Görüş =	MG
New Apostolic Church =	NAC
Roman Catholic Archdiocese of Berlin =	AB
Roman Catholic Diocese of Berlin =	DB
Russian Orthodox Church Outside Russia =	ROCOR
Serbian Orthodox Eparchy of Düsseldorf and all of Germany =	SOC-D&G
Seventh-day Adventist Church =	7DA
Society of St. Pius X =	SSPX
Syriac Orthodox Church =	Syr.
The Church of Jesus Christ of Latter-day Saints =	CJCLS
Turkish-Islamic Union for Religious Affairs =	DİTİB
Union Evangelischer Kirchen =	UEK
Union of Evangelical Free Church Congregations in Germany =	UFC
Unitas Fratrum =	UF
United Methodist Church =	UMC

== Abbreviations used for the borough names ==
For the names of the twelve boroughs the table uses the following forms:

- Charlottenburg-Wilmersdorf = C-W
- Friedrichshain-Kreuzberg = F-K
- Lichtenberg = Licht.-bg
- Marzahn-Hellersdorf = M-H
- Mitte = Mitte
- Neukölln = Neuk.
- Pankow = Pankow
- Reinickendorf = Rein.-df
- Spandau = Spand.
- Steglitz-Zehlendorf = S-Z
- Tempelhof-Schöneberg = T-S
- Treptow-Köpenick = T-K
