= Clara Herrmann =

German politician (born 1985)

Mayor of Friedrichshain-Kreuzberg
- Incumbent
- Assumed office 6 December 2021
- Preceded by: Monika Herrmann

Member of the Abgeordnetenhaus of Berlin
- In office 26 October 2006 – 27 October 2016

Personal details
- Born: 28 March 1985 (age 41) Berlin
- Party: Alliance 90/The Greens (since 2002)

Clara Herrmann (born 28 March 1985) is a German politician serving as mayor of Friedrichshain-Kreuzberg since 2021. From 2006 to 2016, she was a member of the Abgeordnetenhaus of Berlin, as a member of Alliance 90/The Greens.
