= Timur Husein =

German politician (born 1980)

Member of the Berlin House of Representatives
- Incumbent
- Assumed office 16 March 2023
- Constituency: Friedrichshain-Kreuzberg

Personal details
- Born: 25 October 1980 (age 45)
- Party: Christian Democratic Union (since 1997)

Timur Husein (born 25 October 1980) is a German politician serving as a member of the Berlin House of Representatives since 2023. He has served as chairman of the Christian Democratic Union in Friedrichshain-Kreuzberg since 2019.
