= Friedrichshain-Kreuzberg =

- Borough of Berlin
- Flag Coat of arms

- Location of Friedrichshain-Kreuzberg in Berlin
- Interactive map of Friedrichshain-Kreuzberg
- Location within Germany Location within Berlin
- Coordinates: 52°30′N 13°27′E
- Country: Germany
- State: Berlin
- City: Berlin
- Subdivisions: 2 localities

Government
  - Mayor: Clara Herrmann (Greens)

Area
  - Total: 20.16 km^{2} (7.78 sq mi)

Population (2024-12-31)
  - Total: 266,583
  - Density: 13,220/km^{2} (34,250/sq mi)
- Time zone: UTC+01:00 (CET)
  - Summer (DST): UTC+02:00 (CEST)
- Vehicle registration: B
- Website: official homepage

Friedrichshain-Kreuzberg (German: [ˈfʁiːdʁɪçsˌhaɪn ˈkʁɔʏtsbɛʁk]) is the second borough of Berlin, formed in 2001 by merging the former East Berlin borough of Friedrichshain and the former West Berlin borough of Kreuzberg. The historic Oberbaum Bridge, formerly a Berlin border crossing for pedestrians, links both districts across the river Spree as the new borough's landmark (as featured in the coat of arms).

Subdivisions of Friedrichshain-Kreuzberg

The counterculture tradition especially of Kreuzberg has led to the borough being a stronghold for the Green Party. While Kreuzberg is characterised by a high number of immigrants, the share of non-German citizens in Friedrichshain is much lower and the average age is higher. The merger between the distinct quarters is celebrated by an annual anarchic "vegetable fight" on the Oberbaumbrücke. Both parts have to deal with the consequences of gentrification.

== History ==
The Berlin district of Kreuzberg-Friedrichshain has a rich and complex history that reflects the city's changing political and cultural landscape over the past two centuries.

Located in the heart of the city, Kreuzberg and Friedrichshain were once separate neighborhoods that were united into a single district in 2001. The area is known for its diverse and vibrant cultural scene, as well as its history as a center of political activism and counterculture.

Kreuzberg has a long history as a working-class neighborhood and was heavily damaged during World War II. After the war, the area became home to many immigrants, including Turkish and other migrants from the Middle East and Europe. In the 1970s and 1980s, Kreuzberg became a center of political activism and alternative culture, with a large youth and student population. Friedrichshain, on the other hand, has a more diverse history. It was originally a working-class neighborhood, but was heavily bombed during World War II and then divided by the Berlin Wall after the war. After the fall of the Wall in 1989, Friedrichshain underwent a process of gentrification and became a popular neighborhood for artists, students, and young professionals. In recent years, both Kreuzberg and Friedrichshain have become popular tourist destinations, known for their lively streets, diverse cultural scene, and rich history.

== Subdivision ==
Friedrichshain-Kreuzberg is divided into 2 places, Friedrichshain and Kreuzberg.

== Politics ==
=== District council ===
The governing body of Friedrichshain-Kreuzberg is the district council (Bezirksverordnetenversammlung). It has responsibility for passing laws and electing the city government, including the mayor. The most recent district council election was held on 26 September 2021, and the results were as follows:

Party	Lead candidate	Votes	%	+/-	Seats	+/-
Alliance 90/The Greens (Grüne)	Clara Herrmann	48,254	34.6	▲1.9	22	▲2
The Left (LINKE)	Oliver Nöll	30,124	21.6	▲0.8	13	▲1
Social Democratic Party (SPD)	Andy Hehmke	20,554	14.8	▼2.5	9	▼1
Christian Democratic Union (CDU)	Timur Husein	10,898	7.8	▲0.1	5	▲1
Free Democratic Party (FDP)	Marlene Heihsel	6,561	4.7	▲1.5	3	▲1
Die PARTEI	Riza Cörtlen	5,214	3.7	▼0.9	2	±0
Alternative for Germany (AfD)	Frank Scheermesser	4,333	3.1	▼3.1	1	▼2
Tierschutzpartei		3,185	2.3	New	0	New
Volt Germany		2,922	2.1	New	0	New
Klimaliste		2,329	1.7	New	0	New
dieBasis		2,267	1.6	New	0	New
Bergpartei		989	0.7	New	0	New
The Humanists		528	0.4	New	0	New
We are Berlin		506	0.4	New	0	New
Open List Friedrichshain		321	0.2	New	0	New
Ecological Democratic Party		285	0.2	▼0.2	0	±0
Valid votes		139,270	99.3			
Invalid votes		951	0.7			
Total		140,221	100.0		55	±0
Electorate/voter turnout		198,561	70.6	▲8.5		
Source: Elections Berlin

=== District government ===
The district mayor (Bezirksbürgermeister) is elected by the Bezirksverordnetenversammlung, and positions in the district government (Bezirksamt) are apportioned based on party strength. Clara Herrmann of the Greens was elected mayor on 6 December 2021. Since the 2021 municipal elections, the composition of the district government is as follows:

Councillor	Party	Portfolio
Clara Herrmann	GRÜNE	District Mayor; Finance, Staff, Economy and Culture
Oliver Nöll	LINKE	Deputy Mayor; Labour, Civil Service and Social Affairs
Annika Gerold	GRÜNE	Traffic, Green Spaces, Order and Environment
Andy Hehmke	SPD	Education, Sport and Logistics
Florian Schmidt	GRÜNE	Construction, Planning and Urban Development
Regina Sommer-Wetter	LINKE	Youth, Family and Health
Source: Berlin.de

== Twin towns – sister cities ==
Friedrichshain-Kreuzberg is twinned with:

- Al-Malikiyah, Syria (2017)
- Bergstraße (district), Germany (1969)
- Ingelheim am Rhein, Germany (1971)
- Kadıköy (Istanbul), Turkey (1996)
- Kiryat Yam, Israel (1990)
- Limburg-Weilburg, Germany (1980)
- Oborishte (Sofia), Bulgaria (1999)
- Porta Westfalica, Germany (1968)
- San Rafael del Sur, Nicaragua (1986)
- Szczecin, Poland (1996)
- Wiesbaden, Germany (1964)

== People ==
- Quentin Tarantino (part of his life), actor and film director
- Til Schweiger (part of his life), actor
- Thomas Kretschmann, actor
- Oliver Mommsen, actor
- Meret Becker, actress
- Judith Holofernes, actress
- Dunja Hayali, journalist
- Enie van de Meiklokjes, actress and television moderator
- Nora Tschirner, actress
- Micaela Schäfer, actress
- Patrick von Blume, actor
- Jannik Schümann, actor

== See also ==
- Berlin-Friedrichshain-Kreuzberg – Prenzlauer Berg East
