= Flughafensee =

Lake in Reinickendorf, Berlin, Germany

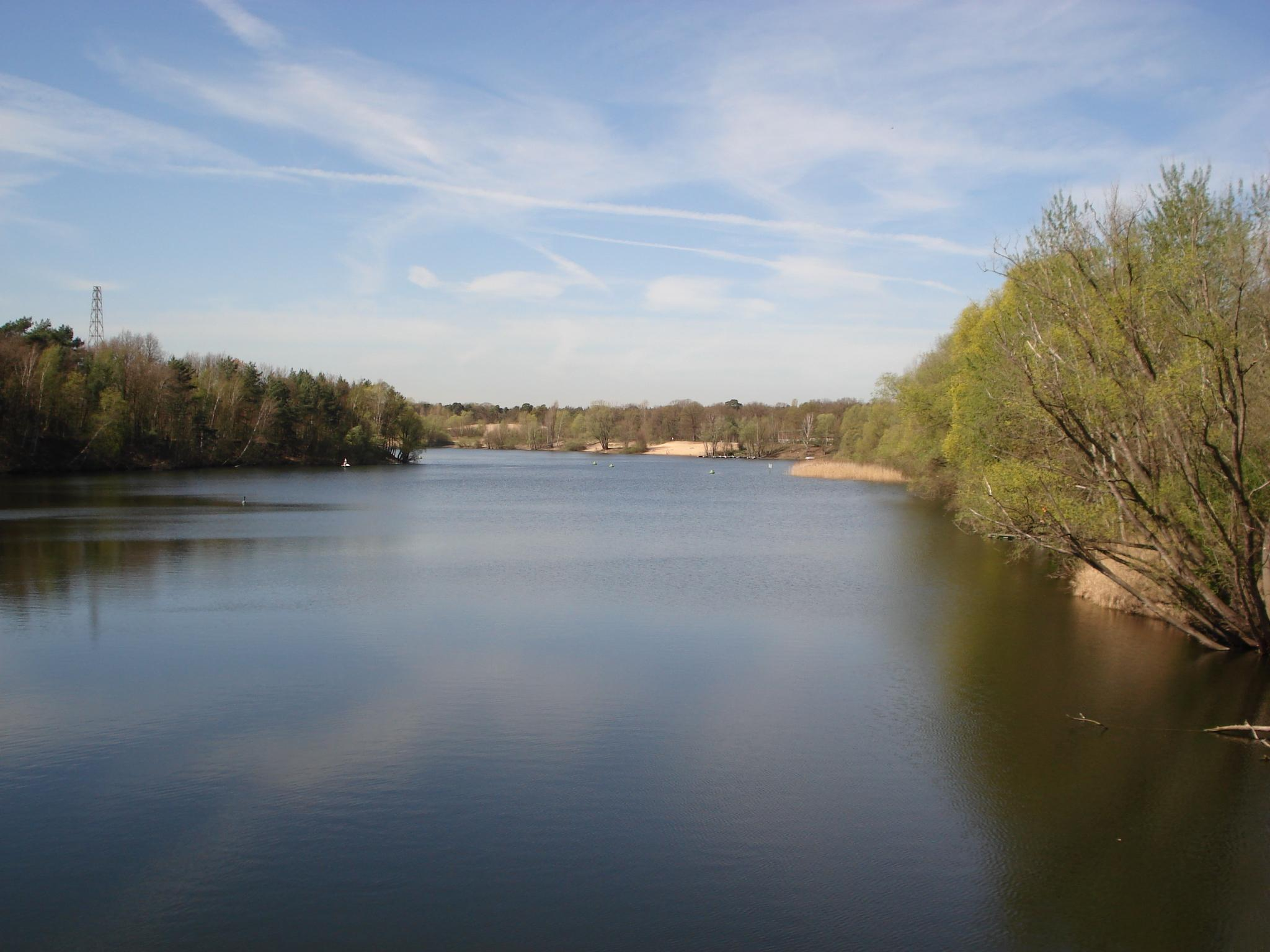

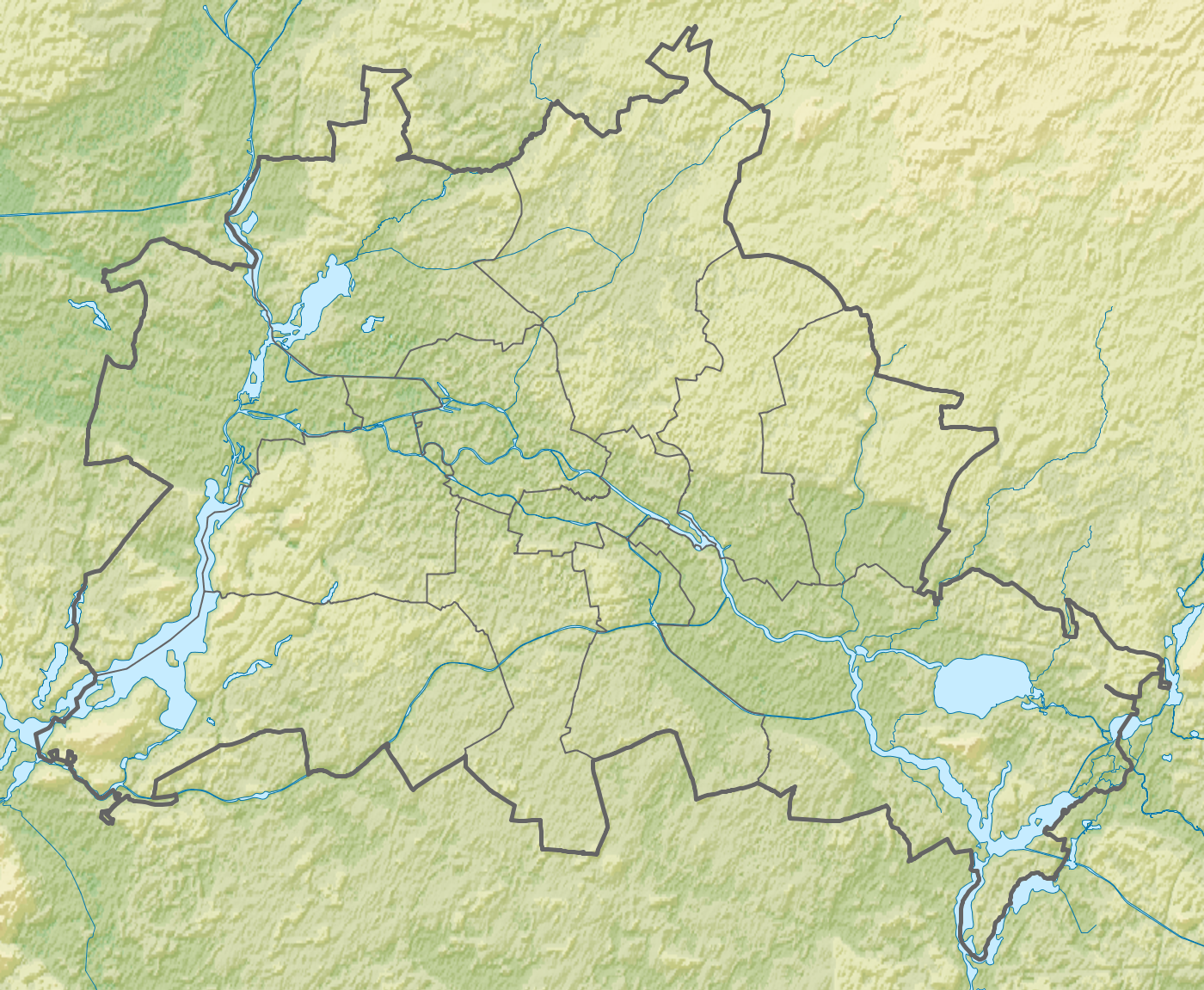
- Location within Berlin
- Location: Tegel Airport, Berlin
- Coordinates: 52°34′N 13°17′E
- Basin countries: Germany
- Max. length: ca. 1,000 m (3,300 ft)
- Max. width: 500 m (1,600 ft)
- Surface area: 30.6 ha (76 acres)
- Average depth: 11.81 m (38.7 ft)
- Max. depth: 34.3 m (113 ft)
- Water volume: 3,610,000 m^{3} (127,000,000 cu ft)
- Shore length^{1}: 3.545 km (2.203 mi)
- ^{1} Shore length is not a well-defined measure.

Flughafensee is a lake near Tegel Airport in the borough of Reinickendorf in Berlin, Germany. Its surface area is 30.6 hectares (76 acres). It was formed by gravel quarrying operations in the period after World War II. After operations were shut down in 1978, it was gradually taken over by the local population as a recreational lake with beaches and an angling club. The lake is surrounded by woodland, part of the Jungfernheide area.
