= EEB =

EEB may refer to:

== Organisations ==
- Eastern Electricity Board, now Eastern Electricity, an English utility
- Ecology and evolutionary biology
- Environment and Ecology Bureau, a Hong Kong policy bureau responsible for environmental regulation
- Euroberlin France (ICAO code), a defunct Franco-German airline
- European Environmental Bureau, a federation of environmental organisations

== Other uses ==
- Enterprise Electronics Bay, a computer motherboard form factor
