= Berlin Tegel Airport =

Former airport in Berlin, Germany

Berlin Tegel "Otto Lilienthal" Airport Flughafen Berlin-Tegel „Otto Lilienthal“

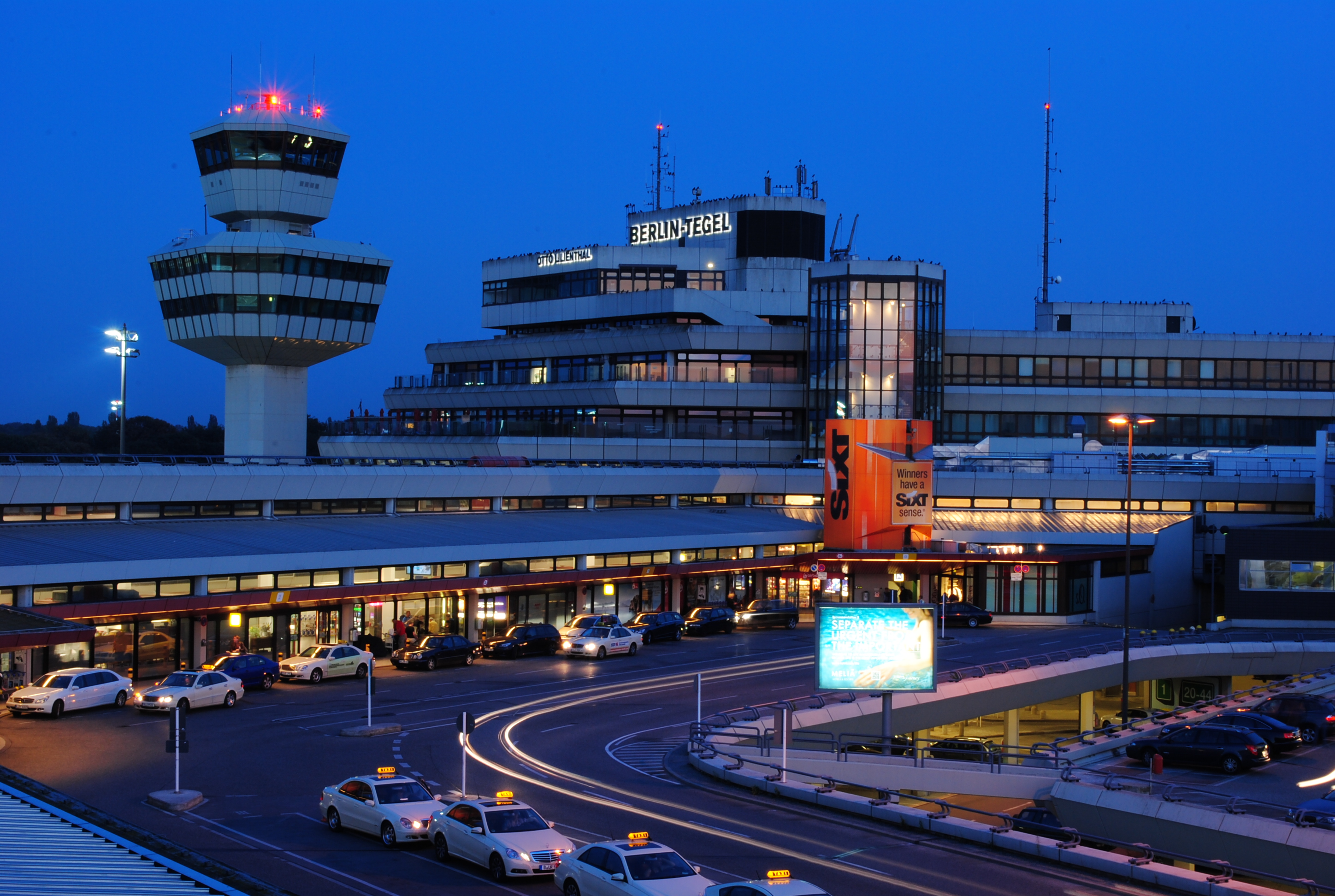
- Tegel Airport in September 2011
- IATA: TXL; ICAO: EDDT

Summary
- Airport type: Defunct
- Operator: Flughafen Berlin Brandenburg GmbH
- Serves: West Berlin (1948–1990); Berlin (1990–2020)
- Location: Tegel, Reinickendorf, Berlin, Germany
- Opened: 1 April 1974
- Closed: 4 May 2021
- Passenger services ceased: 8 November 2020
- Hub for: British Airways (1975–1990); Pan Am (1975–1990); Pan Am Express (1987–1991); Ransome Airlines (1987–1991); Euroberlin France (1988–1994); Air Berlin (1979–2017); Sundair (2017–2020)
- Built: 5 November 1948
- Elevation AMSL: 122 ft (37 m)
- Coordinates: 52°33′35″N 013°17′16″E

Map
- Location within Berlin TXL/EDDB (Germany) TXL/EDDB (Europe)

Runways
Direction	Length		Surface
Direction	m	ft	Surface
08L/26R	3,023	9,918	Asphalt (closed)
08R/26L	2,428	7,966	Asphalt (closed)

Statistics (2019)
- Passengers: 24,227,570
- Passenger change 18–19: ▲ +10.1%
- Sources: Passenger traffic, ACI Europe; German AIP at EUROCONTROL

Berlin Tegel "Otto Lilienthal" Airport (German: Flughafen Berlin-Tegel „Otto Lilienthal“) (IATA: TXL, ICAO: EDDT) was an airport in Berlin, the capital of Germany. In its heyday, it was the city's primary international airport. During the Cold War era, it served West Berlin. The airport was named after aviation pioneer Otto Lilienthal and was the fourth busiest airport in Germany, with over 24 million passengers in 2019. In 2016, Tegel handled over 60% of all airline passenger traffic in Berlin. The airport served as a base for Eurowings, Ryanair and easyJet. It featured flights to several European metropolitan and leisure destinations as well as some intercontinental routes. It was situated in Tegel, a section of the northern borough of Reinickendorf, eight kilometres (five miles) northwest of the city centre of Berlin. Tegel Airport was notable for its hexagonal main terminal building around an open square, which made walking distances as short as 30 m (100 ft) from the aircraft to the terminal exit.

TXL saw its last flight on 8 November 2020 after all traffic had been transferred gradually to the new Berlin Brandenburg Airport. It was legally decommissioned as an airfield after a mandatory transitional period on 4 May 2021. All government flights were also relocated to the new airport with the exception of helicopter operations, which moved to the new airport in October 2025.

The airport's grounds are due to be redeveloped into a new city quarter dedicated to scientific and industrial research named Urban Tech Republic, which is to retain the airport's main building and tower as a repurposed landmark.

== History ==
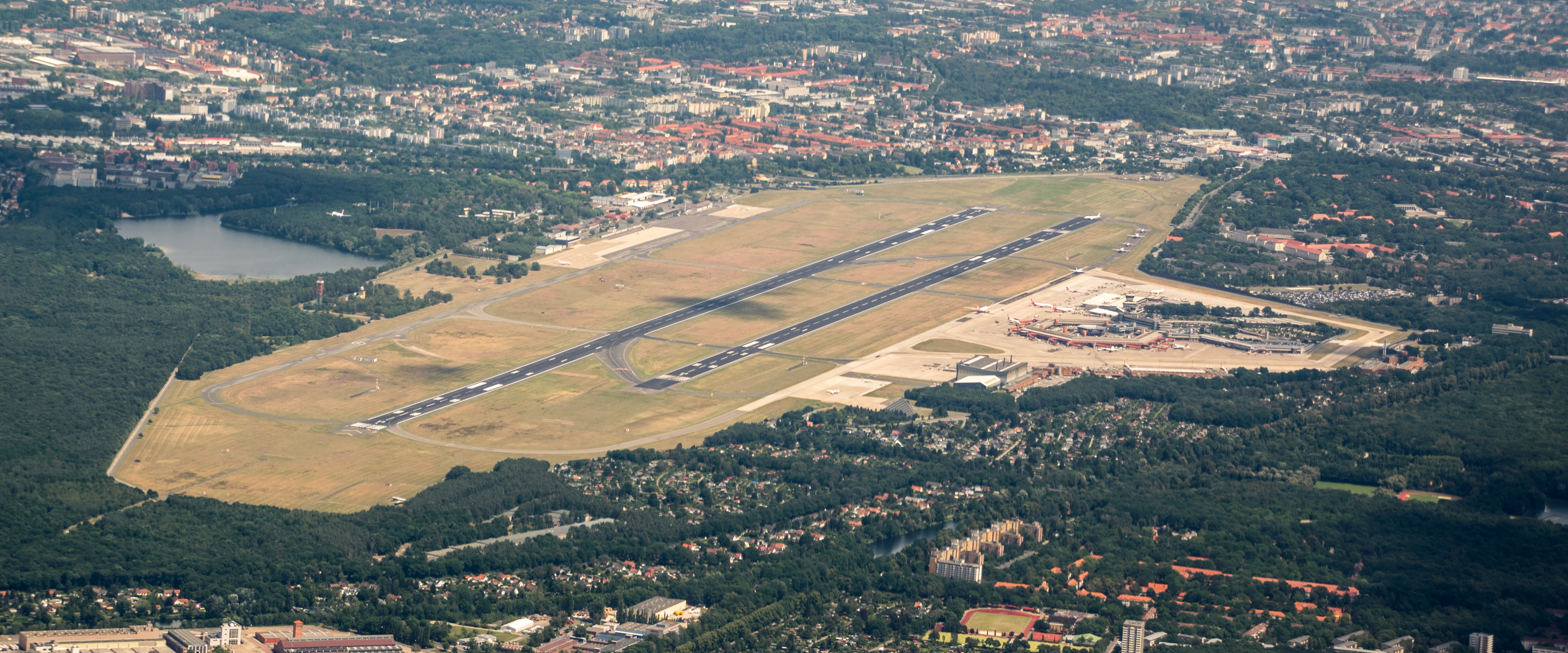
Aerial view of Berlin Tegel Airport

=== Beginnings ===
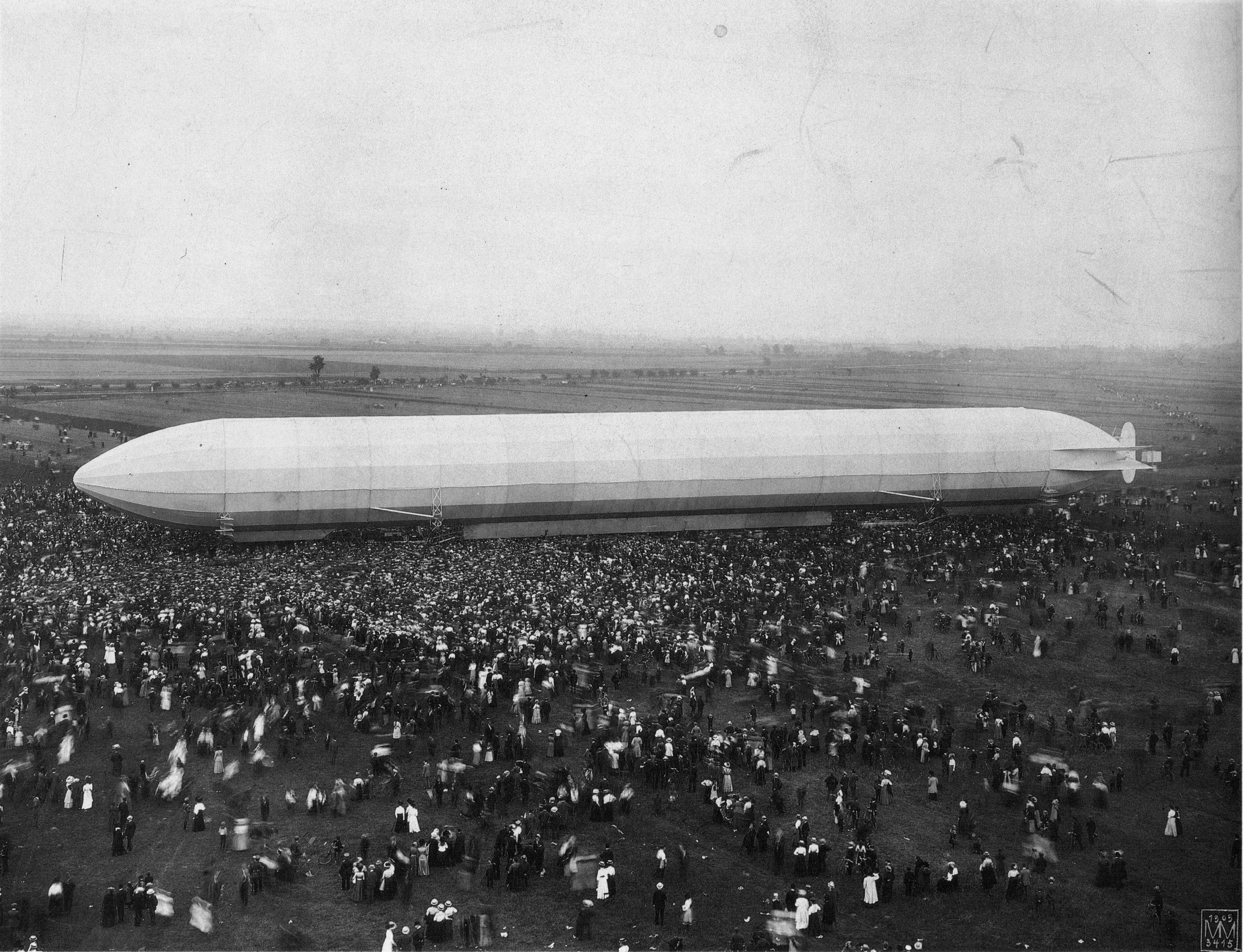
Zeppelin LZ 3 airship at Tegel in 1909

The area of today's airport originally was part of the Jungfernheide forest, which served as a hunting ground for the Prussian nobility. During the 19th century, it was used as an artillery firing range. Aviation history dates back to the early 20th century, when the Royal Prussian airship battalion was based there and the area became known as Luftschiffhafen Reinickendorf. In 1906, a hangar was built for testing of Groß-Basenach and Parseval type airships.

Soon after the outbreak of World War I, on 20 August 1914, the area was dedicated to military training of aerial reconnaissance crews. Following the war, all aviation industry was removed as a consequence of the Treaty of Versailles, which prohibited Germany from having any armed aircraft. On 27 September 1930, Rudolf Nebel launched an experimental rocket testing and research facility on the site. It became known as Raketenschießplatz Tegel and attracted a small group of eminent aerospace engineers that included German rocket pioneer Wernher von Braun. In 1937, the rocket pioneers left Tegel in favour of the secret Peenemünde army research centre.

During World War II, the area served once again as a military training area, mostly for flak troops. It was destroyed in Allied air raids.

=== Cold War era (1948–1990) ===
==== Berlin Airlift ====
Overview of Berlin's airports

Plans for converting the area into allotment gardens were shelved due to the Berlin Blockade, which began on 24 June 1948. In the ensuing Berlin Airlift, it quickly turned out that Berlin's existing main airport at Tempelhof was not big enough to accommodate all relief aircraft. The original planned location for a French-zone airport, the village of Stolpe, had been given to the French by the Soviets in 1945 for this purpose, but it was deemed too far from central Berlin. As a consequence, the French military authorities in charge of Tegel at that time ordered the construction of a 2,428 m (7,966 ft) long runway, the longest in Europe at the time, as well as provisional airport buildings and basic infrastructure. Groundbreaking took place on 5 August 1948, and only 90 days later, on 5 November, a United States Air Force (USAF) Douglas C-54 Skymaster became the first aircraft to land at the new airport. The United States Air Forces in Europe (USAFE) commander-in-chief, General Cannon, and the chief-of-staff of the Anglo-American airlift, General Tunner, arrived at Tegel on this aircraft.

British Dakota and Hastings aircraft carrying essential goods and raw materials began using Tegel on a regular basis from 17 November 1948. Generally, the former carried food and fuel while the latter were loaded with coal. Regular cargo flights with American C-54s followed from 14 December 1948.

The village of Stolpe was occupied on 21 December 1945 by the Soviets in retaliation for the detonation by the French command of Soviet-zone radio towers located in Tegel's approach path on 16 December 1948.

December 1948 also saw three Armée de l'Air Junkers Ju 52/3m transport planes participating in the airlift for the first time. However, the Armée de l'Air contributed to the overall airlift effort in a very small and symbolic way only. As a result of committing the French transport fleet to the growing war effort in Indochina, as well as the joint Anglo-American decision to employ only four-engined planes for the remainder of the airlift to increase the number of flights and the amount of cargo carried on each flight by taking advantage of those aircraft's higher speeds and greater capacities, the French participation ceased.

==== Base aérienne 165 Berlin Tegel ====
Following the end of the Berlin Airlift in May 1949, Tegel became the Berlin base of the Armée de l'Air, eventually leading to the establishment of Base aérienne 165 at Berlin Tegel on 1 August 1964. Tegel was home to a small detachment of the French Army Light Aviation, which used single engined Cessna O-1 Bird Dog from 1968 to 1993, and Sud-Ouest Alouette III Helicopters from May 1987 until June 1994. The Armée de l'Air had a single Max Holste MH1521 Broussard until 1988, when it was replaced by a DeHavilland Canada DHC-6-300 Twin Otter for liaison and surveillance flights.

The end of the Cold War and German reunification resulted in the deactivation of the Western Allies' armed forces in Berlin in July 1994. This in turn led to the decommissioning of Base aérienne 165 the same year.

==== Commercial operations ====
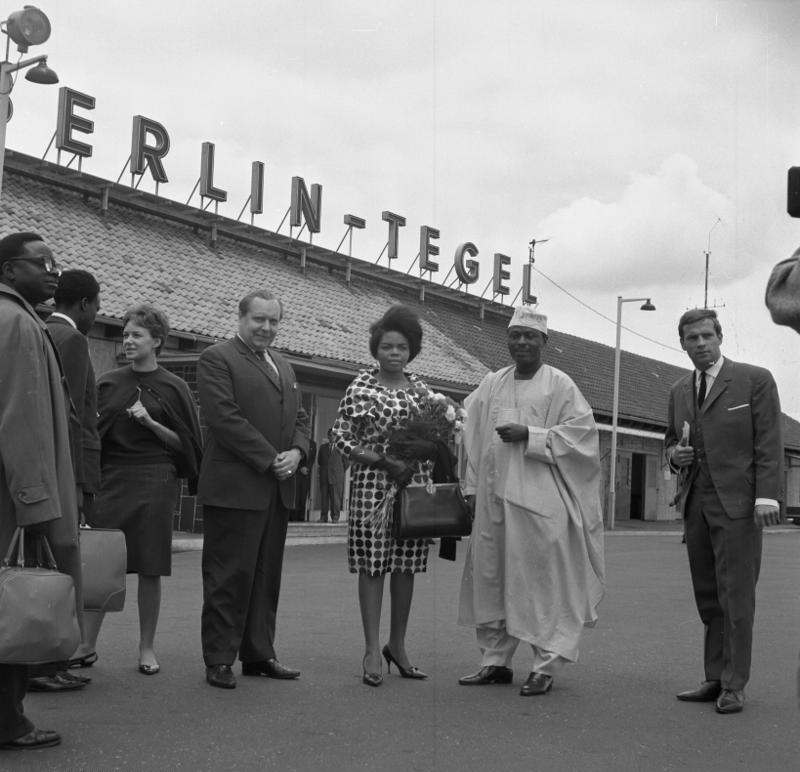
Arrival at Berlin Tegel of a former Nigerian information minister on an official visit to West Berlin on 20 June 1963 (note the original terminal on the airport's north side in the background)

In the late 1950s, the runways at West Berlin's city centre Tempelhof Airport had become too short to accommodate the new-generation jet aircraft such as the Aérospatiale Caravelle, Boeing 707, de Havilland Comet, (Note: except the 4B series, which could operate viably at Tempelhof with a restricted payload) and Douglas DC-8, without imposing payload or range restrictions that made commercial operations unviable.

West Berlin's special legal status during the Cold War era (1945–1990) meant that all air traffic through the Allied air corridors linking the exclave with West Germany was restricted to airlines headquartered in the United States, the United Kingdom, or France – three of the four victorious powers of World War II. In addition, all flightdeck crew (Note: pilots, flight engineers, and navigators) flying aircraft into and out of West Berlin were required to hold American, British, or French passports. During that period, the majority of Tegel's regular commercial flights served West German domestic routes, hub airports in Frankfurt, London, Paris, Amsterdam, points in the United States, and popular holiday resorts in the Mediterranean and Canary Islands.

Initially, all commercial flights used the original terminal building (a pre-fabricated shed), which was situated to the North of the runway, at what is today the military part of the airport.

In 1988, Berlin Tegel was named after German aviation pioneer Otto Lilienthal.

==== Air France ====
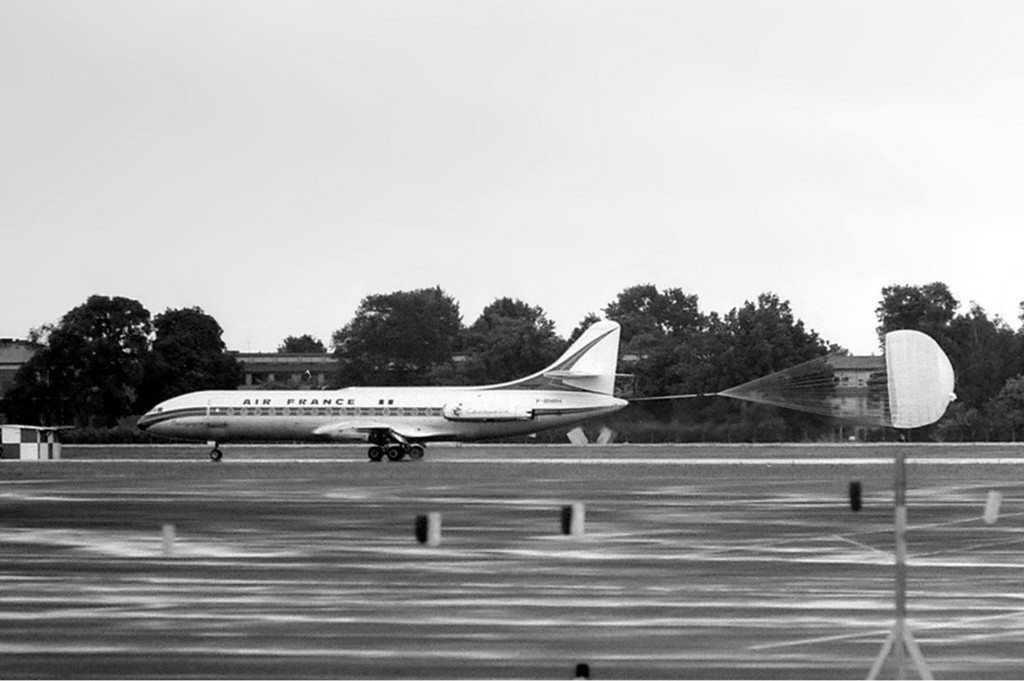
Air France Sud-Aviation Caravelle landing at Berlin Tegel Airport in 1964

Air France was the first airline to commence regular commercial operations at Tegel on 2 January 1960.

On that day, Air France, which had served Düsseldorf, Frankfurt, Munich, Nuremberg, and its main base at Paris Le Bourget/Orly during the previous decade from Tempelhof with Douglas DC-4, Sud-Est Languedoc, and Lockheed Constellation/Super Constellation piston equipment, shifted its entire Berlin operation to Tegel because Tempelhof's runways were too short to permit the introduction of the Sud-Aviation Caravelle, the French flag carrier's new short-haul jet, with a viable payload. (Air France's Caravelle IIIs lacked thrust reversers that would have permitted them to land safely on Tempelhof's short runways with a full commercial payload.

Following the move to Tegel, Air France initially used Lockheed Super Constellation piston equipment on all Berlin flights. On 24 February 1960, Air France became the first airline to introduce jet aircraft on its Berlin routes when the new Caravelles began replacing the Super Constellations. It also became the first and at the time the only one to offer two classes (Note: including a 16-seat first class section on Caravelles (in addition to a 64-seat economy section)) on short-haul flights serving West Berlin.

Following the mid- to late 1960s' introduction by Pan Am and British European Airways (BEA) of jet aircraft with short-field capabilities that were not payload-restricted on Tempelhof's short runways, Air France experienced a traffic decline on those routes where it competed with Pan Am and BEA, mainly as a result of Tegel's greater distance and poorer accessibility from West Berlin's city centre. Over this period, the French airline's market share halved from 9% to less than 5%, despite having withdrawn from Tegel–Düsseldorf in summer 1964 and concentrating its limited resources on Tegel–Frankfurt and Tegel–Munich to maximise the competitive impact on the latter two routes (Air France had already discontinued Berlin–Nuremberg services prior to its move to Tegel). To reverse growing losses on its Berlin routes resulting from load factors as low as 30%, Air France decided to withdraw from the internal German market entirely. This reduced its presence at Tegel to direct scheduled services from/to Paris Orly only. (Initially, Air France continued serving Tegel twice daily from Orly, with one service routing via Frankfurt and the other operating non-stop. The one-stop service was subsequently dropped. This further reduced the airline's presence at Tegel to a single daily, non-stop return flight to/from Paris Orly.) In spring 1969, Air France entered into a joint venture with BEA. This arrangement entailed BEA taking over Air France's two remaining German domestic routes to Frankfurt and Munich and operating these with its own aircraft and flightdeck crews from Tempelhof. The Air France-BEA joint venture terminated in autumn 1972.

From 1 November 1972, the daily Air France service between Orly and Tegel routed via Cologne in both directions to maintain the airline's internal German traffic rights from/to Berlin.

On 1 April 1973, Air France re-introduced a daily non-stop Orly–Tegel rotation to complement the daily service via Cologne. The additional daily service consisted of an evening inbound and early morning outbound flight, which included a night stop for both aircraft and crew in Berlin. To improve capacity utilisation on its Berlin services and cut down on aircraft parking as well as crew accommodation costs, from 1 April 1974, Air France routed both of its daily Orly–Tegel services via Cologne, with aircraft and crew returning to their base at Paris Orly the same day. From 1 November that year, Air France's Berlin flights switched to the French capital's then new Charles de Gaulle (CDG) Airport.

The arrival at Berlin Tegel of an Air France Aérospatiale-BAC Concorde on 17 January 1976 marked the Berlin debut of the Anglo-French supersonic airliner. Two-and-a-half months later, at the start of the 1976 summer timetable, Air France introduced a third daily CDG–Tegel frequency. The new night-stopping service routed via Düsseldorf and utilised the Boeing 727-200, a bigger aircraft than the Caravelles used on the company's other services from/to Berlin.

Air France subsequently routed all of its CDG–Tegel flights via Düsseldorf and standardised the aircraft equipment on the 727-200/200 Adv. The 727-200/200 Adv continued to operate most of Air France's Berlin services until the end of the 1980s, when they were gradually replaced with state-of-the-art Airbus A320s and more modern Boeing 737s. Indeed, the first ever A320 commercial service was a flight between Paris and Berlin Tegel via Düsseldorf, on 8 April 1988.

==== Pan American World Airways ====
Pan Am followed Air France into Tegel in May 1964, with a year-round, thrice-weekly direct service to New York JFK, which was operated with Boeing 707s or Douglas DC-8s. These aircraft could not operate from Tempelhof – the airline's West Berlin base at the time – with a viable payload. Launched with DC-8 equipment routing through Glasgow Prestwick in Scotland, frequency subsequently increased to four flights a week, while the intermediate stop was cut out. Following the introduction in April 1971 of a daily Berlin Tempelhof–Hamburg Fuhlsbüttel–London Heathrow 727 feeder flight that connected with the airline's transatlantic services at the latter airport, Pan Am withdrew its non-stop Tegel–JFK service at the end of the summer timetable, in October of that year.

Following the cessation of direct Tegel–New York City scheduled services, Pan Am continued to operate affinity group/Advance Booking Charter (ABC) flights from Tegel to the US on an ad hoc basis.

From the start of the 1974–75 winter season, Pan Am began operating a series of short- and medium-haul week-end charter flights from Tegel under contract to a leading West German tour operator. These flights served popular resorts in the Alpine region and the Mediterranean. Following a major reduction in the airline's scheduled activities at Tempelhof as a result of co-ordinating its flight times with British Airways (rather than operating competitive schedules), this helped increase utilisation of the 727s based at that airport, especially on weekends.

In addition to operating a limited number of commercial flights from Tegel prior to its move from Tempelhof on 1 September 1975, Pan Am used it as a diversion airfield. The move from Tempelhof to Tegel resulted in all of Pan Am's Berlin operations being concentrated at the latter.

1976 was the first year since 1972 the steady decline in scheduled domestic air traffic from and to West Berlin was arrested and reversed. The first expansion in Pan Am's Berlin operation since the move to Tegel occurred during that year's Easter festival period, when the airline temporarily stationed a Boeing 707-320B at the airport to cope with the seasonal rush on the prime Berlin–Frankfurt route.

From late 1979, Pan Am began updating its Berlin fleet. This entailed phasing out all 727-100s by 1983. The first stage involved replacing two of the 13 German-based aircraft with a pair of stretched Boeing 727-200s originally destined for Ozark Air Lines to add more capacity to Berlin–Frankfurt. This was followed by an order for eight additional 727-200s, with deliveries slated to begin in October 1981. After initially cancelling the order due to the airline's deteriorating finances and economic environment, it was subsequently reinstated, with deliveries due to commence in December 1981.

In the interim, a number of Boeing 737-200/200 Adv were leased from 1982.

The largest-ever expansion of Pan Am's scheduled internal German services occurred during summer 1984, when the airline's aircraft movements at Tegel increased by 20%. This coincided with the relocation of the US carrier's German and Central European headquarters from Frankfurt to Berlin on 1 May 1984.

Pan Am began introducing wide-body aircraft on its Berlin routes in the mid-1980s. Up to four Airbus A300s replaced 727-200s on Berlin–Frankfurt. The A300s were subsequently replaced with Airbus A310s. The longer-range A310-300s that joined Pan Am's fleet from 1987 enabled reintroduction of non-stop, daily Tegel–JFK scheduled services.

Pan Am Express, the regional commuter arm of Pan Am, began operating from Berlin Tegel in November 1987 with two ATR 42 commuter turboprops. It operated year-round scheduled services to secondary and tertiary destinations that could not be viably served with Pan Am's Tegel-based "mainline" fleet of Boeing 727-200s and Airbus A310s. These included Basel, Bremen, Dortmund, Hanover, Innsbruck, Kassel, Kiel, Milan, Salzburg, Stockholm and Vienna. In addition, Pan Am Express also helped Pan Am increase the number of flights on some of the other scheduled routes it used to serve from Berlin such as Tegel–Zürich by operating additional off-peak frequencies.

==== British Airways ====
British Airways was the last of West Berlin's three main scheduled carriers to commence regular operations from Tegel following the move from Tempelhof on 1 September 1975. However, like Pan Am, it and its predecessor BEA had used the airport as a diversion airfield before. Initially, all British Airways services from Tegel—with the exception of the daily non-stop service to London Heathrow—continued to be operated by BAC One-Eleven 500s. The daily London–Heathrow non-stop was operated with Hawker Siddeley Trident 2E/3B equipment based at that airport until the end of the 1975 summer season. (It subsequently reverted to a One-Eleven 500 operation.)

From 1983, British Airways began updating its Berlin fleet. This entailed phasing out the ageing One-Elevens, which were replaced with new Boeing 737-200 Adv. During the second half of the 1980s, British Airways augmented its Berlin 737s with regional airliners. These initially comprised British Aerospace (BAe) 748s (from 1986) and subsequently BAe ATPs (from 1989). The introduction of these turboprops enabled the airline to serve shorter and thinner regional domestic routes from Berlin more economically. It also permitted a frequency increase, thereby enhancing competitiveness.

==== Other operators ====
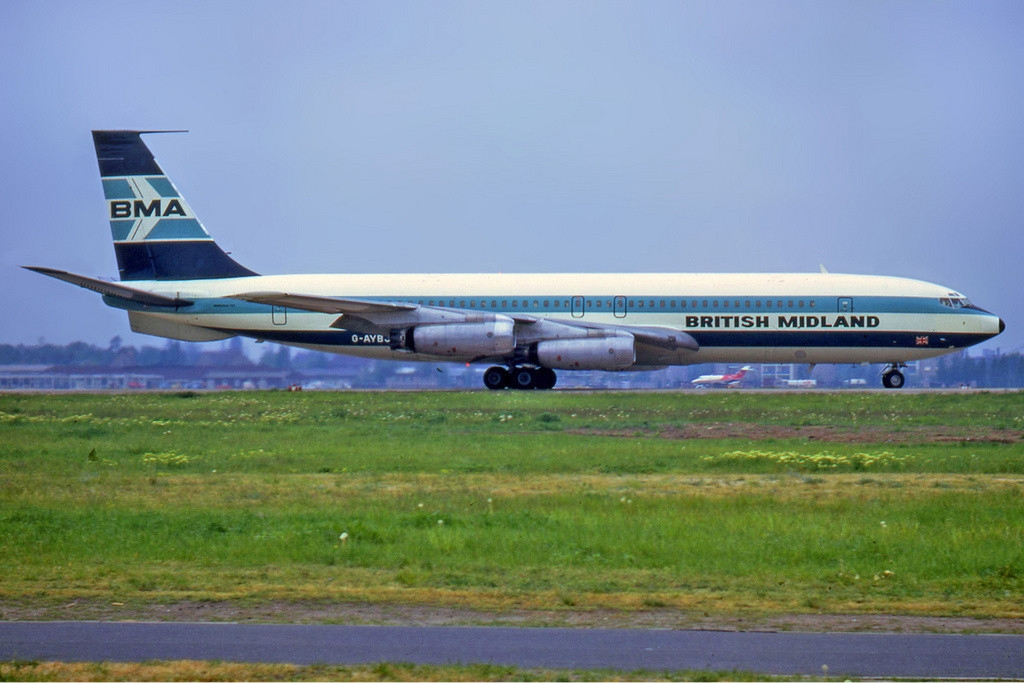
British Midland Boeing 707-320 at Berlin Tegel Airport in 1972

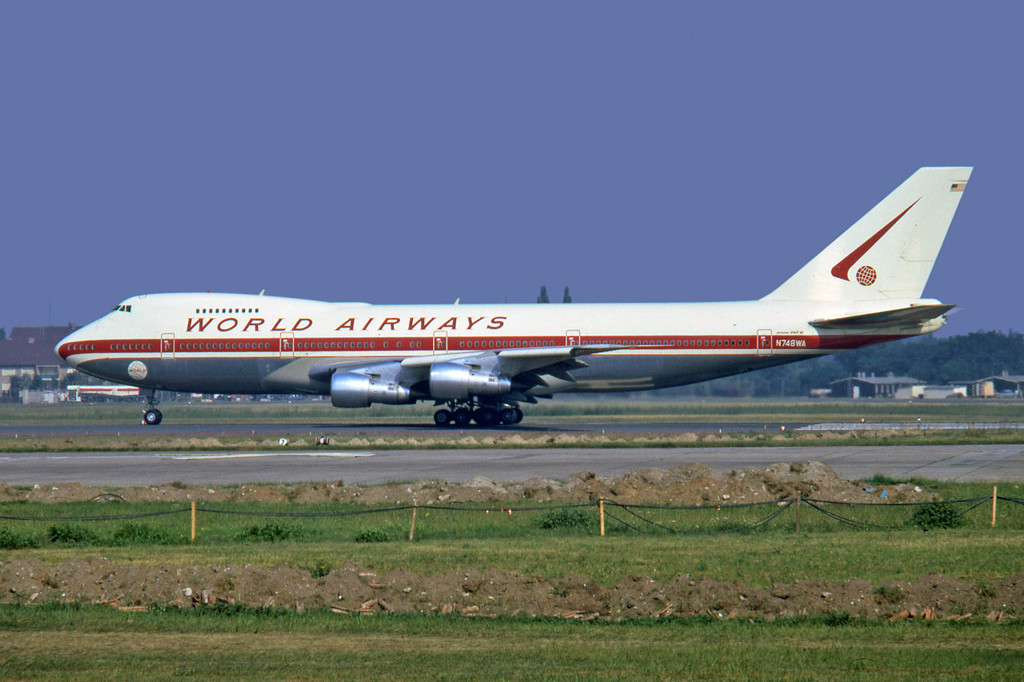
World Airways Boeing 747-200 at Berlin Tegel Airport in 1973

From 1966 until 1968, UK independent Lloyd International was contracted by Neckermann und Reisen, the tour operator of West German mail-order concern Neckermann, to launch a series of inclusive tour (IT) flights from Tegel. These flights were operated with Bristol Britannia turboprops. They served principal European holiday resorts in the Mediterranean and the Canary Islands.

From April 1968, all non-scheduled services, i.e. primarily the rapidly growing number of IT holiday flights that several UK independent (Note: independent from government-owned corporations) airlines as well as a number of US supplemental carriers (Note: holders of supplemental air carrier certificates authorised to operate non-scheduled passenger and cargo services to supplement the scheduled operations of certificated route air carriers; airlines holding supplemental air carrier certificates are also known as "nonskeds" in the US) had mainly operated from Tempelhof since the early 1960s under contract to West Berlin's leading package tour operators, were concentrated at Tegel. This traffic redistribution between West Berlin's two commercial airports was intended to alleviate Tempelhof's increasing congestion and to make better use of Tegel, which was underutilised at the time.

During that period, the Allied charter carriers had begun replacing their obsolete propliners with contemporary turboprop and jet aircraft types, which suffered payload and range restrictions on Tempelhof's short runways. The absence of such restrictions at Tegel gave airlines greater operational flexibility regarding aircraft types and destinations. This was the reason charter carriers favoured Tegel despite being less popular than Tempelhof because of its greater distance from West Berlin's city centre and poor public transport links.

A new passenger handling facility exclusively dedicated to charter airline passengers was opened to accommodate the additional traffic. Both this facility (a wooden shed) and the original terminal used by Air France's and Pan Am's scheduled passengers were located on the airport's north side.

Following the transfer of all charter traffic to Tegel, British Eagle, Dan-Air Services, Invicta International Airlines, Laker Airways and Modern Air Transport began stationing several of their jets at the airport.

While British Eagle's and Invicta's presence at Tegel lasted only for the 1968 summer season, Dan-Air, Laker Airways, and Modern Air were present at the airport for a number of years.

In March 1971, Channel Airways began stationing aircraft at Tegel as well; however, its presence at the airport lasted only until the end of that year's summer season.

Channel Airways's collapse in early 1972 provided the impetus for Dan-Air to take over the failed carrier's charter contracts and to expand its own operations at Tegel.

Dan-Air, one of Britain's foremost wholly private, independent airlines during the 1970s and 80s, eventually became the third-biggest operator at Tegel Airport, ahead of Air France. In addition to firmly establishing itself as the airport's and West Berlin's leading charter airline, it also operated scheduled services linking Tegel with Amsterdam Schiphol, Saarbrücken and London–Gatwick, its main operating base. By the time that airline was taken over by British Airways at the end of October 1992, it had served Tegel Airport for a quarter of a century.

Modern Air's departure in October 1974 coincided with Aeroamerica's arrival. That carrier's departure following the end of the 1979 summer season was followed by Air Berlin USA's arrival.

Laker Airways's decision to replace its Tegel-based BAC One-Eleven fleet with one of its newly acquired Airbus A300 B4 widebodies from the 1981 summer season resulted in Monarch Airlines taking over that airline's long-standing charter contract with Flug-Union Berlin, one of West Berlin's leading contemporary tour operators.

In the late 1980s, Monarch Airlines provided the aircraft as well as the flightdeck crew and maintenance support for Euroberlin France, a Tegel-based scheduled airline headquartered in Paris, France. Euroberlin was jointly owned by Air France and Lufthansa, with the former holding a 51% majority stake, thereby making it a French legal entity and enabling it to conduct commercial airline operations in West Berlin.

The following airlines operated regular services to/from Tegel Airport during the Cold War era as well:

- Court Line Aviation was a major British independent airline of the early 1970s that served Berlin Tegel with a series of regular charter flights from its base at London–Luton and Paris Le Bourget Airport between 1970 and 1974 under contract to the students travel company of Berlin's Technical University.
- Touraine Air Transport was a French regional airline serving Berlin Tegel from Saarbrücken several times a day on a year-round basis from late 1978 until early 1984.
- Berlin European UK was a Berlin-based UK regional airline founded in 1986 as Berlin Regional UK by a former British Airways general manager for that airline's Berlin operation to begin domestic and international regional scheduled services to destinations not served by any of West Berlin's contemporary scheduled operators from April 1987, utilising BAe Jetstream commuter turboprop planes.
- Trans World Airlines (TWA), the other major US flag carrier of that era, used to operate affinity group/ABC flights from Tegel to the USA on an ad hoc basis during the early 1970s. When it entered the West Berlin scheduled market in the late 1980s, it initially served Brussels twice daily from Berlin Tegel (from 2 August 1987). Daily flights to Frankfurt Airport followed (from 1989). Eventually, Berlin Tegel became an important spoke for TWA in Europe, following the launch of additional services to Zürich (via Stuttgart) and Amsterdam (via Hamburg). The Berlin Boeing 727-100s connected with transatlantic 747s and L-1011s at Brussels, Frankfurt, Zürich and Amsterdam.

In addition to the aforementioned airlines, a host of others – mainly British independents and US supplementals – were frequent visitors to Berlin Tegel, especially during the early 1970s. These included Britannia Airways, British Airtours, British United, Caledonian, Caledonian/BUA / British Caledonian, Capitol International Airways, Overseas National Airways, Saturn Airways, Trans International Airlines, Transamerica Airlines and World Airways. During that period, the airport scene at Berlin Tegel could be very colourful, with Air France Caravelles, the UK independents' BAC One-Elevens, de Havilland Comets, and Hawker Siddeley Tridents as well as the US supplementals' Boeing 707s, Convair Coronados and Douglas DC-8s congregating on its ramp. During 1974 alone, 22 airlines were operating at Tegel Airport.

==== Tegel's new terminal takes shape ====
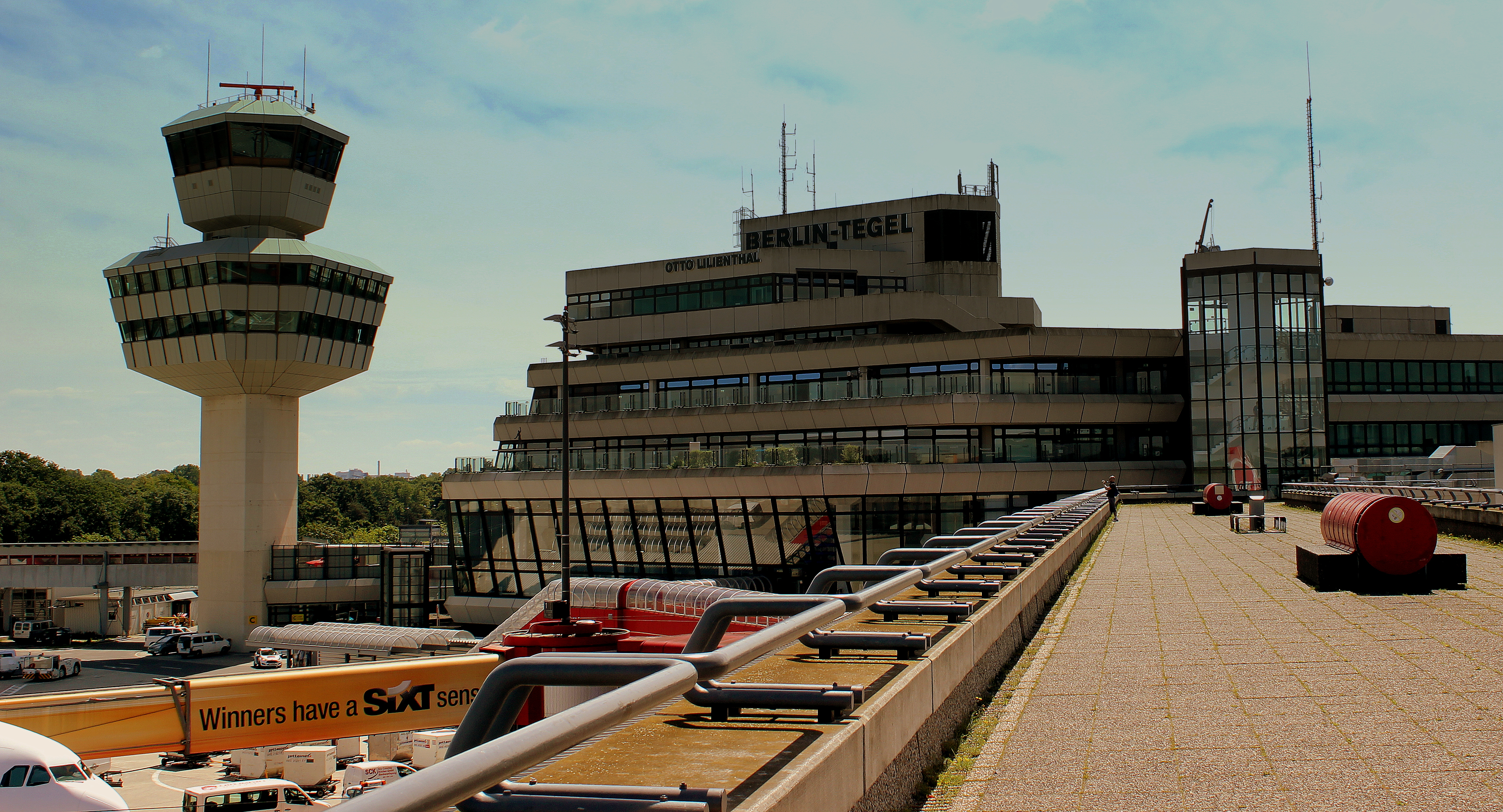
The main building with Terminals A and B, inaugurated in November 1974

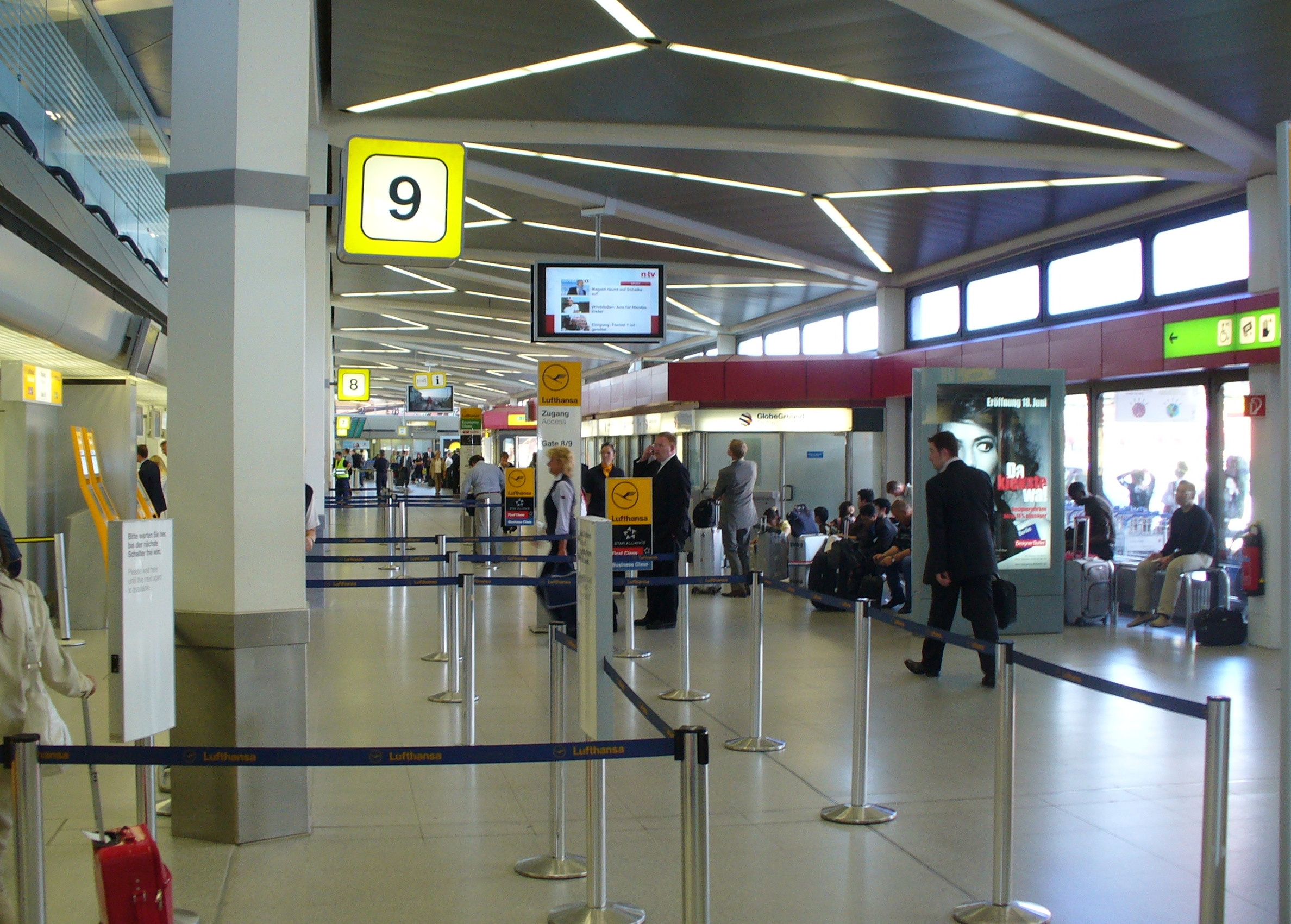
Tegel Airport was famous for its short walking distances, as seen here in Terminal A: buses, taxis and cars can drop off passengers outside the windows on the right; check-in and direct gate access are on the left.

Construction of a new, hexagonally shaped terminal complex on the airport's south side began during the 1960s. This coincided with the lengthening of the runways to permit fully laden widebodied aircraft to take off and land without restricting their range and construction of a motorway and access road linking the new terminal to the city centre. It became operational on 1 November 1974.

A British Airways L-1011 Tristar, a Laker Airways McDonnell-Douglas DC-10-10, a Pan Am Boeing 747-100 and an Air France Airbus A300B2 were among the widebodied aircraft specially flown in for a pre-inauguration of the new terminal on 23 October 1974. Dan-Air operated the first commercial flight to arrive at the airport's new terminal at 06.00 am local time with a BAC One-Eleven that was inbound from Tenerife.

==== Tegel becomes West Berlin's main airport ====
Following Pan Am's and British Airways's move from Tempelhof to Tegel on 1 September 1975, the latter replaced Tempelhof as the main airport of West Berlin.

=== Early post-reunification era (1990–1995) ===
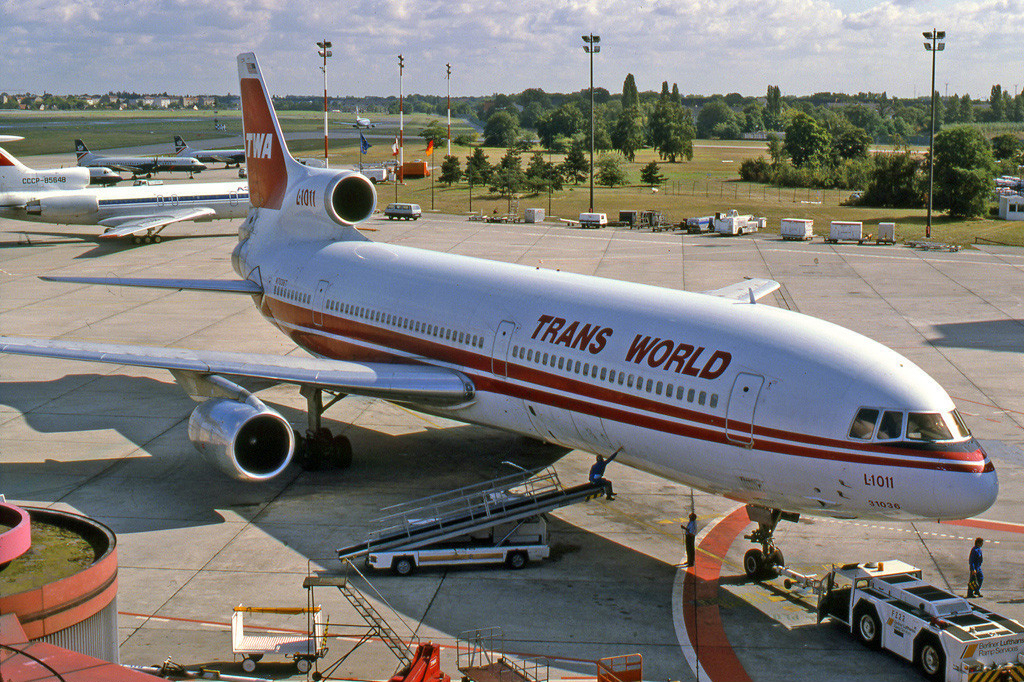
TWA Lockheed L-1011 at Berlin Tegel Airport in 1991

Following Germany's reunification on 3 October 1990, all access restrictions to the former West Berlin airports were lifted.

Lufthansa resumed flights to Berlin on 28 October 1990, initially operating twelve daily pairs of flights on a limited number of routes, including Tegel–Cologne, Tegel–Frankfurt and Tegel–London Gatwick. To facilitate the German flag carrier's resumption of services from/to Berlin, it purchased Pan Am's Internal German Services (IGS) division for US$150 million. This included Pan Am's internal German traffic rights as well as its gates and slots at Tegel. This agreement, under which Lufthansa contracted up to seven of Pan Am's Tegel-based Boeing 727-200s operated by that airline's flightdeck and cabin crews to ply its scheduled routes to Munich, Nuremberg and Stuttgart until mid-1991, also facilitated Pan Am's orderly exit from the internal German air transport market after 40 years' uninterrupted service as European Union (EU) legislation prevented it from participating in the internal air transport market of the EU/European Economic Area (EEA) as a non-EU/EEA headquartered carrier. However, Pan Am continued operating its non-stop Tegel–JFK service until Delta Air Lines assumed most of Pan Am's transatlantic scheduled services in November 1991. Pan Am Express, which was not included in Pan Am's IGS sale to Lufthansa, continued operating all of its domestic and international regional scheduled routes from Tegel as an independent legal entity until its acquisition by TWA in 1991. Following TWA's takeover of Pan Am Express, the former Pan Am Express Berlin operations were closed. Until December 1994, Lufthansa also contracted Euroberlin to operate some of its internal German flights from its new Tegel base, making use of that airline's gates and slots at Tegel as well.

As a US-registered airline, Air Berlin found itself in the same situation as Pan Am following German reunification. It chose to reconstitute itself as a German company.

These were the days when liberalisation of the EU/EEA internal air transport market was still in progress and when domestic traffic rights were reserved for each member country's own airlines. The German government therefore insisted that all non-German EU/EEA carriers either withdraw their internal German scheduled services from Berlin or transfer them to majority German-owned subsidiaries by the end of 1992. It also wanted the bulk of all charter flights from Berlin to be operated by German airlines. These measures were squarely aimed at UK carriers with a major presence in the internal German air transport market from Berlin as well as the city's charter market, specifically British Airways and Dan-Air. Lufthansa and other German airlines reportedly lobbied their government to curtail British Airways's and Dan-Air's activities in Berlin, arguing that German airlines enjoyed no equivalent rights in the UK. This resulted in British Airways taking a 49% stake in Friedrichshafen-based German regional airline Delta Air, renaming it Deutsche BA (DBA) and transferring its internal German traffic rights to the new airline. BA also replaced the commuter aircraft DBA had inherited from Delta Air with new Boeing 737-300s. These in turn replaced the Boeing 737-200 Adv and BAe ATP airliners British Airways had used on its internal German scheduled services from Berlin.

At the time of German reunification, Dan-Air's Berlin fleet numbered five aircraft, comprising three Boeing 737s (one −400, one −300 and one 200 Adv) and two HS 748s. The former were used to fly locally based holidaymakers from Tegel to overseas resorts on IT flights under contract to German package tour operators. The latter operated the airline's scheduled routes linking Tegel with Amsterdam and Saarbrücken. Dan-Air discontinued its charter operations from Berlin on behalf of German tour operators at the end of the 1990–91 winter season and replaced the ageing 748 turboprop it had used on its Amsterdam schedule since the mid-1980s with larger, more advanced BAe 146 100 series jets. It also introduced new direct scheduled air links from Berlin to Manchester and Newcastle via Amsterdam. The Saarbrücken route was withdrawn at the end of the 1991 summer season, while the Amsterdam route was gradually taken over by NLM CityHopper, the contemporary regional arm of Dutch flag carrier KLM. This reduced Dan-Air's presence in Berlin to a single daily scheduled service as well as up to four weekly charter flights linking the airline's Gatwick base with its former overseas base at Tegel. Flights were operated by Gatwick aircraft and crews until the firm's takeover by British Airways at the end of October 1992. The restructuring of Dan-Air's long-established Berlin operation was not only the result of political changes. It was also driven by its own corporate restructuring, which aimed to refocus the airline as a Gatwick-based short-haul "mainline" scheduled operator and involved phasing out its smaller aircraft and thinner routes.

Other airlines that commenced/resumed scheduled operations from Berlin Tegel at the beginning of the post-reunification era included Aero Lloyd, Alitalia, American Airlines, Austrian Airlines, SAS Eurolink, Swissair, TWA and United Airlines.

Aero Lloyd, Germania and Condor Berlin began operating charter flights from Berlin Tegel during that period.

=== 1995 onwards ===
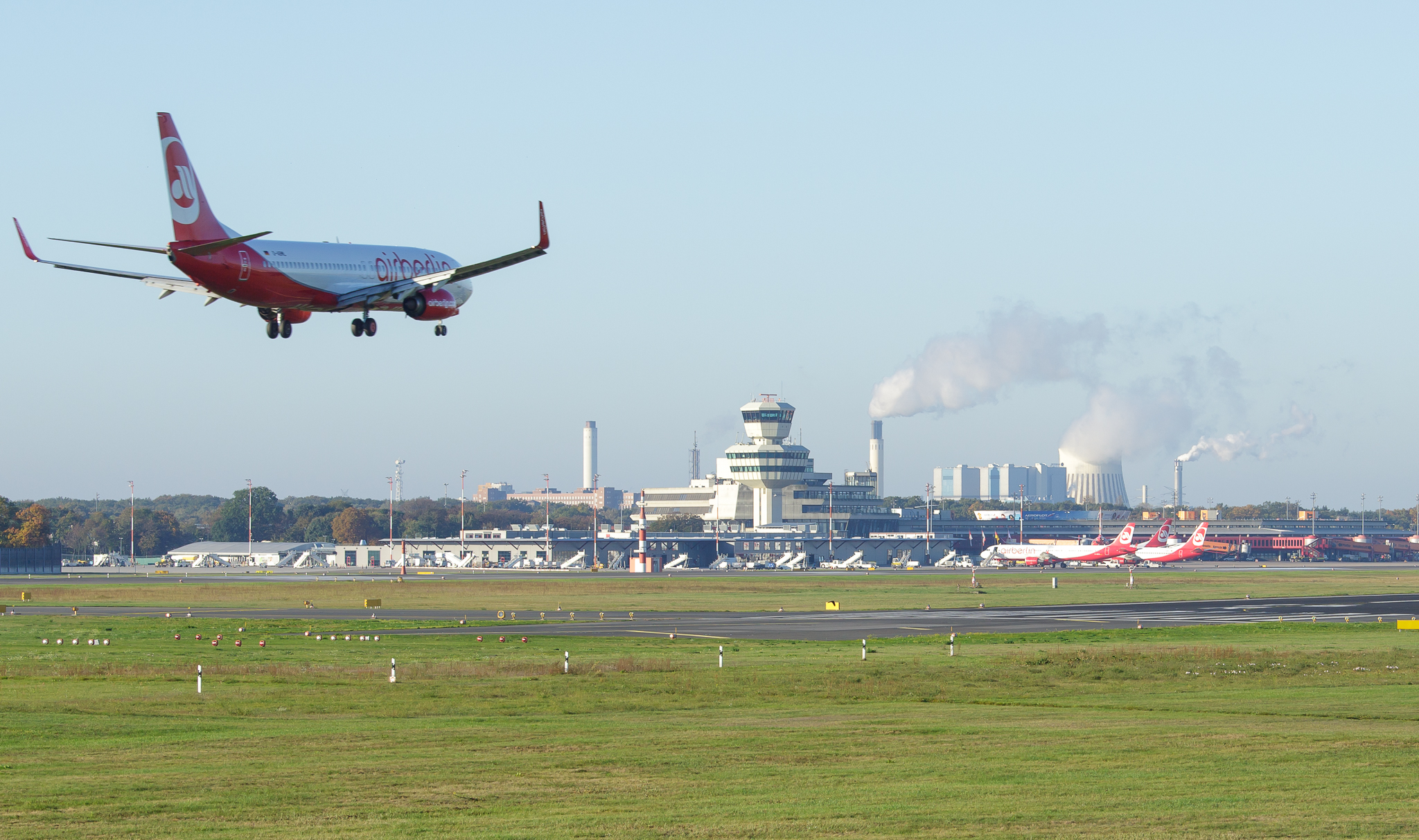
Berlin Tegel Airport in 2014

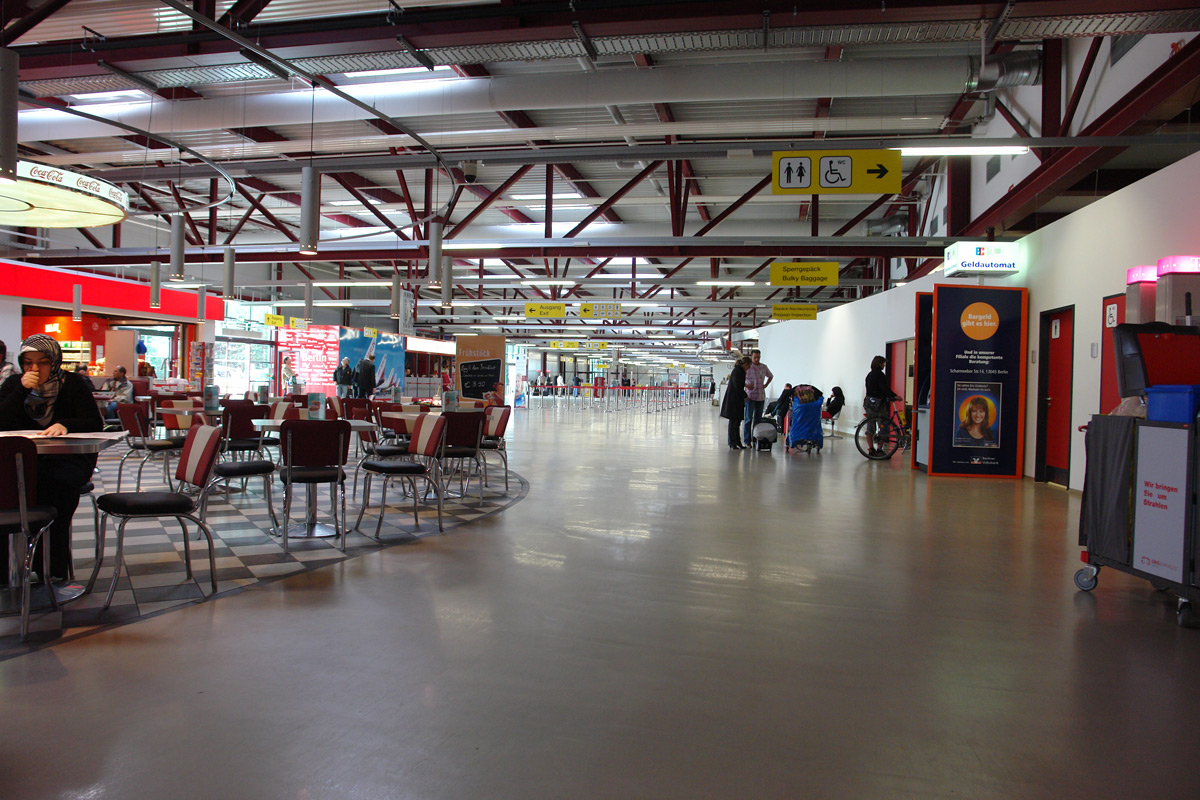
Check-in-area at Terminal C

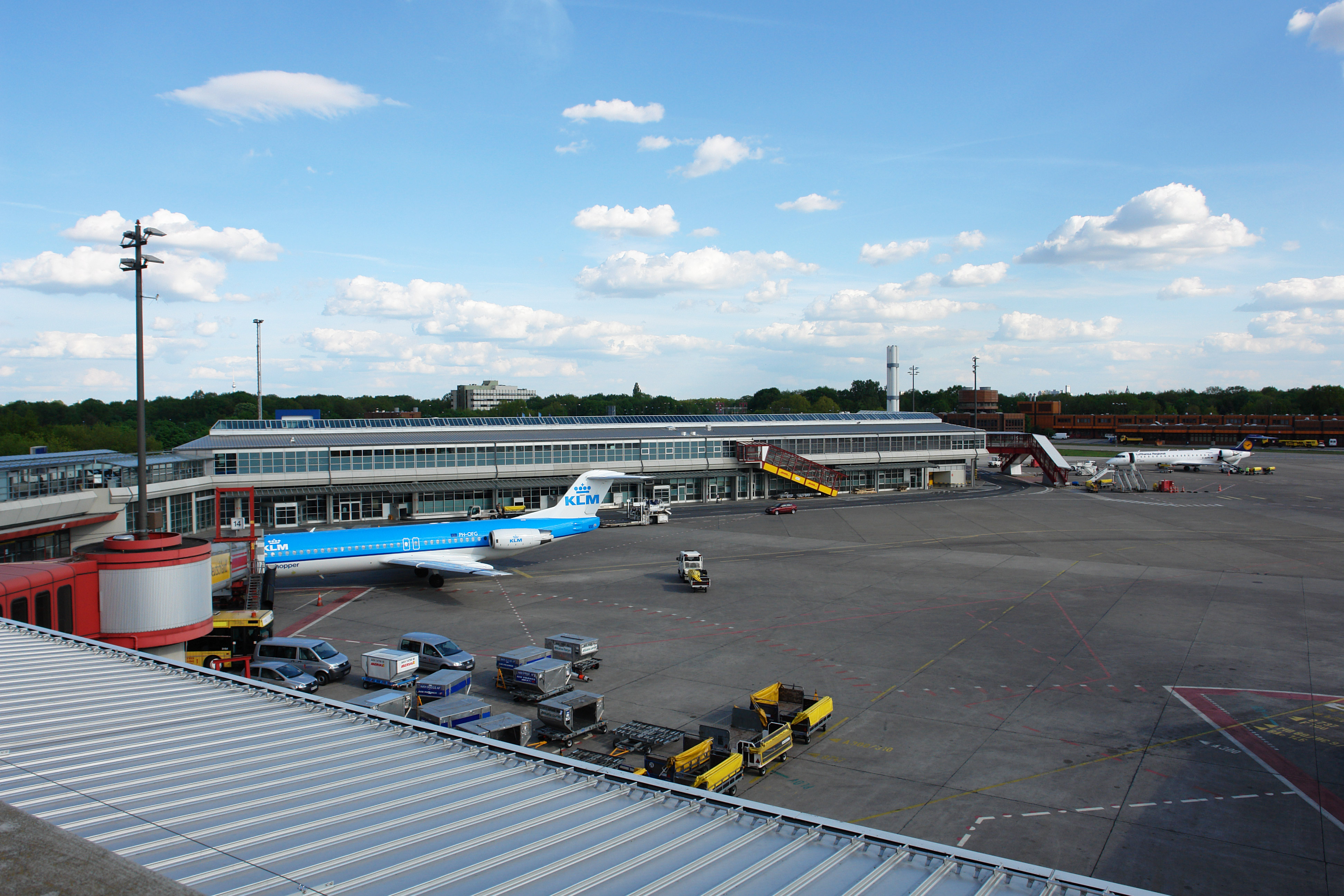
Apron of Terminal D

The events of the early post-reunification years (1990–1995) were followed by further, high-profile international route launches and growing consolidation among German airlines with a major presence at Tegel.

Amongst the former were the December 2005 launch of Tegel Airport's first-ever scheduled service to the Qatari capital Doha by Qatar Airways, operated non-stop at an initial frequency of four flights a week, and Air Berlin's November 2010 launch of non-stop, thrice-weekly Tegel–Dubai flights (another first). This was followed by the latter's May 2011 launch of a non-stop, four-times-a-week Tegel–JFK service.

The latter began with British Airways mid-2003 sale for a symbolic €1 (72p) of its German subsidiary DBA to Intro Verwaltungsgesellschaft, a Nuremberg-based consultancy and investment company headed by German entrepreneur Hans Rudolf Wöhrl who founded German charter airline Eurowings and also was a former DBA board member. Further consolidation among Tegel's German airlines took place when Air Berlin entered into an agreement to assume Germania's management shortly before the death of that airline's founder, took over DBA and gained control of LTU. These events occurred in November 2005, August 2006 and March 2007, respectively.

The airport was scheduled to close in June 2012 after Berlin Brandenburg Airport (BER) opened. Due to the delays with finishing construction of BER, the future of Tegel long remained uncertain.

A campaign was launched to keep Tegel Airport open, which gathered signatures for a referendum for voters to decide on the future of the airport. In September 2017, a public quorum was held parallel to the German federal election to decide whether Tegel Airport should remain open once Berlin Brandenburg Airport started its operations. The majority of voters voted in favour of Tegel remaining open; however, the federal authorities and the state of Brandenburg, which together hold a majority against Berlin over the airport's ownership, overrode the vote shortly afterwards, leading to the shutdown of Tegel.

On 9 October 2017, Air Berlin announced termination of all of its own operations, excluding wet leases, by the end of the month, leading to the loss of the airport's largest customer. On 28 October 2017, easyJet announced it would take over some of bankrupt Air Berlin's former assets at Tegel Airport to gradually start its own base operations there on 7 January 2018. Previously, it only served Berlin Schönefeld Airport, which was already an easyJet base.

As a consequence of the COVID-19 pandemic in Germany, passenger numbers at Tegel declined significantly. On 29 April 2020, airport management announced plans to close Tegel temporarily from 1 June 2020. However, shortly after this plan was cancelled with the airport remaining operational until early November 2020.

==== Closure and legacy of Tegel Airport ====
On 1 October 2020, the new airport received final approval for opening on 31 October 2020, meaning a closure of Tegel shortly after. In the days leading up to Tegel's closure, many airlines and their aircraft received water salutes before entering the runway for the last time. At this point, the tower and the main terminal were lit up in red with the #DankeTXL hashtag projected on them at night. The final scheduled flight to leave the airport was operated by Air France to Paris–Charles de Gaulle on 8 November 2020. Lufthansa concluded their Tegel operations on 7 November 2020 with the last scheduled flight to Munich, specially operated by an Airbus A350-900 to mark the occasion. Sundair also operated a special commemorative flight from Tegel to the new Berlin Brandenburg Airport using an Airbus A320 that still had the base colours of Air Berlin. Many former Air Berlin employees also came to the airport in their old Air Berlin uniforms.

For legal and safety reasons, Tegel was held operational for air traffic for another six months without handling any scheduled services before being decommissioned as an aviation facility. The separate, minor military area on the northern side of Tegel (Tegel Nord) was used for governmental helicopter flights until October 2025, when the helicopters were relocated to Berlin Brandenburg Airport.

The airport was decommissioned on 4 May 2021. At the same time, the first facilities, including interim terminal C2 and baggage halls have been already torn down while the main terminal, which will be kept, had been emptied of most facilities.

The airport terminal building was used as a COVID-19 vaccination centre during the coronavirus pandemic. In March 2022, the former airport was converted into temporary shelters for refugees fleeing Ukraine. Come June 2024, 4,000 of the 5,000 refugees and migrants housed at Tegel came from Ukraine, with the rest coming from nations including Turkey, Afghanistan, Iraq, Georgia and Vietnam. This housing was run by non-governmental organisations, including the German Red Cross.

== Terminals ==
Terminal layout as of 2010; the apron was subsequently extended to the southeast of Terminal C

Tegel consisted of five terminals. As the airport was small compared to other major airports handling the same number of passengers, these terminals might be regarded as "halls" or "boarding areas"; nevertheless, they are officially referred to as "terminals", even if most of them shared the same building.

Tegel Airport was originally planned to have a second hexagonal terminal like the main building right next to it. The second terminal ring was never built because of Berlin municipal budgetary constraints and the post-reunification decision to replace the former West Berlin airports with the new Berlin Brandenburg Airport.

=== Terminals A and B ===
The main building was the original part of the airport. It consisted of two parts:

- Terminal A was a hexagon-shaped ring concourse with a parking area, taxi stands and bus stops in its middle. It featured 14 jet bridges, which corresponded to 16 respective check-in counters (A00–A15), with jetways 1 and 14 each serving two check-in counters. There was no transit zone, which means that each gate has its own security clearance checkpoint and exit for arriving passengers. Therefore, direct flight connections without leaving the airside area were not possible. Most major airlines arrived and departed here, especially "prestigious" flights like intercontinental services or flights to the busy European hub airports; for example United Airlines flights to Newark and Lufthansa services to Munich and Frankfurt were handled here. The whole rooftop worked as a visitor platform. Terminal A was capable of handling wide-bodied aircraft up to the size of a Boeing 767-400ER or Airbus A330-300 on two positions but with only one jet bridge attached to each. The short distance from street to aircraft also put the airport at a disadvantage regarding its extra income as shops and restaurants were restricted to few and small spaces. The last flight from the airport, Air France flight AF1235, operated by an Airbus A320 (F-GKXP), departed from Terminal A, and its parking location is marked by a short gate centreline with a plaque-like sign beneath it: 08.11.2020 letzter Flug AF1235 TXL-CDG AIR FRANCE.
- Terminal B (also called "Nebel-Hall" after German spaceflight pioneer Rudolf Nebel) was a converted former waiting area in a side wing of the main building and featured check-in counters B20–B39. There was only one walk-boarding aircraft stand directly serving it. This single stand, however, could have handled widebody aircraft up to the size of the Boeing 777-300ER – operated into Tegel by Qatar Airways – and Boeing 747-400, which were not regular visitors.

=== Terminal C ===
Terminal C was opened in May 2007 as a temporary solution because all other terminals were operating at their maximum capacity. It was largely used by Air Berlin until its demise. It featured 26 check-in counters and gates numbered C38-C51, C60–C67 (Section C2), and C80-C89 (in the newest addition Section C3). From 2008 until August 2009, 5 additional aircraft stands were constructed and the building was expanded by approximately 50% of its original size, in order to handle another 1.5 million passengers per year. The extended terminal housed a transit zone for connecting passengers that did not exist at any other terminal at Tegel Airport. Due to noise protection treaties, the overall number of aircraft stands at the airport was restricted, thus aircraft stands on the apron (serving Terminals A and D) had to be removed for compensation. Terminal C was able to handle widebody-aircraft like Air Berlin's former Airbus A330-200s up to the size of a Boeing 747-400 but featured no jet bridges.

=== Terminal D ===
Terminal D was opened in 2001 and is a converted car park. It featured 22 check-in counters (D70–D91), with one bus-boarding gate and two walk-boarding gates. Most passengers of airlines operating smaller aircraft (like Embraer 190s for example) were brought to the remote aircraft stands by bus from here. Terminal D was the only part of the airport that remained open all night long. The lower level arrival area was called Terminal E (Gates E16-E18).

== Former airlines and destinations ==
Tegel was the primary airport of Berlin and therefore saw flights by most major European airlines including British Airways and Air France to many large European cities as well as frequent services to leisure routes mainly around the Mediterranean. After the demise of Air Berlin, which maintained a hub here, Tegel served as a base for easyJet and Ryanair — which both also operated out of Berlin Schönefeld Airport — alongside Eurowings. German flag carrier Lufthansa however only maintained two routes to connect their hubs in Frankfurt and Munich with several flights per day. Despite the size and importance of Berlin as one of Europe's largest capital cities, Tegel handled only eight long-haul routes prior to the COVID-19 pandemic, several of them seasonal — most notably by Qatar Airways to Doha, United Airlines to Newark and Scoot to Singapore.

== Statistics ==
=== Annual passenger traffic ===
Annual passenger traffic 2000–20
Year	Passengers	% change
2000	10,343,697	Steady
2001	9,909,453	▼ −4.2%
2002	9,879,888	▼ −0.3%
2003	11,104,106	▲12.4%
2004	11,047,954	▼ −0.1%
2005	11,532,302	▲4.3%
2006	11,812,623	▲2.4%
2007	13,357,741	▲13%
2008	14,486,610	▲8.4%
2009	14,180,237	▼ −2%
2010	15,025,600	▲6%
2011	16,919,820	▲12.6%
2012	18,164,203	▲7.3%
2013	19,591,838	▲8%
2014	20,688,016	▲5.6%
2015	21,005,215	▲1.5%
2016	21,253,959	▲1.1%
2017	20,455,278	▼ −3.7%
2018	22,000,430	▲7.5%
2019	24,227,570	▲10.1%
2020	9,097,788	▼ -74.48%

=== Busiest routes ===
Busiest domestic routes in 2019
Rank	Destination	All passengers	Operating airlines
1	Munich	1,972,901	easyJet, Lufthansa
2	Frankfurt	1,956,370	easyJet, Lufthansa
3	Cologne/Bonn	1,232,847	easyJet, Eurowings
4	Düsseldorf	1,144,793	easyJet, Eurowings
5	Stuttgart	1,037,326	easyJet, Eurowings

Busiest European routes in 2019
Rank	Destination	All passengers	Operating airlines
1	Zürich	980,950	easyJet, Swiss
2	Paris-Charles de Gaulle	867,378	easyJet, Joon
3	London-Heathrow	774,372	British Airways, Eurowings
4	Vienna	714,409	Austrian, easyJet
5	Amsterdam	590,625	KLM

Busiest continental routes in 2018 and 2019
Rank	Destination airport	Passengers 2019	% change	Passengers 2018	Departures 2019	% change	Departures 2018
1	Zürich	587,865	▲19.83%	490,600	5,261	▲42.69%	3.687
2	Vienna	461,391	▲30.09%	354,673	4,312	▲51.4%	2.848
3	Paris–Charles de Gaulle	420,056	▼ –1.78%	427,669	2,782	▼ –4.69%	2.919
4	Palma de Mallorca	407,039	▲74.18%	233,688	2,848	▲79.8%	1.584
5	London–Heathrow	401,583	▲4.48%	384,370	3,340	▲2.42%	3.261
6	Amsterdam	326,970	▲11.08%	294,354	2,388	▲11.75%	2.137
7	Istanbul	274,000	▲5.56%	259,565	1,579	▼ –5.22%	1.666
8	Helsinki-Vantaa	233,391	▼ –5.41%	246,730	1,819	▼ –5.36%	1.922
9	Madrid	173,562	▲53.38%	113,161	1,163	▲49.1%	780
10	Copenhagen	170,673	▼ –8.83%	187,210	1,498	▼ –2.73%	1.540
11	Brussels	165,961	▲4.11%	159,412	1,481	▼ –4.14%	1.545
12	Paris–Orly	160,250	▲781.12%	18,187	1,038	▲565.38%	156
13	Rome–Fiumicino	149,880	▲8.95%	137,567	1,080	▲7.57%	1.004
14	Stockholm–Arlanda	141,711	▼ –31.63%	207,278	1,133	▼ –31.21%	1.647
15	Antalya	120,783	▲21.6%	99,330	764	▲20.13%	636
16	London–Gatwick	86,077	new route	0	591	new route	0
17	Barcelona	83,355	▼ –7.77%	90,379	530	▼ –11.22%	597
18	Dublin	81,685	▲10.93%	73,634	611	▲4.98%	582
19	Lisbon	81,558	▲12.72%	72,357	614	▲10.43%	556
20	Milan–Malpensa	74,234	new route	0	488	new route	0
These statistics include departures only.

== Ground transportation ==
Tegel Airport did not have a direct rail connection, but was served by several bus routes and motorways. An underground station directly serving Tegel Airport had been planned since the 1960s, but was never built. Note that the Alt-Tegel U-Bahn station and Tegel S-Bahn station do not serve Tegel Airport, but rather the Tegel quarter of Berlin. Extensions of the tram system from Hauptbahnhof and the U6 branch from Kurt-Schumacher Platz to the airport were discussed, but not implemented before its closure.

=== Car ===
The airport has a direct connection to motorway A111 (Exit Flughafen Tegel), which further links it to motorways A10, A110 and A115 (via A110) reaching out in all directions. Taxis and car hire were available at the airport.

=== Bus ===
The airport was linked by several BVG bus lines, which offered connections to the U-Bahn and S-Bahn, as well as to Regional Express trains and long-distance trains:

- The TXL express bus ran to Beusselstraße S-Bahn station, Berlin Central station and initially further to Alexanderplatz (within 20 minutes), with frequent departures between 7 am and 10 pm.
- The X9 express bus ran to Jakob-Kaiser Platz U-Bahn station (within 5 minutes), Jungfernheide S-Bahn and Regional Express station, and Zoologischer Garten U-Bahn/S-Bahn/Regional Express station (within 20 minutes).
- The 109 bus ran to Jakob-Kaiser Platz U-Bahn station, Charlottenburg S-Bahn and Regional Express station (within 20 minutes), and Zoologischer Garten U-Bahn/S-Bahn/Regional Express station (within 30 minutes) (runs via Kurfürstendamm).
- The 128 bus ran to Kurt-Schumacher-Platz U-Bahn station (within 10 minutes) and Osloer Straße U-Bahn station (within 25 minutes).

Tegel Airport was in the Verkehrsverbund Berlin-Brandenburg's Berlin B fare zone, with no additional fare for BVG services to and from the airport.

== Incidents and accidents ==
There are no recorded fatal accidents involving commercial airline operations at Berlin Tegel itself. However, two commercial flights, one of which was due to arrive at Tegel Airport and the other of which had departed the airport, were involved in fatal accidents. These accidents are listed below:

- On 15 November 1966, Clipper München, a Pan Am Boeing 727-21 (registration N317PA) operating the return leg of the airline's daily cargo flight to Berlin from Frankfurt Rhein-Main Airport (flight number PA 708) was due to land that night at Tegel Airport, rather than Tempelhof, due to runway resurfacing work taking place at that time at the latter. Berlin Control had cleared flight 708 for an Instrument Landing System (ILS) approach to Tegel Airport's runway 08, soon after the crew had begun its descent from Flight Level (FL) 090 to FL 030 before entering the southwest air corridor over East Germany on the last stretch of its journey to Berlin. The aircraft impacted the ground near Dallgow, East Germany, almost immediately after the crew had acknowledged further instructions received from Berlin Control, just 10 mi (16 km) from Tegel Airport. All three crew members died in this accident. Visibility was poor, and it was snowing at the time of the accident. Following the accident, the Soviet military authorities in East Germany returned only half of the aircraft's wreckage to their US counterparts in West Berlin. This excluded vital parts, such as the flight data recorder (FDR), the cockpit voice recorder (CVR) as well as the plane's flight control systems, its navigation and communication equipment. The subsequent National Transportation Safety Board (NTSB) investigation report concluded that the aircraft's descent below its altitude clearance limit was the accident's probable cause. However, the NTSB was unable to establish the factors that had caused the crew to descend below its cleared minimum altitude.

The following notable, non-fatal incidents involving airline operations occurred at Tegel. These include commercial flights that were about to depart or had actually departed/arrived as well as unscheduled stopovers:

- Between 1969 and 1982, Berlin Tegel was the destination of several aircraft hijackings involving LOT Polish Airlines domestic flights within Poland. The hijackings were a means of forcing the authorities in communist Poland to let the hijackers emigrate from the Eastern Bloc. Once the aircraft had landed at Tegel, the French military authorities in charge of the airport during the Cold War era let the hijackers and anyone else who did not wish to return to Poland disembark and claim political asylum in West Berlin. The aircraft, its crew and those passengers who did not want to disembark were subsequently returned to Poland.
- Upon completing the repair and run-up of the faulty engine that had caused a rejected takeoff due to an engine oil warning at Berlin Tegel during the late 1980s, a Dan-Air Boeing 727-200 Adv collided with a jetway at the airport's terminal building while maintenance engineers taxied the aircraft back to its stand. This badly injured the ground crew member manning the jetway and ruptured the fully refuelled aircraft's centre wing tank at the left wing root. As a result, a large quantity of jet fuel spilled onto the tarmac. The maintenance engineers' failure to pressurise the aircraft's hydraulics had resulted in a complete loss of hydraulic pressure just before reaching the stand, making it impossible to steer the aircraft and rendering the brakes ineffective.
- On 7 January 1997, Austrian Airlines flight 104, a McDonnell Douglas MD-87 en route to Vienna International Airport, was hijacked shortly after takeoff from Tegel Airport by a Bosnian male carrying a knife (which was small enough to be allowed on board under then valid safety regulations). The pilots were forced to return to Berlin, where the perpetrator was overpowered by German police forces.
- On 6 November 1997, an Air France Boeing 737-500 skidded off the runway while landing at Berlin Tegel due to a suspected brake defect. There were no injuries.

There were also two Cold war era incidents relating to an American and a British airliner that had departed Tegel on international non-scheduled passenger services. Both of these occurred in Bulgarian airspace. The former was a charter flight carrying German holidaymakers to the Bulgarian Black Sea coast, the latter a migrant charter en route to Turkey:

- On 28 May 1971, a Modern Air CV-990A with 45 passengers on board en route from Berlin Tegel to Bulgaria was unexpectedly denied permission to enter Bulgarian airspace, as a result of a new policy adopted by that country's then-communist government to deny any aircraft whose flight had originated or was going to terminate at a West Berlin airport the right to take off and land at any of its airports. This resulted in the aircraft having to turn back to Berlin, where it landed safely at the city's Tegel Airport.
- The same year, a Dan-Air Comet carrying Turkish migrant workers from Berlin Tegel to Istanbul was "escorted" by Bulgarian fighter planes into Sofia. The crew flying the aircraft was attempting to take the shortest route to Istanbul when leaving Yugoslav airspace by entering Bulgarian airspace, instead of taking the longer route through Greek airspace. They were not aware of the then communist government of Bulgaria's decision not to let any aircraft enter its airspace whose flight had originated or was going to terminate at a West Berlin airport, without stopping en route at another airport outside West Berlin. The aircraft landed safely at Sofia. It was released along with its crew and passengers when the flight's commander paid with the company's credit card the fine the Bulgarian authorities had imposed for violating their country's airspace.

== See also ==
- Berlin Brandenburg Airport
- Berlin Schönefeld Airport
- Berlin Tempelhof Airport
- Otto Lilienthal, the aviator after whom the airport is named
- Flughafensee
- List of airports in Germany
- Transport in Germany
