= Pan Am Flight 708 =

1966 aviation accident

Coordinates: 52.5°N 13.04°E

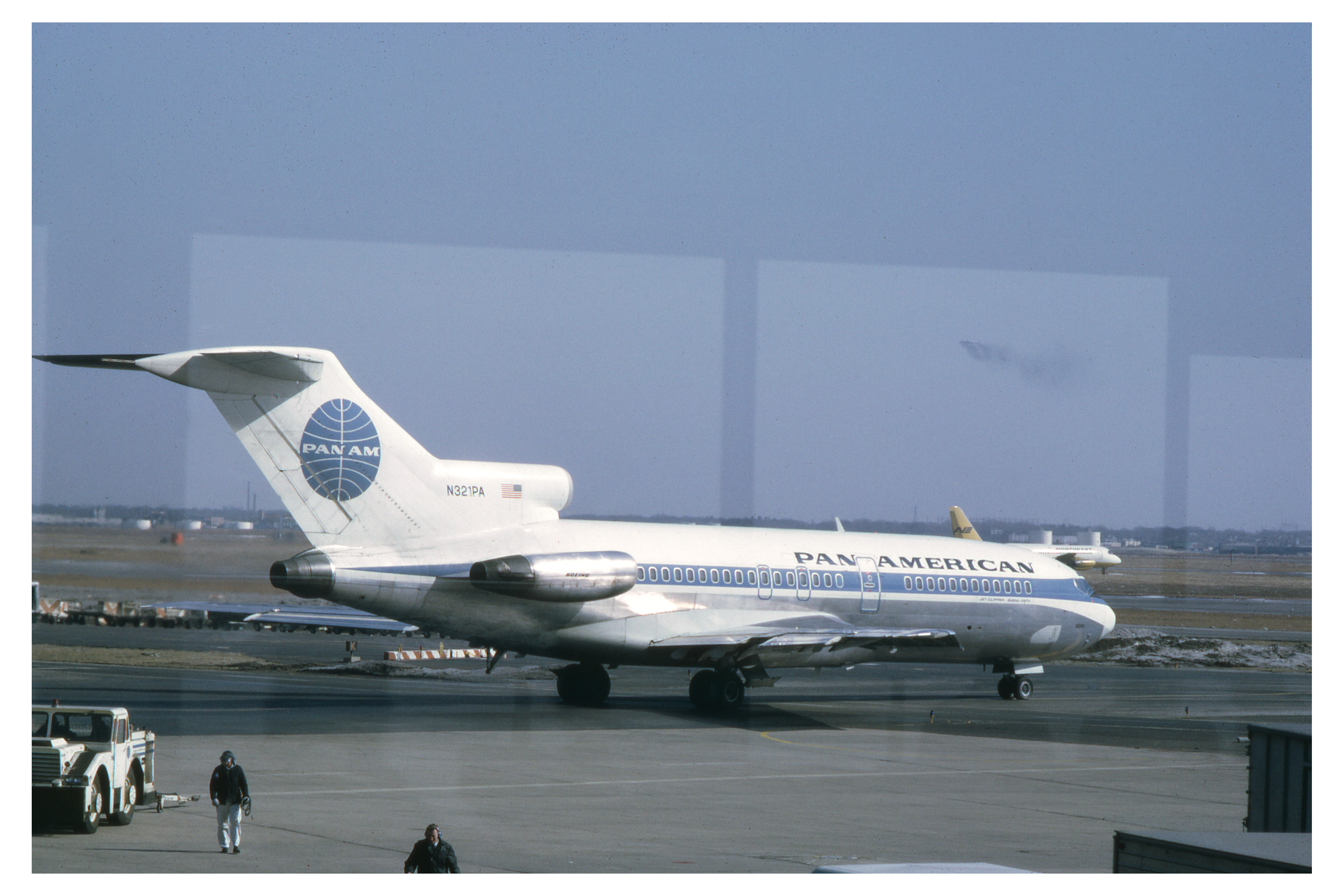
- A Pan Am Boeing 727-21 similar to the one involved. This aircraft would later crash as Avianca Flight 410

Occurrence
- Date: November 15, 1966
- Summary: Controlled flight into terrain; cause unknown
- Site: Near Dallgow-Döberitz, Germany

Aircraft
- Aircraft type: Boeing 727-21
- Aircraft name: Clipper München
- Operator: Pan American World Airways
- Call sign: CLIPPER 708
- Registration: N317PA
- Flight origin: Frankfurt Airport, Frankfurt, West Germany
- Destination: Berlin Tegel Airport, Berlin, British Sector
- Occupants: 3
- Passengers: 0
- Crew: 3
- Fatalities: 3
- Survivors: 0

Pan Am Flight 708 (PA 708) was a cargo flight that crashed on initial approach less than 10 mi (16 km) west-southwest of its destination airport, Berlin Tegel in Germany, in the early morning hours of November 15, 1966. The flight was operated by a Pan American World Airways (Pan Am) Boeing 727-21, registration N317PA, name Clipper München, routing from Frankfurt Airport. All three crew members perished. The cause was undetermined because US investigators were not allowed to survey the impact site at a Soviet military training ground near Dallgow in what was then East Germany, and only half of the aircraft remains were returned by Soviet military authorities in East Germany to their US counterparts in former West Berlin.

== Flight details ==
Flight 708 usually landed at Tempelhof Airport. But because of runway maintenance at Tempelhof, Pan Am shifted its flights to Tegel Airport. At the time of the accident, weather was poor and it was snowing.

The Soviet authorities returned about 50% of the wreckage. Some major components were not returned, including the flight data and cockpit voice recorders, flight control systems, navigation and communication equipment.

At the time of the crash, the Soviet Union did not belong to the International Civil Aviation Organization (ICAO). Nations belonging to ICAO allow reciprocal visits by official observers in order to improve aviation safety.
