= Jungfernheide =

Forest and heathland area in Charlottenburg-Nord, Berlin, Germany

Coordinates: 52°32′38″N 13°17′27″E

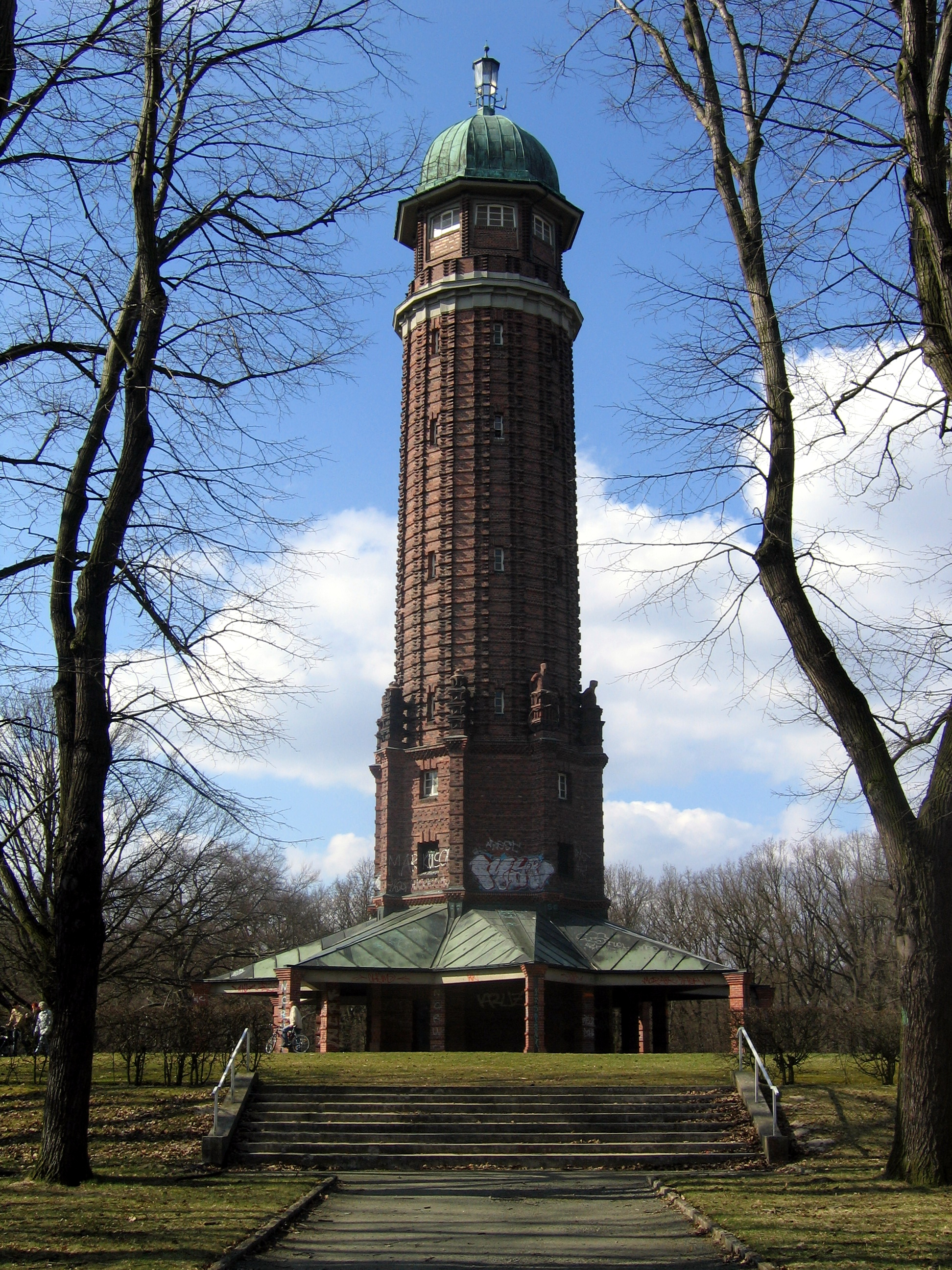
Water tower in Volkspark Jungfernheide

Jungfernheide (German pronunciation: [ˌjʊŋfɐnˈhaɪ̯də]) is an area of forest and heathland located in Berlin in the present-day district of Charlottenburg-Nord, a locality of the borough of Charlottenburg-Wilmersdorf. Formerly a large forested area, it was progressively reduced in size through development and military use. The recently closed Tegel Airport now divides the remainder, with Volkspark Jungfernheide (Jungfernheidepark) to the south, and a larger still-forested region between the airport and Lake Tegel.

With the creation of Greater Berlin in 1920, Charlottenburg was joined with the former districts of Heerstraße and Jungfernheide to become the seventh district of Berlin.

== Name ==
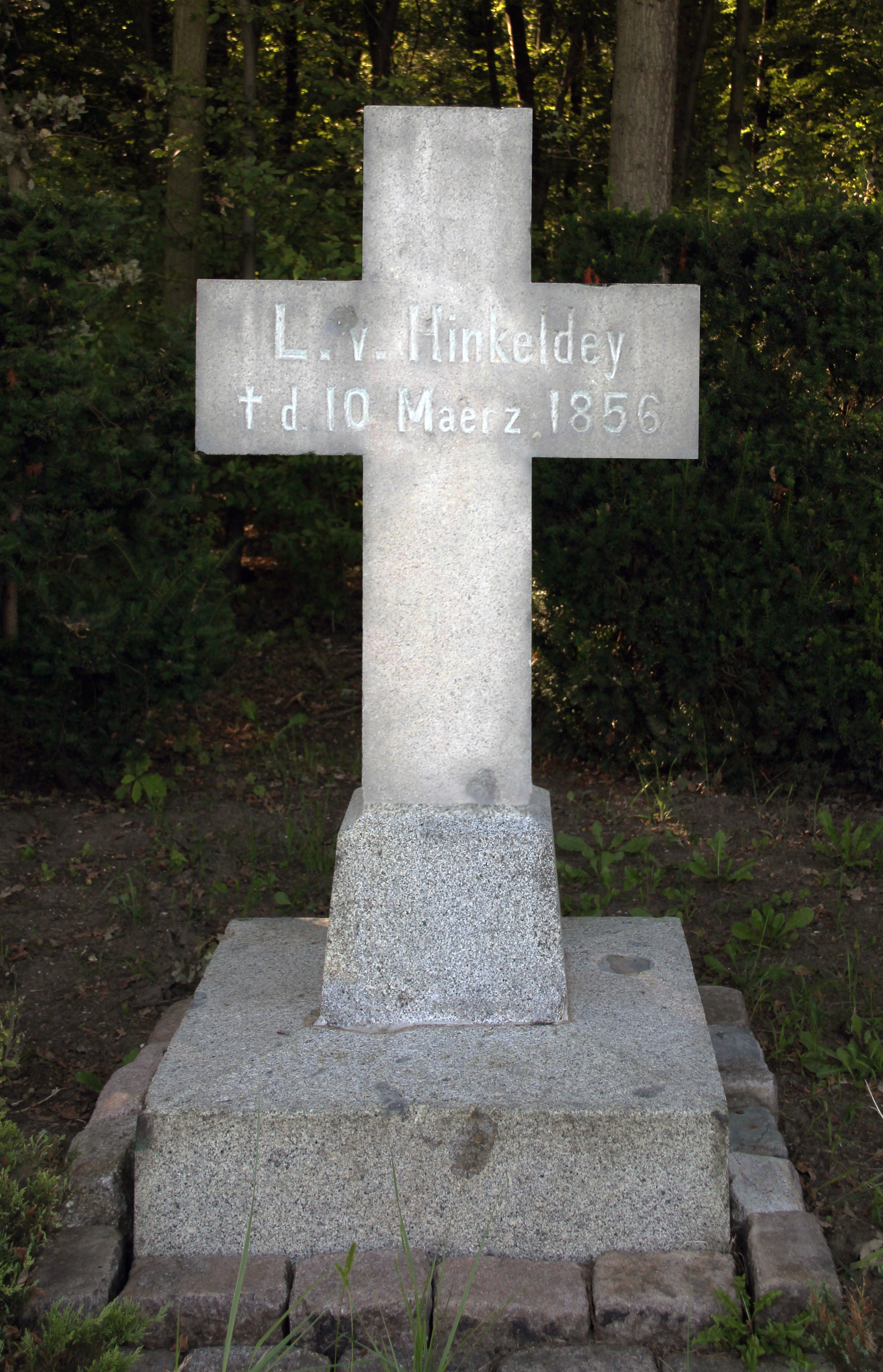
Memorial to Karl Ludwig Friedrich von Hinckeldey in the Volkspark Jungfernheide

The name of the area is a combination of the word Heide, meaning heath, and Jungfer, meaning "Young noblewoman" or "damsel" (cf. Junker), from the Benedictine convent that existed in Spandau from 1269 until the 16th century and owned the area. The street Nonnendamm also relates to the nuns of Spandau.

== History ==
=== Forest and hunting grounds ===
The forest and heathland located east of Spandau were used as a royal hunting ground until 1800. In 1823, the forest areas of Charlottenburg and Tegel were designated as an estate (Gutsbezirk).

=== Military use ===
Beginning in 1824, the Jungfernheide was used for military drills and shooting grounds. In 1828, the Reinickendorf artillery grounds were relocated here by Frederick William III of Prussia. Barracks were constructed between 1896 and 1901 for the airshipmen battalion Luftschiffer-Bataillon Berlin-Jungfernheide.

=== Transit connections ===
The railway station Berlin Jungfernheide station was opened in 1877. In this year, the western section of the Berlin Ringbahn was also completed, which was primarily built for military purposes. S-train service between Jungfernheide and the Berlin Sonnenallee station stopped from 1980 until 1997 due in part to the Berlin Wall. Since reopening, Jungfernheide has served as an important junction in the northwest of Berlin, offering transfers between the Ringbahn, the U7 (Berlin U-Bahn), regional trains, local and express buses to the nearby Tegel Airport. Tegel Airport was built after World War II in the heathland of the Jungfernheide.

=== Water supply ===
In 1896, the Jungfernheide waterworks were opened, providing drinking water from Lake Tegel. The plant has been mothballed since 2001.

== Jungfernheidepark ==
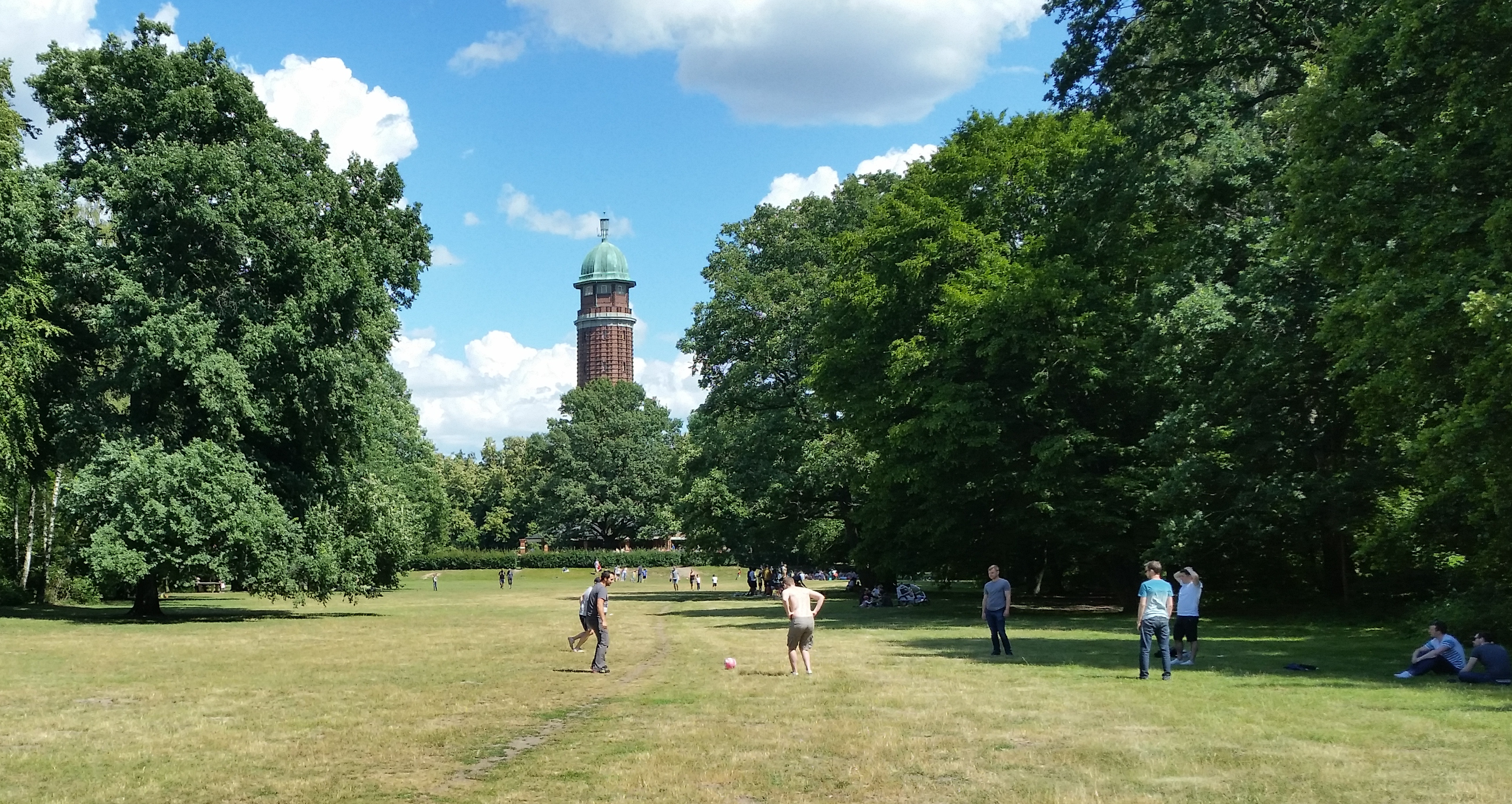
Volkspark Jungfernheide with view of the water tower

The Volkspark Jungfernheide is located on 146 hectares (360 acres) of land between the Berlin-Spandau Ship Canal and the Heckerdamm, and is bounded to the West by the Jungfernheideweg and to the East by Bundesautobahn 111.
