= Bundesautobahn 103 =

Federal motorway in Germany

Coordinates: 52°27′56″N 13°20′09″E

A 103
- Bundesautobahn 103

Route information
- Length: 5 km (3.1 mi)

Major junctions
- North end: B 1/A 100 in Berlin
- South end: B 1 in Berlin

Location
- Country: Germany
- States: Berlin

Highway system
- Roads in Germany; Autobahns; List; Federal; List; State; E-roads
| ← A 100 | → A 111 |

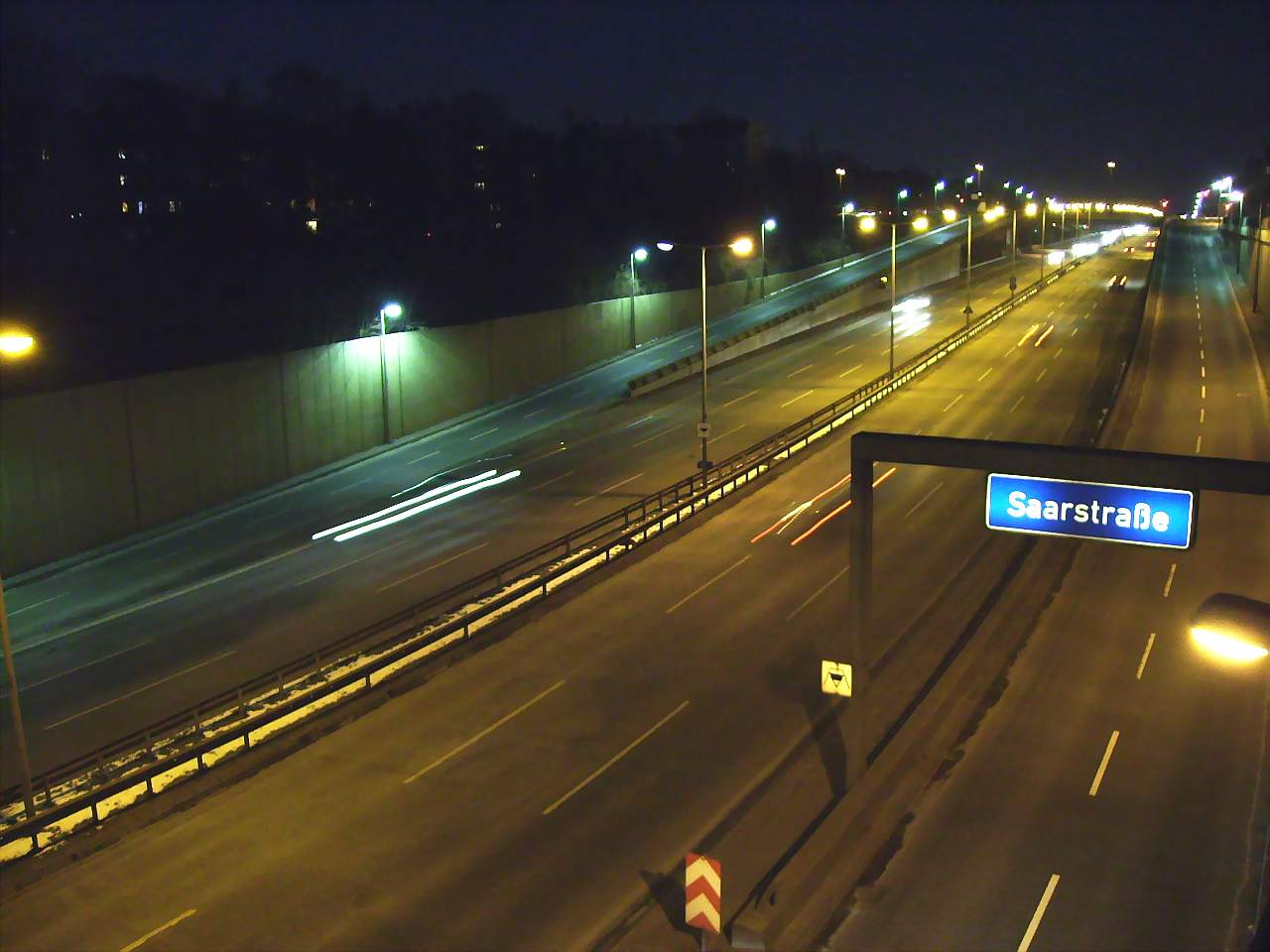
A103 near Saarstrasse exit

Bundesautobahn 103 (translates from German as Federal Motorway 103, short form Autobahn 103, abbreviated as BAB 103 or A 103) is a short urban Autobahn in Western Berlin, Germany connecting to the A 100. Before reunification, it was called the A 13.

== Exit list ==
| | (1) | Sachsendamm B 1 |
| | (2) | Schöneberg 4-way interchange A 100 |
| | (2) | Grazer Damm |
| | (3) | Saarstraße |
| | | Tunnel Feuerbachstraße 260 m |
| | (4) | Filandastraße |
| | | Hochstraße 140 m |
| End of the motorway | | End of the motorway |
B 1
