= Euroberlin France =

Airline of France and Germany (1988–1994)

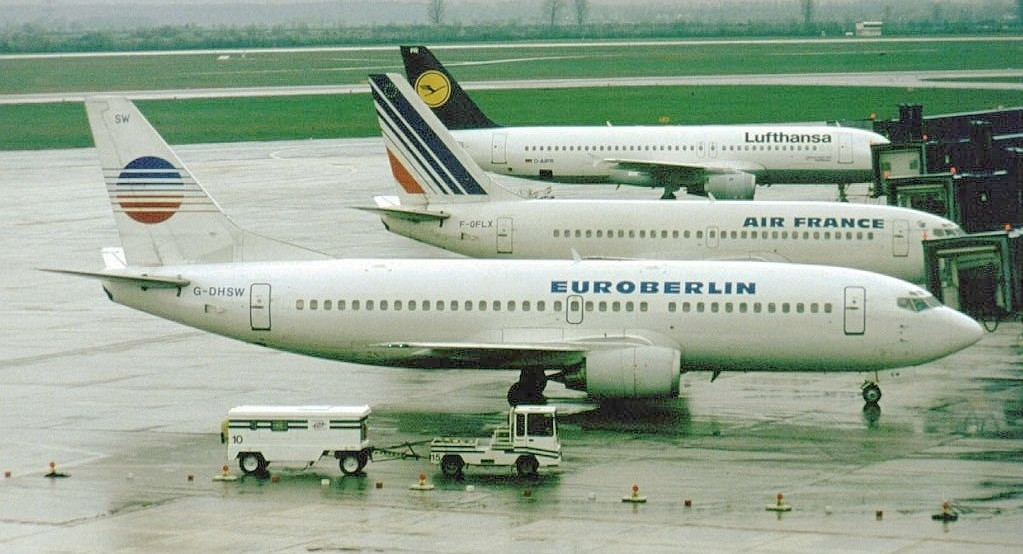
- Boeing 737-300 next to two similar aircraft of the parent airlines
IATA	ICAO	Call sign
EE	EEB	EUROBER
- Commenced operations: 7 November 1988
- Ceased operations: December 1994
- Hubs: Berlin Tegel Airport
- Parent company: Air France (51%); Lufthansa (49%)
- Headquarters: Paris, France

Euroberlin France was a Franco-German joint venture airline founded in 1988.

== Overview ==
It was jointly owned by Air France and Lufthansa, owning 51% and 49% stakes respectively. Euroberlin France's corporate headquarters was located in Paris, France while Berlin Tegel Airport in what used to be West Berlin in the days prior to Germany's reunification was its operational headquarters.

The airline commenced commercial operations from Tegel Airport at the start of the 1988-'89 winter timetable with a fleet of four Boeing 737-300 jet aircraft leased from Monarch Airlines. Monarch Airlines supplied all of Euroberlin's flightdeck crew, while Monarch's sister company Monarch Aircraft Engineering provided the maintenance support for the Euroberlin operation at Tegel, under a wet lease agreement. Air France staff at the French flag carrier's Paris headquarters performed all of Euroberlin's administrative functions. As a result of these arrangements, most employees on Euroberlin's payroll were flight attendants. (Groundhandling at Tegel Airport and the other stations served was outsourced to a third party handling agent as well.)

German reunification in October 1990 resulted in Air France and Lufthansa adjusting their stakes in Euroberlin so that each airline owned exactly 50% of its share capital. This in turn resulted in the "France" suffix being dropped from the airline's name.

Euroberlin was dissolved at the end of 1994.

== History ==
Several years of successive declines and stagnation of scheduled internal German air traffic from and to West Berlin during the 1970s and early 1980s were followed by renewed expansion in this market from the mid-1980s.

During the prolonged period of decline/stagnation, Pan Am and British Airways, the two dominant scheduled carriers in the internal German air transport market from and to West Berlin, had significantly reduced the number of flight frequencies, while replacing competitive with collaborative schedules on most of the routes served from Berlin. This had led to a widely perceived fall in service standards and choice of airlines/air services on individual routes, as well as widespread criticism from West Berlin's city government and its business community.

Air France, West Berlin's third scheduled carrier, had withdrawn entirely from the internal German market as long ago as 1969, reducing its presence at the city's Tegel Airport to providing a single daily non-stop scheduled service from/to Paris Orly only. (This move was designed to staunch the growing losses Air France's internal German routes from/to Tegel had incurred ever since Pan Am had introduced jet equipment on its own internal German services from/to Tempelhof in 1966. Over the following two years, the airline's share of the total West Berlin — West Germany air travel market collapsed from 9% to less than 5%. Following the beginning of BEA's jet operations from Tempelhof in late 1968, Air France's share dropped even further. Other factors that contributed to the company's progressive decline in traffic on its internal German services included Tegel's greater distance from West Berlin's city centre compared with Tempelhof, the lack of a motorway connecting the airport to the city centre and poor public transport links. Compared with its two bigger rivals in the Berlin market, it served fewer German domestic routes at lower frequencies and did not promote these as effectively. To keep a presence in the internal German air transport market from/to West Berlin, Air France had entered into a collaborative agreement with BEA. This agreement covered the Berlin–Frankfurt and Berlin–Munich routes. The agreement's intention was to enable both BEA and Air France to compete better with Pan Am's more frequent services on these routes by pooling their resources. It entailed the joint operation of these routes from Tempelhof with BEA BAC One-Eleven 500 aircraft, BEA flightdeck crews and mixed BEA/Air France cabin crews. However, BEA's claim that it returned to profitability on both its Frankfurt and Munich routes from Berlin as a result of the collaborative agreement with Air France was contradicted by the latter's counter claim that it was still losing money on these routes, in spite of that agreement. This in turn led to the agreement's termination as of November 1, 1972. The same day, Air France introduced a second daily return flight between Orly and Tegel, which routed via Cologne in both directions to maintain the airline's internal German traffic rights from/to Berlin. From April 1, 1974, Air France routed both of its daily Orly–Tegel services via Cologne, and from November 1, 1974, it switched them to the French capital's then new Charles de Gaulle Airport. At the start of the 1976 summer timetable, Air France introduced a third daily CDG–Tegel frequency, which routed via Düsseldorf and utilised the Boeing 727-200, a bigger aircraft than the Caravelles used on the company's other services from/to Berlin. Air France subsequently routed all of its CDG–Tegel flights via Düsseldorf and standardised the aircraft equipment on the 727-200/200 Advanced.)

The perceived lack of genuine competition in a growing market coincided with continuing criticism of the ailing Pan Am's internal German operation. This, as well as the desire to establish a bridgehead in Europe in anticipation of European air transport liberalisation, resulted in US majors American Airlines, Continental Airlines, Delta Air Lines, Northwest Airlines and TWA expressing an interest in breaking the long-standing Pan Am/BA internal German duopoly in West Berlin. Four of these airlines then proceeded to apply to the US FAA as well as to West Berlin's Allied Air Attachés to be licensed to begin operating scheduled internal German services from West Berlin. This in turn provided the impetus for Air France and Lufthansa to secure a share of this expanding and potentially lucrative market for themselves.

The only way for Air France and Lufthansa to compete successfully in this market was by way of establishing a subsidiary with substantially lower operating costs than those of the incumbent airlines.

In addition, both airlines needed to find a way that would legalise Lufthansa's provision of commercial air services from/to West Berlin to comply with post-World War II Allied rules that restricted such services to the airlines of the three Western victorious powers of World War II only. Both airlines therefore decided to establish Euroberlin France as a jointly owned operating company in which Air France became the controlling shareholder. This was achieved by Air France taking a 51% majority stake (as opposed to Lufthansa's 49% minority stake), thereby making Euroberlin a French legal entity and enabling it to conduct commercial airline operations in West Berlin.

To make the newly formed airline cost-competitive with incumbents Pan Am and British Airways, Luton-based UK independent Monarch Airlines and its sister company Monarch Aircraft Engineering were contracted to provide all aircraft and flightdeck crew as well as the aircraft's maintenance support under a wet lease arrangement. Furthermore, all functions other than employing and managing local flight attendants as well as the operational management of the airline were outsourced.

Operations commenced on November 7, 1988 with four Boeing 737-300s leased from Monarch. These inaugurated high-frequency shuttle services from Berlin Tegel to Cologne/Bonn, Frankfurt, Munich and Stuttgart.

Euroberlin's livery incorporated elements of both Air France's and Lufthansa's contemporary liveries using the former's corporate colours (red and blue on a white background).

From the start of the 1989 summer timetable, a fifth 737-300 was leased from Monarch to increase week day frequencies on the existing four routes as well as to launch two additional routes serving Düsseldorf and Hamburg respectively from Euroberlin's Tegel base. From then on, Euroberlin also entered the short- to medium-haul charter market from West Berlin to help it maintain a high aircraft utilisation at week-ends when frequencies on its scheduled route network were reduced.

By 1990 Euroberlin's fleet had expanded to seven Boeing 737-300s. This firmly established it as the third-largest contemporary airline operator at Berlin Tegel, a position previously held by UK independent Dan-Air Services. (Dan-Air had established a base at Berlin Tegel in 1969 and was the airport's third-largest operator during the decade from 1978 until 1988.)

During the 1990/91 winter season, Euroberlin leased a further three 737-300s, two of which were previously operated by Aéromaritime.

Euroberlin quickly made a name for itself in the Berlin air transport market and acquired a loyal customer following as a result of its high-quality in-flight service, which was modelled on Air France's contemporary, short-haul European in-flight service. This, as well as its low cost base, helped make the airline profitable within a relatively short period of time, with an average scheduled load factor of 60%.

Following German [re-]unification on October 3, 1990, Air France reduced its stake in Euroberlin by 1%, while Lufthansa increased its stake by the same amount. This resulted in both airlines becoming equal owners of Euroberlin. It also resulted in Euroberlin dropping the "France" suffix from its name, including its physical removal from the aircraft's fuselage titles.

German [re-]unification moreover changed Euroberlin's strategic role for Lufthansa in the Berlin market. Henceforth, the German flag carrier subcontracted Euroberlin to operate some of its internal German services from Berlin Tegel for a limited period, during which it gradually replaced Euroberlin's aircraft and employees with its own planes and staff. This was part of Lufthansa's contemporary corporate strategy to re-establish its presence in Berlin as quickly as possible after a politically enforced absence of 45 years. As a consequence of Lufthansa's new strategy for the Berlin market, Euroberlin's aircraft fleet and employee strength gradually diminished.

Euroberlin was finally shut down in December 1994, resulting in the return of its remaining three 737-300s to Monarch Airlines.

== Fleet ==
Euroberlin operated a single aircraft type fleet built around the Boeing 737-300 throughout its entire existence. All aircraft operated were subleased from Monarch Airlines, which in turn had leased the aircraft from external lessors. From the start of the 1989 summer season, a fifth Boeing 737-300 was leased from Monarch Airlines.

By 1990, the Euroberlin fleet comprised seven Boeing 737-300s, all of which were leased from Monarch. Euroberlin's fleet eventually grew to a total of ten aircraft, following the introduction of an additional three 737-300s during the 1990/'91 winter season.
