= Bundesautobahn 111 =

Federal motorway in Germany

A 111
- Bundesautobahn 111

Route information
- Length: 17 km (11 mi)
- Existed: 1975–present

Major junctions
- North end: A 10 in Velten
- South end: A 100 in Berlin

Location
- Country: Germany
- States: Berlin

Highway system
- Roads in Germany; Autobahns; List; Federal; List; State; E-roads
← A 103	→ A 113

Bundesautobahn 111 (translates from German as Federal Motorway 111, short form Autobahn 111, abbreviated as BAB 111 or A 111) is an autobahn in Germany. It connects the Berliner Stadtring (A 100) with the Berliner Ring (A 10). Before reunification, it was called the A 11. The A 111 was used from 31 December 1987 to German reunification in 1990 for transit traffic through the GDR to Hamburg and Malmö (Sweden) with the border crossing Heiligensee / Stolpe. From 1975 until reunification, the highway was designated as A 11. As part of the numbering of motorways after 1990 in East Germany then the new number A 111 was assigned.

== Tunnel Tegel Airport ==
The tunnel Tegel Airport Berlin, shorter tunnel Tegel Airport (TFT), was taken in 1979 in the course of the construction of the A 111 in operation. The length of the tunnel tube east (north direction) is 967 m, the tunnel tube west (south direction) extends over a length of 878 m. The two separate tunnels were built in an open construction in a pit with groundwater lowering and then covered, so that the runway of the airport is located above. The outer wall thicknesses are 80 cm, the middle wall was designed with a thickness of 60 cm. The base plate has a control plate thickness of 1.20 m. The thickness of the ceiling slab is on average one meter. The inside width within the two tunnel tubes is approx. 10.50 m, the clear height was designed with 5.50 m and with extensions at a minimum of 4.81 m. Due to tightened safety guidelines for road tunnels (including 2004/54 / EC of 29 April 2004) and the tunnel leakages investigated in the 1990s, a basic overhaul was planned beginning 18 November 2006 for 18 months a full closure was carried out.

Due to the structural condition is expected from the year 2021 a thorough renovation of the Berlin section of the A 111 required. In addition to the renewal of the carriageway, this also includes the refurbishment of the Tunnel Beyschlagsiedlung, Tegel Forest Office and Tegel town center as well as the replacement of the discontinued bridges in this section of the route. DEGES was commissioned to plan and carry out the construction work.

== Exit list ==
(1)	Oranienburg 4-way interchange A 10 B 96
(2a)	Hennigsdorf
	Oder-Havel-Kanal-Brücke 150 m
(2b)	Stolpe
	Services Stolper Heide
(3)	Schulzendorfer Straße
	Tunnel Beyschlagtunnel 500 m
	Tunnel Forsthaustunnel 250 m
(4)	Waidmannsluster Damm/Hermsdorfer Damm
	Tunnel Tegel 753 m/755 m
	Tunnel Ernststraße 154 m/152 m
(5)	Holzhauser Straße
(6)	Seidelstraße
(7)	Kurt-Schumacher-Platz 3-way interchange A 111 (ast)
(8)	Eichborndamm
	Tunnel Flughafen Tegel 934 m/967 m
(9)	Kurt-Schumacher-Damm
	Hinckeldeybrücke 150 m
(10)	Saatwinkler Damm
(11)	Flughafen Tegel
(12)	Heckerdamm
(13)	Charlottenburg 3-way interchange A 100
