= Lübars =

- Quarter of Berlin
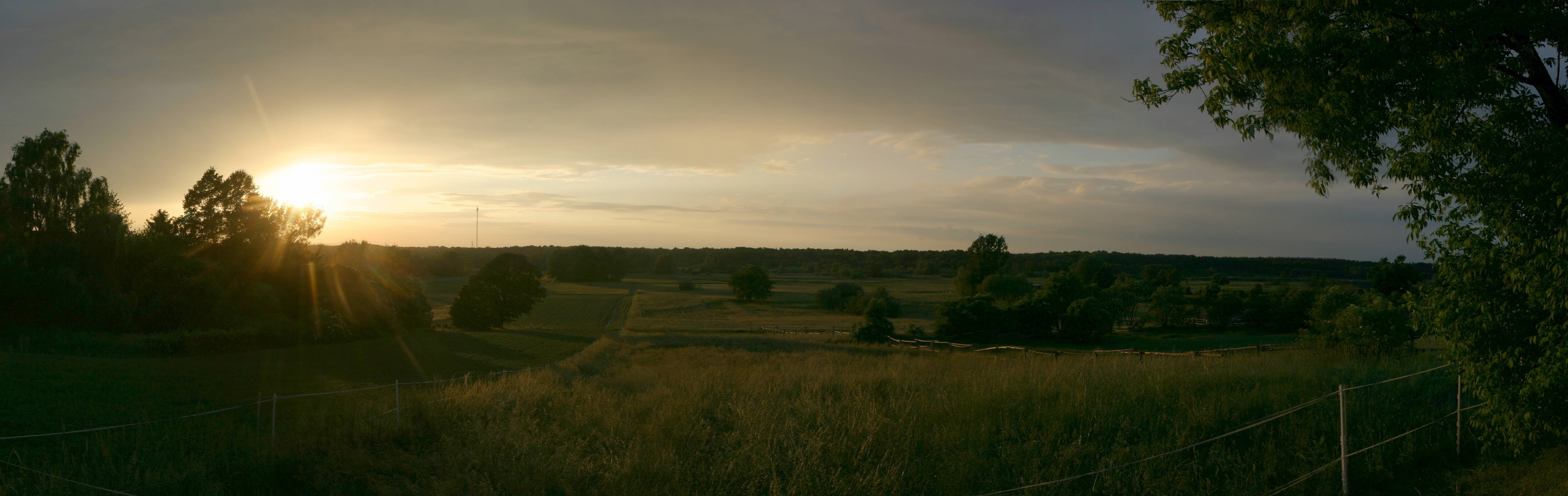
- Panoramic view with Tegeler Creek

- Location of Lübars in Reinickendorf district and Berlin
- Interactive map of Lübars
- Location within Germany Location within Berlin
- Coordinates: 52°37′00″N 13°22′00″E
- Country: Germany
- State: Berlin
- City: Berlin
- Borough: Reinickendorf
- Founded: 1247
- Subdivisions: 3 zones

Area
  - Total: 5 km^{2} (1.9 sq mi)
- Elevation: 60 m (200 ft)

Population (2024-12-31)
  - Total: 5,104
  - Density: 1,000/km^{2} (2,600/sq mi)
- Time zone: UTC+01:00 (CET)
  - Summer (DST): UTC+02:00 (CEST)
- Postal codes: 13469
- Vehicle registration: B

Lübars (German pronunciation: [ˈlyːbaʁs]) is a German locality (Ortsteil) within the borough (Bezirk) of Reinickendorf, Berlin.

== History ==
First mentioned in 1247, it was an autonomous municipality merged into Berlin in 1920 with the "Greater Berlin Act". As a part of West Berlin bordering East Germany, Lübars was crossed, from 1961 to 1989, by the Berlin Wall, built beyond the Tegeler Creek (Tegeler Fließ). Famous was the "Checkpoint Qualitz", a point of the wall named after Helmut Qualitz, a farmer from Lübars, who broke it on 16 June 1990 with his tractor.

== Geography ==
=== Overview ===
Situated in the north of Berlin and partially included in the area of Barnim Nature Park, Lübars includes the small lakes of Ziegeleisee, Klötzbecken and part of Hermsdorfer See. The Tegeler Fließ separates Lübars from the Brandenburger municipalities, both in the Oberhavel district, of Glienicke/Nordbahn and Mühlenbecker Land (with its municipal seat of Schildow). The Berliner bordering localities are Hermsdorf, Waidmannslust, Wittenau, Märkisches Viertel, Blankenfelde and Rosenthal (both in the Pankow district). Lübars' principal recreation park is the eponymous one, situated in its southwestern corner.

=== Subdivision ===
Lübars counts 3 zones (Ortslagen):

- AEG-Siedlung
- Andreas-Rabe-Siedlung
- Kienwerder

== Transport ==
The locality is not served by rail; only its southern borders with Märkisches Viertel are crossed by the industrial railway Tegel-Friedrichsfelde. Bus line 222 serves the locality.

== Photogallery ==
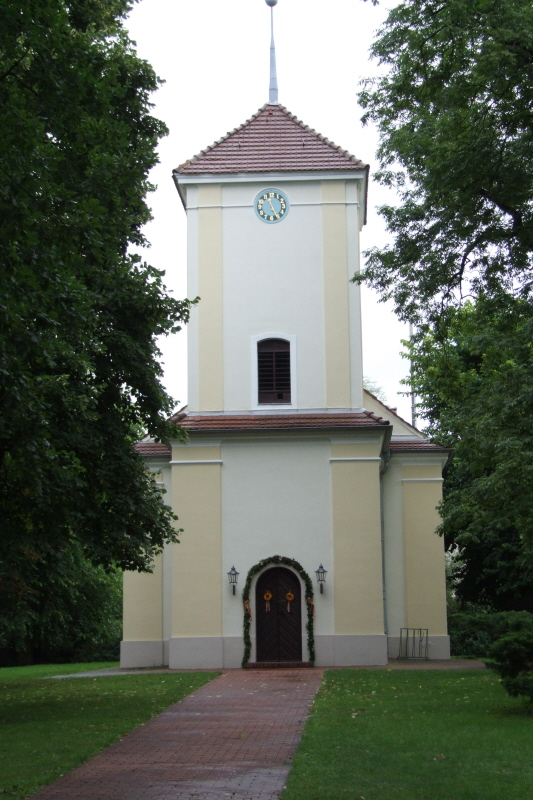
Village church

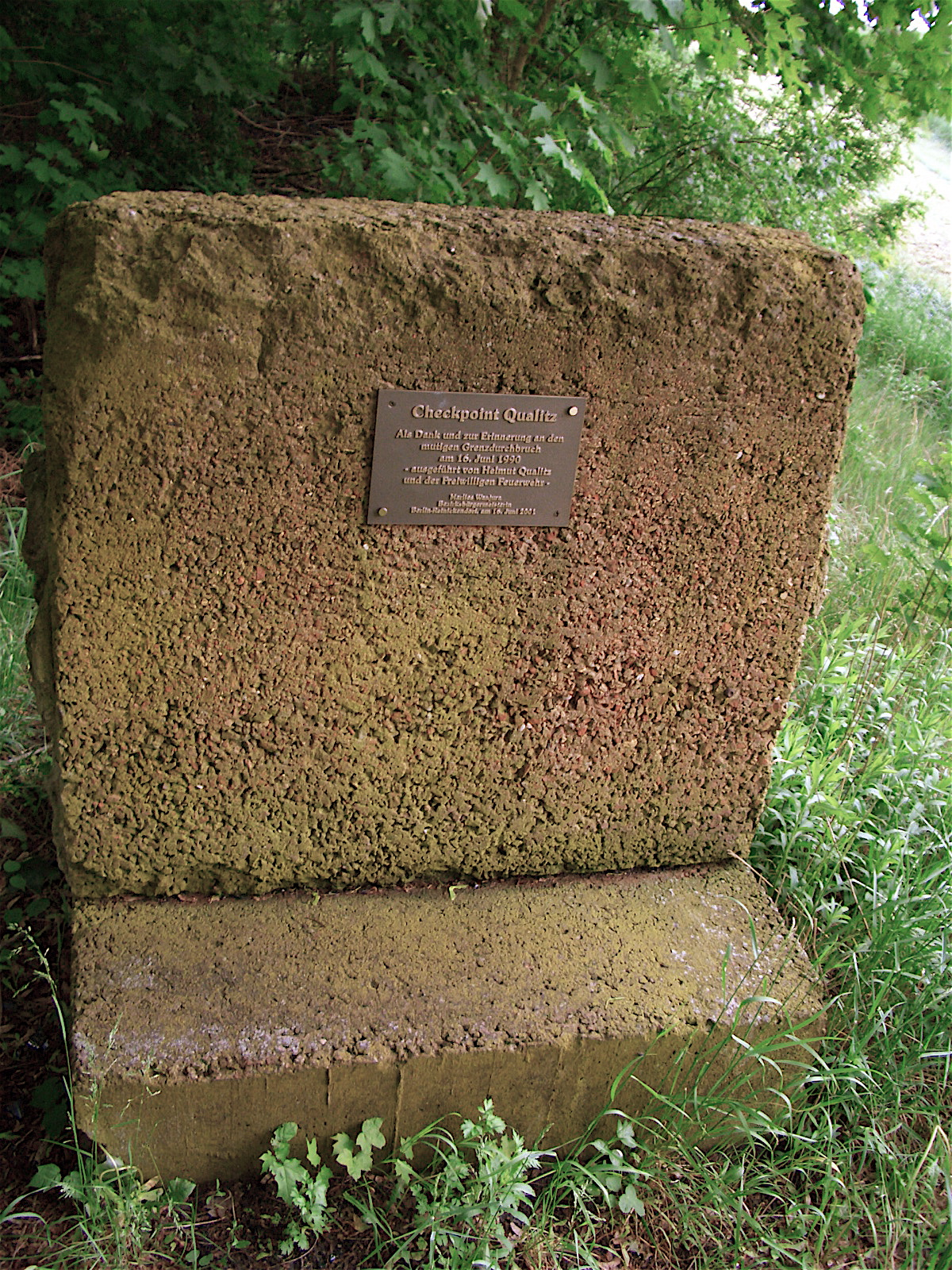
Memorial plaque at "Checkpoint Qualitz"

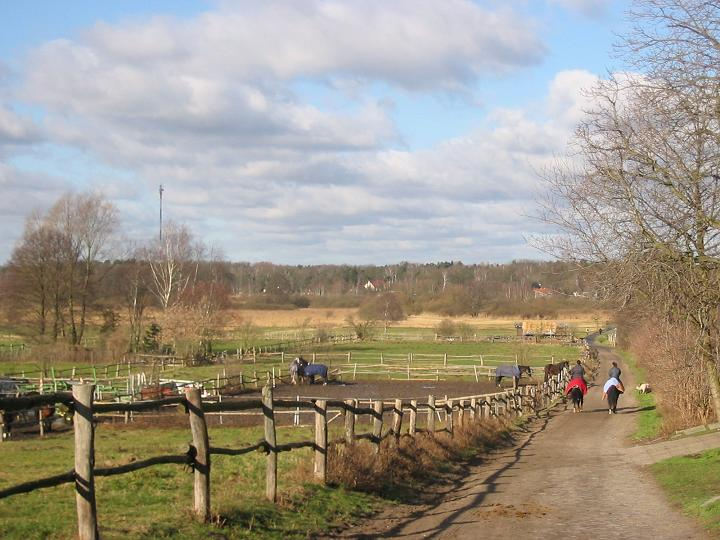
Tegeler Fließ valley

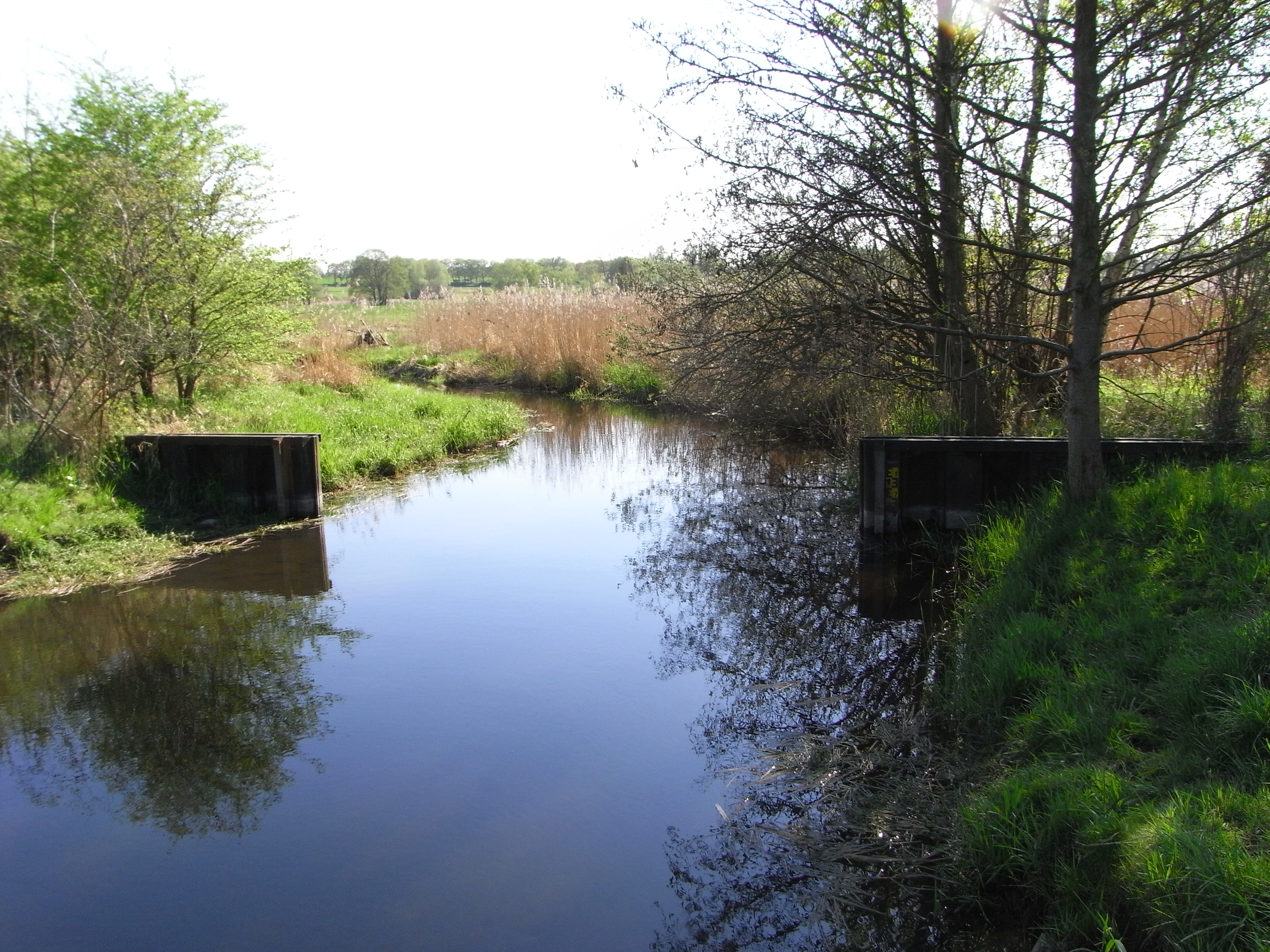
Tegeler Fließ with relics of the former GDR border barriers

== Literature ==
- W. Ribbe, J. Schmädeke: "Kleine Berlin-Geschichte", Stapp Verlag, Berlin 1994, ISBN 3-87776-222-0
