= Wittenau =

- Quarter of Berlin
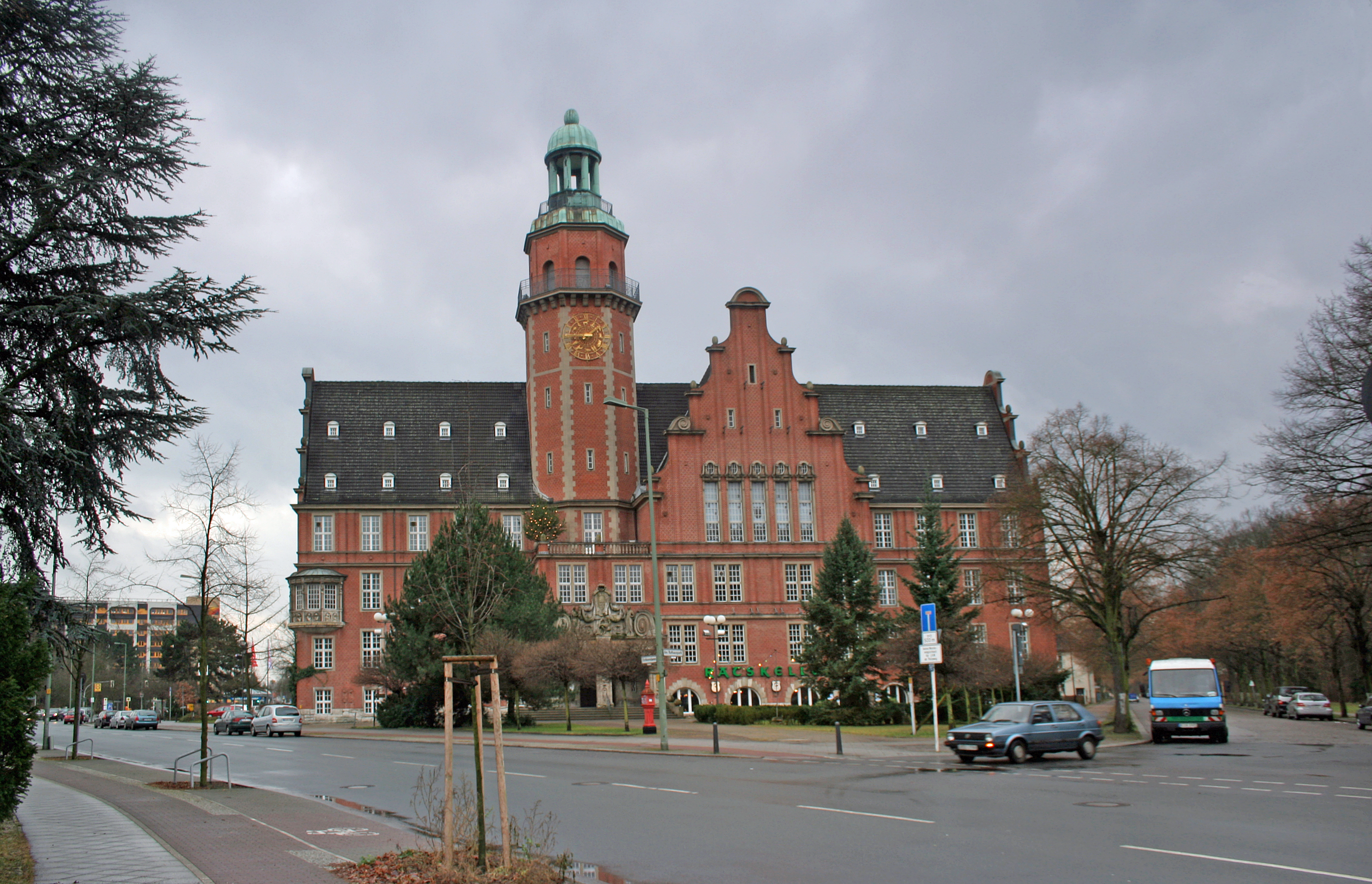
- Reinickendorf town hall

- Coat of arms

- Location of Wittenau in Reinickendorf district and Berlin
- Interactive map of Wittenau
- Location within Germany Location within Berlin
- Coordinates: 52°36′00″N 13°20′00″E
- Country: Germany
- State: Berlin
- City: Berlin
- Borough: Reinickendorf
- Founded: 1322
- Subdivisions: 1 zone

Area
  - Total: 5.9 km^{2} (2.3 sq mi)
- Elevation: 50 m (160 ft)

Population (2024-12-31)
  - Total: 25,239
  - Density: 4,300/km^{2} (11,000/sq mi)
- Time zone: UTC+01:00 (CET)
  - Summer (DST): UTC+02:00 (CEST)
- Postal codes: 13435, 13437, 13439, 13469
- Vehicle registration: B

Wittenau (German pronunciation: [vɪtəˈnaʊ̯]) is a German locality (Ortsteil) within the borough (Bezirk) of Reinickendorf, Berlin.

== History ==
Originally named Dalldorf it was first mentioned in 1332. In 1869 the city of Berlin had acquired land in the Dalldorf in order to build the Städtische Irrenanstalt zu Dalldorf (Municipal Mental Asylum at Dalldorf), today's Karl-Bonhoeffer-Nervenklinik (Karl Bonhoeffer mental home), between 1877 and 1879. In the following years Dalldorf became the synonym for 'madhouse' in Berlin parlance. Therefore, in 1903 Dalldorf applied at the Niederbarnim district commissioner for a new toponym, Wittenau after its late mayor Peter Witte, granted by the Prussian government with effect of 23 August 1905. In 1920 Wittenau merged into Berlin by the Greater Berlin Act.

After the capture of the district by the Red Army was relatively quickly formed again a provisional local government. This was because small groups of anti-fascists found themselves ready to take over the administration in coordination with the occupiers. In Wittenau Anton Jadasch was appointed mayor. Immediately after the end of the fighting in Berlin, the Soviet occupying power began with the dismantling of undamaged industrial plants and their facilities. The temporary British occupying power did not continue this. However, with the arrival of the French Allies as final occupying power, the dismantling began again. These continue until the signing of the Petersberg Agreement on 22 November 1949. Nevertheless, some companies were able to produce different products again as early as November 1945, the former armaments factories in Wittenau mainly produced household goods and products needed for reconstruction (the Mauserwerke, for example, potato hoes and bread loaves, the former German weapons and munitions factories now made ovens and building hardware ago). However, the industry in Wittenau, which had just regained momentum, was suddenly slowed down by the Berlin blockade in the years 1948/1949. Numerous companies temporarily stopped production, especially craft enterprises only resumed work several months after the blockade ended. The political reconstruction progressed faster: already in September 1950, the foundation stone was laid for the cultivation at the town hall Reinickendorf. Only for the period after 1953 is a noticeable growth of industrial production demonstrable. Many companies were able to expand their production at this time (e.g. Waggon Union, ZF Friedrichshafen), others were just in this time in the district (e.g. Collonil). Not only industrial enterprises settled in Wittenau, also the largest of the residential complexes for the members of the French armed forces – the Cité Foch – originated here since 1953. Several blocks of flats along the Cyclopstraße later followed numerous residential, administrative and supply buildings northeast of the demolished today Wittenau freight yard on the border with Waidmannslust. The location on the edge of the district and the fact that the French representatives resided in Waidmannslust (see: Former residence of the High Commissioner of the French Republic for Germany), still today lead to the fact that the Cité Foch is falsely counted among Waidmannslust. Even the Federal Real Estate Agency, which manages the area today, makes that mistake.

The construction of the Berlin Wall in 1961 also had far-reaching consequences for the Wittenau economy. As in the entire district of Reinickendorf, the number of small businesses declined and work was increasingly carried out in companies with more than ten employees. Furthermore, the public administration with the construction of the tax office Reinickendorf in 1976 once again centralized. This constellation required – as well as the low cultural offer – an efficient infrastructure. As early as 1958, the then subway line C (today: Line U6) had been extended to Tegel, whereby at least Borsigwalde was affected by the subway. As part of the S-Bahn boycott in West Berlin Wittenau was increasingly dependent on the Berlin subway, buses and private transport. The complete suspension of train operations on the Kremmener Bahn and the Nordbahn in January 1984 exacerbated this situation even further. The eastern part of Wittenau already had a well developed north–south connection for private transport with the federal highway 96. In addition, in the 1970s with the construction of the A 111 – a feeder for the Berlin city highway and the Berlin Ring – began, the complete completion lasted until 1987. With the junction Holzhauser road West Wittenau was a direct connection to the city center. In the 1970s and 1980s not only Wittenau was invested in the transport infrastructure, but also in public buildings: In 1971, the construction of the Ringelnatz elementary school in Wilhelm-Gericke-Straße was completed, followed only a year later, the Peter Witte primary school in the town hall promenade. After the completion of the tax office Reinickendorf in 1976 and Eichborndamm followed in 1978, the school Am Park east of the Volkspark Wittenau. Finally, the new building for two upper grades centers was opened in 1983 in the Cyclopstraße, which are now run under the name Emil Fischer School and Ernst Litfaß School. In 1985, the new building of the Humboldt Hospital was opened on a site on the northern ditch.

With the fall of the Berlin Wall and the subsequent reunification, favorable building land was available north of Berlin. This and a coordinated economic promotion in the district of Oberhavel led in the following years increasingly to the exodus of young families and industrial companies to the northern outskirts of Berlin. In September 1994 Wittenau was connected to the U8 line of the Berlin subway, after already in 1992 the Northern Railway drove back to Oranienburg.

It was not until 1995 that operations on the Kremmener Bahn were resumed, meaning that Wittenau has been fully connected to the two historic north–south routes since this time. The partial migration of the Wittenauer industry caused a structural change in the district to a mixture of commercial and residential. In 1994, in the immediate vicinity of the Trift Park with the construction of a housing estate started, which is known today because of its facade color as Blue Settlement – analogous to the Yellow Settlement on the other side of the Trift Park, the terraced houses were completed in 1988. In addition, two terraced housing estates were built in the 1990s, but these two new construction measures were accompanied by various inconsistencies and corresponding protests. Originally on the park-like grounds Am Spießweg a replacement for the previously demolished retirement home should arise, this plan was never realized, instead, there is a terraced housing since 1999. Concluded, however, were the plans for the area of the former allotment colony "New Home", after various eviction since March 1996, could finally be laid in December 1996, the foundation stone for a row house and two-storey row buildings. Without protest, however, was the departure of the French from the Cité Foch, which were subsequently rehabilitated. The apartments there were managed and marketed in the course of the move of the Federal Government to Berlin by the Federal Agency for Real Estate Tasks; they should be made available mainly to federal officials with their families. In 1994, the Romain-Rolland-Gymnasium was founded here in the former rooms of the French elementary school École Victor Hugo, a high school with a French focus. In the late 1990s, the Cité Foch experienced a short-lived recovery, especially through the opening of a famila department store in the old shopping center. In July 2001 famila was taken over by Kaufland in Berlin, in February 2006 the branch in the Cité Foch was closed, the near Kaufland branch on Eichhorster Weg still exists. As was feared at the time, the settlement continued to desolate, in 2011 also closed the last grocery store.

Wittenau's former neighbourhood Märkisches Viertel was elevated to locality status in 1999. Until 24 April 2012 Borsigwalde, now also a locality of its own, was part of Wittenau. Also Wittenau was the outbreak zone known as "Verrückt" in Call Of Duty: World At War

== Geography ==
=== Overview ===
Situated in the north-western suburb of Berlin, not too far from the forest and the lake of Tegel, it borders with the localities of Waidmannslust, Lübars, Märkisches Viertel, Reinickendorf, Borsigwalde and Tegel. Its eastern corner, in Schorfheidestrasse, is close to Wilhelmsruh, in Pankow district.

=== Subdivision ===
The locality is subdivided into 1 zone (Ortslage):

- Cité Foch

== Transport ==
Wittenau is flanked on its southwestern and its eastern district boundary of each route of the S-Bahn. A subway line connects these two routes and thus connects the historic core of the district to the Berlin subway. Traffic junction is the station Wittenau, from which numerous bus lines depart to the neighboring districts. The line 124 connects in east–west direction the districts Tegel and Märkisches Viertel, in north–south direction, the lines 120 connects the Wedding with Frohnau. Wittenau is connected to Charlottenburg-Nord via the M21 metro bus line and the parallel express bus X21. Even in subordinate roads some lines run, but these have rather feeder functions.

For motorized private transport Wittenau is connected to the federal highway 96, the federal highway 111 runs about one kilometer west. In addition, exist with the Eichborn dam and the southern Oranienburger Straße two more main roads to the south, the streets Am Nordgraben, Gorkistraße and Alt-Wittenau run through the district in an east–west direction. The major roads mentioned have predominantly road-side cycle paths, but in large parts they are in need of major refurbishment. Cobblestone is only present in a few minor roads; most of the roads are covered with a closed surface. In most public green areas separate bicycle paths are indicated. Especially in the vicinity of these facilities, many paths are reserved exclusively for pedestrians and serve as a connection between two roads. At the exit no. 5, it is named "Holzhauser Straße".
