= Waidmannslust =

- Quarter of Berlin
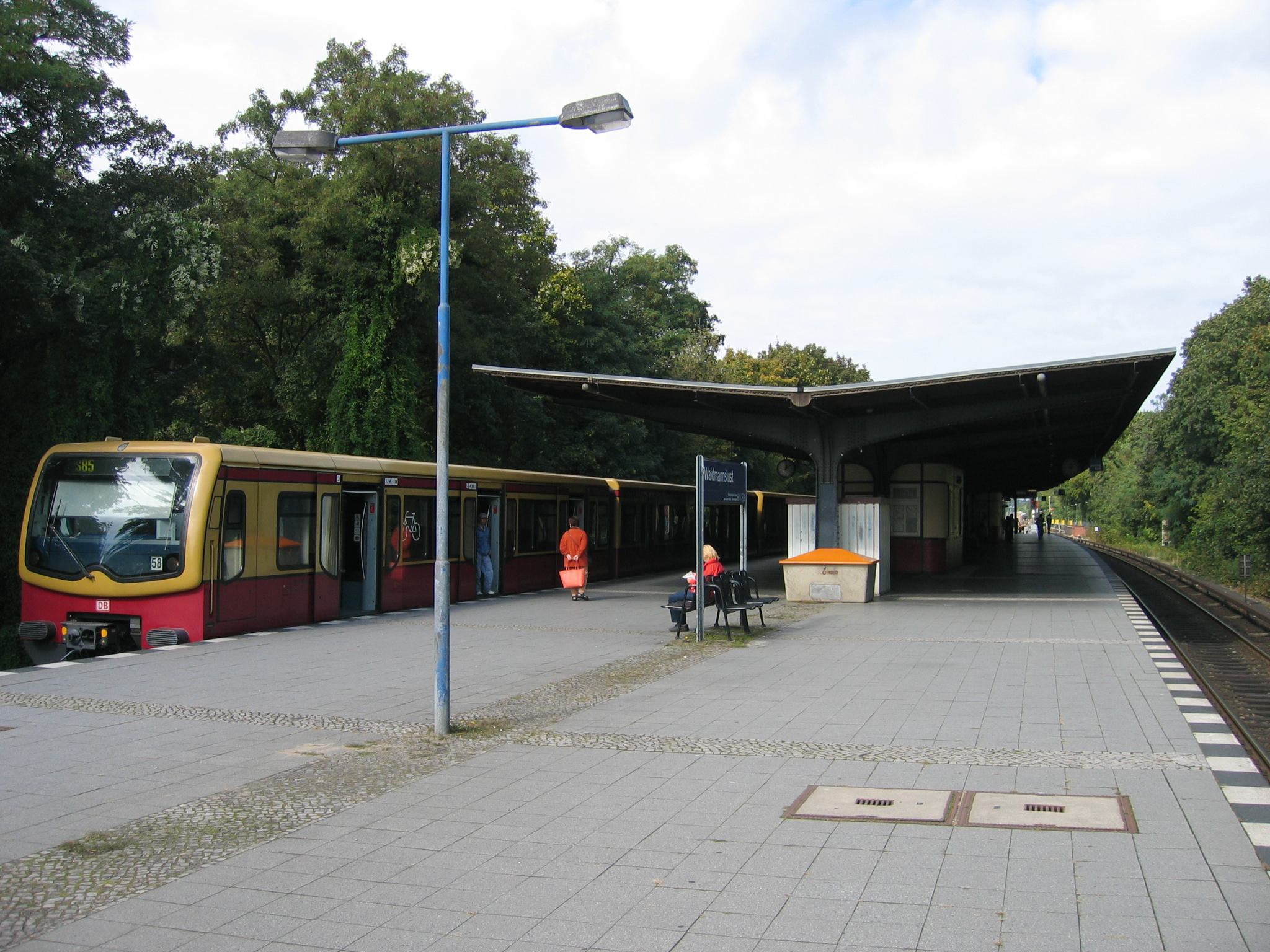
- The railway station

- Location of Waidmannslust in Reinickendorf district and Berlin
- Interactive map of Waidmannslust
- Location within Germany Location within Berlin
- Coordinates: 52°36′24″N 13°19′15″E
- Country: Germany
- State: Berlin
- City: Berlin
- Borough: Reinickendorf
- Founded: 1875
- Subdivisions: 2 zones

Area
  - Total: 2.3 km^{2} (0.89 sq mi)
- Elevation: 52 m (171 ft)

Population (2024-12-31)
  - Total: 11,408
  - Density: 5,000/km^{2} (13,000/sq mi)
- Time zone: UTC+01:00 (CET)
  - Summer (DST): UTC+02:00 (CEST)
- Postal codes: 13469
- Vehicle registration: B
- Website: www.waidmannslust.info

Waidmannslust (German pronunciation: [ˈvaɪtmansˌlʊst]) is a German locality (Ortsteil) within the borough (Bezirk) of Reinickendorf, Berlin.

== History ==
The locality was created in 1875 as a Villenkolonie. In 1920 it merged in the city of Berlin with the Greater Berlin Act. During 1949–1990 it was part of the French sector of West Berlin.

== Geography ==
=== Overview ===
Situated in the north-western suburb of Berlin, not too far from Tegel's forest and lake, it borders the localities of Hermsdorf, Lübars, Wittenau and Tegel.

=== Subdivision ===
The locality is subdivided into 2 zones (Ortslagen):

- Schwarzwald-Siedlung (Rollberge Siedlung)

== Transport ==
The locality is served by S-Bahn, at Berlin Waidmannslust station, on S1, S26 and S85 lines.

It is also served by A 111 motorway, at the exit n.4, named "Waidmannsluster Damm/Hermsdorfer Damm".

== Personalities ==
- Elga Brink (1905–1985), actress
- Marlies Wanjura (b. 1945), former mayor of Reinickendorf borough

== Literature ==
- Klaus Schlickeiser: "Waidmannslust, Vom Wirtshaus zum Ortsteil Reinickendorfs" - Berlin 2000, ISBN 3-927611-15-8
- Manfred Mendes: "Leben in Waidmannslust, Geschichten, Episoden, Berichte, Bilder" - Mendes Eigenverlag, Berlin 2004
