= Gamp =

Gamp is a colloquial, primarily British, dated or obsolete term for an umbrella, after the Dickens character Sarah Gamp.

GAMP may refer to:

- Girard Academic Music Program, a magnet secondary school in Philadelphia, Pennsylvania
- Good automated manufacturing practice, a set of guidelines in the pharmaceutical industry
- Grupa Arhitekata Modernog Pravca, a Serbian architects group
- General Artificial Matrix Producer (GAMP), a plot element in the backstory of the game Xevious
  - GAMP appears as the main antagonist of Shadow Labyinth
- Richard Gamp (born 2003), German politician
