= Lindwerder =

Lindwerder (German pronunciation: [lɪntˈvɛʁdɐ]) may refer to several places in Germany:

- Lindwerder (Jenssen), an Anhalter civil parish of the town of Jessen
- Lindwerder (Nikolassee), a Berliner islet on the river Havel
- Lindwerder (Tegel), a Berliner islet on Lake Tegel
