= Berlin-Tegel =

Berlin-Tegel may refer to:

- Berlin-Tegel Airport
- Tegel - locaility in Berlin, Germany
