= Richard Gamp =

German politician (born 2003)

- Gamp in 2026

Member of the Berlin House of Representatives
- Assuming office 29 October 2026
- Succeeding: Frank Balzer
- Constituency: Reinickendorf 6

Personal details
- Born: 2003 (age 22–23)
- Party: Christian Democratic Union (since 2019)

Richard Friedrich Gamp (born 2003) is a German politician who was elected member of the Berlin House of Representatives in 2026. He has served as chairman of the Christian Democratic Union in Borsigwalde since 2025, and as chairman of the Young Union in Reinickendorf since 2021. In 2020, he served as chairman of the Landesschülerausschuss Berlin.
