= Borsigwalde =

- Quarter of Berlin
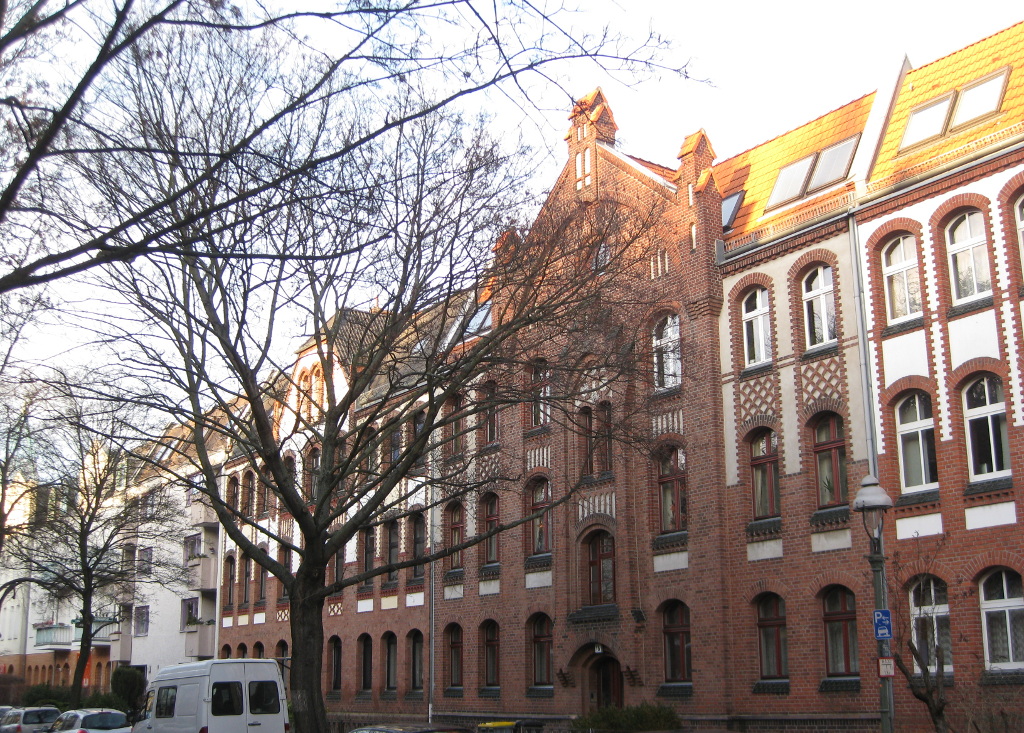
- Historical facades along Räuschstraße

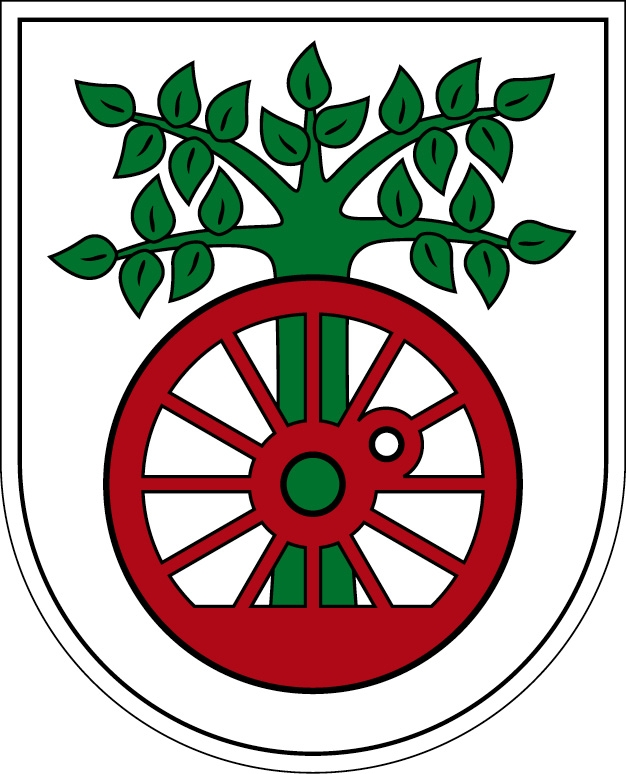
- Coat of arms

- Location of Borsigwalde in Reinickendorf district and Berlin
- Interactive map of Borsigwalde
- Location within Germany Location within Berlin
- Coordinates: 52°34′59″N 13°18′40″E
- Country: Germany
- State: Berlin
- City: Berlin
- Borough: Reinickendorf
- Founded: 1899

Area
  - Total: 2.0 km^{2} (0.77 sq mi)
- Elevation: 52 m (171 ft)

Population (2024-12-31)
  - Total: 7,101
  - Density: 3,600/km^{2} (9,200/sq mi)
- Time zone: UTC+01:00 (CET)
  - Summer (DST): UTC+02:00 (CEST)
- Postal codes: 13509
- Vehicle registration: B
- Website: Official website

Borsigwalde (German pronunciation: [ˈbɔʁzɪçˌvaldə]) is a German locality (Ortsteil) within the borough (Bezirk) of Reinickendorf, Berlin. Until 2012 was a zone (Ortslage) part of Wittenau.

== History ==
The locality, named after the engineer August Borsig, was first settled in 1899 and, on 1 October 1920, incorporated into Berlin with the Greater Berlin Act.

Part of Wittenau as a simple Ortslage, Borsigwalde became the 11th locality of Reinickendorf (and the 96th of Berlin) on 24 April 2012, following a decision by the boroughs assembly of 14 March. The decision was announced in the official gazette on 18 May 2012.

== Geography ==
Located in north of Berlin and in the middle of Reinickendorf, Borsigwalde borders with the localities of Tegel (west and south), Reinickendorf (southeast) and Wittenau (north and east). It is not too far from the Lake Tegel and on its north-eastern corner is located the Reinickendorf town hall.

== Transport ==
Borsigwalde is less than 1 km from Berlin-Tegel Airport and is linked to it by the A 111 motorway. The border with Tegel is crossed by the S-Bahn line S25, and Eichborndamm station serves the locality.

== Gallery ==
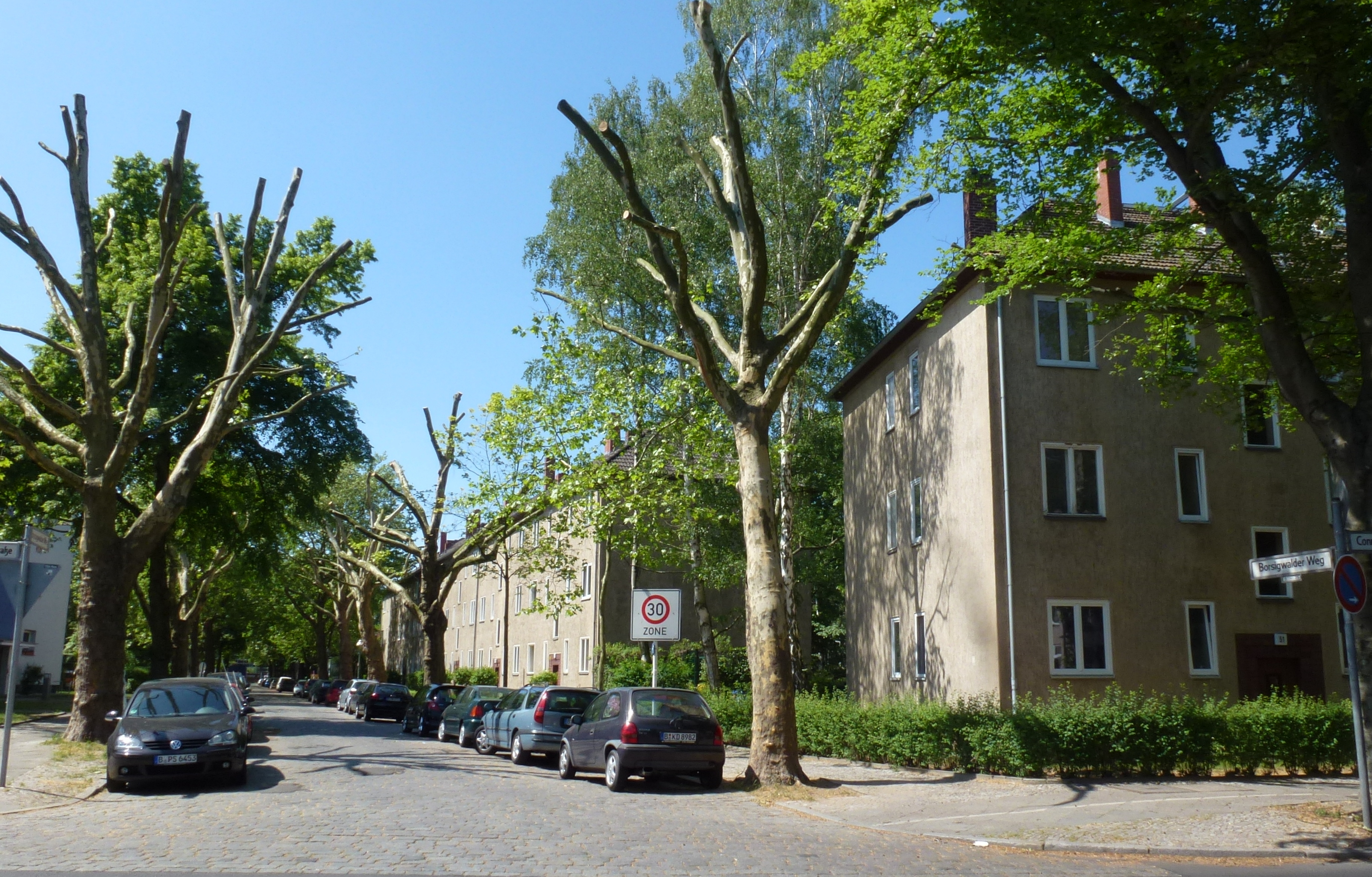
View of Borsigwalder Weg

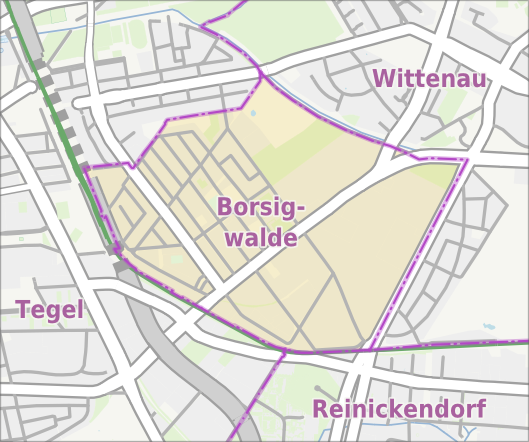
Road map of Borsigwalde
