= Reinickendorf 6 =

State electoral district of Germany

- Electoral district for the Berlin House of Representatives
- Reinickendorf 6 in 2026
- District: Reinickendorf
- Electorate: 29,204 (2026)

Current electoral district
- Party: CDU
- Member: Richard Gamp

Reinickendorf 6 is an electoral constituency (German: Wahlkreis) represented in the House of Representatives of Berlin. It elects one member via first-past-the-post voting.

== Geography ==
The constituency comprises the districts of Frohnau, Hermsdorf, and Freie Scholle. It is entirely within the borough of Reinickendorf.

There were 29,204 eligible voters in 2026.

== Members ==
Election	Member	Party	%
1999	CDU	Frank Steffel	62.3
2001	CDU	Frank Steffel	40.8
2006	CDU	Frank Steffel	42.3
2011	CDU	Jürn Jakob Schultze-Berndt	49.0
2016	CDU	Jürn Jakob Schultze-Berndt	39.7
2021	CDU	Frank Balzer	36.6
2023	CDU	Frank Balzer	45.7
2026	CDU	Richard Gamp	36.7

== Election results ==
=== 2026 election ===
State election (2026): Reinickendorf 6
Notes:	Blue background denotes the winner of the electorate vote. Pink background denotes a candidate elected from their party list. Yellow background denotes an electorate win by a list member, or other incumbent. A ✓ or ✗ denotes status of any incumbent, win or lose respectively.						
Party	Candidate	Votes	%	±%	Party votes	%	±%
CDU	Richard Gamp	8,939	36.7	▼9.0	9,003	36.8	▼7.2
Greens	Klara Josephine Schedlich	4,456	18.3	▲1.6	4,085	16.7	▲1.4
SPD	Kai Kottenstede	4,109	16.9	▼3.4	3,575	14.6	▼4.4
AfD	Thomas Ruschin	2,737	11.2	▲5.6	2,839	11.6	▲5.6
Left	Ben Hennig	1,740	7.1	▲4.8	2,295	9.4	▲5.9
FDP	Wilfried Bernhardt	961	3.9	▼1.2	1,044	4.3	▼2.5
Volt	Peter Brinkmann	516	2.1		537	2.2	▲1.5
BSW	Philipp Benjamin Erdmann	465	1.9		536	2.2	
APT	Leonhard Rettinghaus	436	1.8	▼0.1	373	1.5	▼0.2
PARTEI					101	0.4	▼0.3
PdF					43	0.2	
ÖDP					26	0.1	Steady
DKP					10	0.0	Steady
du.					8	0.0	Steady
SGP					4	0.0	Steady
Informal votes		302			182		
Total valid votes		24,359			24,479		
Turnout		24,661	84.4	▲5.4			
CDU hold	Majority	4,483	18.4	▼7.0			

=== 2023 repeat election ===
Changes denoted below for the 2023 election are compared to the 2016 election, as the 2021 election was declared invalid.

State election (2023): Reinickendorf 6
Notes:	Blue background denotes the winner of the electorate vote. Pink background denotes a candidate elected from their party list. Yellow background denotes an electorate win by a list member, or other incumbent. A ✓ or ✗ denotes status of any incumbent, win or lose respectively.						
Party	Candidate	Votes	%	±%	Party votes	%	±%
CDU	Frank Balzer	9,889	45.7	▲6.0	9,530	44.0	▲10.6
SPD	Kai Kottenstede	4,396	20.3	▼1.1	4,118	19.0	▲0.2
Greens	Klara Schedlich	3,615	16.7	▲3.4	3,307	15.3	▲1.2
AfD	Thomas Ruschin	1,230	5.7	▼4.3	1,301	6.0	▼4.8
FDP	Werner Witt	1,110	5.1	▼5.3	1,470	6.8	▼6.5
Left	Kai Bartosch	510	2.4	▼1.7	753	3.5	▼1.3
APT	Fiorina-Marie Telesca	415	1.9		363	1.7	▲0.5
PARTEI	Klaus Böttcher	194	0.9		164	0.8	▼0.1
Volt					142	0.7	
FW	Dirk Steffel	188	0.9		53	0.2	
dieBasis	Wolfgang Albrecht	107	0.5		99	0.5	
The Grays					62	0.3	
Gray Panthers					61	0.3	▼0.8
Pirates					45	0.2	▼0.4
ÖDP					30	0.1	
Verjüngungsforschung					23	0.1	▼0.1
Klimaliste					22	0.1	
Team Todenhöfer					22	0.1	
Humanists					20	0.1	
DKP					18	0.1	Steady
Bergpartei, die ÜberPartei					14	0.1	
Bildet Berlin!					14	0.1	
The Pinks/Alliance 21					12	0.1	
du.					10	0.0	
BüSo					8	0.0	
Mieterpartei					8	0.0	
NPD					5	0.0	▼0.1
SGP					5	0.0	Steady
LKR					2	0.0	▼0.5
REP					2	0.0	
Informal votes		151			114		
Total valid votes		21,654			21,683		
Turnout		21,836	79.0	▼2.8			
CDU hold	Majority	5,493	25.4				

== See also ==
- Politics of Berlin
- House of Representatives of Berlin
