= Ziegeleisee =

Lake in Reinickendorf, Berlin, Germany

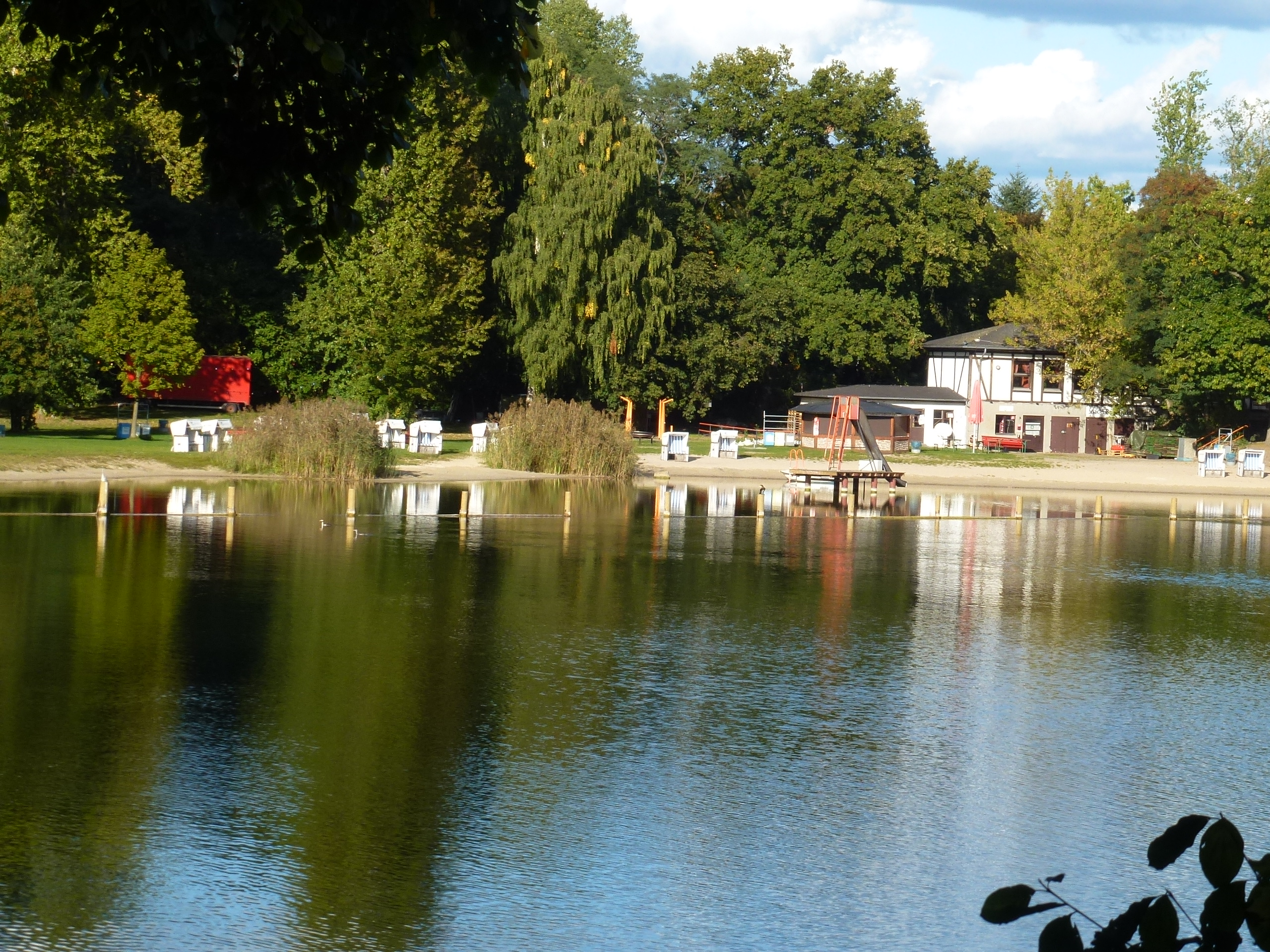
- Berlin-Lübars Freibad Lübars am Ziegeleisee

- Location within Germany
- Location: Berlin
- Coordinates: 52°37′N 13°20′E
- Basin countries: Germany
- Max. length: ca. 350 m (1,150 ft)
- Max. width: 200 m (660 ft)
- Surface area: 4.7 ha (12 acres)
- Average depth: 6.28 m (20.6 ft)
- Max. depth: 14.1 m (46 ft)
- Water volume: 294,650 m^{3} (10,405,000 cu ft)
- Shore length^{1}: 912 m (2,992 ft)
- Settlements: Berlin-Lübars
- ^{1} Shore length is not a well-defined measure.

Ziegeleisee is a lake in Berlin, Germany. At an elevation of 35 m (115 ft), its surface area is 4.7 ha.

== History ==
During the Bronze Age – more than 3,000 years ago – clay was mined in the area of loam in order to produce pots and jars. Starting in 1840 the Kühnsche brickyard was extended by a clay and cement products factory. Following the bankruptcy of 1880, the factory building of 1883 was up until the 1960s as a day-and-garden "Seeschloß" used with dance hall and bowling alley. Today, no traces of the factory are found.

Another brickyard was built in 1854. It was modern and bigger and had a more effective ring oven which can have up to 12,000 burnt bricks daily. The brickyard was in operation until 1924. The 72 m-high (236 ft) chimney was blown in 1932. A time to plant belonging building still stands in the Beneke Dorff Road 115, which is named after the former mill owners.

Famous buildings, which were built from the bricks of the local brickworks, are the Red City Hall and the City Hall Reinickendorfer.

By 1912, a lake was eventually created by the slow flow of groundwater. It was 30 to 40 m deep. Other witnessed the two flooded former clay pits (about 50 × 50 × 50 m and 150 m). They are located west, 500 meters away. Several surrounding street names also reminiscent of the clay mining.

== Geography ==
The lake is located in Lübars, a locality belonging to the Berliner borough of Reinickendorf.

The shape of the lake resembles a trapezoid (geometry) from the well Südsüdostufer 300 m (980 ft) long, which is followed by the east at a right angle, a 150 m-long (490 ft) beach and under which a 200 m-long (660 ft) beach faces parallel. In the north-north-east is a well 200 m-long (660 ft) beach, the final oblique side of the "trapezoid".

In the southern part of the bank overgrown with reeds and trees, steep and inaccessible and can not be swum. In the northern part, the banks are flat and occupied by 1926 built pool Lübars (lido Lübars). There are lawn, kept sandy beach and a few artificially fixed portions. The managed pool has basic facilities to bars, beach chair rentals and various sports and play facilities and the designated naturist area. The lake is accessible only through the pool.

There is an inflow about 75 meters away and about 4 to 5 acre lake Hermsdorfer. This in turn flows through the Tegeler Fliess, which ultimately results in Lake Tegel.
