= Tegeler Fließ =

River in Germany

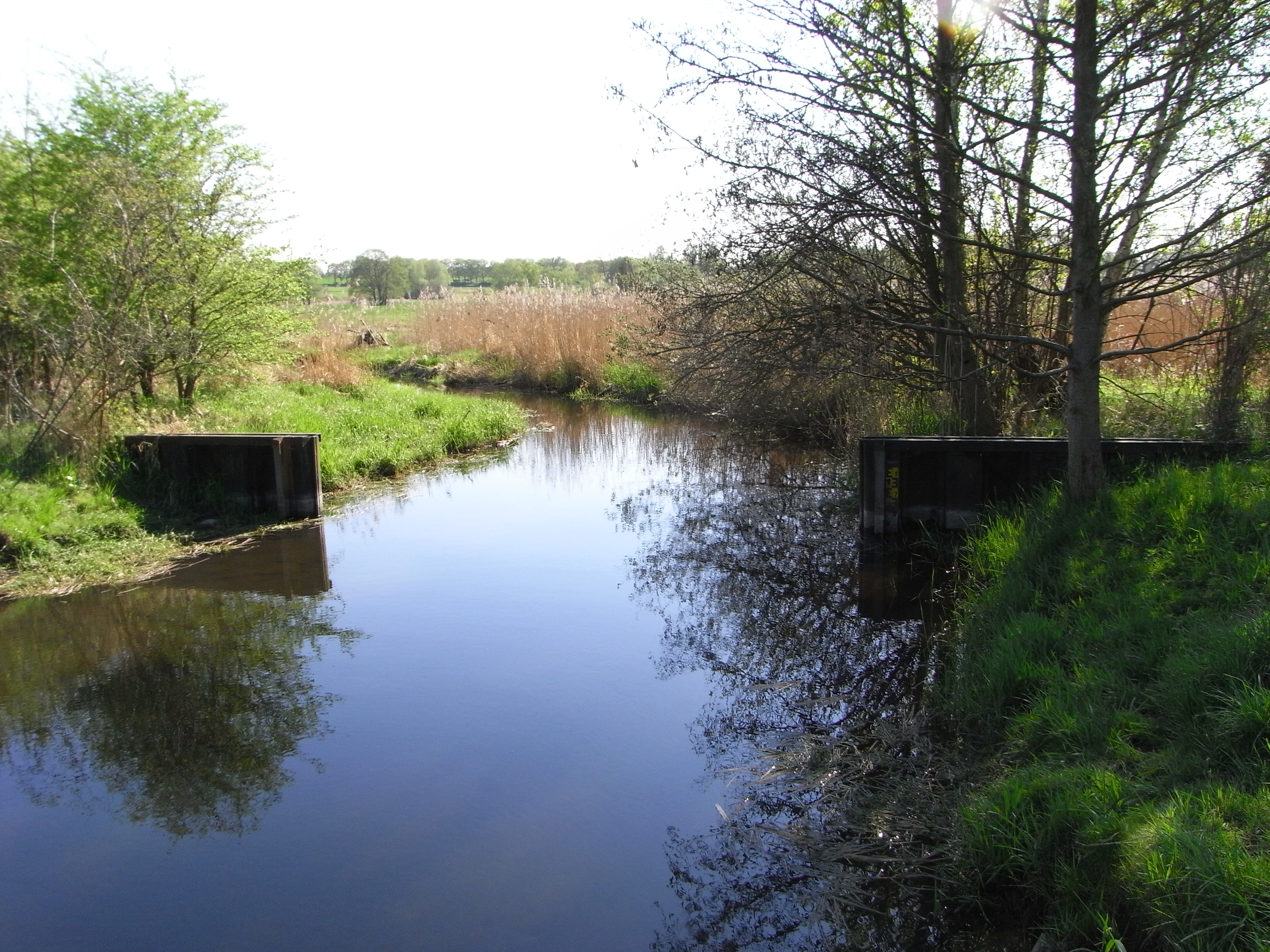
- The river at the former GDR Border

Location
- Country: Germany
- State: Brandenburg, Berlin

Physical characteristics
- Mouth
  - location: Tegeler See
  - coordinates: 52°35′33″N 13°16′44″E
- Length: 27 km (17 mi)
- Basin size: 126 km^{2} (49 sq mi)

Basin features
- Progression: Havel→ Elbe→ North Sea

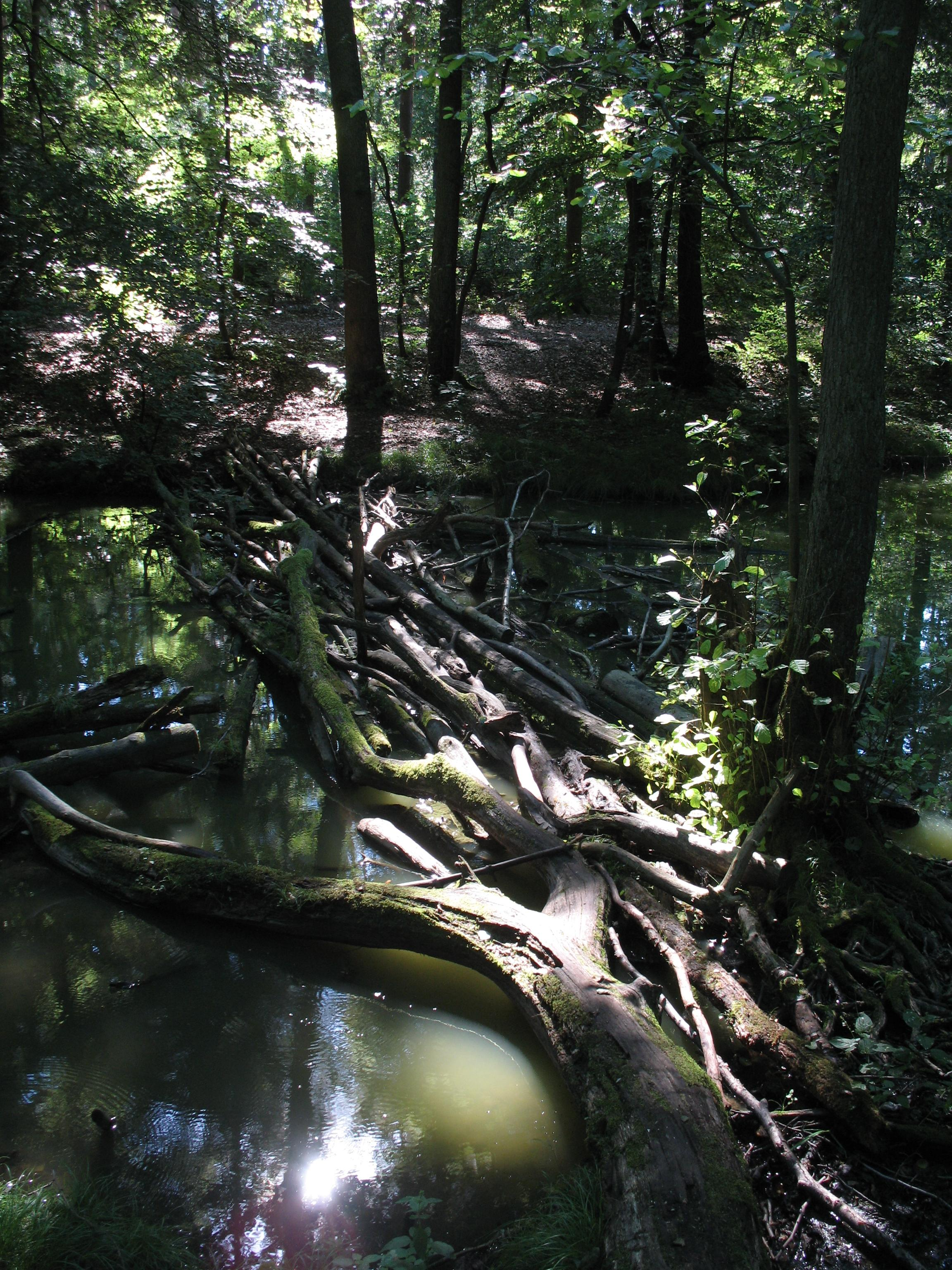
Tegeler Fließ

The Tegeler Fließ (Tegeler Fließ) is a 27 km-long stream in Brandenburg and Berlin. It is named after the Tegel district of Berlin through which it flows. Its basin area is 126 km^{2} (49 sq mi).

The river's source is in Basdorf and it flows down into Lake Tegel. The Kindelfließ is a tributary of it.
