= Kindelfließ =

River in Germany

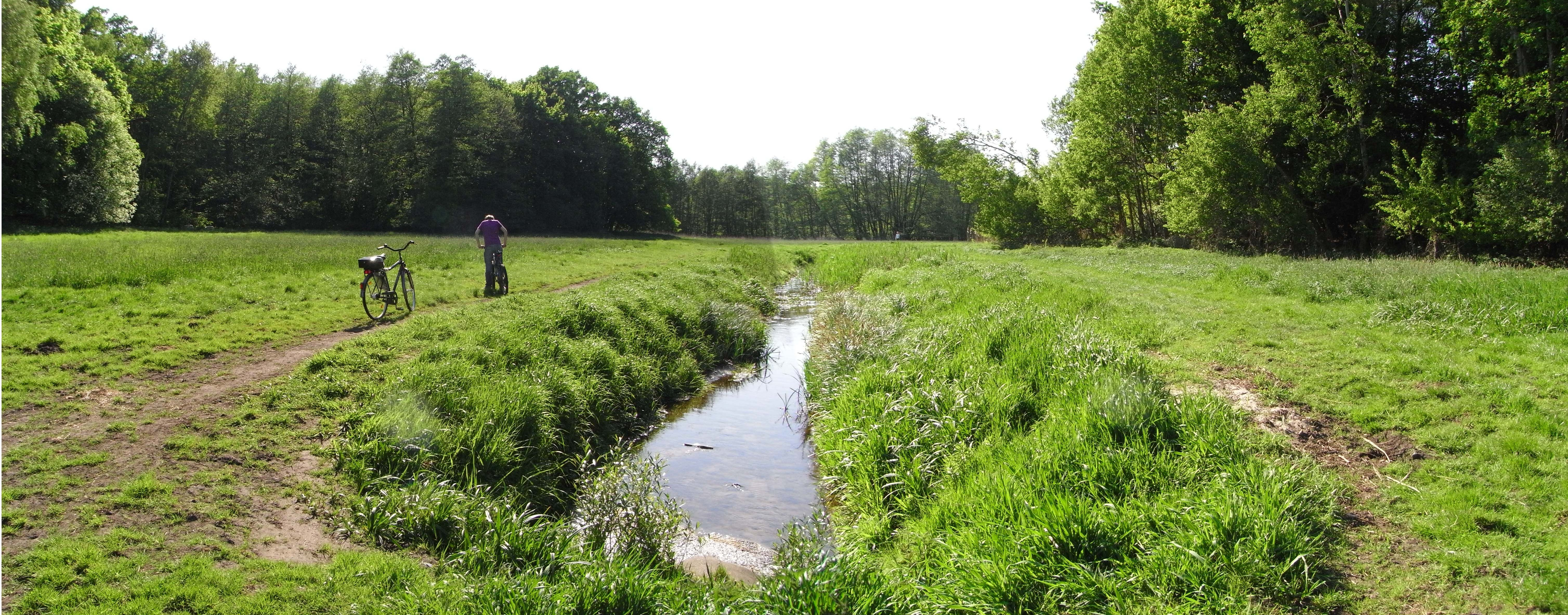
- The river in Brandenburg

Location
- Country: Germany
- Location: Brandenburg, Berlin

Physical characteristics
- Mouth
  - location: Tegeler Fließ
  - coordinates: 52°37′25″N 13°20′37″E

Basin features
- Progression: Tegeler Fließ→ Havel→ Elbe→ North Sea

The Kindelfließ is a small river that flows through the state of Brandenburg. It runs to the east of Glienicke/Nordbahn into Berlin, where, just over the border, it meets with the Tegeler Fließ.
