= Otisstraße station =

Station of the Berlin U-Bahn

Coordinates: 52°34′16″N 13°18′10″E

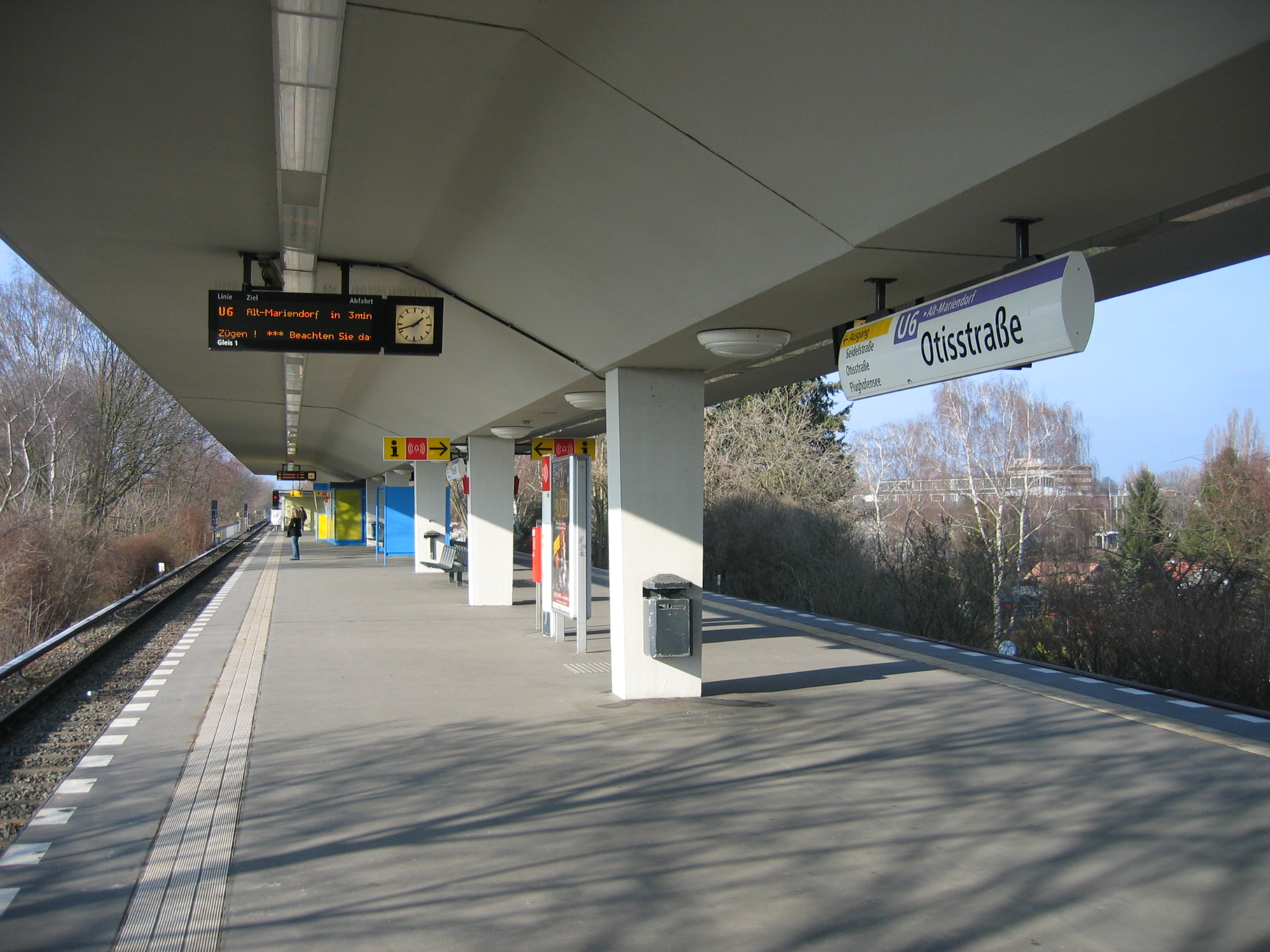
Platform view, Otisstraße U-Bahn station

Otisstraße is a Berlin U-Bahn station located on the U6 line.

It was constructed in 1958 by the architect B. Grimmek. In the beginning "Flugplatz Tegel" (Tegel Aerodrome) was appended to the station's name. This was changed to "Flughafen Tegel" (Tegel Airport) in 1961. This addition was deleted in 1974.

| Preceding station | Berlin U-Bahn | Following station |
|---|---|---|
| Holzhauser Straße towards Alt-Tegel | U6 | Scharnweberstraße towards Alt-Mariendorf |
