= Märkisches Viertel =

- Quarter of Berlin
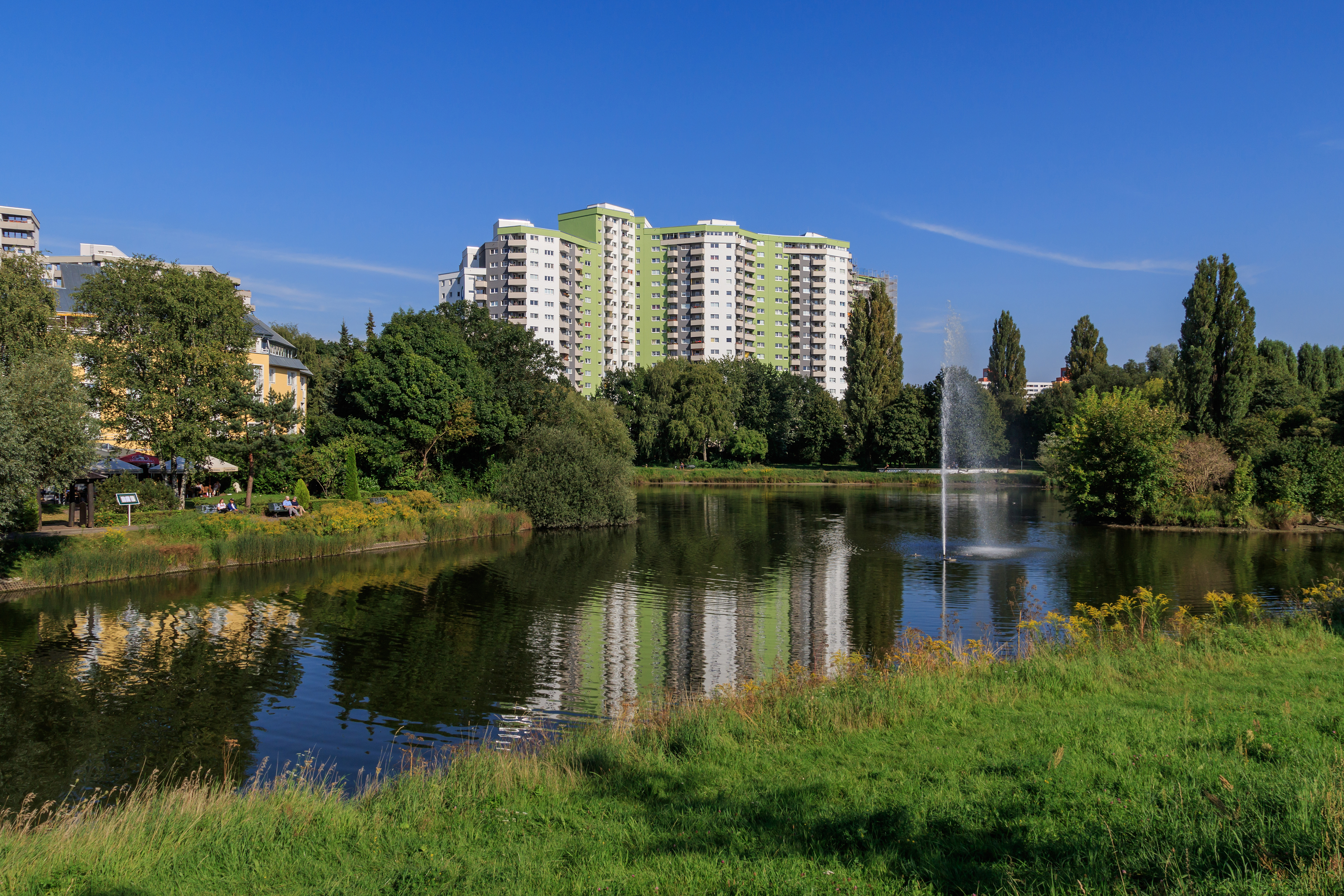
- Pond and apartment buildings

- Location of Märkisches Viertel in Reinickendorf district and Berlin
- Interactive map of Märkisches Viertel
- Location within Germany Location within Berlin
- Coordinates: 52°36′00″N 13°21′30″E
- Country: Germany
- State: Berlin
- City: Berlin
- Borough: Reinickendorf
- Founded: 1964

Area
  - Total: 3.2 km^{2} (1.2 sq mi)
- Elevation: 52 m (171 ft)

Population (2024-12-31)
  - Total: 41,254
  - Density: 13,000/km^{2} (33,000/sq mi)
- Time zone: UTC+01:00 (CET)
  - Summer (DST): UTC+02:00 (CEST)
- Postal codes: 13435, 13439
- Vehicle registration: B
- Website: Official website

Märkisches Viertel (German pronunciation: [ˈmɛʁkɪʃəs ˈfɪʁtl̩], MV) is a German locality (Ortsteil) in the borough (Bezirk) of Reinickendorf in Berlin. Its name refers to the March of Brandenburg (German: Mark Brandenburg).

== Overview ==
It consists of a large housing estate of about 17,000 apartments with chains of high-rises up to 18 floors that were built from 1964 to 1974 by the GeSoBau Gesellschaft für sozialen Wohnungsbau (Association for Social Apartment Construction). Originally a part of Wittenau, it became an officially recognized locality of its own in 1999.

To the east it shares its border with the Rosenthal and Wilhelmsruh localities of the Pankow borough, from which it was separated by the Berlin Wall until 1989. In 2003 Märkisches Viertel had about 36,000 inhabitants. The district is located on the eastern edge of the district Reinickendorf, almost exactly halfway up its north-south extent.

In the south and east borders the Märkische district to the district Pankow and was thereby directly at the Berlin wall. In the northeast, the settlement is limited by the course of the Quickborner road, while the district includes the underlying industrial area to the district border to Pankow. In the north, a former railway line (part of the Tegel-Friedrichsfelde industrial railway) forms the limit. Immediately to the north lies the Lübars amusement park in the rural district of Lübars. The demarcation at this point seems almost brutal: Immediately south of the tracks rise partly ten-storey skyscrapers, while on the north side allotments and cereal fields.

In the northwest, the boundary of the settlement is not entirely clear. The railway line bends slightly to the south, but no longer approaches the skyscrapers. However, north of the railway, at the junction with the Eichhorster way, the district heating plant of the Märkisches quarter. At this point, the next skyscrapers are already around 500 meters away. At the same time, more skyscrapers north of Wittenauer Strasse (up to the Zabel-Krüger dam and the intervening Titiseestraße) can be found looking outward about 200 meters away, although they are no longer part of the Märkisches Viertel, even though they date back to the same period. They belong to the Reinickendorf district Waidmannslust. The western boundary is the railway embankment of the Berlin Northern Railway, a railway line, which is now used by the S-Bahn. To the west, the district joins Wittenau.

The circle closes in the south at the point where the S-Bahn crosses the Nordgraben, which is also delimitation to Pankow. Immediately south of the Nordgraben lies the factory area of Bergmann-Borsig, which has been reorganized since 2000 into a business park (Pankow Park). In the east, the northern moat meets the Heidekraut railway tracks for about one kilometer, from where it crosses, and forms the boundary to the east, lying on the Pankow region.

== Transport ==
Already the first residents of the Märkisches Viertel were promised a connection to the subway in the late 1960s. Early plans provided for a connection directly from the south, which was to end in the Märkisches Zentrum or one station further on the Senftenberger Ring. Allegedly, there should be smaller advance payments (rather: constructive considerations) in the area of individual high-rise foundations or foundations. South of the Wilhelmsruher dam a free track is visible that is not built on skyscrapers (towards Tornower Weg). These plans were never realized and rejected at the latest in the 1970s. Instead, a subway line was planned from the west under the Wilhelmsruher dam. While the tour up to the Märkisches Zentrum was clear, there were considerations to renounce a northward pivoting extension to the Senftenberg ring in order to extend the route straight to the district border after Pankow - after a - not expected at the time - reunification of both halves of the city.

This plan was implemented only partially under the S-Bahn station on the western edge. On September 24, 1994 – 20 years after the completion of the Märkisches Viertel - the underground station with the name Wittenau (Wilhelmsruher Damm) was opened. It is the extension of the U8 subway line from the Paracelsus-Bad train station. At the same time the S-Bahn station of Wittenau (Northern Railway) in Wittenau (Wilhelmsruher Damm) was renamed. The management of the S -Bahn was in the meantime (after German reunification) of the BVG to the S -Bahn Berlin GmbH, a company of Deutsche Bahn AG, passed. There are plans for the U8 to be extended to Märkisches Viertel as well.

Even before the construction of the Märkisches Viertel of the S-Bahn station Wittenau was available. It lies on the railway embankment of the Berlin Northern Railway, which forms the western boundary. For two reasons, the station was not originally considered as a transport connection for the settlement: Although it is located on the east-west main axis, however, the access was on the northern, the Wilhelmsruher dam away side (at Göschenplatz). The second and more important reason lay in the special political conditions of West Berlin and the S-Bahn, which was operated until 1984 by the German Reichsbahn. Of the population of the Märkisches quarter, the S-Bahn was almost completely boycotted (S-Bahn boycott). Only after the takeover of the S -Bahn by the BVG in 1984, this situation changed. After modernization work on the S-Bahn line in 1986, the southern entrance of the S-Bahn station was put into operation.

Despite the boycott of the rapid-transit railway two measures in connection with the S-Bahn route were accomplished in the course of the establishment of the Märkisches Viertel in the 1970s years: The bridge over the Wilhelmsruher dam was new built and thereby forward-looking arranged so that between the two S-Bahn tracks remained space for a platform access and thus the platform could start immediately at Wilhelmsruher dam. The second measure was a new S-Bahn bridge over the newly created Schorfheidestraße a little further south. Here was also another S-Bahn station provided; About halfway between the stations Wittenau and Wilhelmsruh.

The nearest tramway line ends east of the Märkisches Viertel at the stop Rosenthal Nord at the district border of Pankow. In the planning is a straight line extension over the Wilhelmsruher dam west to the station Wittenau. The need for this is given, because on the Wilhelmsruher dam per direction currently on average every 2½ minutes a bus runs. The Senate, however, is reluctant to invest in new tram routes. The route is currently only in the long-term planning.

On the eastern edge of the Märkisches Viertel, the tracks of the Heidekrautbahn have been accessible since the fall of the Berlin Wall. The owner of the railway, the Niederbarnimer railway, plans in principle a re-commissioning of the route from Basdorf to the S-Bahn station Wilhelmsruh or beyond, including the construction of a new breakpoint on the eastern edge of the Märkisches Viertel. A time of realization is not foreseeable. On some weekends on the route to Basdorf special rides with historic - mainly steam-powered - trains from the Berliner Eisenbahnfreunde e. V. performed.

The section to the north, a section of the Tegel-Friedrichsfelde industrial railway, has been shut down without the prospect of reactivation. The route was never intended for passenger traffic.

== Notable people ==
The rapper Sido and several artists of his Aggro Berlin record label were born or grew up here.
