= Baumwerder =

2-hectare uninhabited island in Blowatz, Germany

Geography
- Location: Baltic Sea
- Coordinates: 53.963110°N 11.476451°E
- Area: 0.02 km^{2} (0.0077 sq mi)
- Length: 0.325 km (0.2019 mi)
- Width: 0.135 km (0.0839 mi)

Administration
- DE-MV

Demographics
- Population: 0

Baumwerder is an uninhabited island, approximately 2 hectares in area, in the Breitling facing a bay. It belongs to the municipality of Blowatz.

The flat bodden island is approximately 325 metres long and 135 metres wide. It is shaped like a triangle with a larger indentation on its north side. It is located 50 metres from the mainland.

Numerous species of bird breed on the island, including merganser (Mergus serrator), gadwall (Anas strepera) and shelduck (Tadorna tadorna).

Baumwerder is part of the Special Area of Conservation known as Wismar Bay and the bird reserve of "Wismar Bay and Salzhaff".
