= Lake Tegel =

Second largest lake in Berlin

Tegeler See Lake Tegel
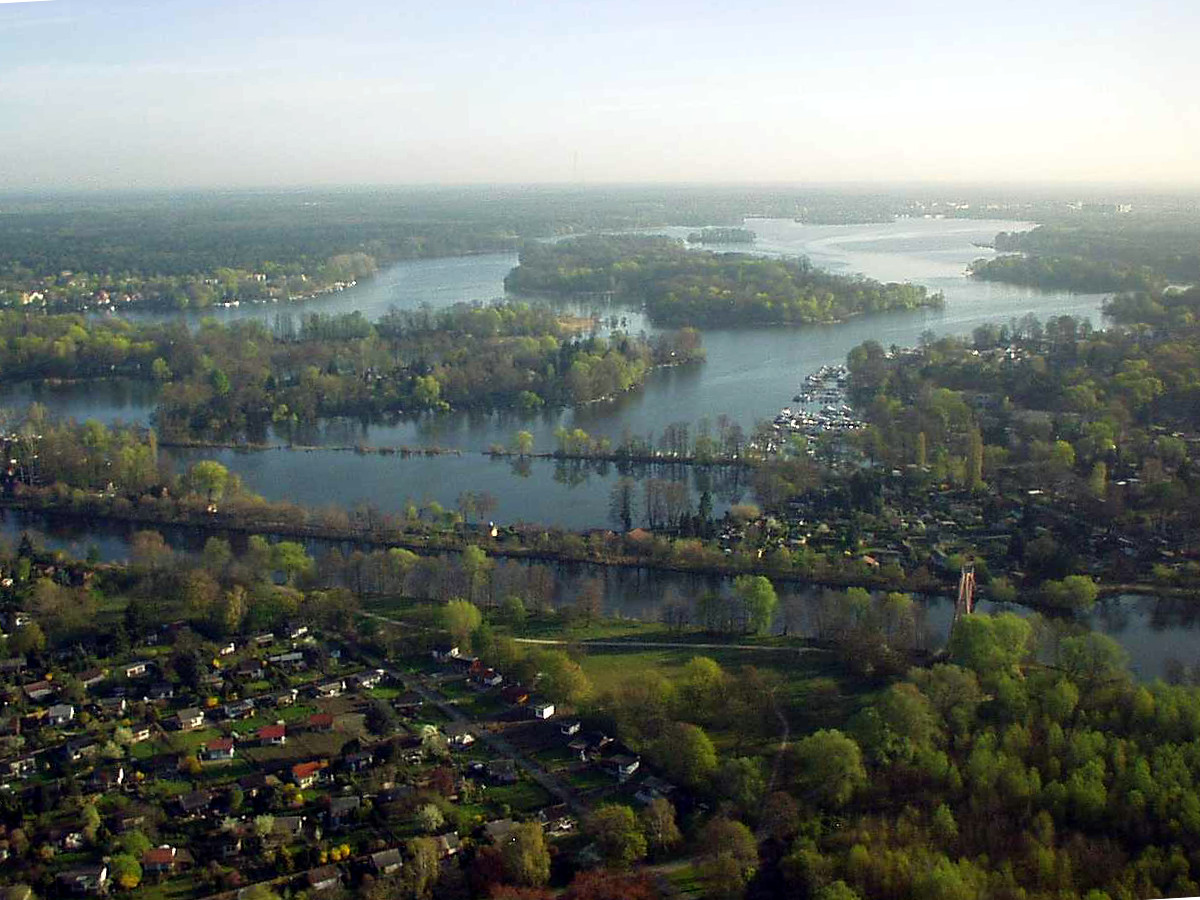

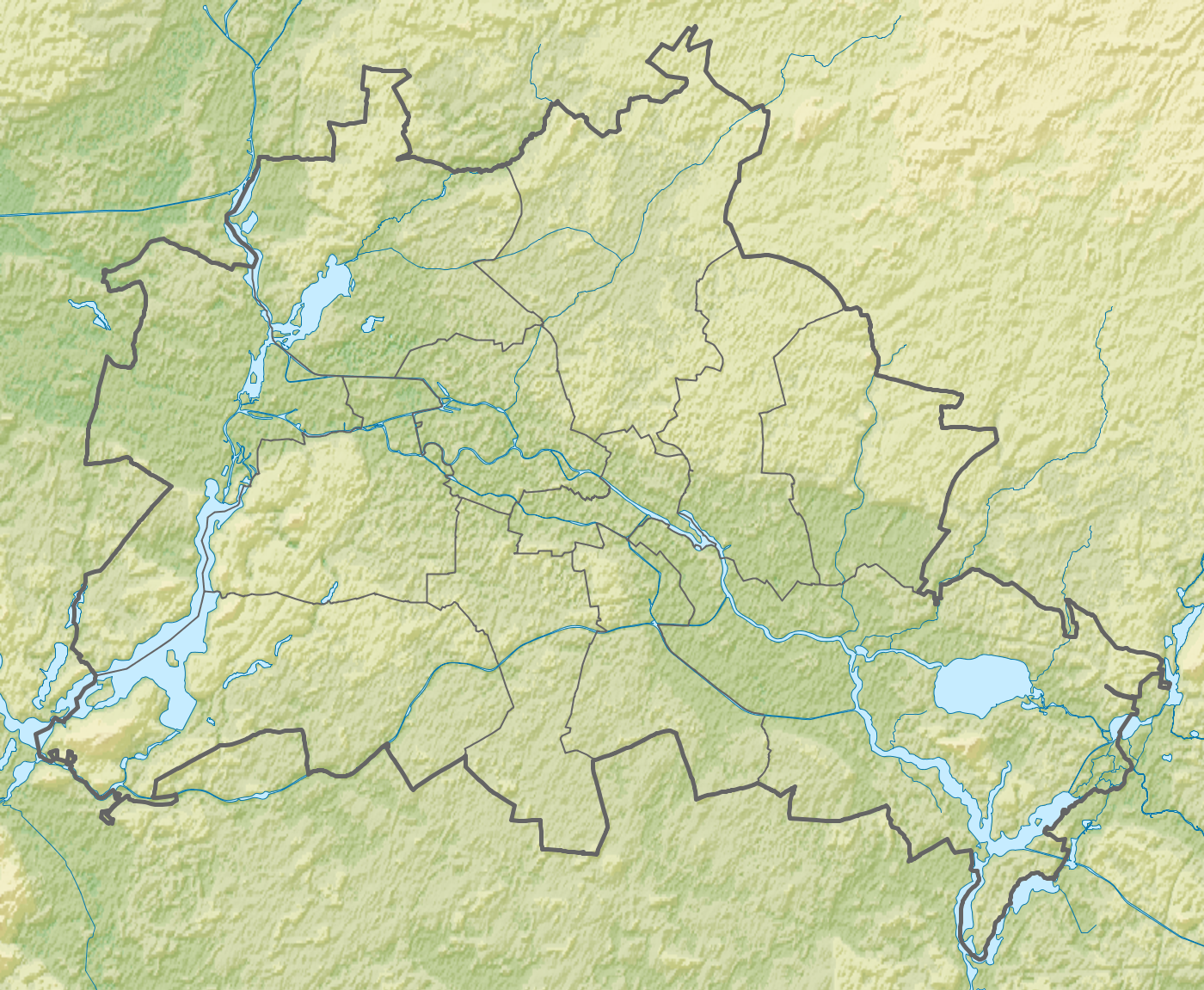
- Location within Berlin
- Location: Berlin
- Coordinates: 52°35′0″N 13°16′0″E
- Primary inflows: Havel, Tegeler Fließ
- Primary outflows: Havel
- Basin countries: Germany
- Max. length: 4 km (2.5 mi)
- Surface area: 4.61 km^{2} (1.78 mi^{2})
- Average depth: 7.9 m (26 ft)
- Max. depth: 16 m (52 ft)
- Islands: Hasselwerder, Lindwerder, Scharfenberg, Reiswerder, Baumwerder, Valentinswerder, Maienwerder
- Settlements: Tegel, Tegelort

Lake Tegel (German: Tegeler See) (German pronunciation) is the second largest lake in Berlin, Germany. It is situated in the northwest of the city in the Reinickendorf borough, in the Ortsteil of Tegel.

== Overview ==
The historic name Tegel (first recorded in 1322 as Tygel) is common for a larger territory and also used for the settlements of the Tegel locality, the Tegelort ("Tegel Village") neighbourhood within the Konradshöhe locality and the Berlin-Tegel International Airport.

The lake is connected to the navigable River Havel, which flows in and out of the lake at its western end. The lake is navigable to its eastern end, and navigation is administered as part of the Havel–Oder–Wasserstraße.

Most of the waterfront of the lake is privately held. Within the lake are the islands of Hasselwerder, Lindwerder, Scharfenberg, Reiswerder, Baumwerder, Valentinswerder and Maienwerder. Scharfenberg, Valentinswerder and Maienwerder are accessible by some of Berlin's ferry services.

Lake Tegel

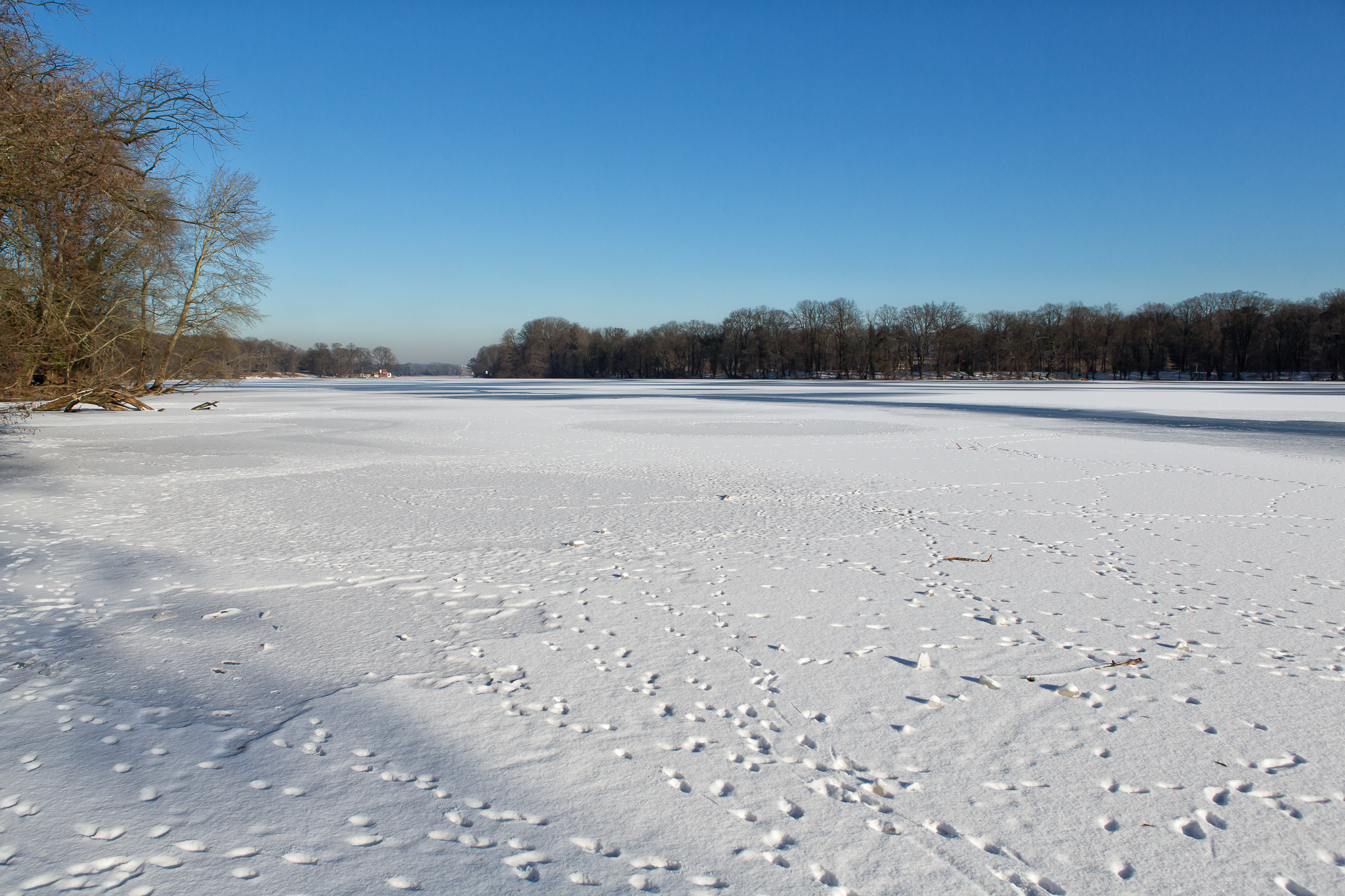

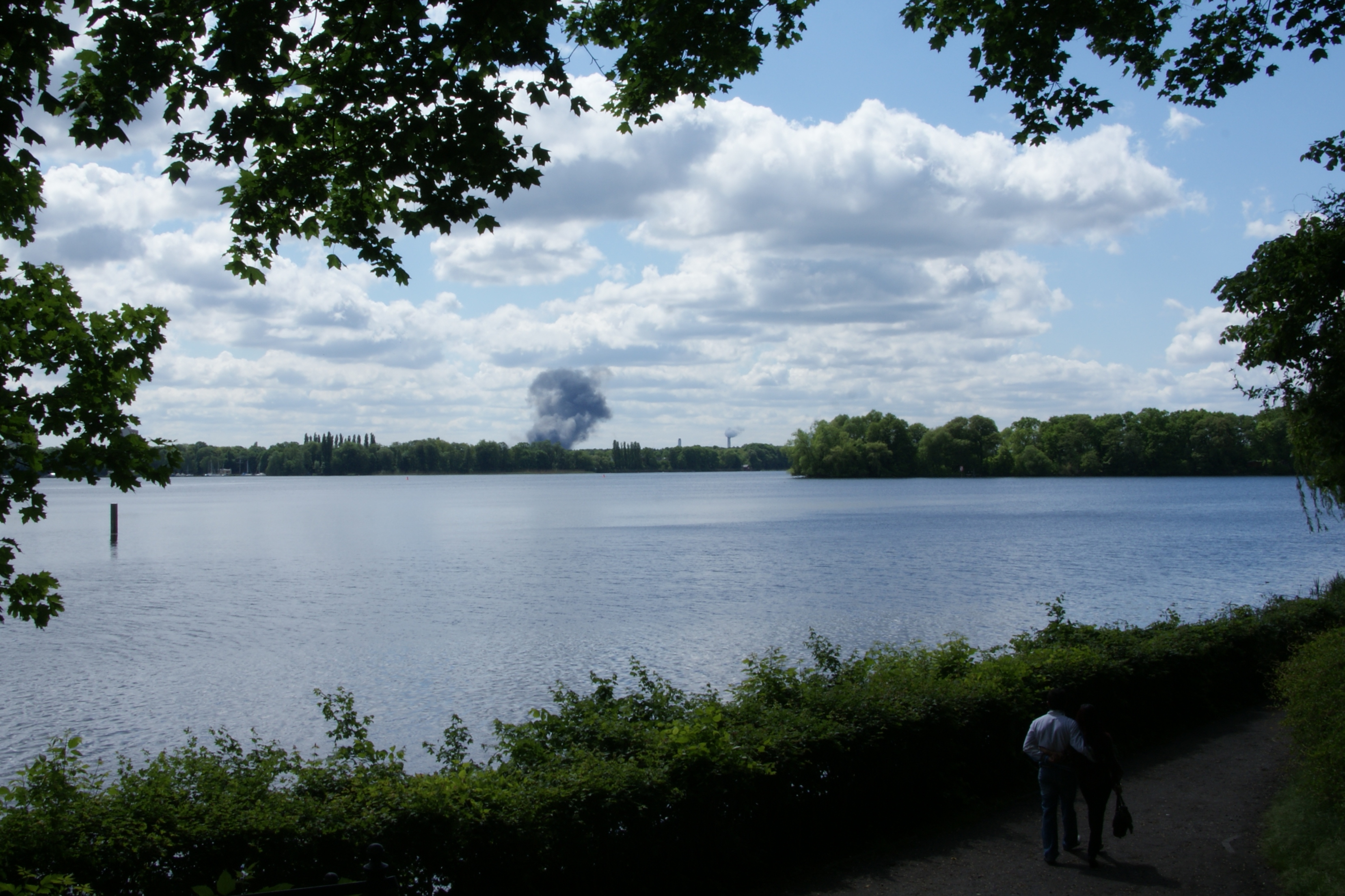

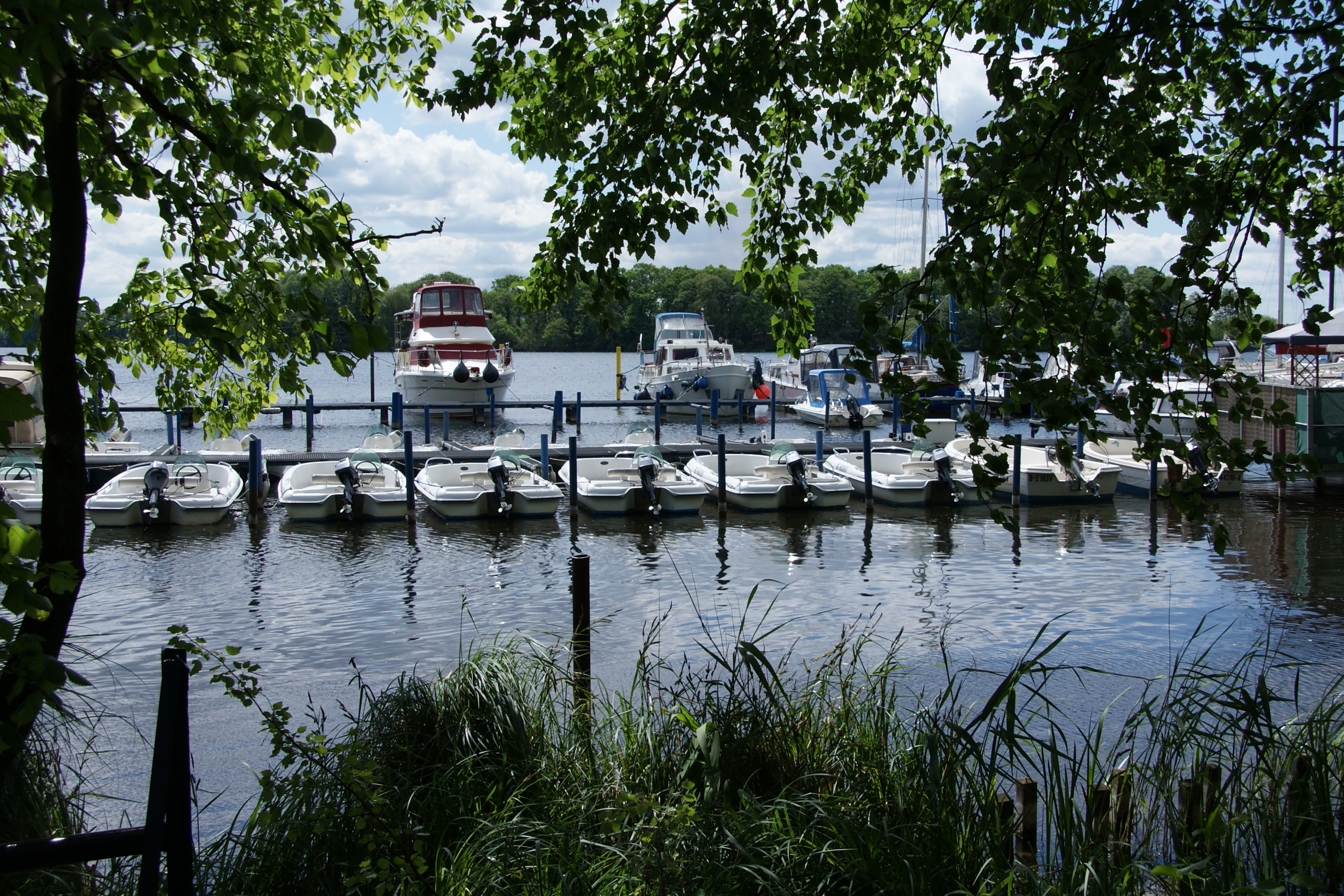

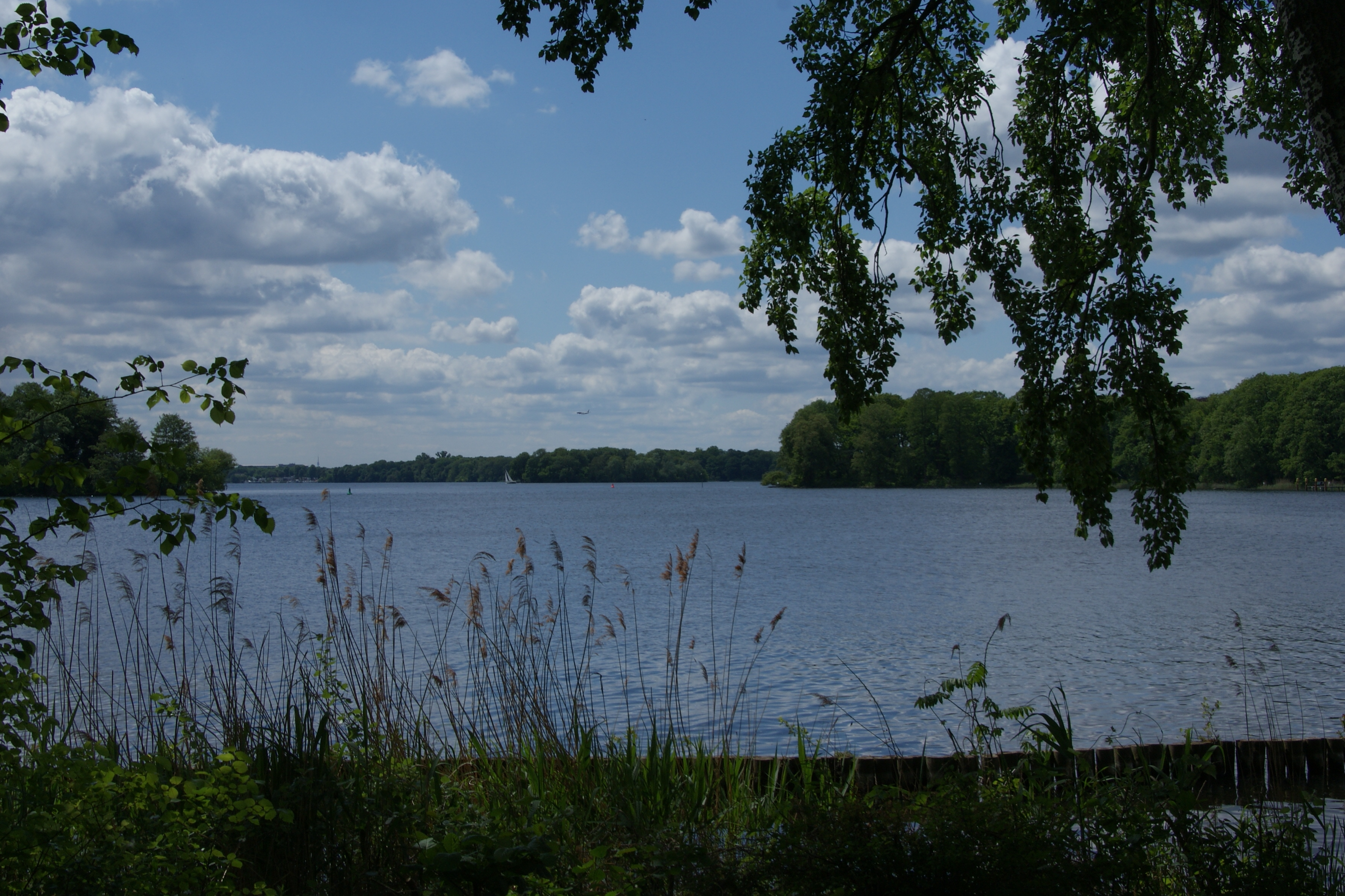
