= Reinickendorf =

- Borough of Berlin
- Flag Coat of arms

- Location of Reinickendorf in Berlin
- Interactive map of Reinickendorf
- Location within Germany Location within Berlin
- Coordinates: 52°34′N 13°20′E
- Country: Germany
- State: Berlin
- City: Berlin
- Subdivisions: 11 localities

Government
  - Mayor: Uwe Brockhausen (SPD)

Area
  - Total: 89.5 km^{2} (34.6 sq mi)
- Elevation: 35 m (115 ft)

Population (2024-12-31)
  - Total: 260,300
  - Density: 2,910/km^{2} (7,530/sq mi)
- Time zone: UTC+01:00 (CET)
  - Summer (DST): UTC+02:00 (CEST)
- Vehicle registration: B
- Website: Official website

Reinickendorf (German pronunciation: [ˈʁaɪnɪkn̩ˌdɔʁf]) is the twelfth borough of Berlin. It encompasses the northwest of the city area, including the Berlin Tegel Airport, Lake Tegel, spacious settlements of detached houses as well as housing estates like Märkisches Viertel.

== Subdivisions ==
Subdivisions of Reinickendorf

Reinickendorf is split in eleven localities, population in brackets:

- Reinickendorf (83,467)
- Tegel (36,697)
- Konradshöhe (5,960)
- Heiligensee (18,053)
- Frohnau (16,540)
- Hermsdorf (16,644)
- Waidmannslust (11,027)
- Lübars (5,137)
- Wittenau (25,051)
- Märkisches Viertel (40,447)
- Borsigwalde (6,749)

== Politics ==
=== District council ===
The governing body of Reinickendorf is the district council (Bezirksverordnetenversammlung). It has responsibility for passing laws and electing the city government, including the mayor. The most recent district council election was held on 26 September 2021, and the results were as follows:

Party	Lead candidate	Votes	%	+/-	Seats	+/-
Christian Democratic Union (CDU)	Michael Wegner	37,514	29.0	▼6.6	18	▼3
Social Democratic Party (SPD)	Uwe Brockhausen	30,823	23.8	▲2.4	15	▲2
Alliance 90/The Greens (Grüne)	Güneș Keskin	18,525	14.3	▲3.9	9	▲3
Alternative for Germany (AfD)	Sebastian Maack	12,291	9.5	▼4.9	6	▼2
Free Democratic Party (FDP)	David Jahn	9,473	7.3	▲0.7	4	±0
The Left (LINKE)	Felix Lederle	6,695	5.2	▼0.2	3	±0
Tierschutzpartei		3,639	2.8	New	0	New
Free Voters		2,785	2.2	New	0	New
The Greys		2,452	1.9	New	0	New
dieBasis		1,829	1.4	New	0	New
Die PARTEI		1,825	1.4	▲0.1	0	±0
Tierschutz hier		1,080	0.8	New	0	New
Ecological Democratic Party		229	0.2	New	0	New
National Democratic Party		146	0.1	▼0.3	0	±0
BÄRLÄ		134	0.1	New	0	New
Valid votes		129,440	98.8			
Invalid votes		1,525	1.2			
Total		130,965	100.0		55	±0
Electorate/voter turnout		194,688	67.3	▲4.4		
Source: Elections Berlin

=== District government ===
The district mayor (Bezirksbürgermeister) is elected by the Bezirksverordnetenversammlung, and positions in the district government (Bezirksamt) are apportioned based on party strength. Uwe Brockhausen of the SPD was elected mayor on 24 November 2021. Since the 2021 municipal elections, the composition of the district government is as follows:

Councillor	Party	Portfolio
Uwe Brockhausen	SPD	District Mayor; Finance, Staff and Culture
Emine Demirbüken-Wegner	CDU	Deputy Mayor; Social Affairs and Civil Service
Korinna Stephan	GRÜNE	Urban Development, Environment and Traffic
Harald Muschner	CDU	Education, Sport and Logistics
Alexander Ewers	SPD	Youth, Family and Health
Julia Schrod-Thiel	CDU	Public Order
Source: Berlin.de

== Twin towns – sister cities ==
Reinickendorf is twinned with:

- Antony, France (1966)
- Bad Steben, Germany (1988)
- Blomberg, Germany (1990)
- Greenwich (London), England, United Kingdom (1966)
- Kiryat Ata, Israel (1976)
- Melle, Germany (1988)
- Vogelsberg (district), Germany (1964)

== Notable people ==
- Anne Julia Hagen, Miss Germany 2010
- Thomas Häßler (born 1966), footballer
- Reinhard Mey, Musician
- Andreas Neuendorf, footballer
- Robert Russ, music producer, Grammy winner 2018
- Marie Schlei, politician
- Frank Steffel, politician

== See also ==
- Berlin-Reinickendorf (electoral district)
