= Tegel =

Quarter of Berlin, Germany

- Quarter of Berlin
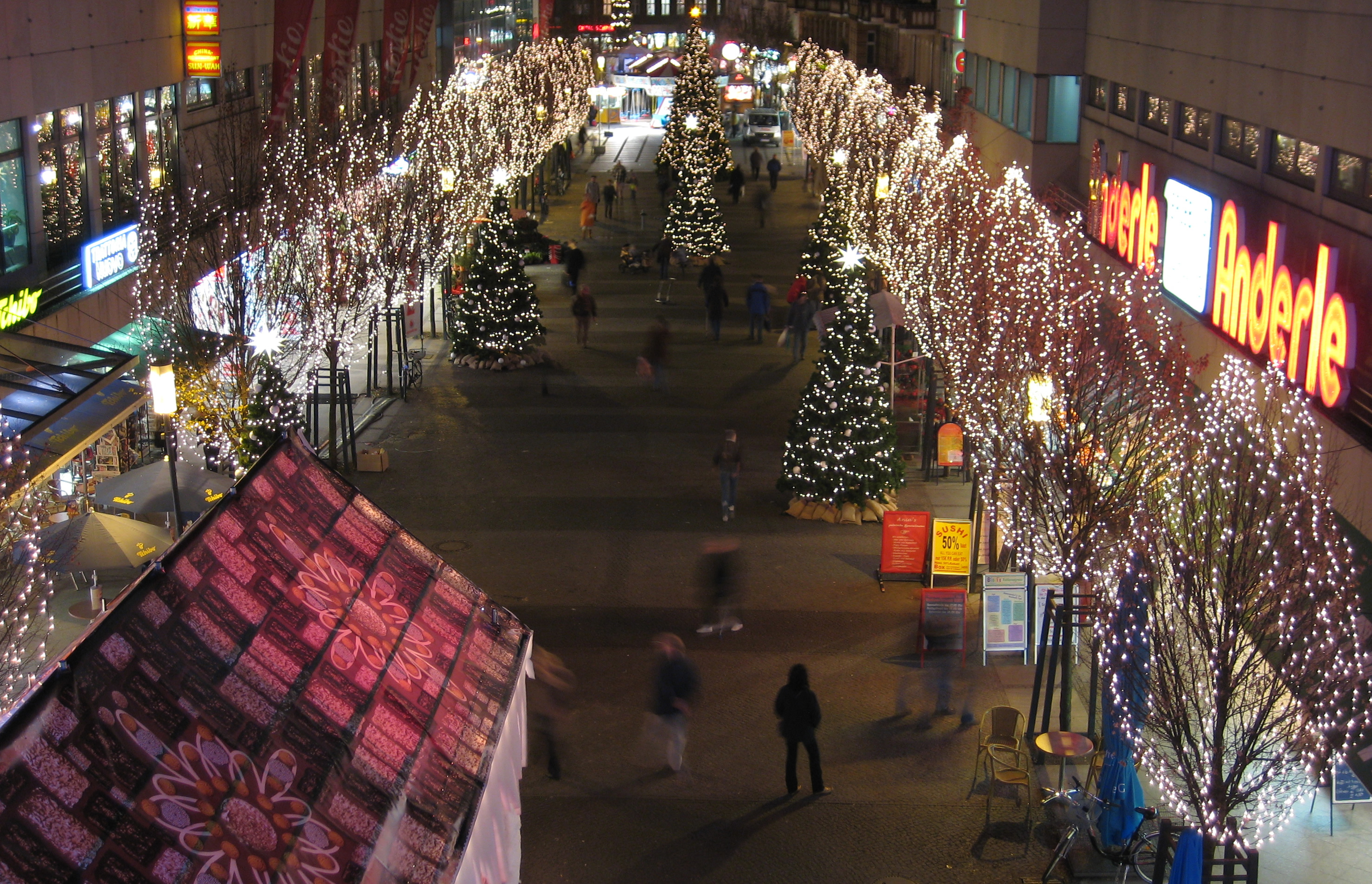
- Gorkistrasse in the old town

- Location of Tegel in Reinickendorf district and Berlin
- Interactive map of Tegel
- Location within Germany Location within Berlin
- Coordinates: 52°35′00″N 13°17′00″E
- Country: Germany
- State: Berlin
- City: Berlin
- Borough: Reinickendorf
- Founded: 1558

Area
  - Total: 33.7 km^{2} (13.0 sq mi)
- Elevation: 52 m (171 ft)

Population (2024-12-31)
  - Total: 41,277
  - Density: 1,220/km^{2} (3,170/sq mi)
- Time zone: UTC+01:00 (CET)
  - Summer (DST): UTC+02:00 (CEST)
- Postal codes: 13405, 13503, 13505, 13507, 13509
- Vehicle registration: B

Tegel (German: [ˈteːɡl̩]) is a locality (Ortsteil) in the Berlin borough of Reinickendorf on the shore of Lake Tegel. The Tegel locality, the second largest in area (after Köpenick) of the 96 Berlin districts, also includes the neighbourhood of Saatwinkel.

== History ==
The Tegel Palace (or Humboldt Palace), originally a Renaissance manor house from 1558 and a hunting lodge of Elector Frederick William of Brandenburg, was bequeathed to the Humboldt family in 1797. Alexander von Humboldt and Wilhelm von Humboldt lived here for several years. In 1824 Wilhelm had the palace rebuilt in a Neoclassical style by Karl Friedrich Schinkel. In the park is a tomb, where Alexander, Wilhelm, and other members of the Humboldt family are buried. From 1927 until 1931 Tegel Palace was the site of a sanatorium, founded by the psychoanalyst Ernst Simmel (1882–1947).

From 1898 on Tegel was the seat of the Borsig-Werke steam locomotive manufacturing company until it moved to Hennigsdorf in Brandenburg in 1931.

Between 1930 and 1934 an artillery firing range in the district was used by the Verein für Raumschiffahrt (Society for Space Travel) for experiments with liquid-fueled rockets. The principal names involved were its leader Rudolf Nebel and other staff members Hermann Oberth and Wernher von Braun.

During World War II, Tegel was the location of a subcamp of the Sachsenhausen concentration camp, and a Nazi prison with several forced labour subcamps in the region.

Tegel was the site of a medium wave broadcasting station from 1933 to 1948. A wire hung in a wooden tower served as an antenna. This tower was demolished as part of the construction of Tegel International Airport at the end of 1948.

== Today ==
Tegel is chiefly known for being the location of Berlin-Tegel Otto Lilienthal, Berlin's former main airport. It has a population of 33,417 and houses the Tegel Prison, one of Germany's largest prisons with about 1,700 inmates as of 2007, known from Alfred Döblin's 1929 novel Berlin Alexanderplatz.

One of Berlin's largest shopping malls Borsighallen is located in the former locomotive manufacturing halls of the Borsigwerke. There is also the Villa Borsig at the shore of Lake Tegel, the former residence of the Borsig family. Today it is a school for future diplomats.

Besides this, Tegel is an extensive residential district with some industry. With the large Lake Tegel, set in woodlands, the locality is also a popular destination for daytrippers. It boasts Berlin's oldest tree, an oak called Dicke Marie ("Fat Mary").

== Transportation ==
Tegel is served by the Berlin S-Bahn line S25 at the station Berlin-Tegel. U-Bahn connection to the inner city is provided by the U6 line with the stations Otisstraße, Holzhauser Straße, Borsigwerke and Alt-Tegel.

== See also ==
- Lake Tegel

== Gallery ==
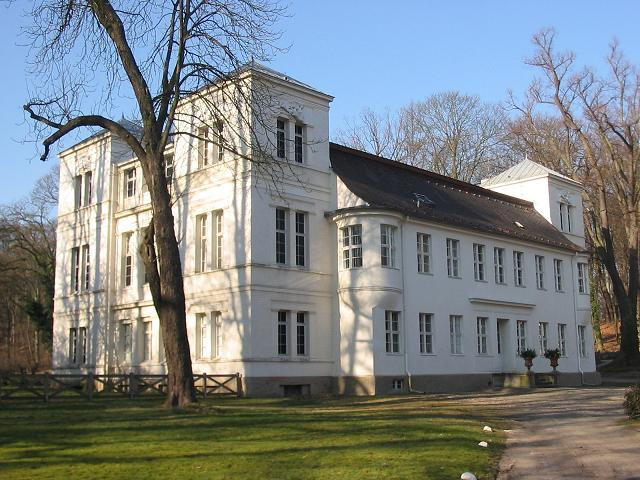
Tegel Palace

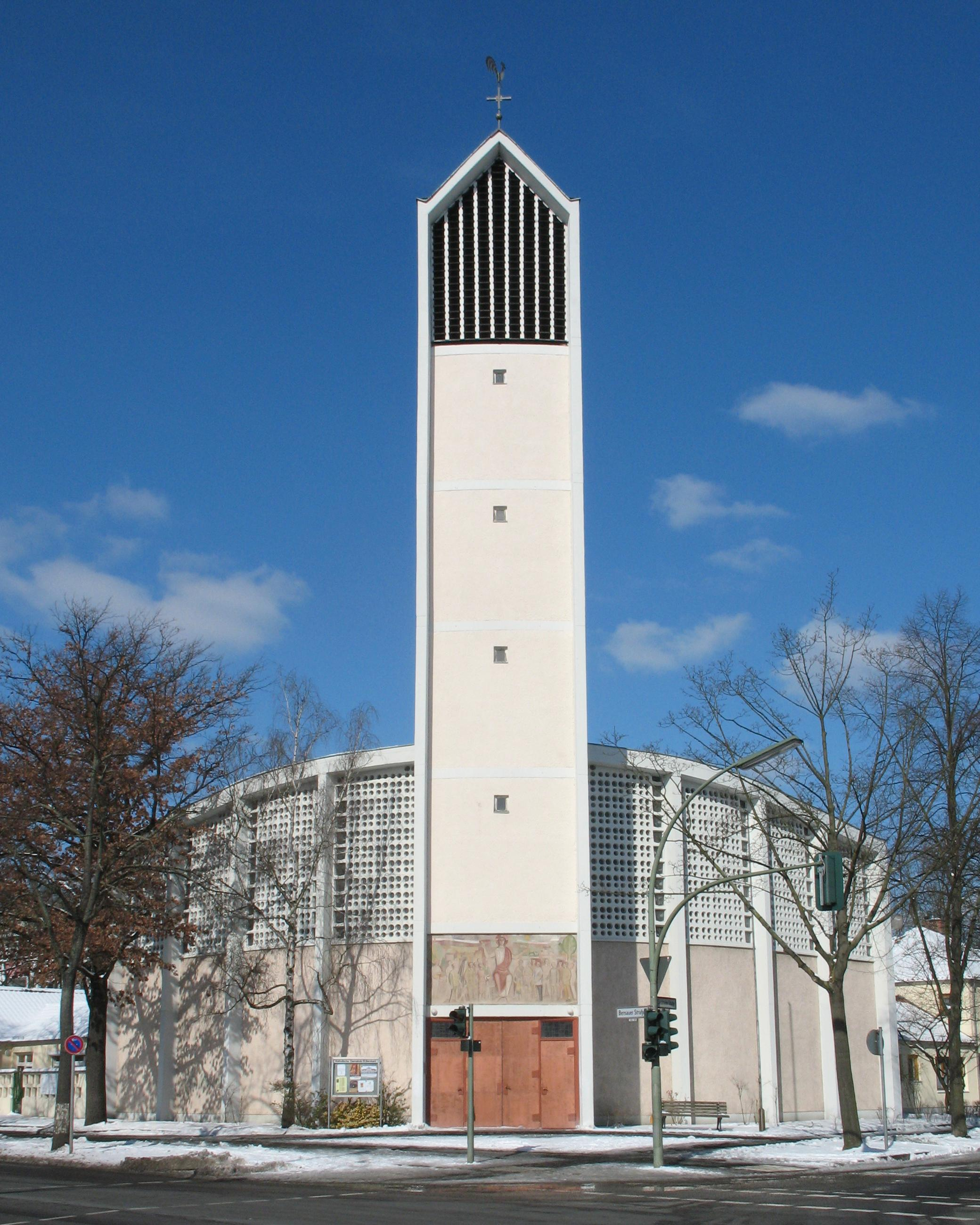
Catholic church St Bernard

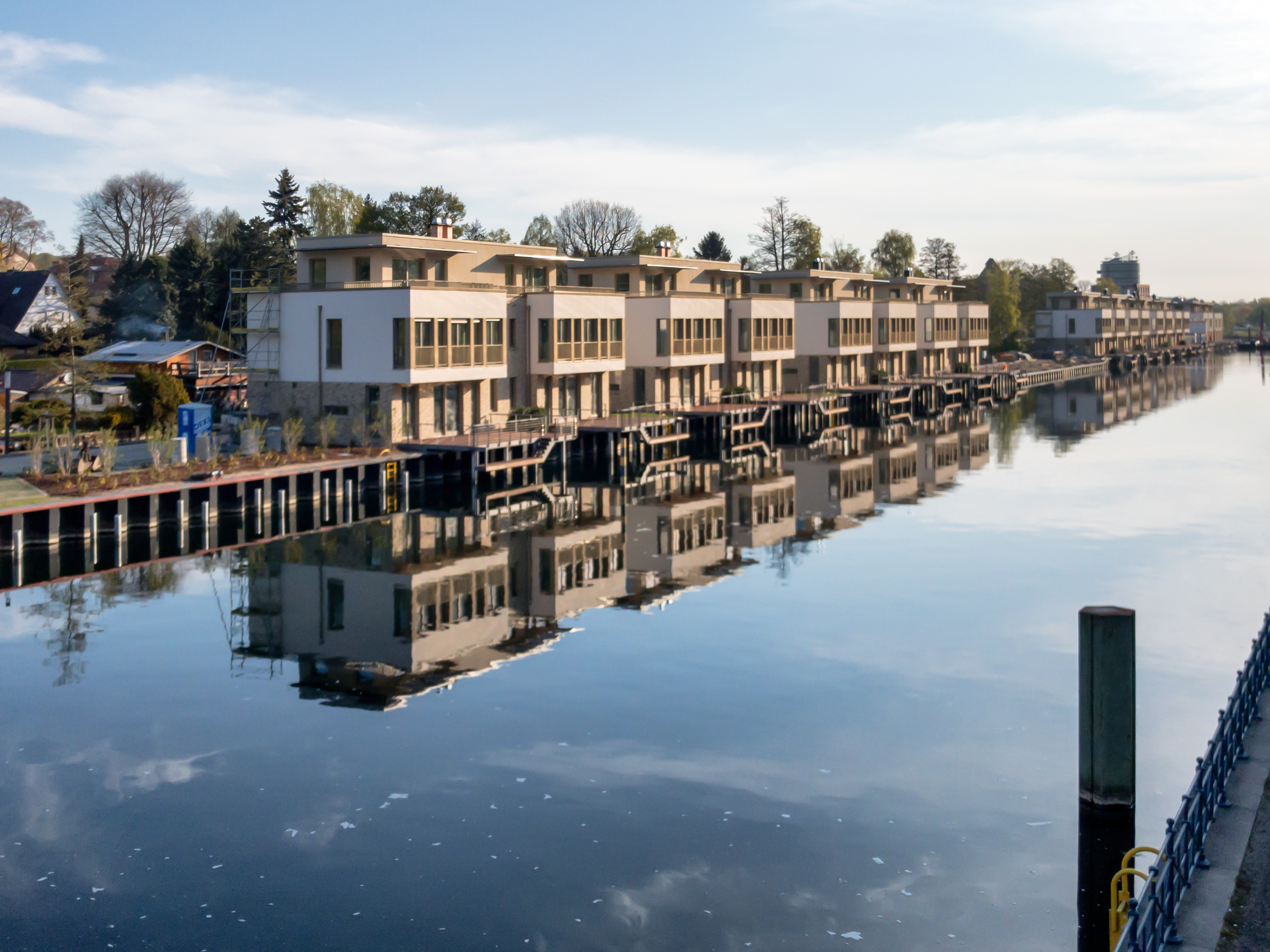
Humboldt island in Tegel

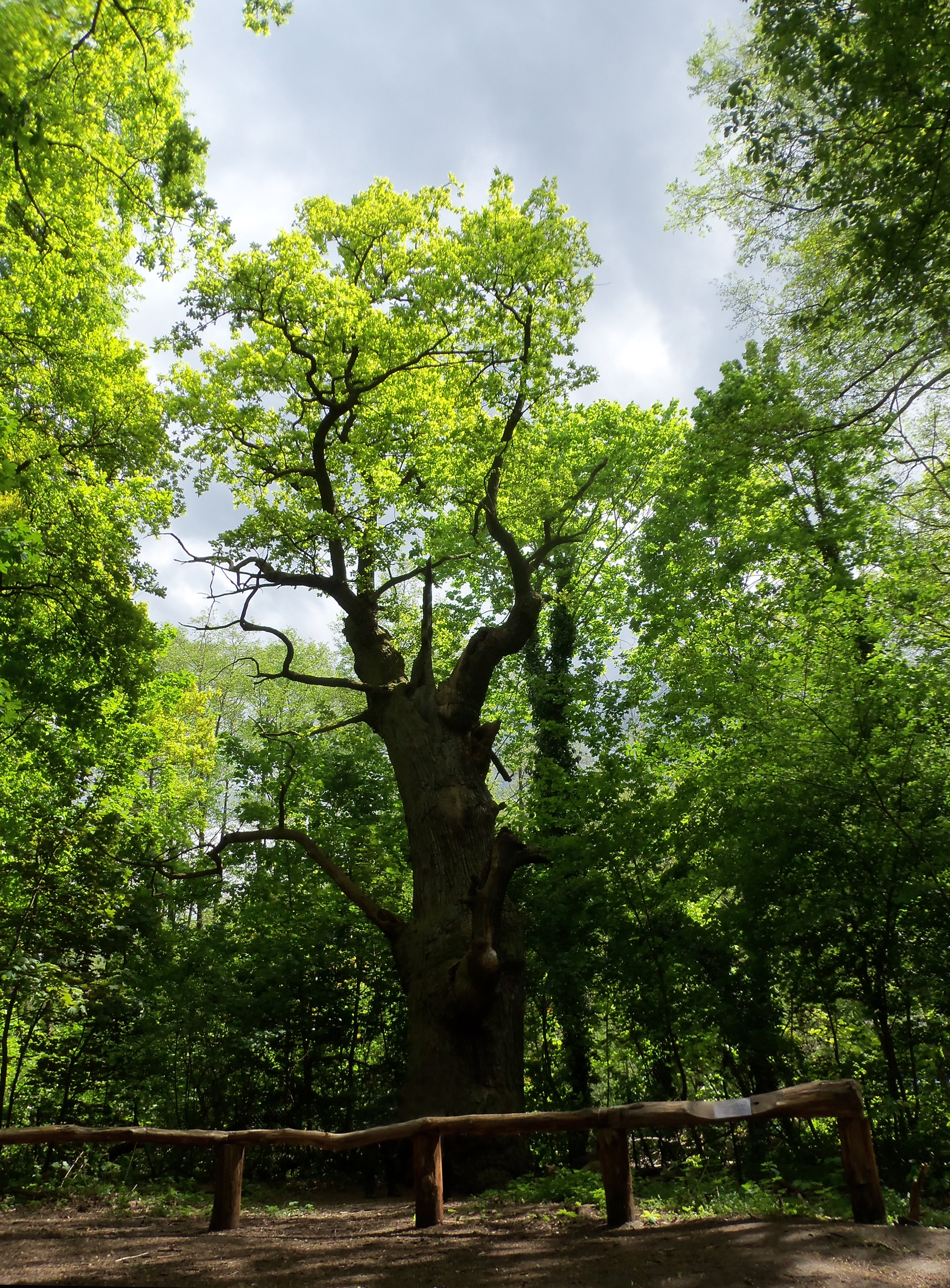
Dicke Marie ("Fat Mary") is a registered natural monument, said to be the oldest tree in Berlin.
