= Wouter van Harselaar =

Dutch politician (1929–2016)

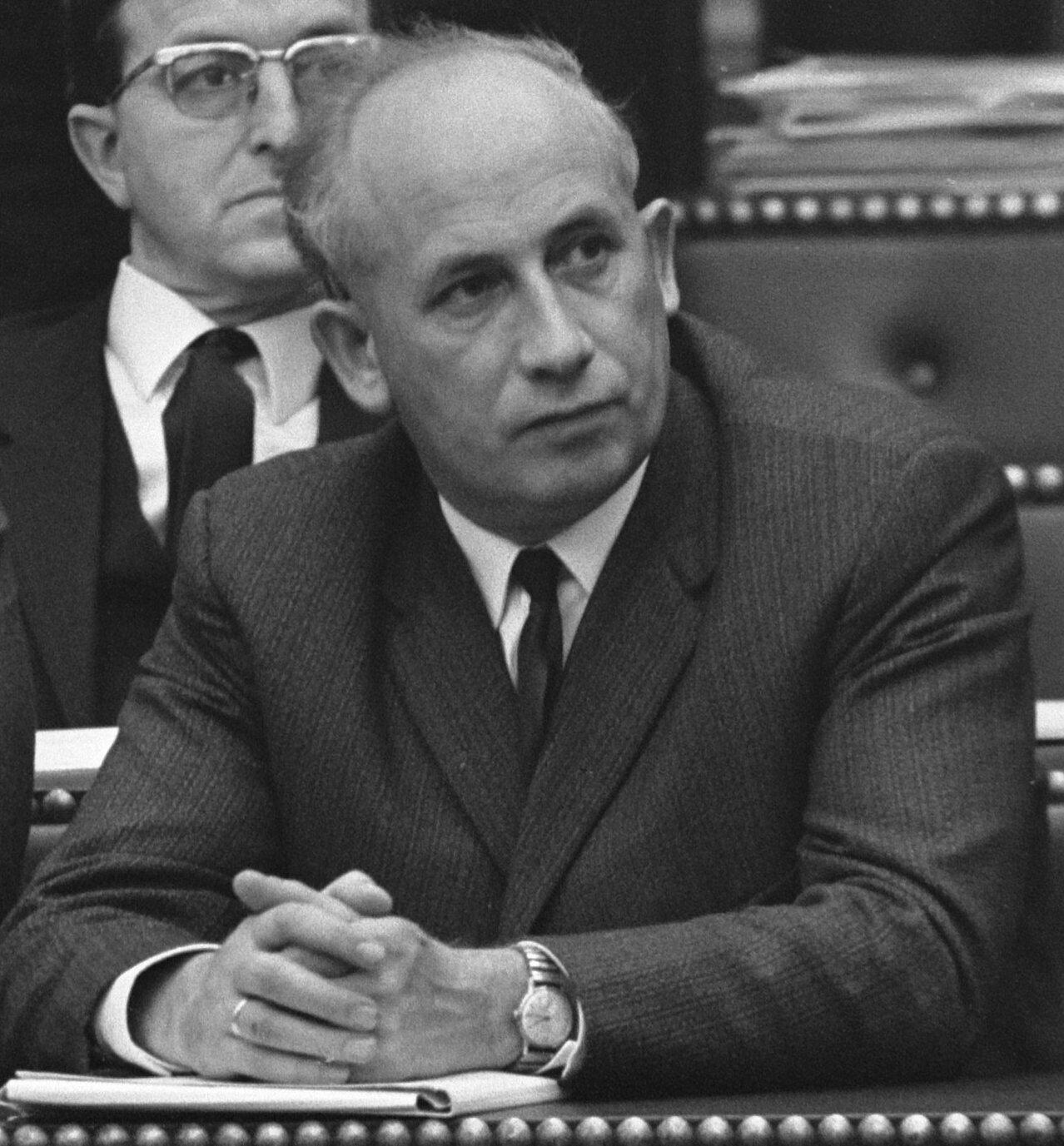
- Van Harselaar in 1968

Member of the House of Representatives
- In office 1 February 1968 – 9 May 1971
- Preceded by: Pieter Leffertstra

Member of the Provincial Council of Utrecht
- In office 2 June 1966 – January 1969

Personal details
- Born: Wouter Marinus van Harselaar; 3 September 1929 Leersum, Netherlands
- Died: 24 April 2016 (aged 86) Amerongen, Netherlands
- Party: Farmers' Party (until 1968); Binding Right (1968 onwards)

Wouter Marinus van Harselaar (Dutch: [ˈʋʌutər vɑn ˈɦaːrsəlaːr]; 3 September 1929 – 24 April 2016) was a Dutch politician. Born in Leersum, he worked as a farmer and administrator in Overberg. He served on the Provincial Council of Utrecht as a member of the Farmers' Party from 1966 until 1969, and he was the party's acting secretary. On 1 February 1968, he replaced Pieter Leffertstra on the House of Representatives. Along with three other Farmers' Party members, he stepped out of the parliamentary group on 27 June 1968, and they established the Binding Right party. Van Harselaar lost his re-election in 1971 as the fourth candidate on the party list, as Binding Right did not secure any seats. His term ended on 9 May 1971. He died on 25 April 2016 in Amerongen aged 86.
