= A12 motorway (Netherlands) =

Motorway in the Netherlands

A12 motorway
- Rijksweg 12
- Location of the A12 motorway

Major junctions
- West end: The Hague
- East end: Lobith

Location
- Country: Kingdom of the Netherlands
- Constituent country: Netherlands
- Provinces: South Holland, Utrecht, Gelderland

Highway system
- Roads in the Netherlands; Motorways; E-roads; Provincial; City routes

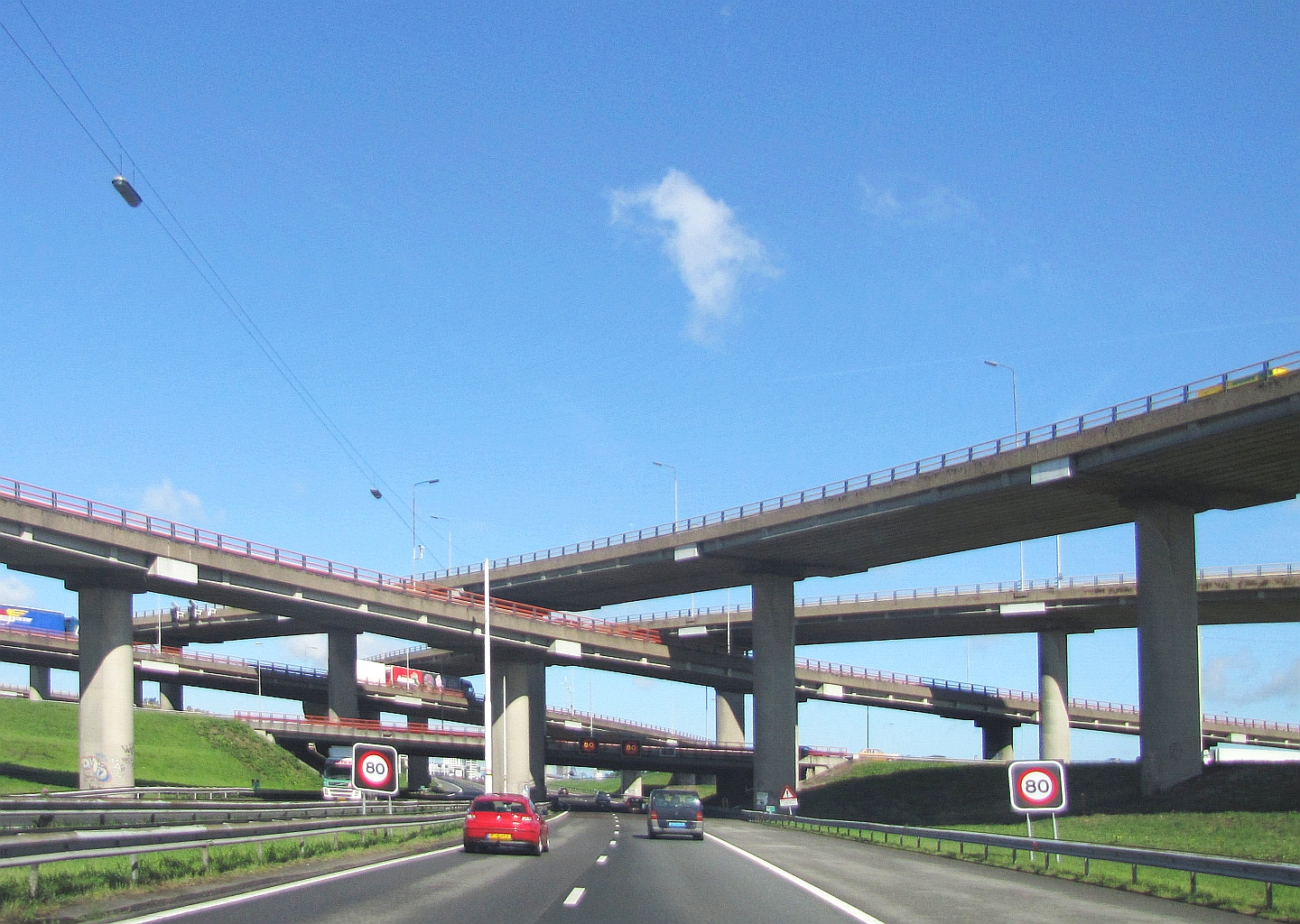
Interchange motorway A12 (km 6, mi 3,7) to A4 motorway via 5 bridges: Knooppunt Prins Clausplein

The A12 motorway is a motorway in the Netherlands. The road connects the city of The Hague with the German border, near Zevenaar, and the German Autobahn BAB 3. On its way, it crosses three Dutch provinces: South Holland, Utrecht, and Gelderland.

== European routes ==
The A12 motorway runs along with parts of three major European routes:

- The European route E30 follows the A12 between interchange Prins Clausplein near The Hague, and interchange Lunetten, just southeast of the city of Utrecht.
- The European route E25 runs along the A12 between interchange Gouwe near Gouda, and interchange Oudenrijn, just southwest of Utrecht.
- The European route E35 follows the route of the A12 from interchange Oudenrijn towards the German border.

== The A12 near The Hague ==
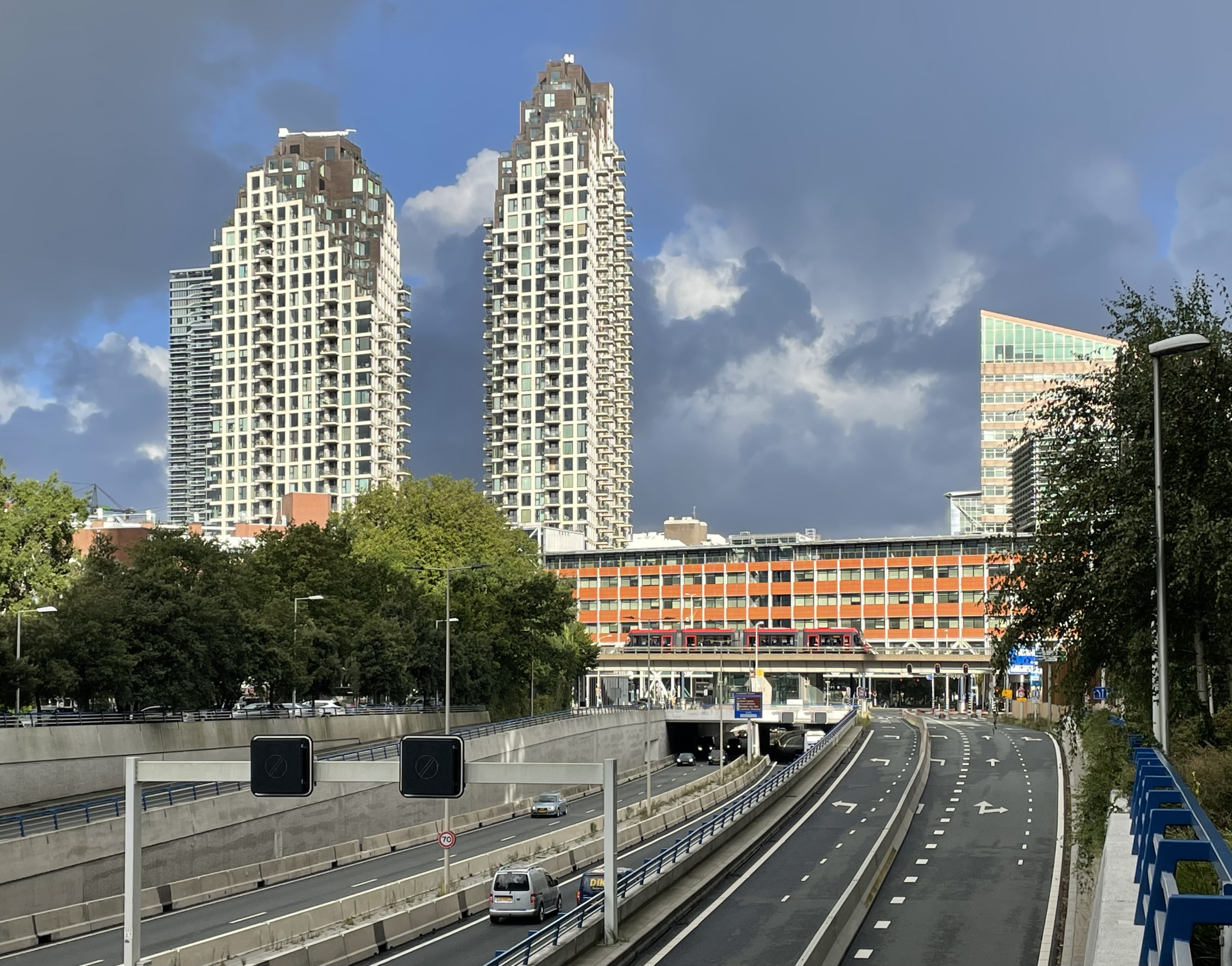
A12 as highway in The Hague.

The section of the A12 road within the city of The Hague (near exits 1, 2 and 3) is actually not a motorway, but a highway. This part of the road, known as the Utrechtsebaan, is too narrow to meet the Dutch requirements for a motorway (for example, it does not have a shoulder), and is therefore a highway with a maximum speed of 70 km/h.

To block local traffic from using this heavily congested part of the road, exits 2 through 4 are built as incomplete exits. These exits only feature westbound exits and eastbound entrances, so they can only be used by interlocal traffic. Local traffic is therefore forced to make use of the available local roads.

== 'Branding' controversy ==
In 2008, a government programme on route branding, under an umbrella project in urban planning, put stickers on all streetlights of the A12, citing efforts to give it a "route 66-like" allure. This plan, dubbed the "regenboogroute" (rainbow route), received news coverage because of its alleged trivial results (stickers on streetlights) and high costs (€120 000).

== A12 blockade ==
The Utrechtsebaan has been the location of numerous blockades by the climate group Extinction Rebellion. With daily blockades taking places since 9 September 2023. They block the road to demand the end of fossil subsidies.

== Exit list ==
Country	Province	Municipality	km	mi	Exit	Destinations	Notes
The Netherlands	South Holland	The Hague	1	0.62	1	N 44 northeast (Benoordenhoutseweg) / S 101 (Zuid Hollandlaan / Benoordenhoutseweg) – Wassenaar, Scheveningen	
The Netherlands	South Holland	The Hague	2	1.2	2	Juliana van Stolberglaan / Prins Bernhardviaduct	Westbound exit and eastbound entrance
The Netherlands	South Holland	The Hague / Leidschendam-Voorburg municipality line	3	1.9	3	Schenkkade	Westbound exit and eastbound entrance only
The Netherlands	South Holland	Leidschendam-Voorburg	5	3.1	4	S 108 southwest (Maanweg) / Prins Bernhardlaan – Rijswijk, Voorburg	Westbound exit and eastbound entrance only
The Netherlands	South Holland	The Hague	6	3.7	—	E19 / E30 / A 4	West end of E 30 overlap
The Netherlands	South Holland	The Hague	7	4.3	5	Donau / Koning Willem-Alexanderviaduct	
The Netherlands	South Holland	Zoetermeer	13	8.1	6	Zuidweg / Afrikaweg	Eastbound exit and westbound entrance only
The Netherlands	South Holland	Zoetermeer	16	9.9	7	N 470	
The Netherlands	South Holland	Lansingerland	18	11	8	N 209	
The Netherlands	South Holland	Zuidplas	23	14	9	N 219	
The Netherlands	South Holland	Waddinxveen	27	17	—	E25 / A 20	West end of E 25 overlap; eastbound entrance and westbound exit only
The Netherlands	South Holland	Waddinxveen	29	18	11	N 452	
The Netherlands	South Holland	Bodegraven-Reeuwijk	33	21	12	N 459	
The Netherlands	South Holland	Bodegraven-Reeuwijk	35	22	12a	N 11	Westbound exit and eastbound entrance only
The Netherlands	South Holland	Bodegraven-Reeuwijk	39	24	13	Molendijk / Verlengde Tuurluur	
The Netherlands	Utrecht	Woerden	46	29	14	N 204	
The Netherlands	Utrecht	Woerden	51	32	14a	N 419	
The Netherlands	Utrecht	Utrecht	54	34	15	N 198 / N 228	
The Netherlands	Utrecht	Utrecht	57	35	—	E25 / E35 / A 2	East end of E 25 overlap; west end of E 35 overlap
The Netherlands	Utrecht	Utrecht	59	37	16	Papendorpseweg	
The Netherlands	Amsterdam–Rhine Canal				Galecopperbrug		
The Netherlands	Utrecht	Utrecht	60	37	17	Europalaan	
The Netherlands	Utrecht	Utrecht	61	38	18	N 408 south (Laagravenseweg) / Waterlinieweg – Nieuwegein, Utrecht	
The Netherlands	Utrecht	Utrecht	62	39	—	E30 / E311 / A 27	East end of E 30 overlap
The Netherlands	Utrecht	Bunnik			De Forten rest area Eastbound exit and entrance only		
The Netherlands	Utrecht	Bunnik	68	42	19	N 229 south (Schoudermantel) / Baan van Fectio – Bunnik, Odijk	
The Netherlands	Utrecht	Utrechtse Heuvelrug	71	44	20	N 225 east (Hoofdstraat) – Driebergen, Zeist	
The Netherlands	Utrecht	Utrechtse Heuvelrug	77	48	21	N 227 – Maarn, Doorn	Eastbound exit and westbound entrance only
The Netherlands	Utrecht	Utrechtse Heuvelrug	81	50	22	N 226 (Woudenbergseweg) – Maarsbergen, Woudenberg, Leersum	
The Netherlands	Utrecht	Utrechtse Heuvelrug			Bloemheuvel rest area eastbound Oudenhorst rest area westbound		
The Netherlands	Utrecht	Renswoude / Veenendaal municipality line	92	57	23	N 418 north (Nieuweweg-Noord) / Rondweg-West – Veenendaal	
The Netherlands	Utrecht / Gelderland province line	Veenendaal / Ede municipality line	104	65	23a	N 233 south (Rondweg-Oost) / Rondweg De Klomp – Veenendaal	
The Netherlands	Gelderland	Ede	107	66	—	A 30 north – Ede	
The Netherlands	Gelderland	Ede	109	68	24	N 781 south (Dr. W. Dreeslaan) – Ede, Bennekom	
The Netherlands	Gelderland	Ede			Buunderkamp rest area eastbound 't Ginkelse Zand rest area westbound		
The Netherlands	Gelderland	Ede	120	75	25	N 224 (Verlengde Arnhemseweg / Amsterdamseweg) – Ede, Arnhem	
The Netherlands	Gelderland	Arnhem	121	75	—	A 50 south – Heelsum	West end of A50 overlap
The Netherlands	Gelderland	Arnhem			De Schaars rest area Westbound exit and entrance only		
The Netherlands	Gelderland	Arnhem	128	80	—	A 50 north (Delhuijzenweg) – Beekbergen	East end of A50 overlap
The Netherlands	Gelderland	Arnhem	129	80	26	N 784 (Apeldoornseweg) – Arnhem	
The Netherlands	Gelderland	Arnhem	134	83	—	A 348 east (IJsselweg) / N 325 west (IJsseloordweg) – Rheden, Arnhem	
The Netherlands	IJssel				IJsselbrug		
The Netherlands	Gelderland	Duiven	136	85	27	N 338 east (Rivierweg) – Lathum, Westervoort	
The Netherlands	Gelderland	Duiven	138	86	28	N 810 south (Noordsingel) – Duiven	
The Netherlands	Gelderland	Duiven			Oudbroeken rest area eastbound Aalburgen rest area westbound		
The Netherlands	Gelderland	Zevenaar	143	89	29	N 813 east (Nieuwe Steeg / Tatelaarsweg) / N 336 (Doesburgseweg) – Didam, Zevenaar	
The Netherlands	Gelderland	Zevenaar	147	91	—	A 18 east – Didam	Eastbound exit and westbound entrance only
The Netherlands	Gelderland	Zevenaar	149	93	30	N 812 (Beekseweg) – Babberich, Beek	
The Netherlands	Gelderland	Zevenaar			2theloo rest area Northbound exit and entrance only		
The Netherlands	Gelderland	Zevenaar			—	E35 / A 3 east – Babberich, Elten	Border with Germany; this road continues as the German A 3; east end of E 35 overlap
1.000 mi = 1.609 km; 1.000 km = 0.621 mi: Concurrency terminus; Incomplete access
