= Utrecht Hill Ridge =

Coordinates: 52°3′20.42″N 5°21′7.08″E

Utrecht Hill Ridge (Dutch: Utrechtse Heuvelrug) is a ridge of low sandhills that stretches in a direction from southeast to northwest over the Dutch province of Utrecht and over a part of North Holland. The total length of the region is about 50 km. It covers an area of approximately 23,000 hectares. The part of the ridge in North Holland is commonly called Het Gooi in Dutch, the Gooi (area) in English.

Utrecht Hill Ridge

On the southeastern side the ridge rises sharply from the valley of the Nederrijn (Lower Rhine). Here the famous Grebbeberg (Grebbe Mountain) forms a landmark (52 m high) where the Battle of the Grebbeberg took place in 1940 as an important part of Battle of the Netherlands. The highest peak of the ridge is the Amerongse Berg (Amerongen Mountain) of 68 m. On the northern side the ridge continues to the shores of the Gooimeer (Lake Gooi).

The Utrecht Hill Ridge was created 150,000 years ago as a push moraine in the Saalian, the ice age preceding the last. Before that time the rivers Rhine and Meuse flowed more northerly, and created deposits of sand. The glaciers pushed these deposits in a southern and western direction.

After the last Ice Age the area got overgrown with woods. In historical times the population increased and woodlands were cleared for cattle and sheep. The Utrecht Hill Ridge was then largely covered with heather and sand drifts. In the 19th and 20th centuries large parts of the ridge were replanted with trees.

The Utrecht Hill Ridge has given name to:

- Utrechtse Heuvelrug, a municipality in the southern part of the ridge, that was formed 1 January 2006 as a combination of the former municipalities of Amerongen, Doorn, Driebergen-Rijsenburg, Leersum, and Maarn.
- Utrechtse Heuvelrug National Park, a national park in the southern part of the region, that was established 11 October 2003. It covers 6,000 hectares.

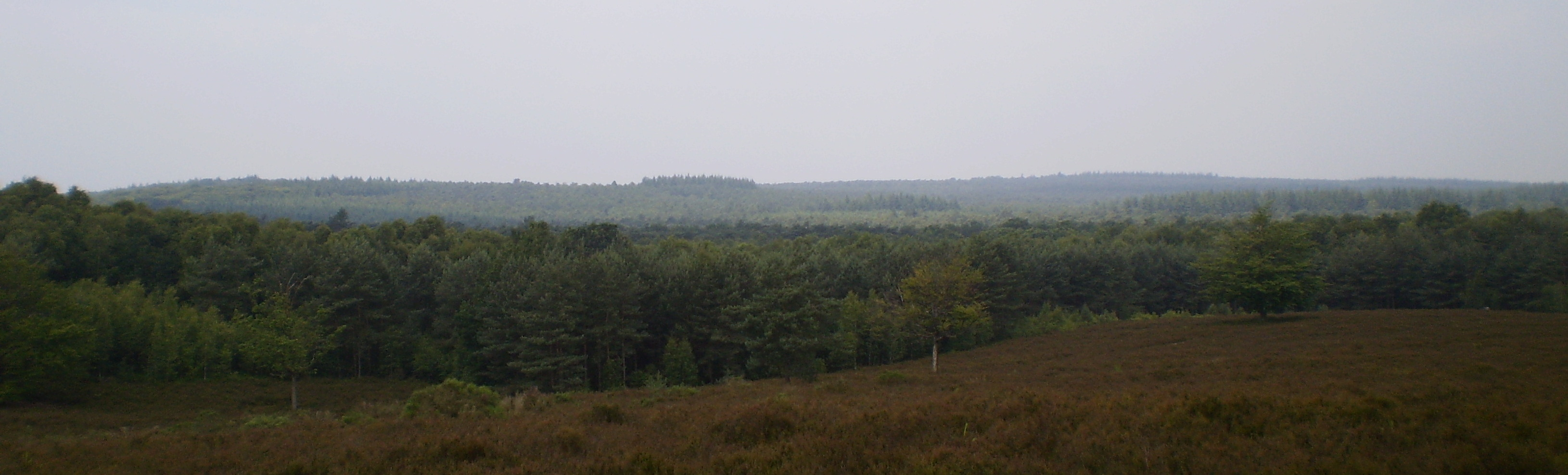
Utrecht Hill Ridge as seen from the Elsterberg
