= Driebergen =

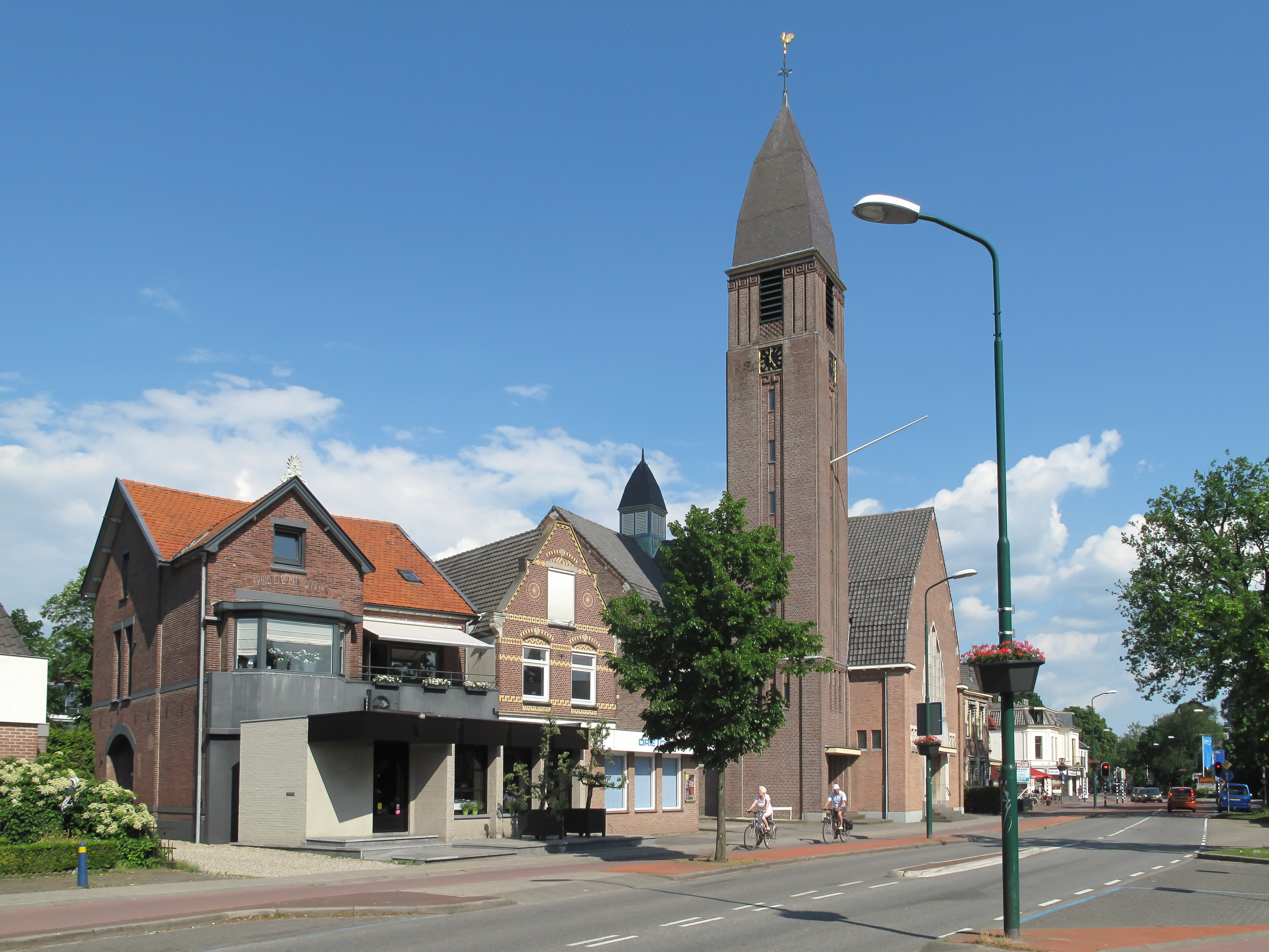
- Driebergen, church (de Grote Kerk) in the street

- Coat of arms

- Location in the Netherlands Driebergen (Utrecht (province))
- Coordinates: 52°3′0″N 5°17′0″E
- Country: Netherlands
- Province: Utrecht
- Municipality: Utrechtse Heuvelrug

Driebergen is a former village and municipality in the Dutch province of Utrecht. It is first mentioned as Thriberghen in 1159. The former municipality of Driebergen existed until 1931, when it merged with Rijsenburg, to create the new municipality of Driebergen-Rijsenburg. In later years, due to growth of the villages of Driebergen and Rijsenburg, the villages themselves also merged, to become the single town of Driebergen-Rijsenburg. Since 2006, Driebergen-Rijsenburg has been part of the new municipality of Utrechtse Heuvelrug. Driebergen-Rijsenburg also houses the Driebergen Forest and Rijsenburg Forest in which the Heidetuin ('heather garden') is also located.

== Transport ==
- Driebergen-Zeist railway station
