= Marianne Burgman =

Dutch politician (1953–2021)

Mayor of Maarn
- In office 1995–2002
- Preceded by: Let de Stigter-Huising
- Succeeded by: Aat de Jonge

Acting Mayor of Bunnik
- In office 1 April 2000 – 1 November 2000
- Preceded by: Koos Janssen
- Succeeded by: Hélène van Rijnbach-de Groot

Mayor of De Ronde Venen
- In office 2002–2011
- Preceded by: Dick Boogaard
- Succeeded by: Albertine van Vliet-Kuiper (interim)

Personal details
- Born: 14 May 1953
- Died: 15 May 2021 (aged 68)
- Party: VVD

Marianne Burgman (14 May 1953 – 15 May 2021) was a Dutch politician. A member of the People's Party for Freedom and Democracy, she served as Mayor of Maarn, Bunnik, and De Ronde Venen.

== Biography ==
Burgman became Mayor of Maarn in 1995 and served until 2002, when the municipality was merged into Utrechtse Heuvelrug. She was Acting Mayor of Bunnik from 1 April to 1 November 2000 before becoming Mayor of De Ronde Venen in 2002. She began serving as Acting Mayor in 2011, during the merger between De Ronde Venen and Abcoude. She was succeeded by Albertine van Vliet-Kuiper.

Marianne Burgman died on 15 May 2021 at the age of 68 following a short illness.
