= Overberg, Netherlands =

Overberg
- Village
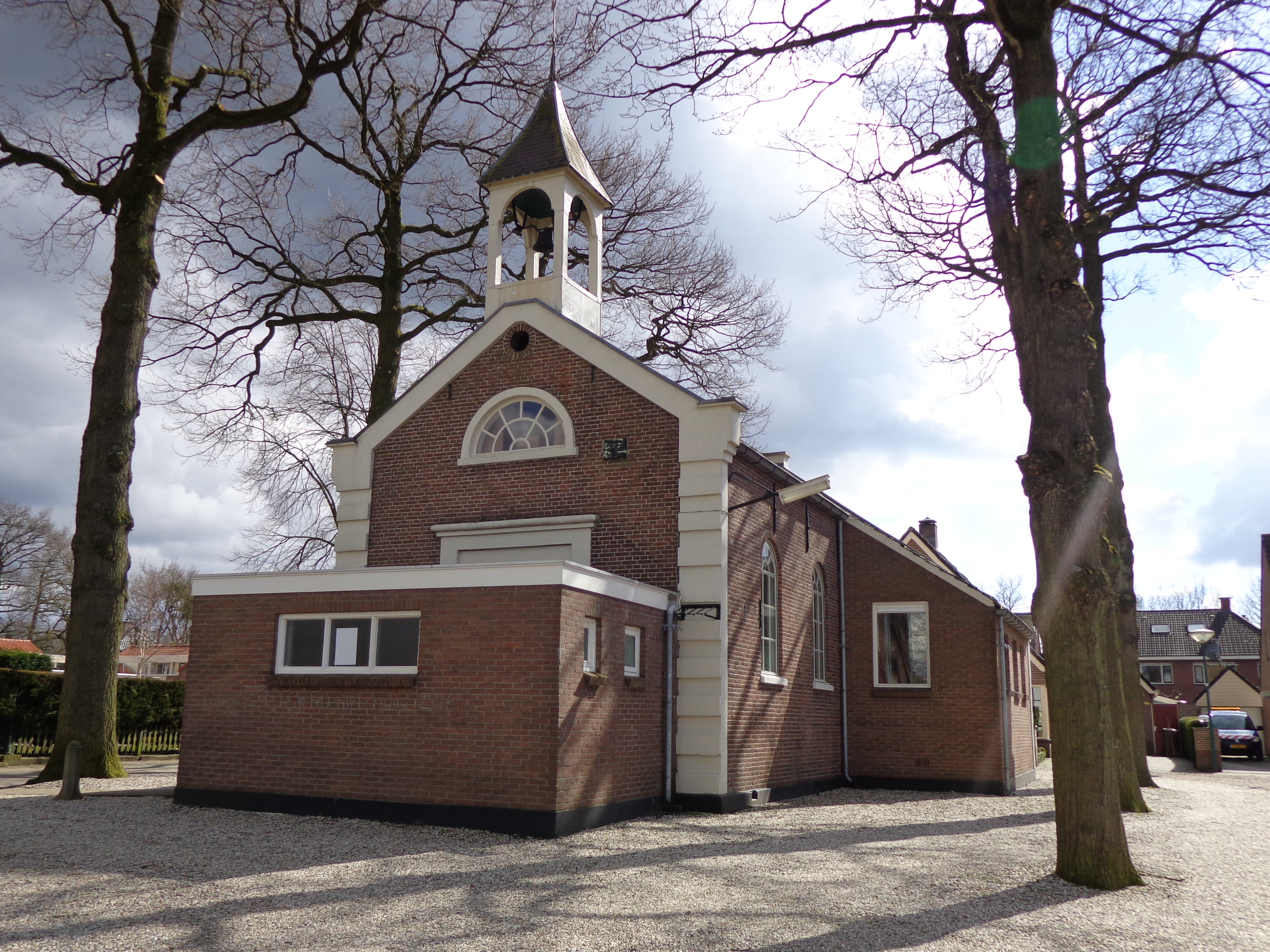
- Efratha Church

- Location in the Netherlands Overberg (Netherlands)
- Coordinates: 52°2′21″N 5°29′49″E
- Country: Netherlands
- Province: Utrecht
- Municipality: Utrechtse Heuvelrug

Area
  - Total: 9.09 km^{2} (3.51 sq mi)
- Elevation: 8 m (26 ft)

Population (2021)
  - Total: 1,570
  - Density: 173/km^{2} (447/sq mi)
- Time zone: UTC+1 (CET)
  - Summer (DST): UTC+2 (CEST)
- Postal code: 3959
- Dialing code: 0343
- Major roads: A12

Overberg is a village in the Dutch province of Utrecht. It is a part of the municipality of Utrechtse Heuvelrug. It is located on both sides of the Utrecht-Rhenen railway line, but has no station. It is around 5 km west of the centre of Veenendaal, and 25 km east of the city of Utrecht.

The village was first mentioned in 1846 as Overberg, and means "the other side of the hill (Amerongse Berg)". In 1873, the Efratha Church and school were built.

== Gallery ==
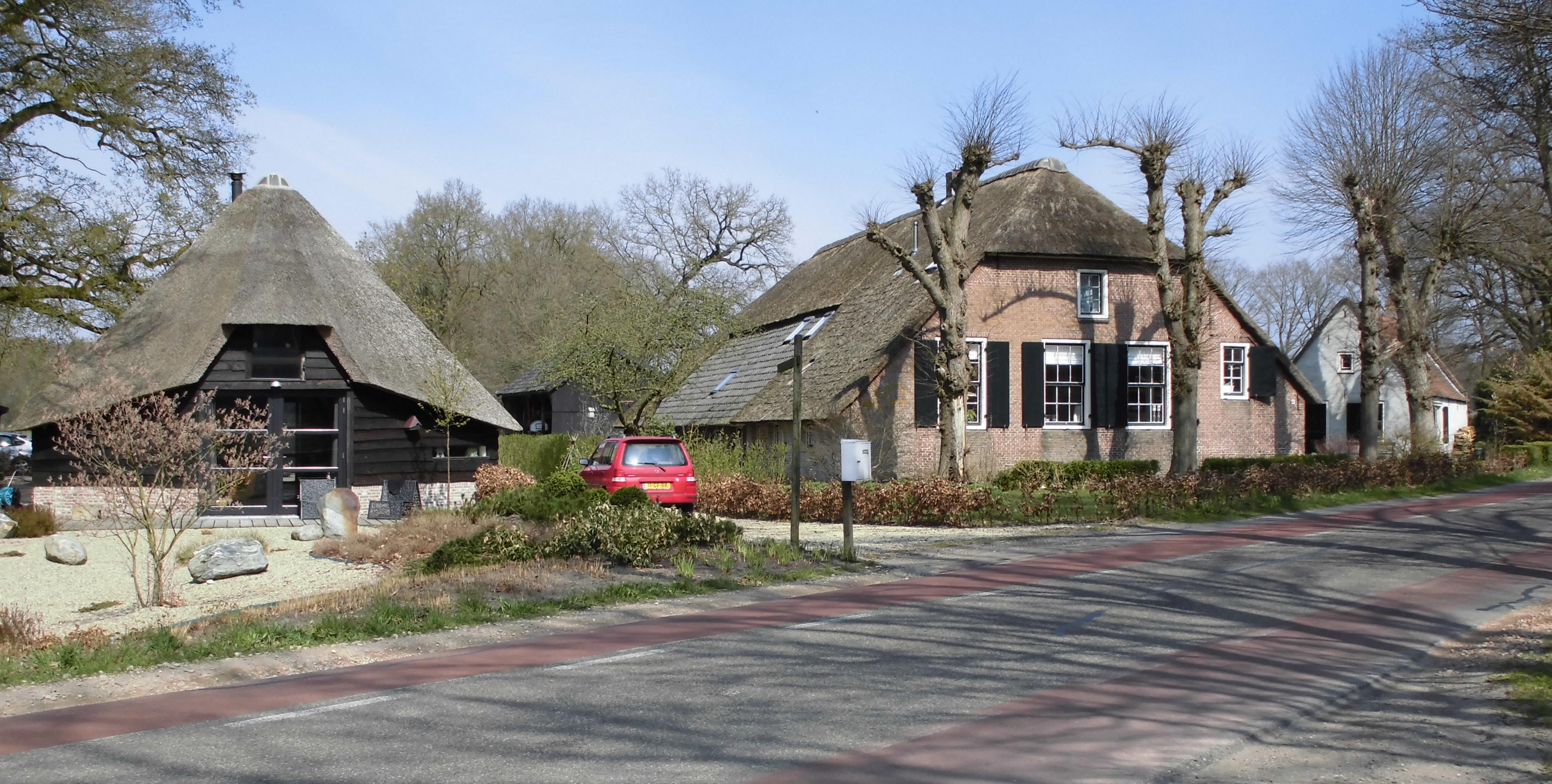
Farm in Overberg

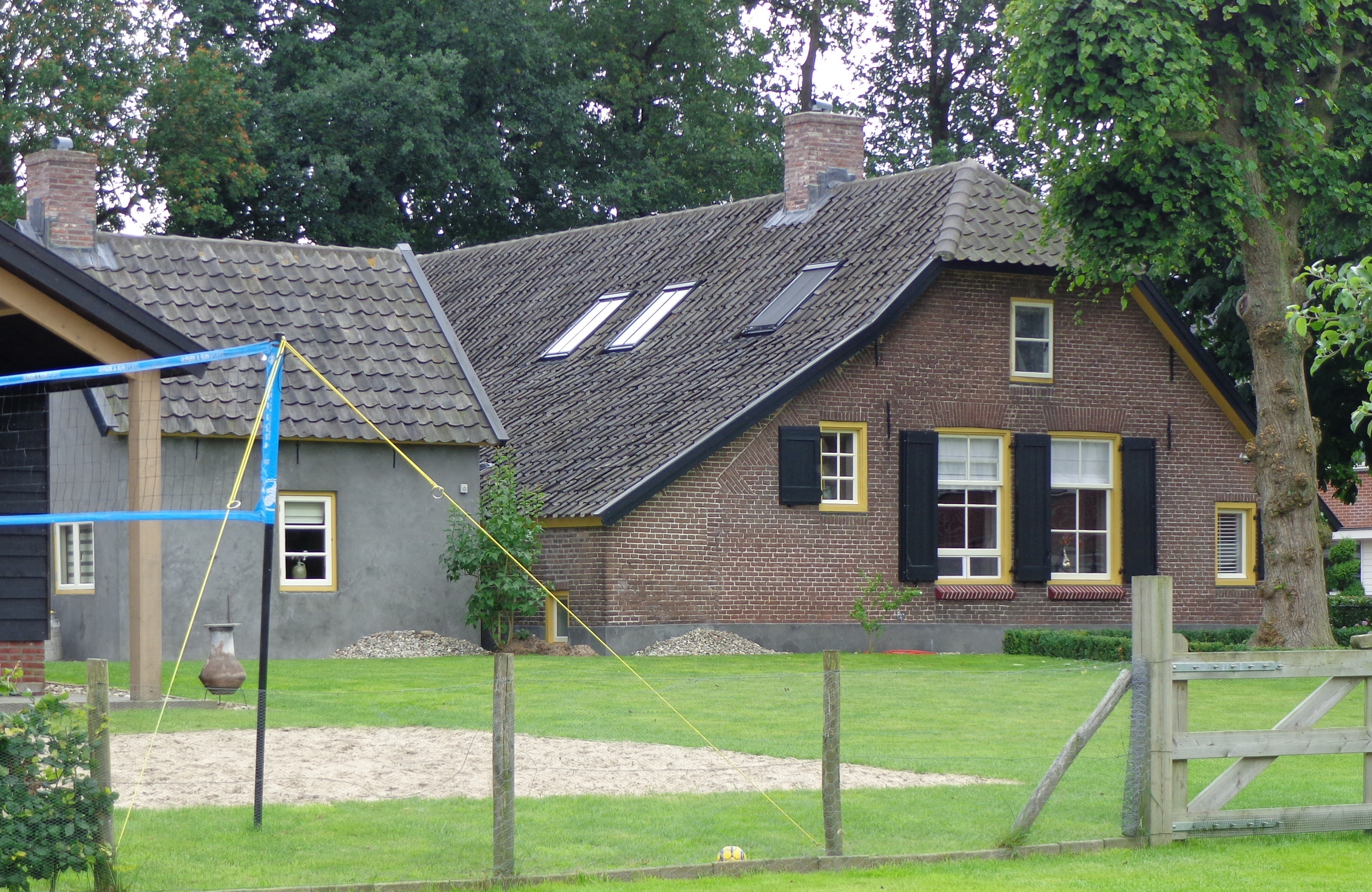
Farm in Overberg

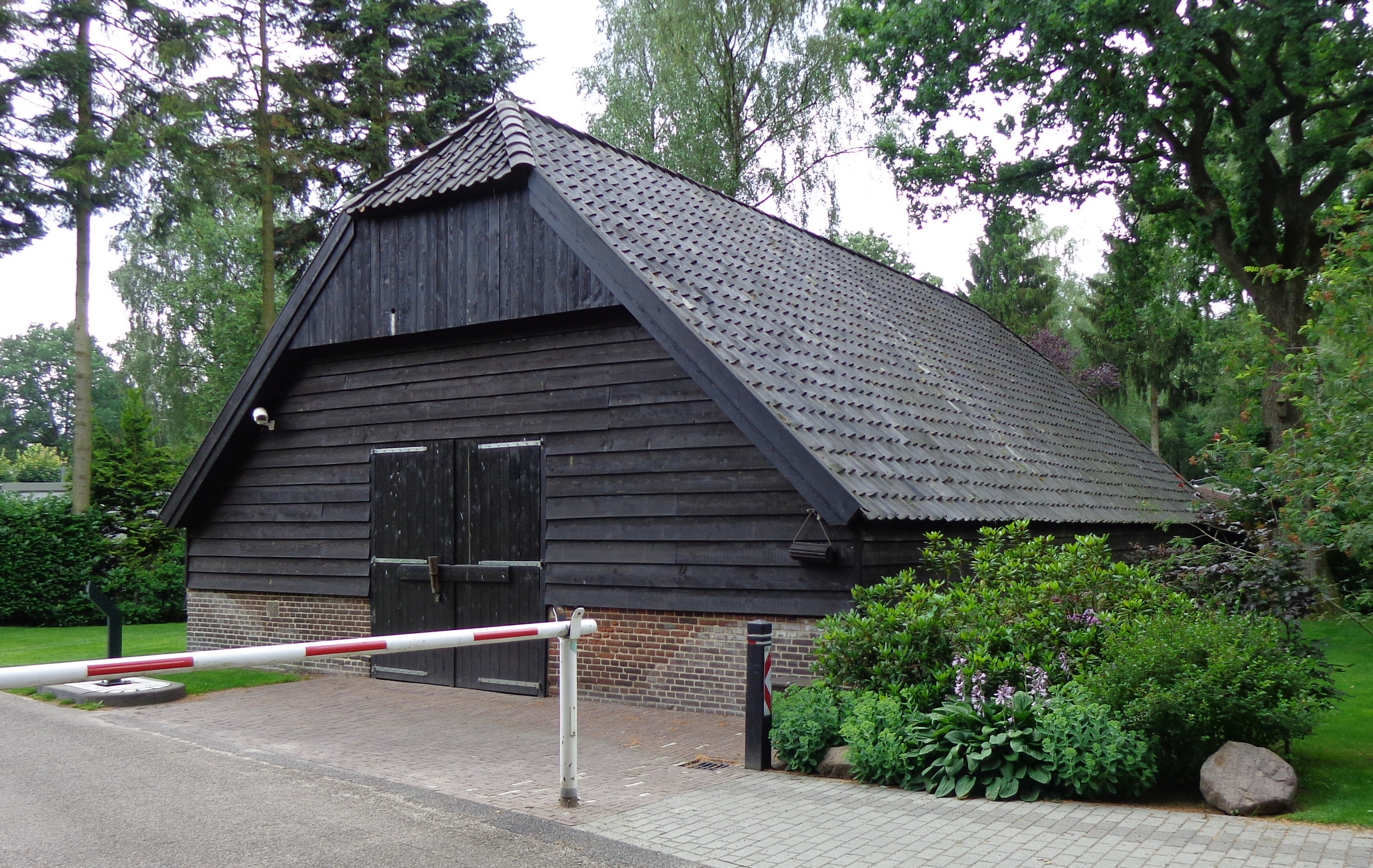
Sheep pen

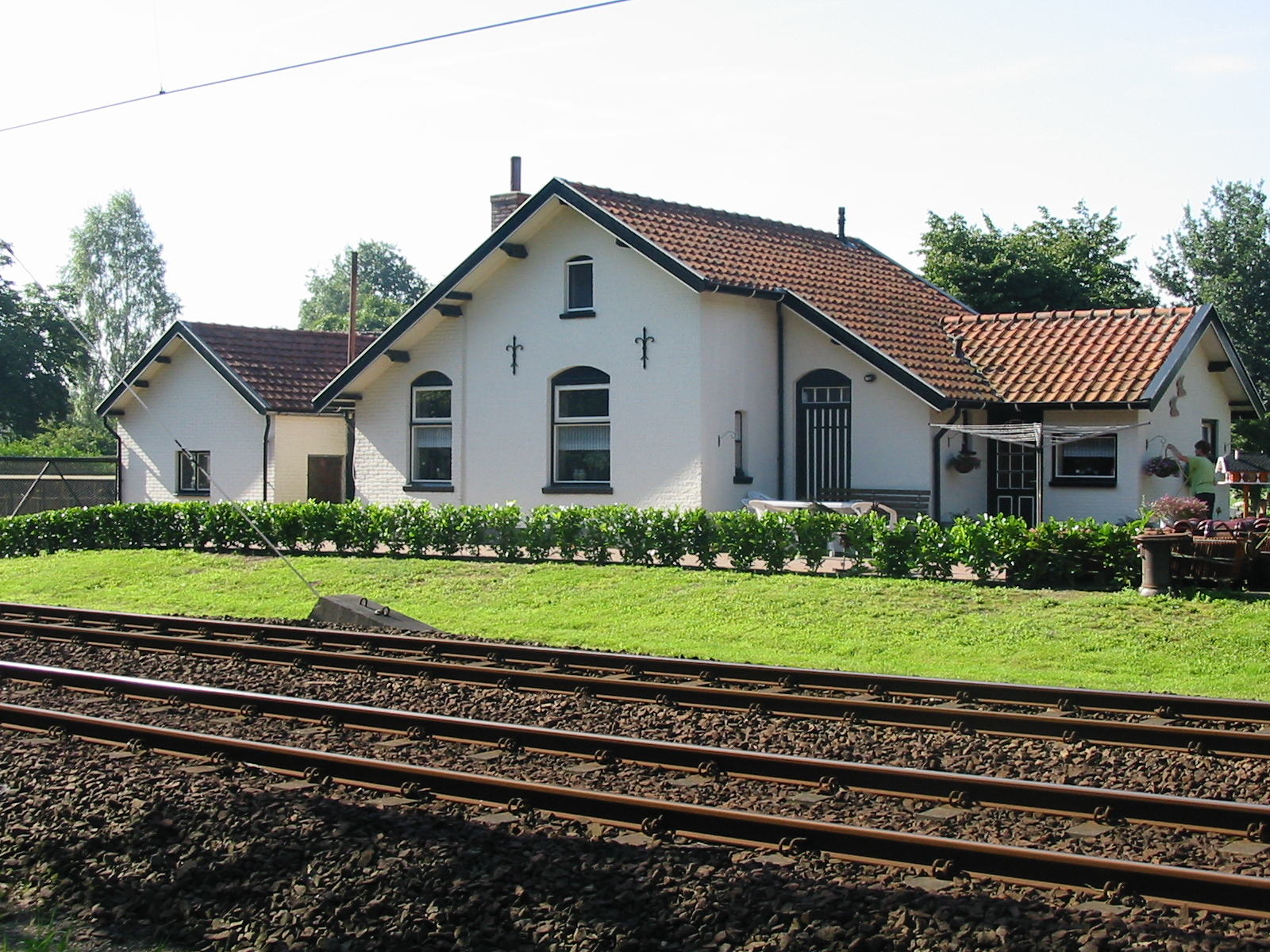
Former railway guard house
