= Burgman =

Burgman is a surname. Notable people with the surname include:

- Herbert John Burgman (1894–1953), American Nazi collaborator and propagandist
- Marianne Burgman (1953–2021), Dutch politician
- Mark Burgman (born 1956), Australian ecologist
- Robert Burgman (born 1970), American climate scientist

== See also ==
- Bergman
- Suzuki Burgman, series of scooters
