= Driebergen forest =

Forest in Utrecht, Netherlands

- IUCN category VI (protected area with sustainable use of natural resources)
- Location: Utrechtse Heuvelrug
- Nearest city: Driebergen-Rijsenburg
- Coordinates: 52°3′45″N 5°17′53.9″E

The Driebergen forest (Dutch: Driebergse bos) is a nature reserve near Driebergen-Rijsenburg in the Dutch province of Utrecht.

The forest lies south of the A12 and the railway Utrecht-Arnhem and runs to the built-up area of Driebergen-Rijsenburg at Willem van Abcoudelaan, Wetstein Pfisterlaan and Schellingerlaan. On the west side lies the forest plot of the Friends of Nassau-Odijkhof foundation, and on the east side, there is the cemetery on the Traaij. On the north side of the railroad line lies nature reserve Bornia. The 25-hectare forest merges into the Rijsenburgsebos.

The Driebergen forest has a high cultural-historical value. It is a remnant of the Star Forest Sper en Dal, created in the mid-18th century by the then owners of Buitenplaats Sparrendaal. The pen drawing by A. Verryk & Son from 1758 (on display in Buitenplaats Sparrendaal) depicts the star forest.

The Drieberg forest was owned by the Diederichs family in the nineteenth century. In 1899 the Kraaysteeg was renamed Diederichslaan. After 1918 the Drieberg forest around the Acacia pond and the Koekenpan (spring system "De Zwoer") was sold to the Indian-born C.T.F.T Thurkow, commissioner of the culture mines. Consequently, in the twentieth century the forest was called "Thurkow's forest". The forest contains a heath field.

The spring system "De Zwoer" has two springheads (moat ponds); De Pannenkoek and the Acaciavijver. The Sixteen Faces used to exist near the Acacia Pond, named after the forest paths that converged here. The spring system provided Buitenplaats Sparrendaal with (drinking) water. The spring streams go from the Driebergen forest via the Driebergen Noord neighborhood, the Bosstraat and the Seminary grounds to Buitenplaats Sparrendaal.
