= Utrechtse Heuvelrug National Park =

National park in the Netherlands

- Nationaal Park Utrechtse Heuvelrug
- IUCN category II (national park)
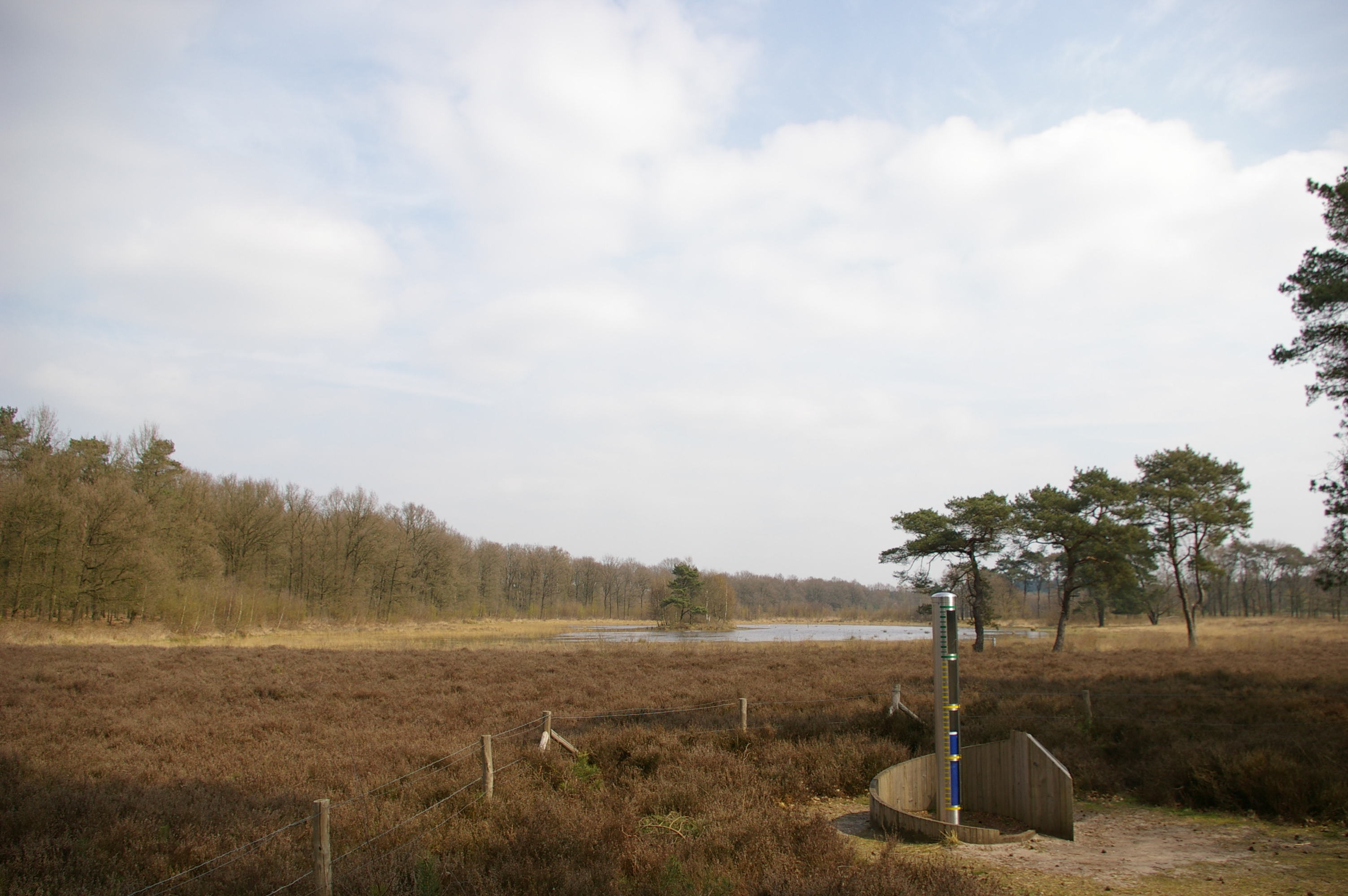

- Location within Netherlands
- Location: Utrecht Province, Netherlands
- Nearest city: Veenendaal
- Coordinates: 52.025°N 5.437°E
- Area: 10,000 ha (25,000 acres)
- Established: 2003+2013
- Website: www.np-utrechtseheuvelrug.nl/documents/home.xml

Utrechtse Heuvelrug National Park (literally Utrecht Hill Ridge National Park) is a national park in the Dutch province of Utrecht. It covers the southern part of the Utrecht Hill Ridge. When it was founded in 2003 the park covered 6,000 ha (15,000 acres) of heathlands, shifting sands, forests, grass lands and floodplains. In 2013 the park was extended to 10,000 ha (25,000 acres), adding the area north of highway A12 when the ecoduct Mollebos was realized. The most striking landscape feature is the glacial ridge after which the park is named.

== Landscape and history ==
The landscape of the park dates from the next-to-last ice age, Saalien. Afterwards the land was reshaped by the drifting sands, the rivers and the effects of human occupation. Intensive land use, reforestation and the building of country estates transformed the appearance of the Utrechtse Heuvelrug over the centuries. The history of the region is reflected in the wide variety of soil types, relief and land use.

== Flora and fauna ==
The Utrechtse Heuvelrug is the second largest forest area in the Netherlands. In the forest some relics from the original post-glacial forests can be found, including oak and beech. In the park several mustelid species can be found, such as the European badger (Meles meles) and the European pine marten (Martes martes). There are more than 100 bird species living in the park, among which the black woodpecker, the raven and the bluethroat. In the marshy region near Amerongen castle the little bittern is a rare species, as well as rare plants like sundew and marsh gentian. In addition, several amphibian, reptile, bat, butterflies and dragonflies species are living in the region.

== Management ==
Responsible for the management of the park are Staatsbosbeheer, the private provincial nature conservation organization Het Utrechts Landschap and the national private organization for nature management Natuurmonumenten, together with many private land owners. Management plans are made together with these owners, the authorities and stakeholders.

One of the main aims of management is countering the ecological fragmentation, as a result of the many roads in the area. To do so, several ecoducts and other fauna passageways are constructed or planned to connect the nature reserves. In addition to removing fencing and creating green corridors, this should enable the migration of flora and fauna, including large animals such as deer.

== Recreation ==
In the national park there are trails designated for walking, biking and horse riding, as well as restaurants, hotels and campsites.

Places to visit nearby include castles, historic villages and cities, country houses, tobacco barns and sheepfolds.
