= Darthuizen =

- Hamlet
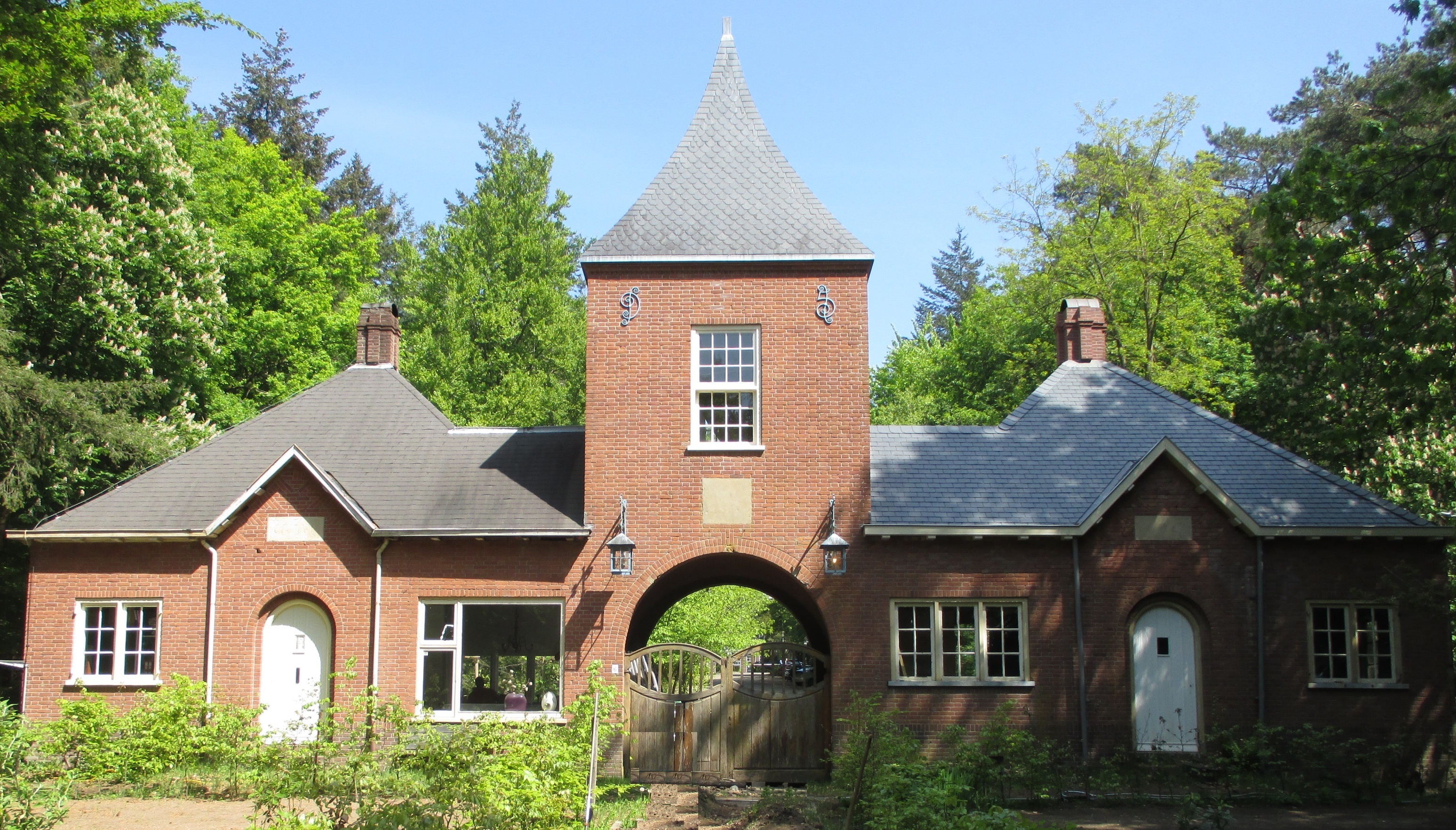
- Gate house

- Location in the Netherlands Darthuizen (Netherlands)
- Coordinates: 52°0′45″N 5°23′53″E
- Country: Netherlands
- Province: Utrecht
- Municipality: Utrechtse Heuvelrug

Area
  - Total: 6.84 km^{2} (2.64 sq mi)

Population (2021)
  - Total: 295
  - Density: 43.1/km^{2} (112/sq mi)
- Time zone: UTC+1 (CET)
  - Summer (DST): UTC+2 (CEST)
- Postal code: 3956
- Dialing code: 0343

Darthuizen is a hamlet in the Dutch municipality of Utrechtse Heuvelrug.

From 1818 to 1857, Darthuizen was a separate municipality. On 8 June 1857, it merged into the municipality of Leersum.

The hamlet was first mentioned in 1253 as Derthesen. The etymology is unclear. The postal authorities have placed it under Leersum. Since 2013, it has place name signs. In 1840, it was home to 228 people. Nowadays, it consists of about 40 houses.

== Gallery ==
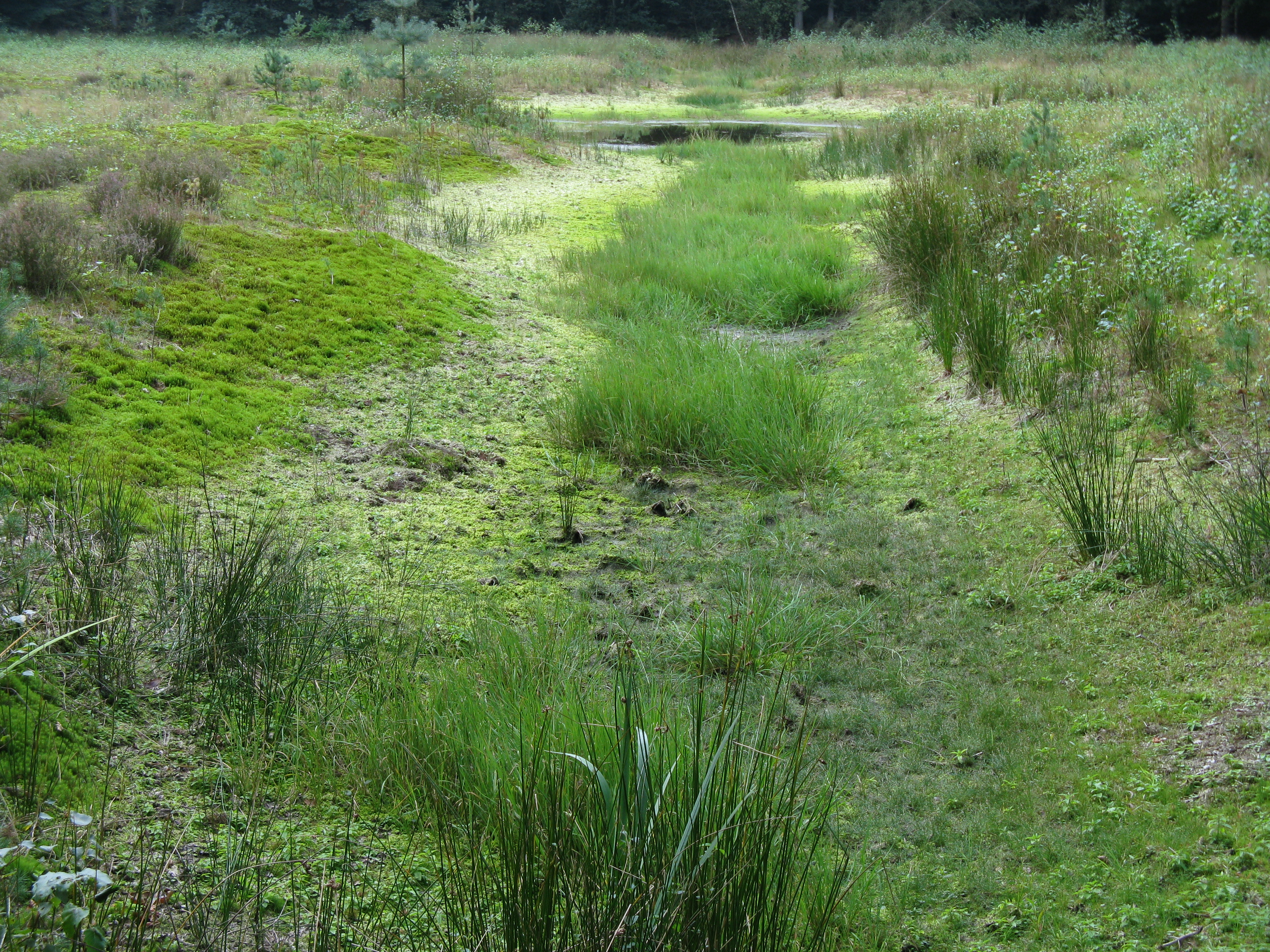
Landscape near Darthuizen

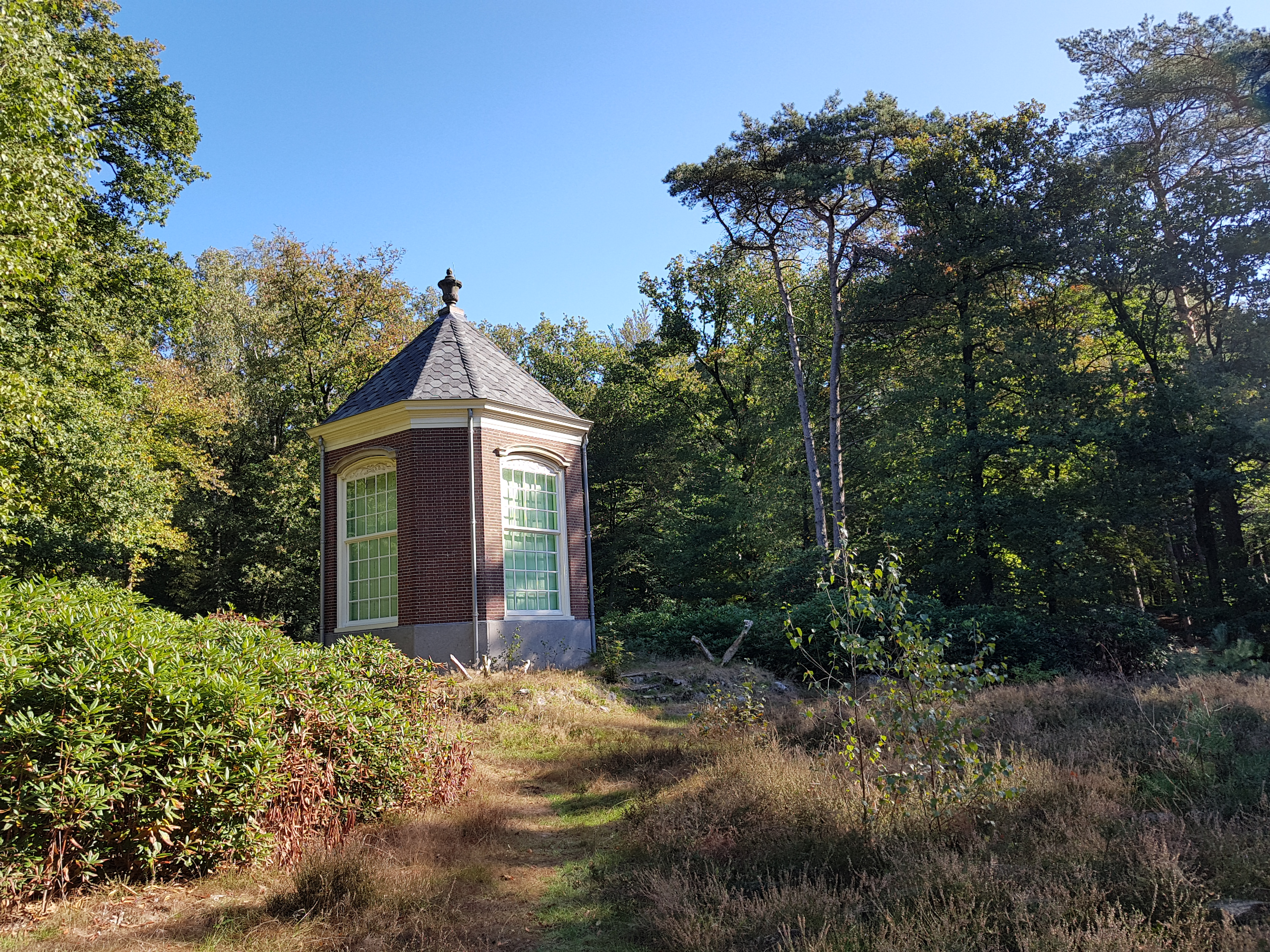
Tea house at Dartheuvel

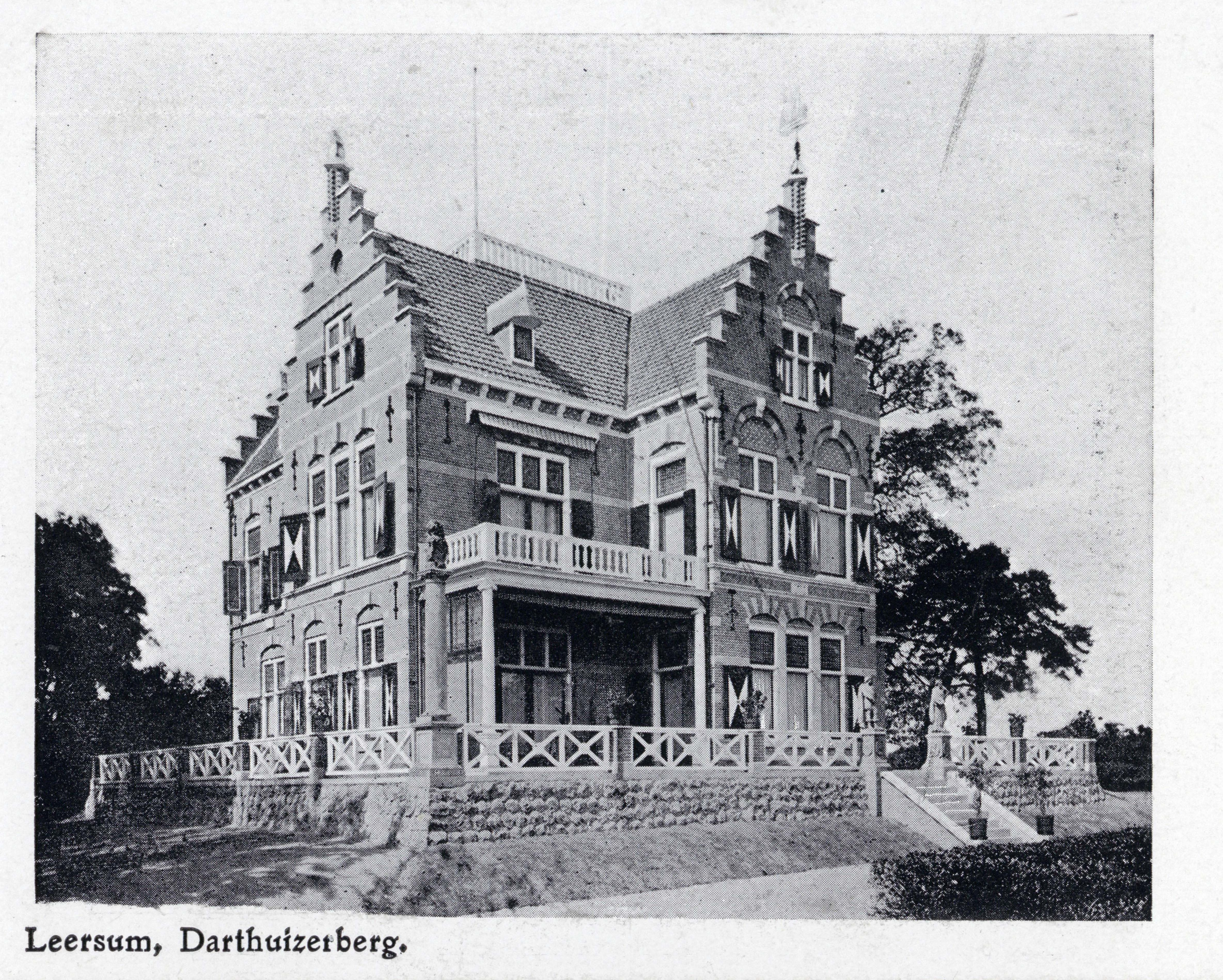
Estate Darthuizerberg (demolished 1960)

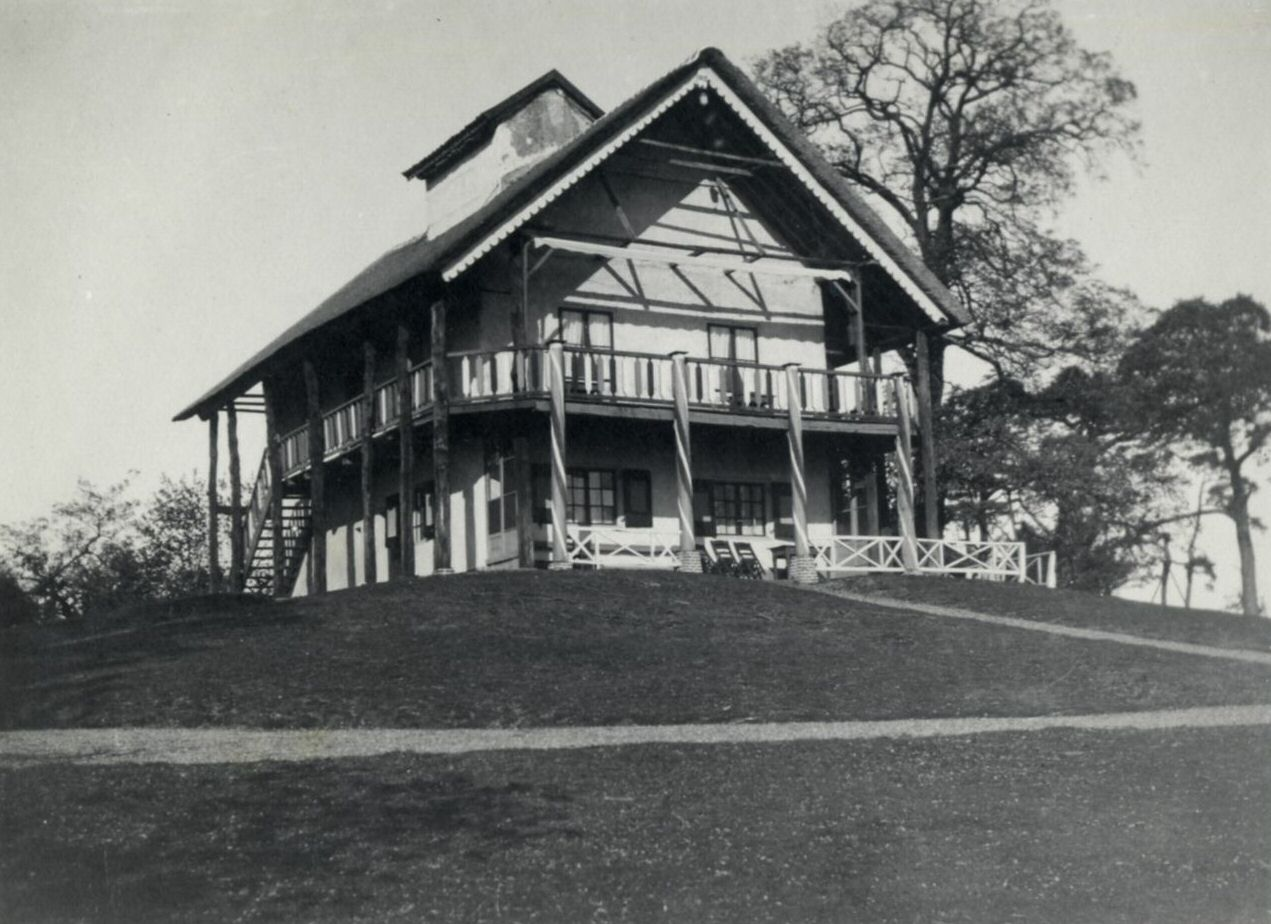
Chalet Darthuizerberg (demolished 1900)
