= N11 motorway (Netherlands) =

Motorway in the Netherlands

N11 or rijksweg 11 is a freeway in the province of South Holland in the Netherlands. It is connecting Zoeterwoude, Alphen aan den Rijn, and Bodegraven.
