= Driebergen-Rijsenburg =

- Village
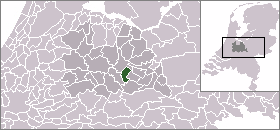

- Location within the Netherlands
- Coordinates: 52°03′N 5°17′E
- Country: Kingdom of the Netherlands
- Constituent country: Netherlands
- Province: Utrecht
- Municipality: Utrechtse Heuvelrug

Area
  - Total: 26.44 km^{2} (10.21 sq mi)
  - Land: 26.34 km^{2} (10.17 sq mi)
  - Water: 0.10 km^{2} (0.039 sq mi)

Population (2005)
  - Total: 18,570
  - Density: 705/km^{2} (1,830/sq mi)
- Time zone: UTC+1 (CET)
  - Summer (DST): UTC+2 (CEST)
- Website: www.driebergen.nl

Driebergen-Rijsenburg is a town in the municipality Utrechtse Heuvelrug in the central Netherlands, in the province of Utrecht.

It is the home of Michelin starred restaurant La Provence.

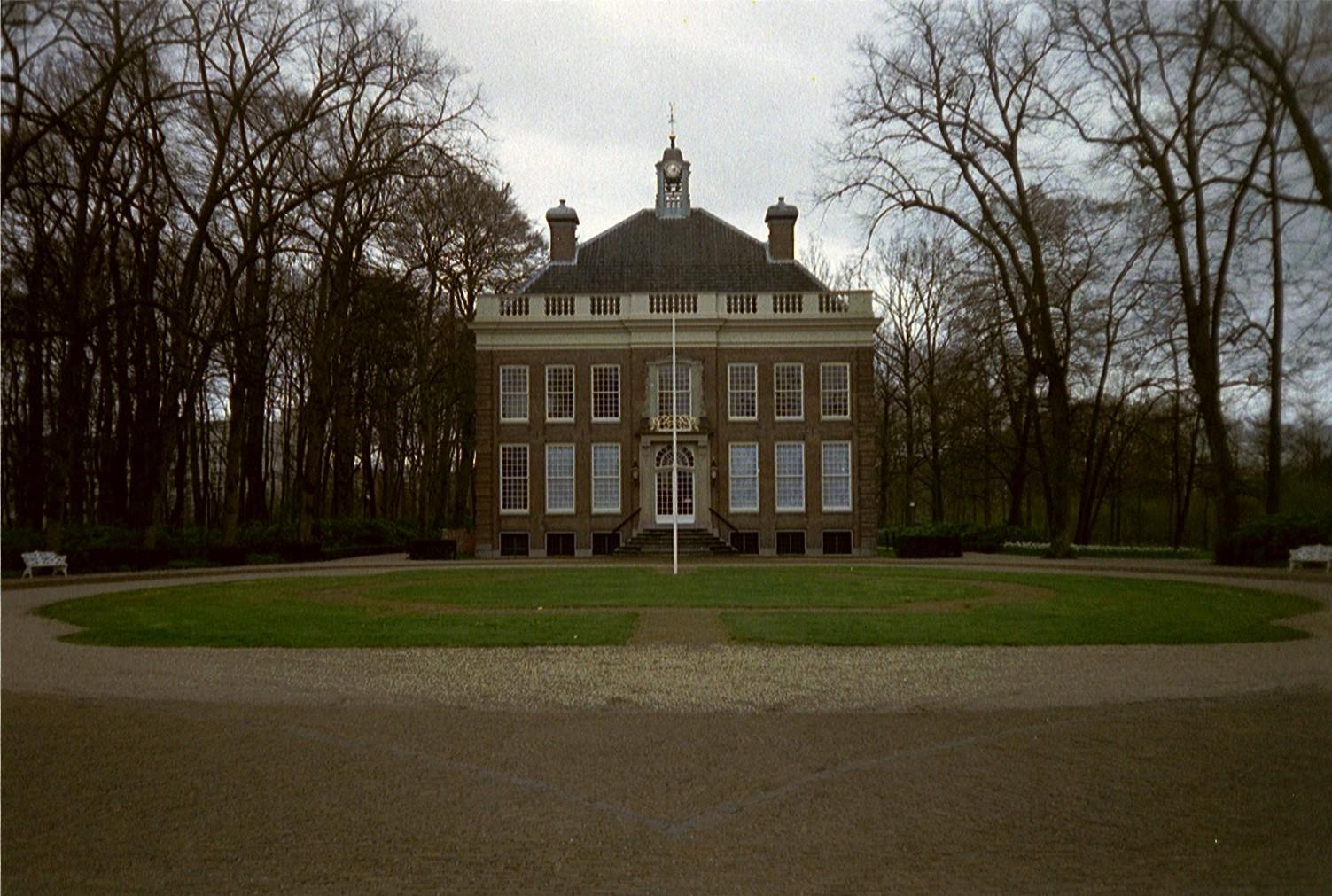
Sparrendaal in Driebergen

== Forests ==
- Driebergen forest
- Rijsenburg Forest

== Transportation ==
- Driebergen-Zeist railway station
