= Utrechtse Heuvelrug =

- Municipality
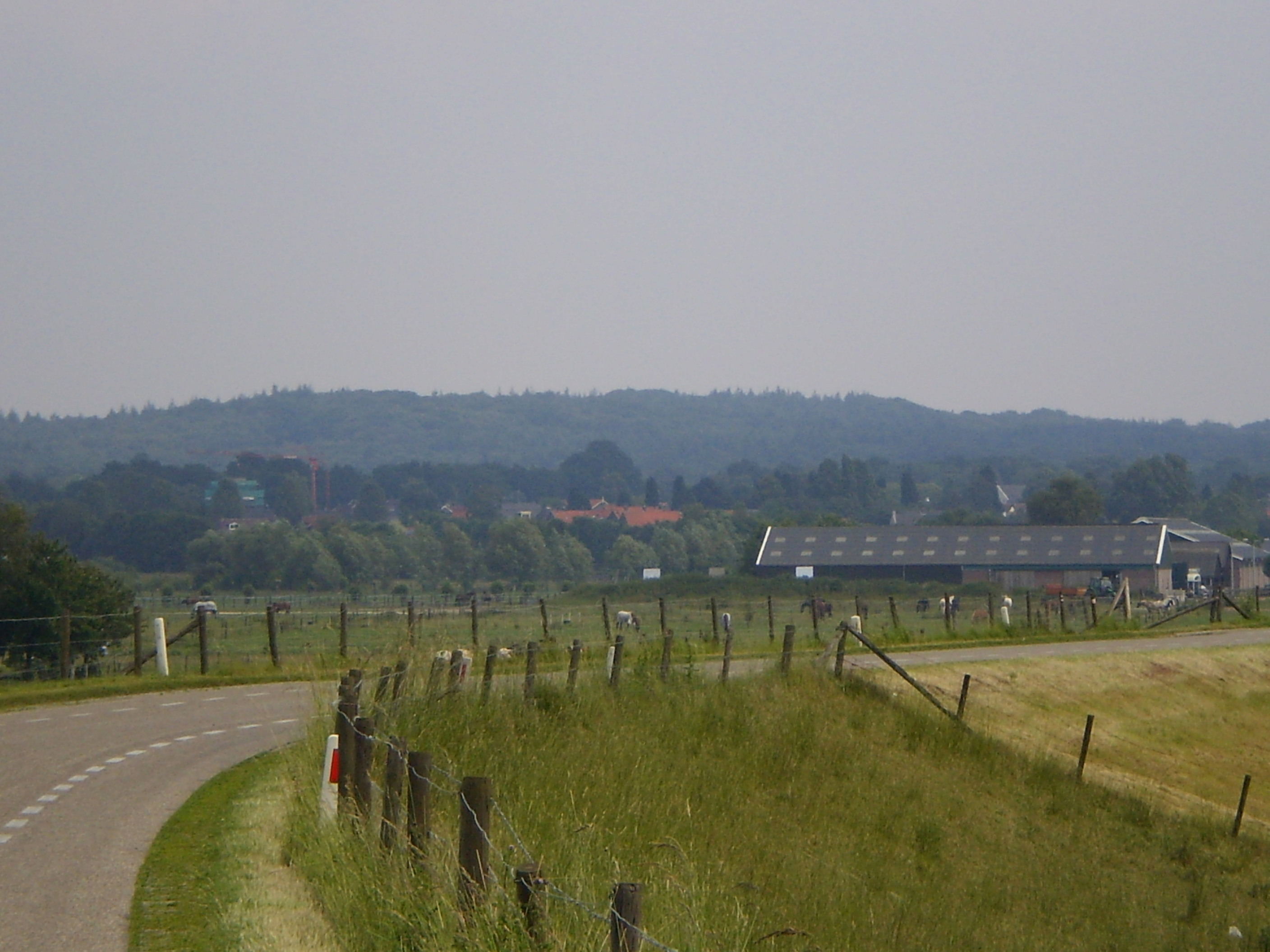
- Utrecht Hill Ridge

- Flag Coat of arms

- Location in Utrecht
- Coordinates: 52°2′N 5°21′E
- Country: Netherlands
- Province: Utrecht
- Established: 1 January 2006

Government
  - Body: Municipal council
  - Mayor: Frits Naafs (VVD)

Area
  - Total: 133.94 km^{2} (51.71 sq mi)
  - Land: 132.01 km^{2} (50.97 sq mi)
  - Water: 1.93 km^{2} (0.75 sq mi)
- Elevation: 7 m (23 ft)

Population (January 2021)
  - Total: 49,946
  - Density: 378/km^{2} (980/sq mi)
- Time zone: UTC+1 (CET)
  - Summer (DST): UTC+2 (CEST)
- Postcode: 3940–3941, 3950–3959, 3970–3972
- Area code: 0343
- Website: www.heuvelrug.nl

Utrechtse Heuvelrug (Dutch: [ˈytrɛxtsə ˈɦøːvəlrʏx]; English: "Utrecht Hill Ridge") is a municipality in the Netherlands, in the province of Utrecht. It was formed on 1 January 2006 by merging the former municipalities of Amerongen, Doorn, Driebergen-Rijsenburg, Leersum, and Maarn.

== Name ==
The name of the municipality is derived from the Utrecht Hill Ridge, a ridge of sandhills that covers part of the province of Utrecht. All the former municipalities that merged into Utrechtse Heuvelrug are situated on the southern part of this ridge. In this southern part lies the Utrechtse Heuvelrug National Park, that covers 6,000 ha (15,000 acres) and was established in 2003.

== Population centres ==
The municipality of Utrechtse Heuvelrug consists of the following cities, towns, villages and/or districts: Amerongen, Darthuizen, Doorn, Driebergen-Rijsenburg, Leersum, Maarn, Maarsbergen, Overberg.

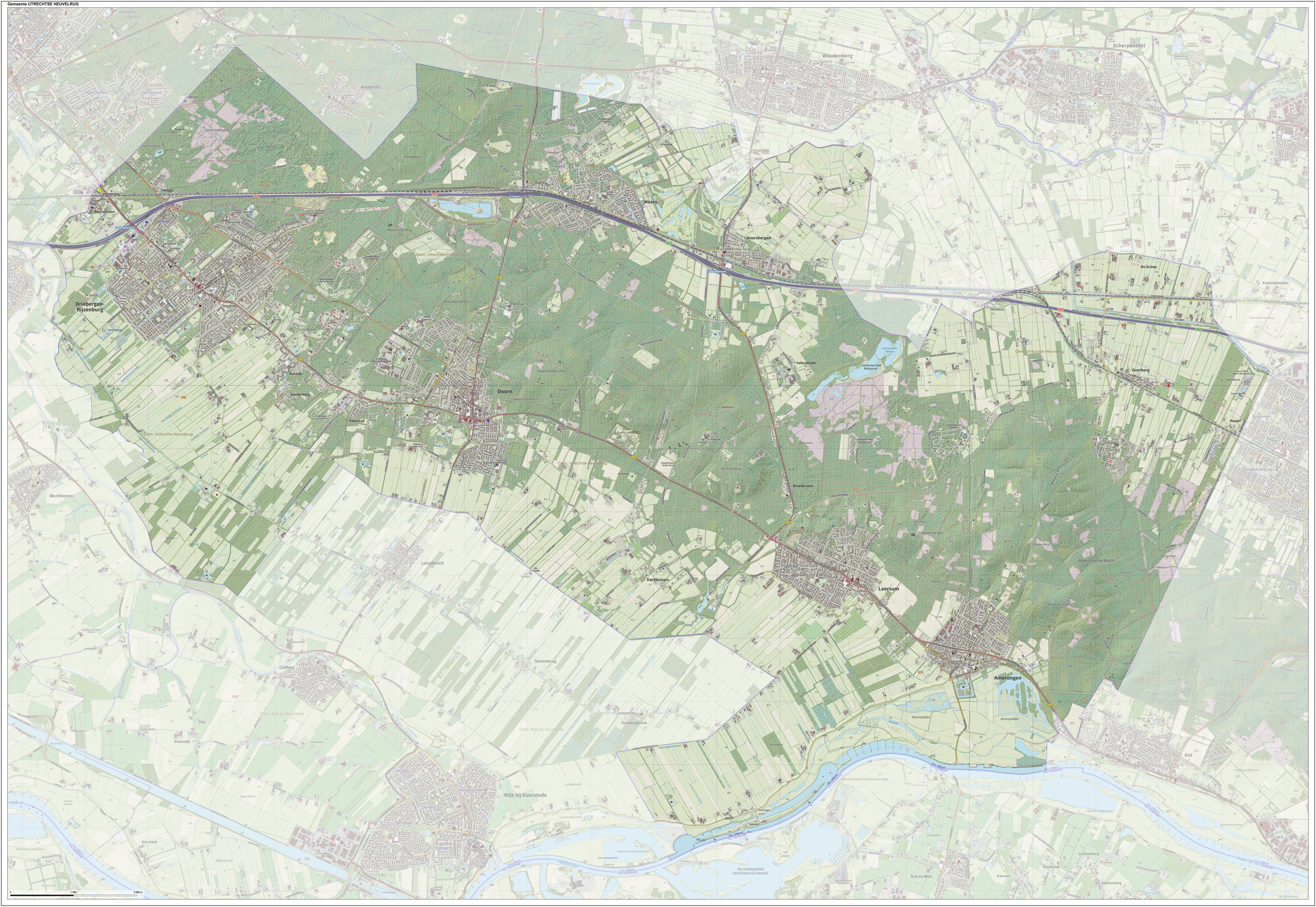

Dutch topographic map of the municipality of Utrechtse Heuvelrug, June 2015

== Transportation ==
Railway stations: Driebergen-Zeist, Maarn

== Twin towns ==
- Victoria, Romania

== Notable people ==
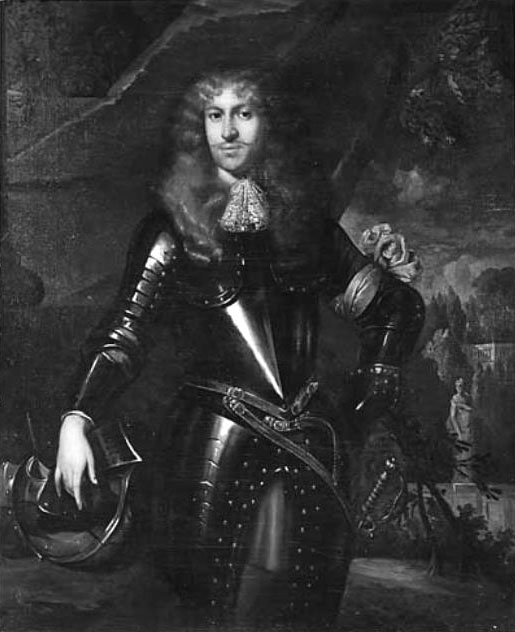
Portrait of Frederick of Nassau-Zuylestein, ca. 1675

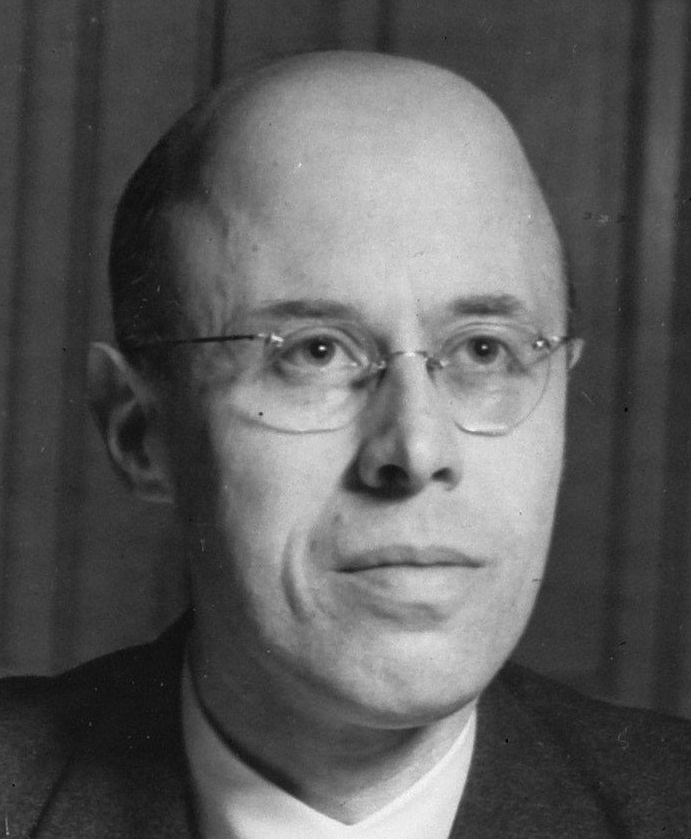
Louis Beel, 1945

=== Public thinking & public service ===
- Frederick Nassau de Zuylestein (1624–1672) illegitimate son of Frederick Henry, Prince of Orange who gave him Castle Zuylestein in 1640
- Godert de Ginkell, 1st Earl of Athlone (1644 in Amerongen – 1703) a Dutch general in the service of England
- William Nassau de Zuylestein, 1st Earl of Rochford (1649 in Castle Zuylestein – 1708) a Dutch soldier and diplomat in the service of his cousin William III of England
- Rogier Verbeek (1845 in Doorn – 1926) a Dutch geologist and natural scientist
- Wilhelm II, German Emperor (1859 – 1941 in Huis Doorn) the last German Emperor (Kaiser) and King of Prussia, lived in Doorn 1919–1941
- Princess Hermine Reuss of Greiz (1887–1947) married Wilhelm II (1859–1941) in Doorn
- Louis Beel (1902 in Roermond – 1977) a Dutch politician, Prime Minister of the Netherlands 1946/8 and 1958/1959
- Ria Beckers (1938 in Driebergen – 2006) Dutch politician, co-founder of the GreenLeft party
- Herman Wijffels (born 1942 in Turkeye) a retired Dutch politician and businessman.
- Ben Verwaayen (born 1952 in Driebergen) Dutch businessman, CEO of Alcatel-Lucent 2008/13.
- Aart Jan de Geus (born 1955 in Doorn) a retired Dutch politician and businessman
- Dick Benschop (born 1957 in Driebergen) a retired Dutch politician and businessman
- Olaf Stuger (born 1969 in Driebergen) a Dutch politician and Member of the European Parliament
- Tjalling Halbertsma (born 1969 in Doorn) a lawyer and anthropologist

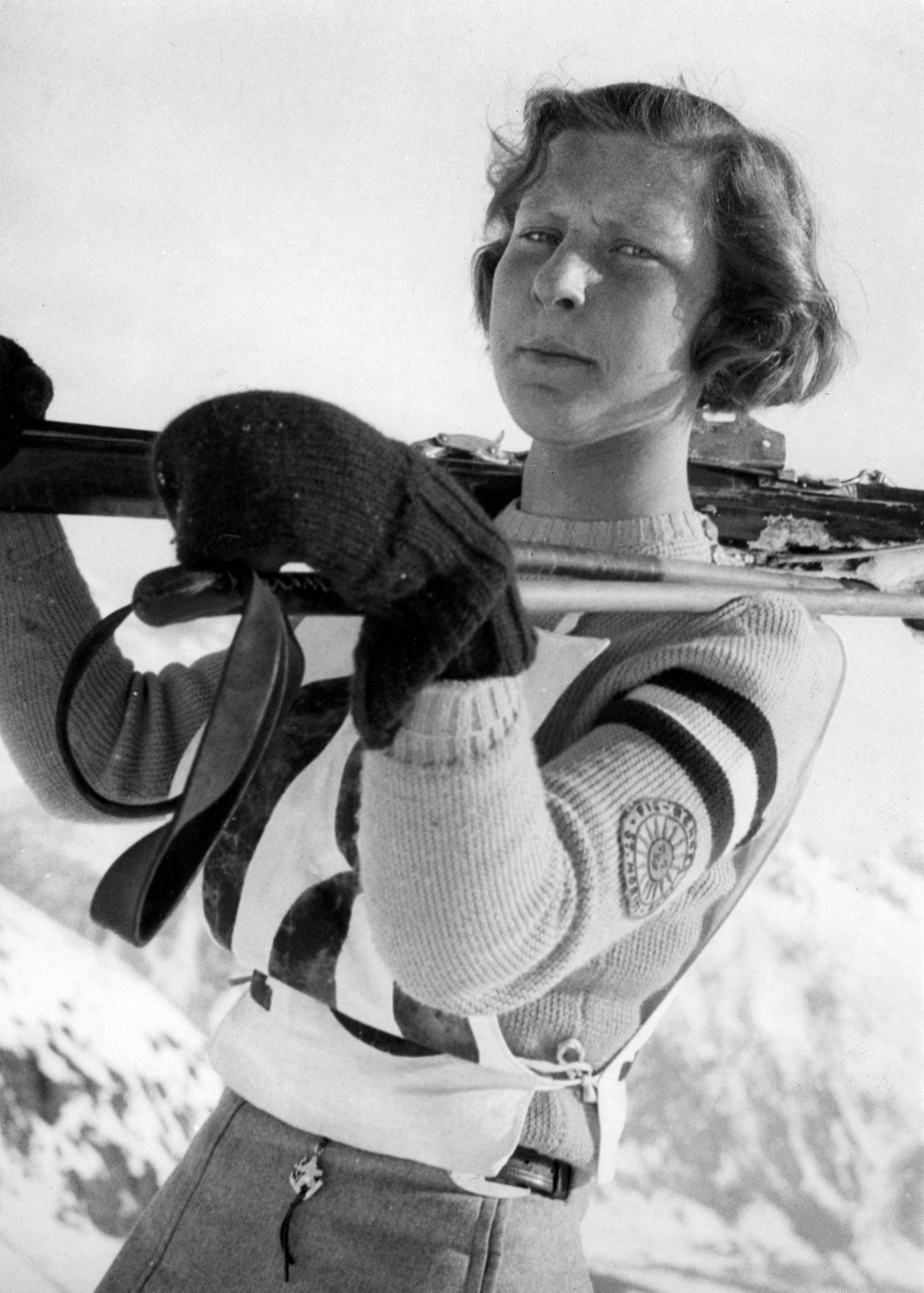
Gratia Schimmelpenninck van der Oye, 1930

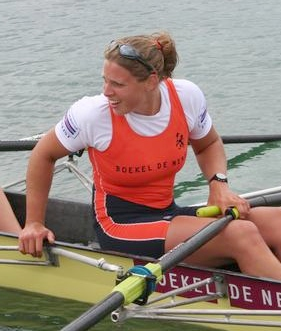
Claudia Belderbos, 2009

=== The arts ===
- Christian Mali (1832 in Darthuizen) – 1906) a German painter and art professor
- Anton van Wouw (1862 in Driebergen - 1945) sculptor, the father of South African sculpture
- Aldo van Eyck (1918 in Driebergen – 1999) an architect, protagonist of Structuralism.
- Peter Bree (1949 in Driebergen) a Dutch oboist and radio presenter
- Gijs Scholten van Aschat (born 1959 in Doorn) a Dutch actor
- Job ter Burg (born 1972 in Maarn) a Dutch film editor
- Nicky Romero (born 1989 in Amerongen) a Dutch musician, DJ, record producer and remixer

=== Sport ===
- Jan de Beaufort (1880 in Doorn – 1946) a Dutch fencer, competed at three Olympic Games
- Jops Reeman (1886 in Amerongen – 1959) a Dutch football player who won bronze in the 1908 Summer Olympics
- Gratia Schimmelpenninck van der Oye (1912 in Doorn – 2012) a Dutch alpine skier, competed at the 1936 Winter Olympics
- Carel Godin de Beaufort (1934 in Maarsbergen – 1964) a Dutch nobleman and motorsport driver
- Nienke Kingma (born 1982 in Driebergen) is a rower, silver medallist in the 2008 Summer Olympics and bronze medallist at the 2012 Summer Olympics
- Claudia Belderbos (born 1985 in Doorn) a Dutch rower who won bronze at the 2012 Summer Olympics

== Gallery ==
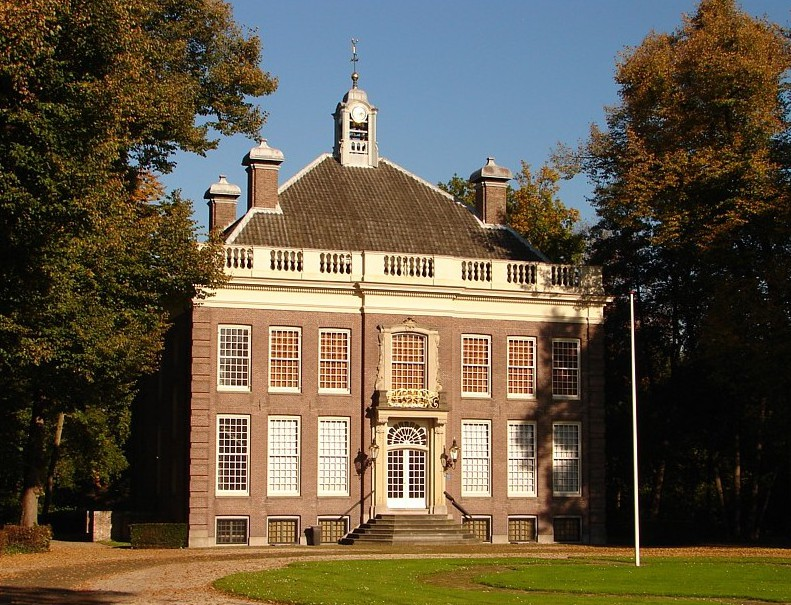
Sparrendaal Driebergen

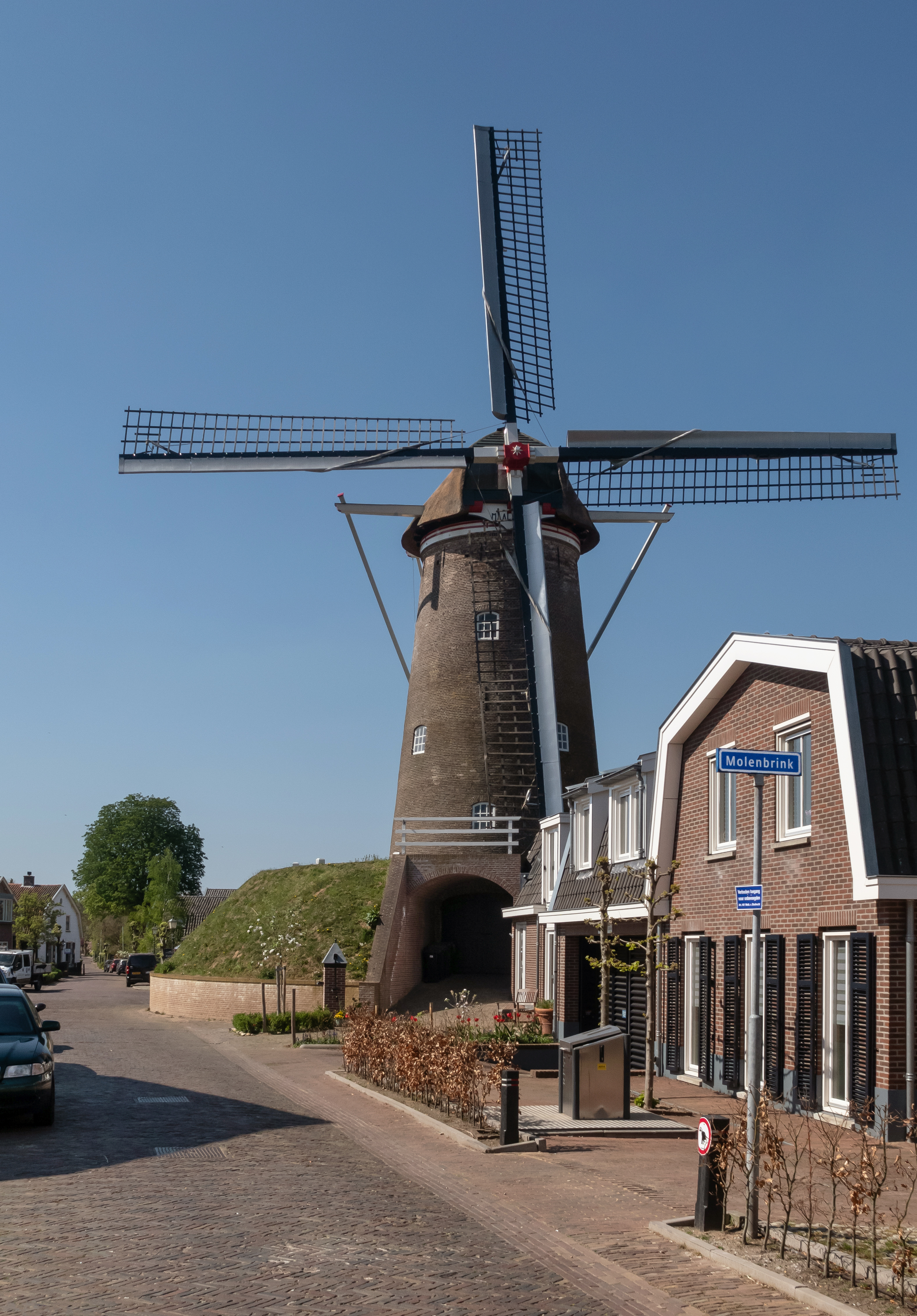
Amerongen, korenmolen Maallust

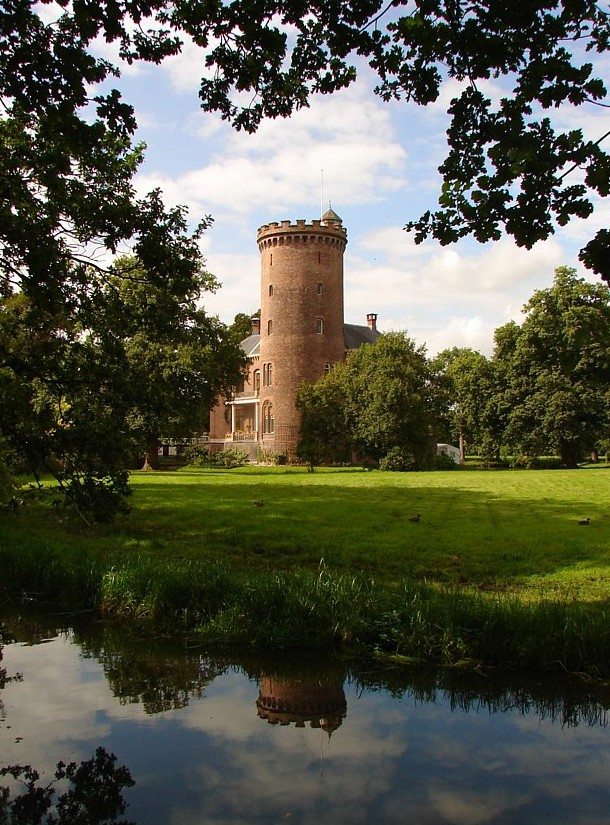
Sterkenburg Castle

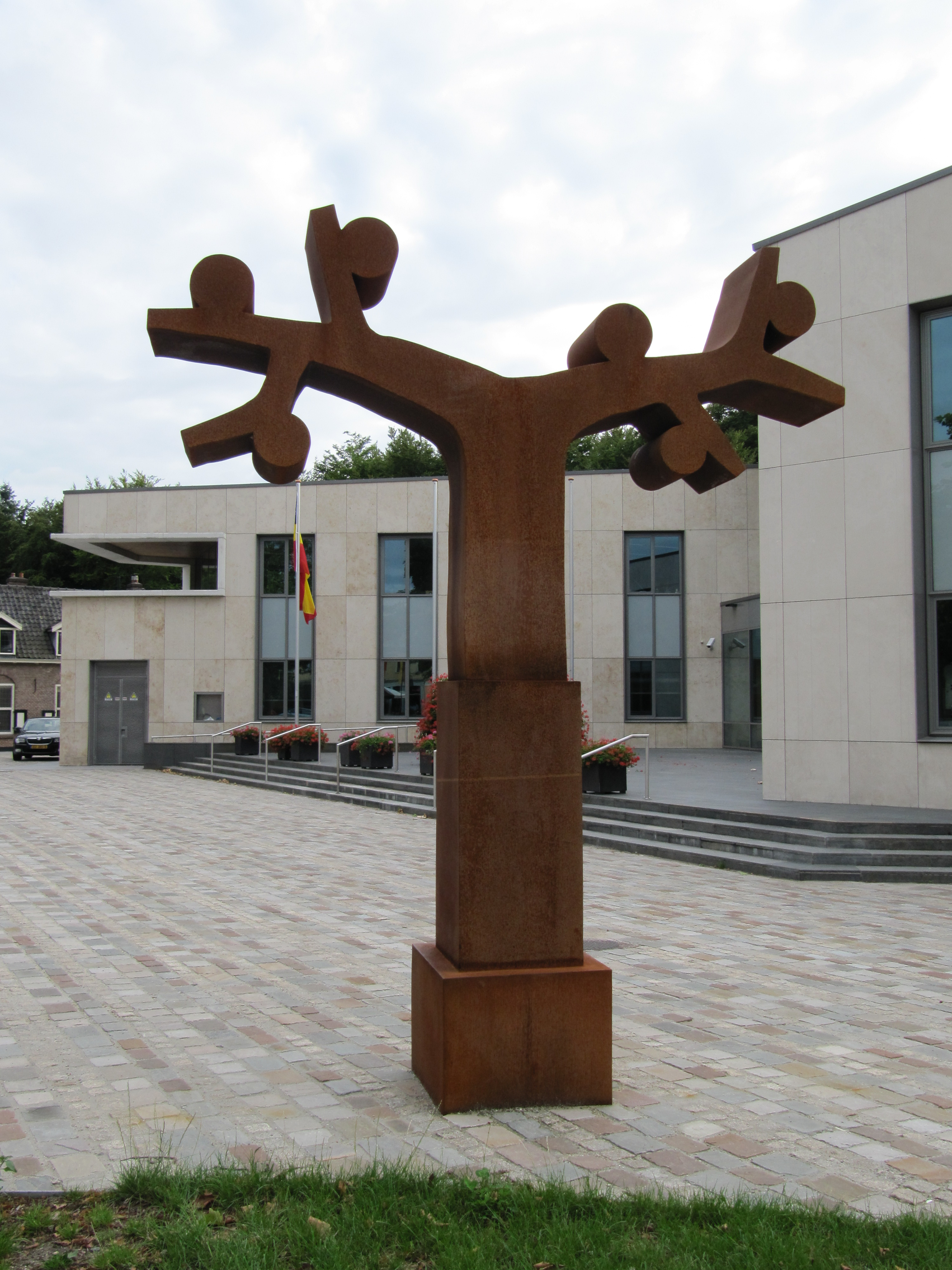
Doorn - Sculptuur voor het gemeentehuis op het Dorpsplein

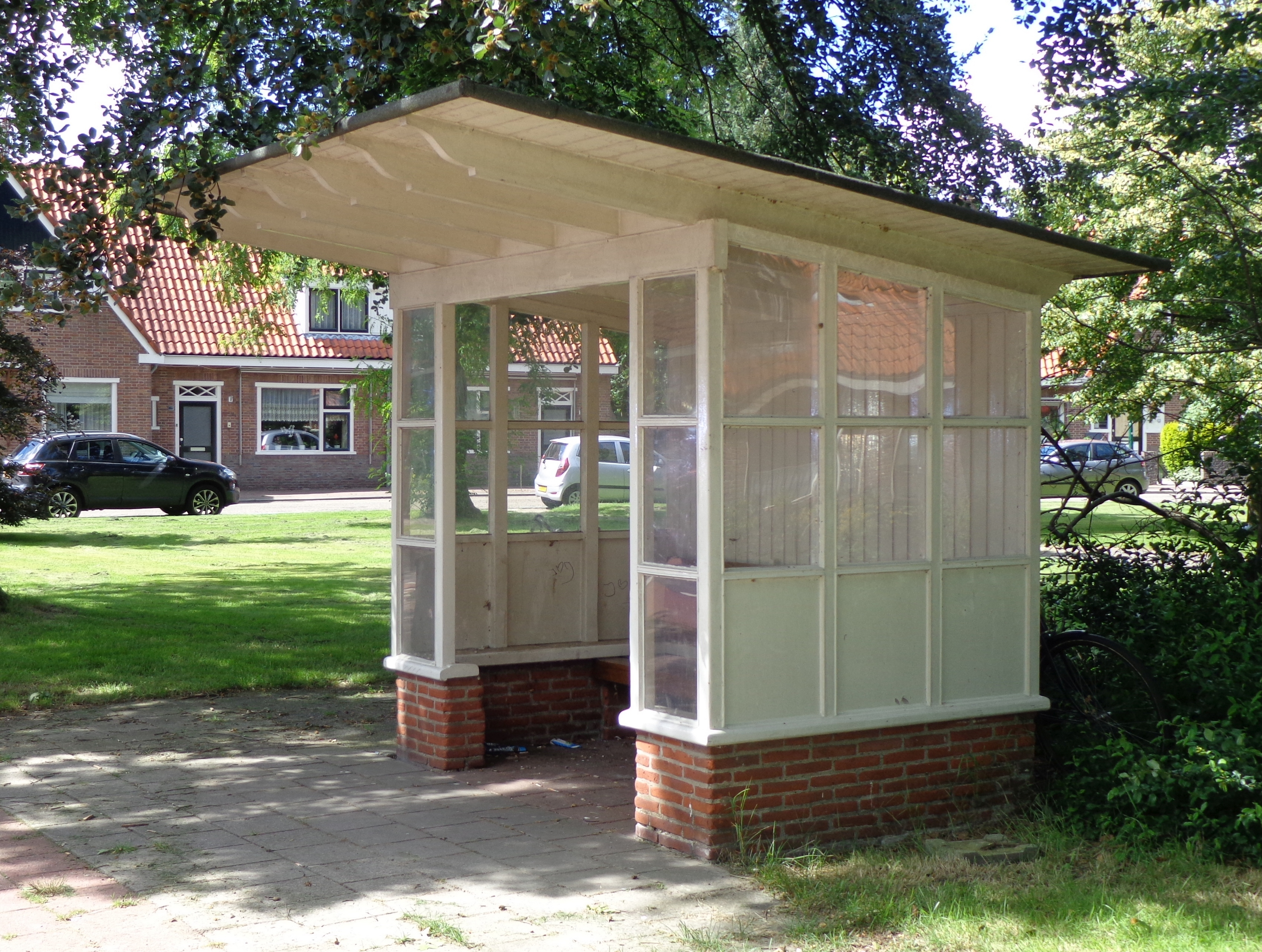
Maarn Tuindorpweg Bushokje

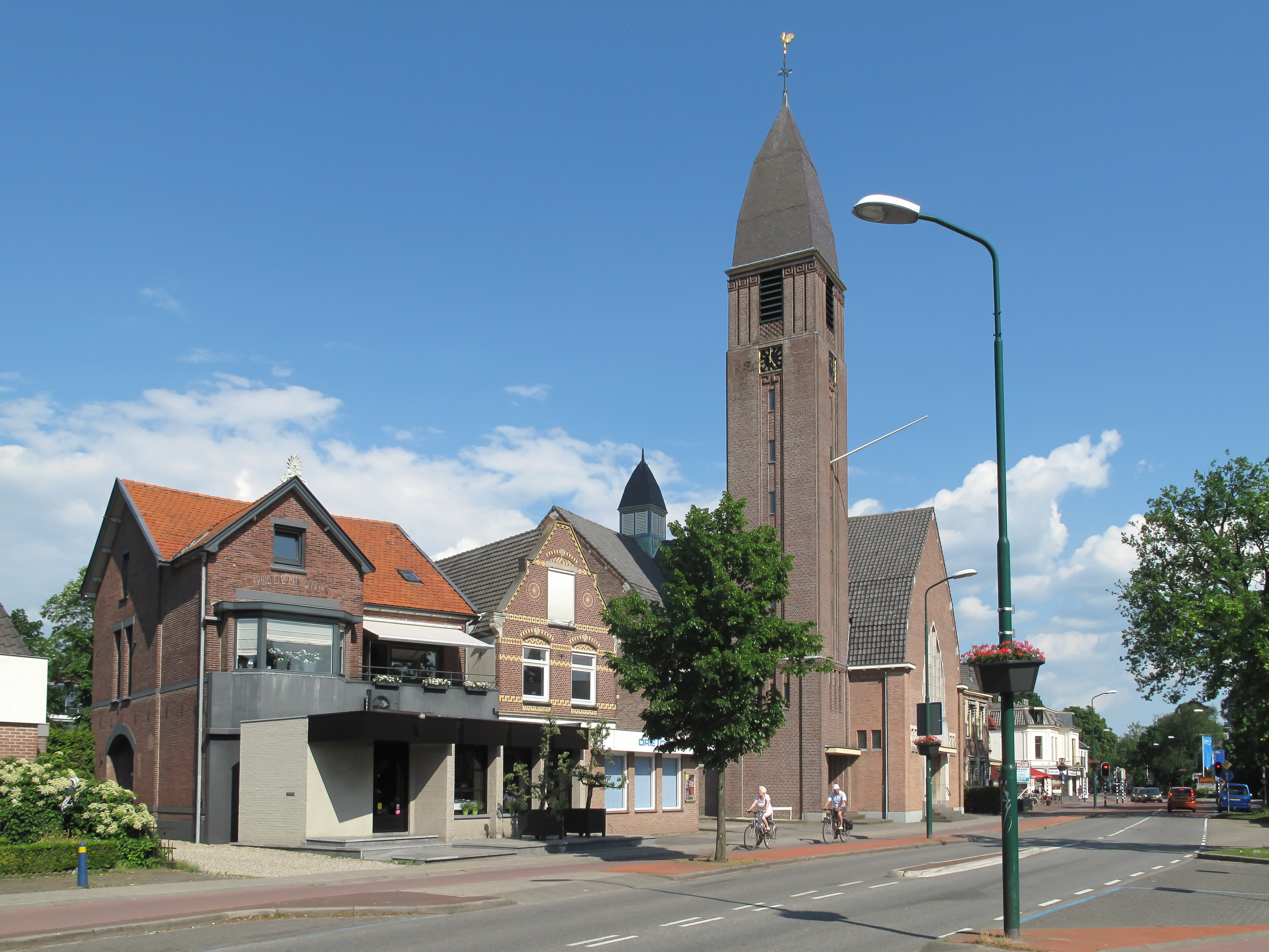
Driebergen, church (de Grote Kerk)

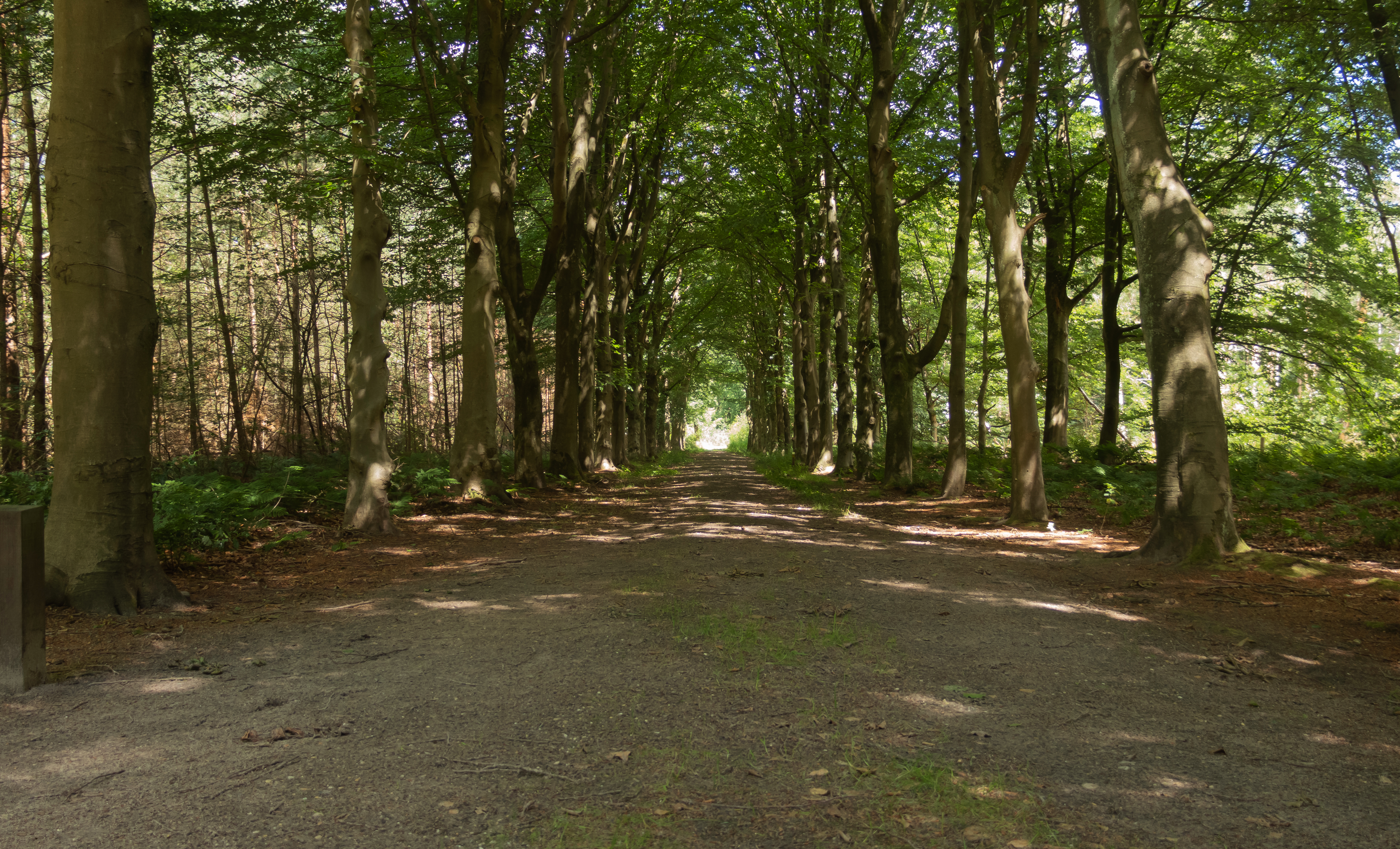
Doorn, heath: the Dartheide
