= Maarn =

Town in the province of Utrecht, Netherlands

- Town
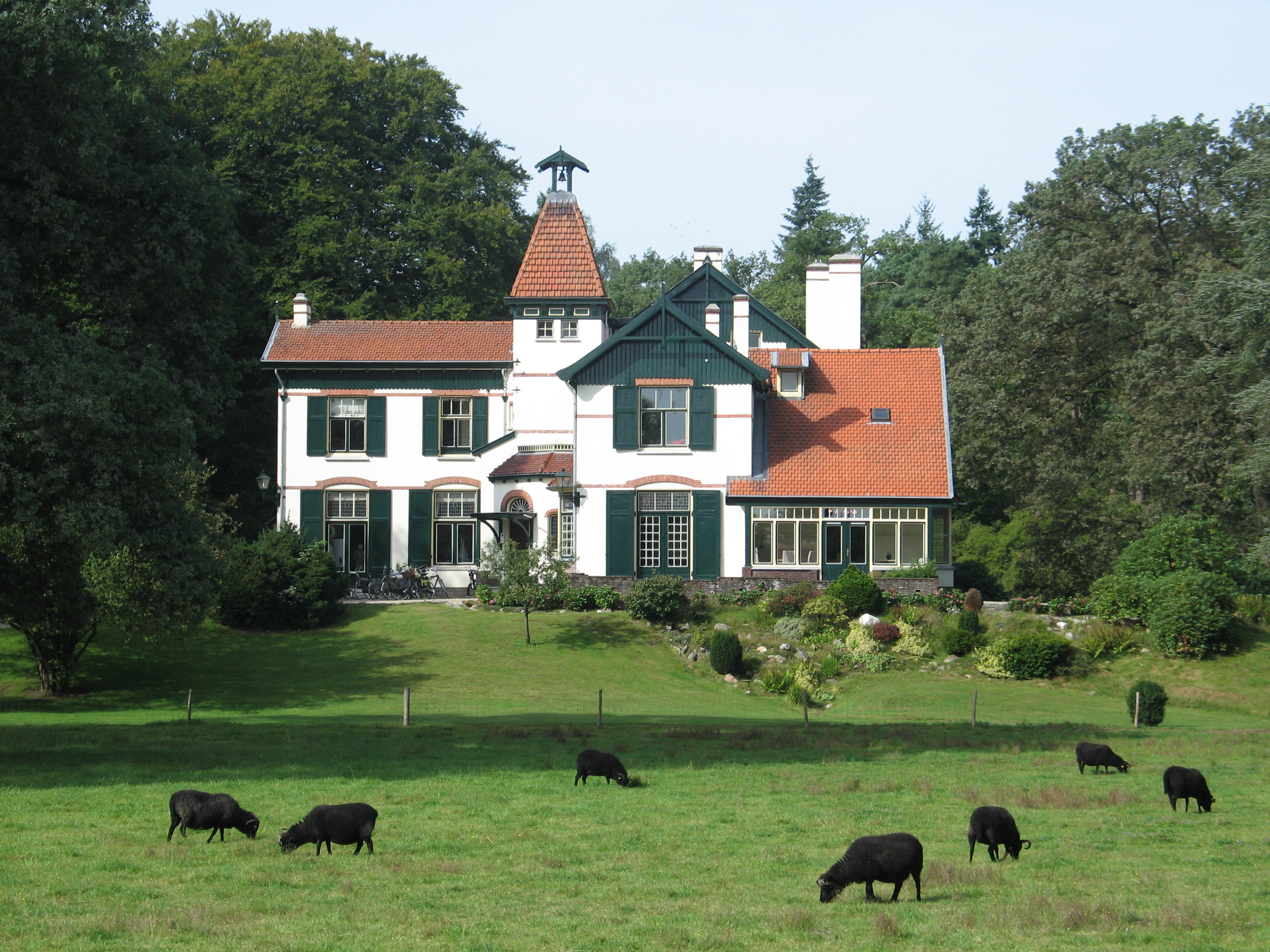
- Huize 't Stort

- Flag Coat of arms

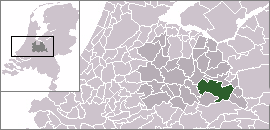
- The former municipality of Maarn

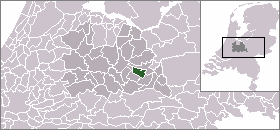
- Coordinates: 52°4′N 5°22′E
- Country: Netherlands
- Province: Utrecht
- Municipality: Utrechtse Heuvelrug

Population (1 January 2021)
  - Total: 4,769
- Postal codes: 3950, 3951
- Area code: 0343
- Major roads: A12, N227

Maarn is a town in the municipality of Utrechtse Heuvelrug in the Dutch province of Utrecht. It is located about 10 km (6.2 mi) east of Zeist.

In 2001, the town of Maarn had 4,071 inhabitants. The built-up area of the town was 1.26 km^{2}; it contained 1,793 residences. Until 2006, Maarn was its own municipality, covering both Maarn and neighbouring Maarsbergen.

Maarn is a small town in the heart of the Utrechtse Heuvelrug, a protected nature reserve in the Netherlands. The town and its surroundings have approximately 8,000 inhabitants, a small centre and are probably best known for tourism to the numerous camp-sites that surround the town.

== History ==
Maarn was built in 1921 for the workers who worked in the sand excavation of the Dutch Railways. In 2003 municipality was renovated according to current standards and regulations.

== Transportation ==
Railway station: Maarn

== Gallery ==
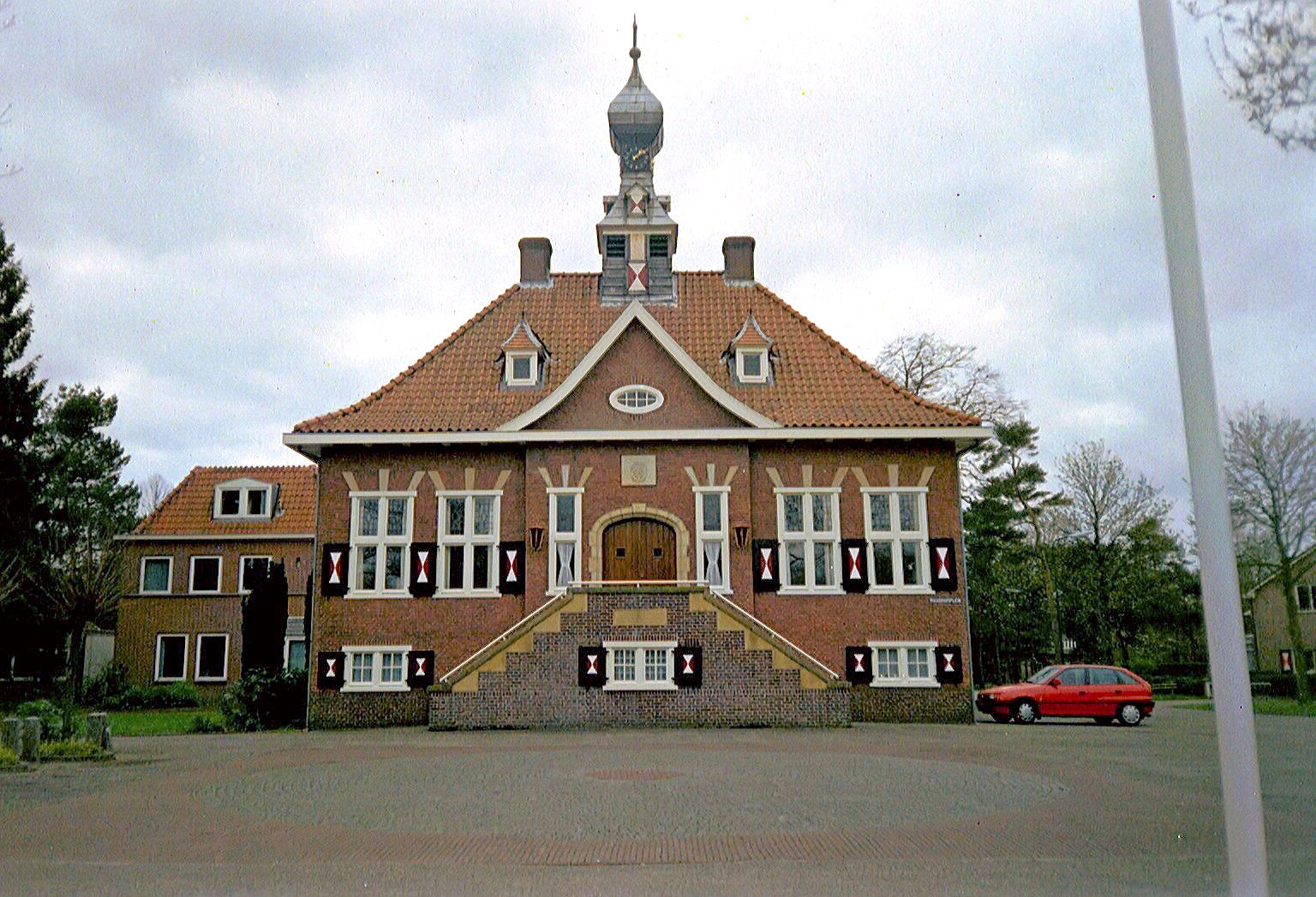
Former Maarn Town Hall

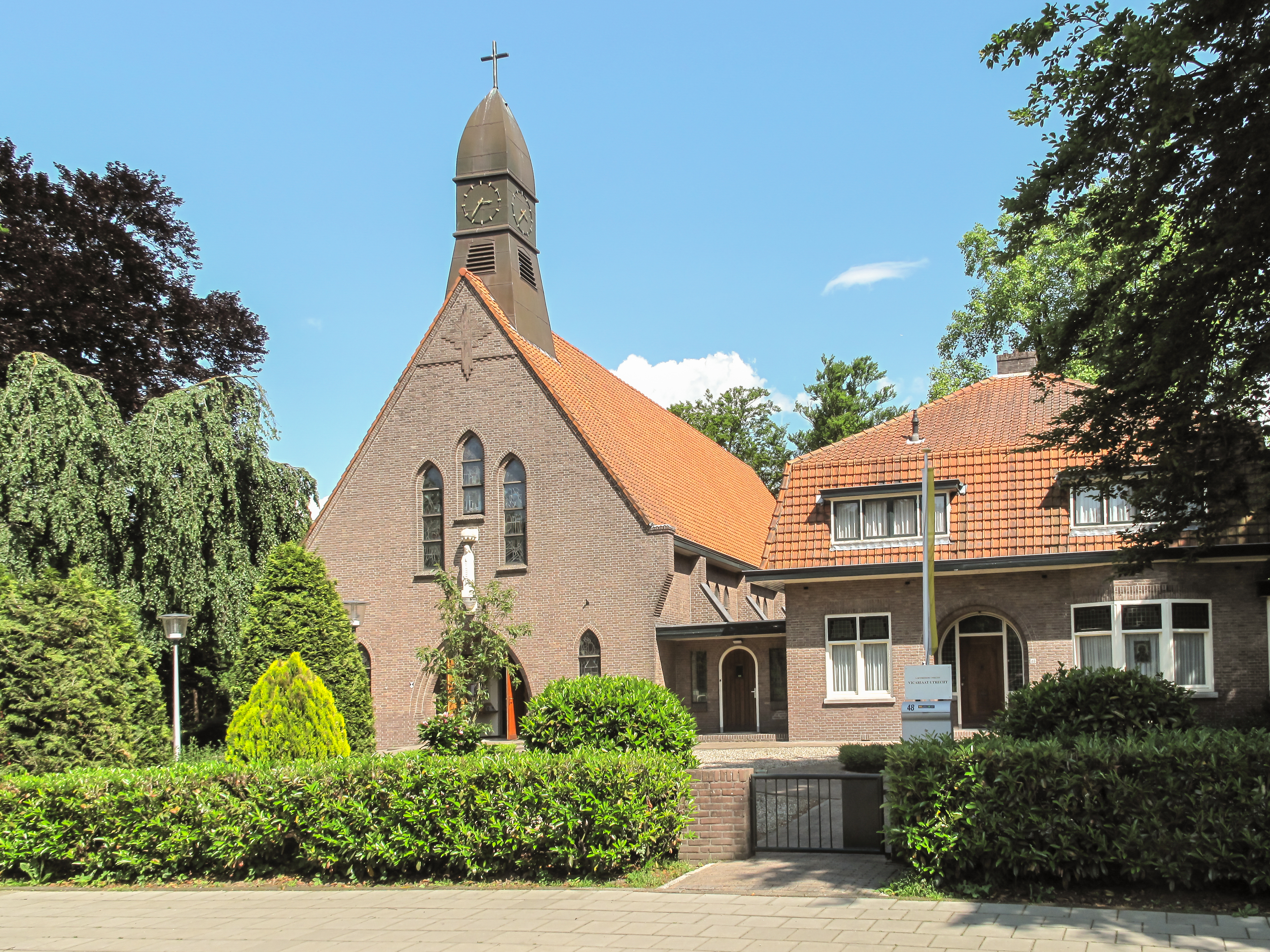
Church: Sint Theresiakerk

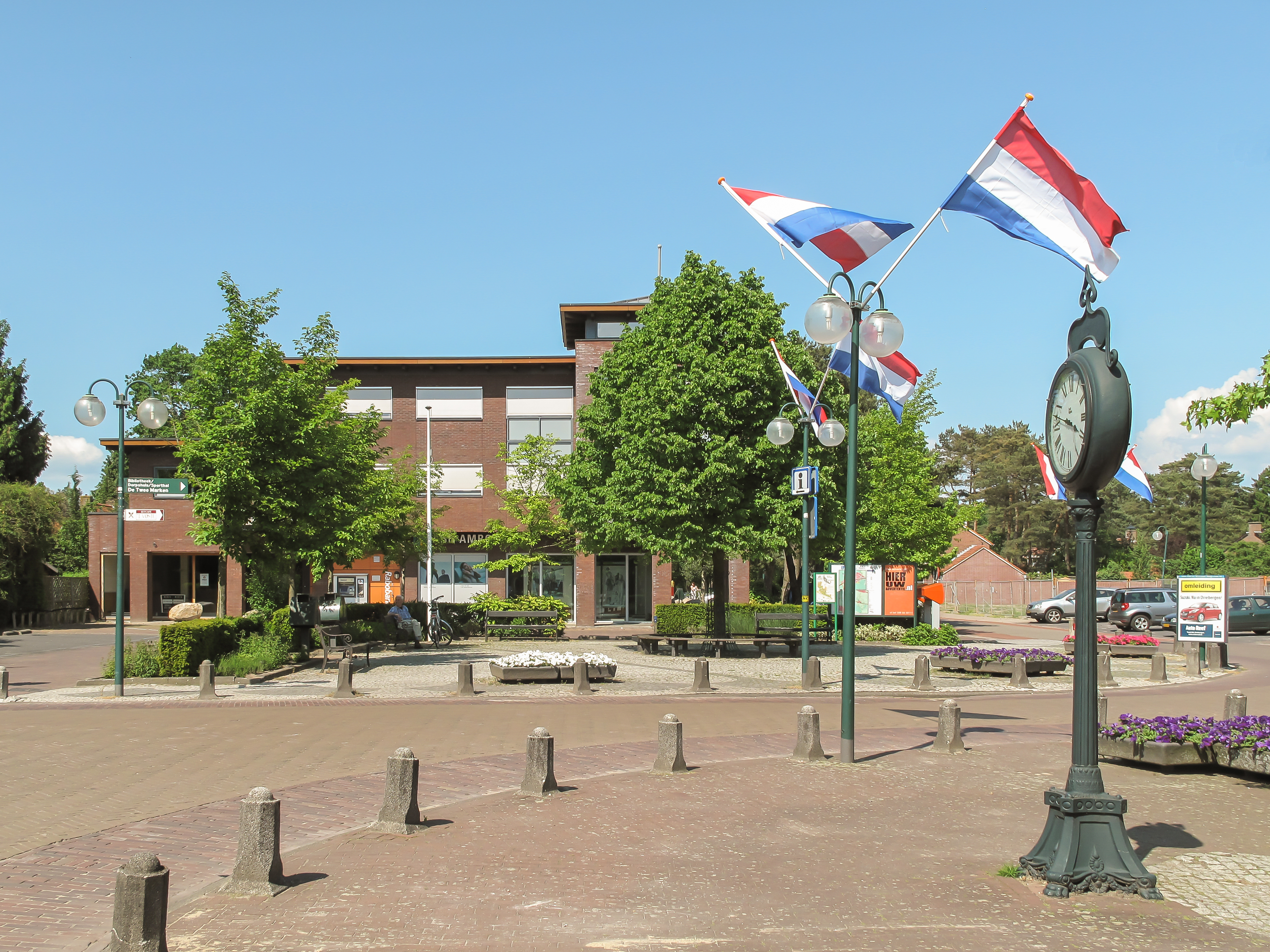
Square: Het 5 mei-plein

== Notable people ==
- Thomas Hylkema (born 1988), racing driver
