= Leersum =

Town in the province of Utrecht, Netherlands

- Town
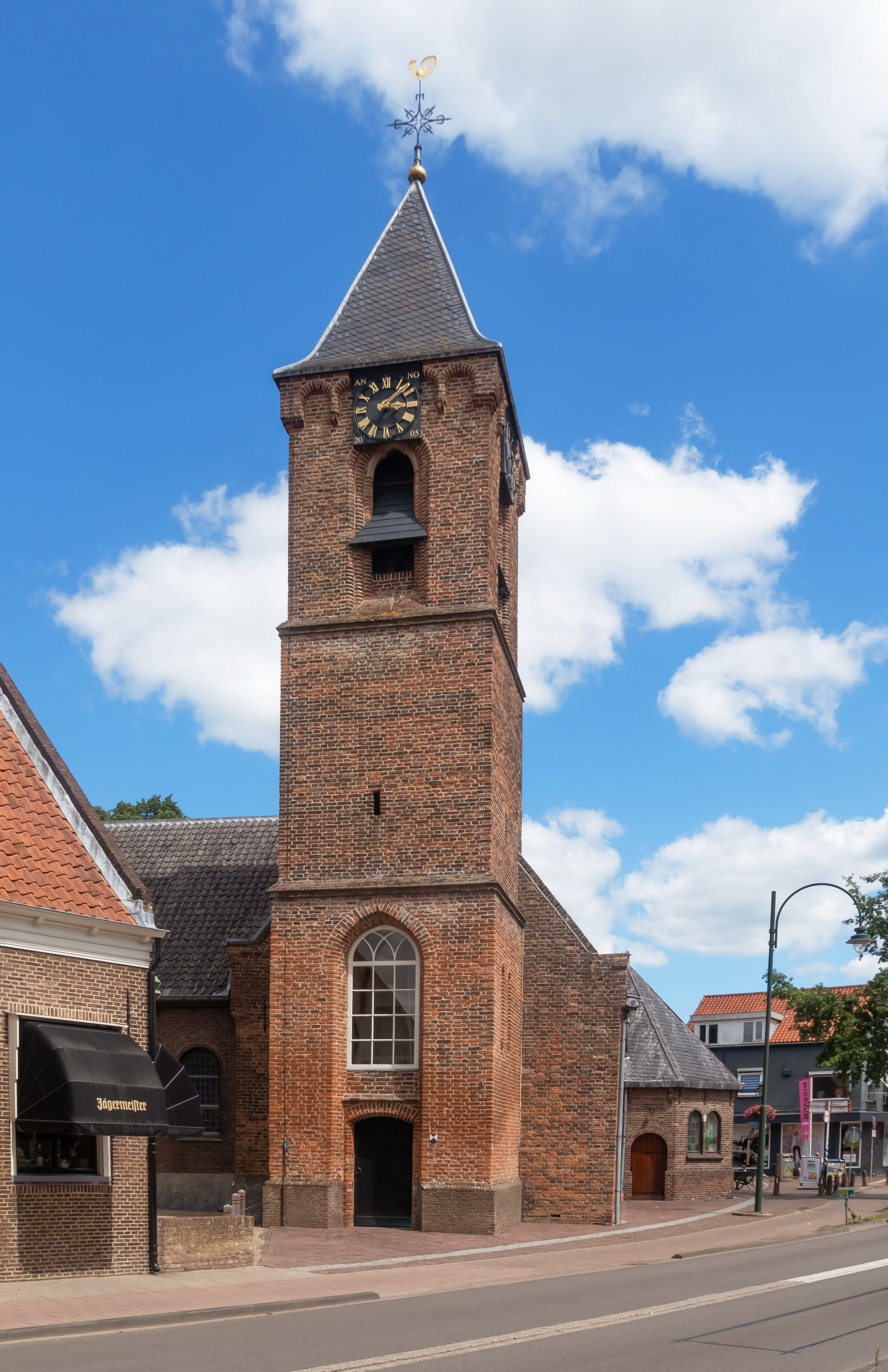
- Michaëlskerk

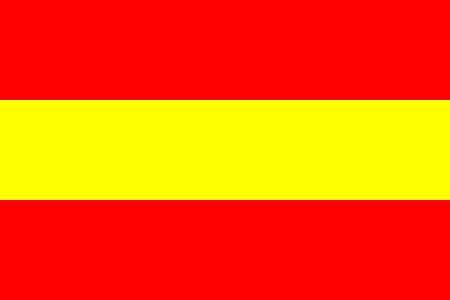
- Flag Coat of arms

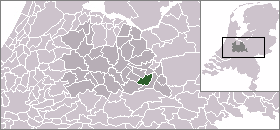
- The former municipality of Leersum

- Location in the Netherlands
- Coordinates: 52°1′00″N 5°26′00″E
- Country: Netherlands
- Province: (Utrecht (province)) Utrecht
- Municipality: Utrechtse Heuvelrug

Population (1 January 2021)
  - Total: 7,675
- Demonym: Leersummer
- Time zone: UTC+1 (CET)
  - Summer (DST): CEST
- Postal code: 3956
- Area code: 0343

Leersum is a town in the municipality of Utrechtse Heuvelrug in the Dutch province of Utrecht. It lies about 7 km (4.3 mi) east of Doorn and 9 km (5.5 mi) west of Veenendaal.

In 2001, the town of Leersum had 6013 inhabitants. The built-up area of the town was 1.44 km^{2}; it contained 2465 residences. Until 2006, Leersum was its own municipality, covering both the town of Leersum and neighbouring Darthuizen.

In June 2021, Leersum was hit by a downburst. Many cars and homes were heavily damaged by falling trees. As a result, the forests around Leersum have been closed. Staatsbosbeheer, the Dutch state forest administration, estimates that damaged sections of forest will not be reopened to the general public before the end of the year 2021.
