= Prinzenhof =

Former Dutch baroque palace of John Maurice of Nassau-Siegen in Kleve, Germany

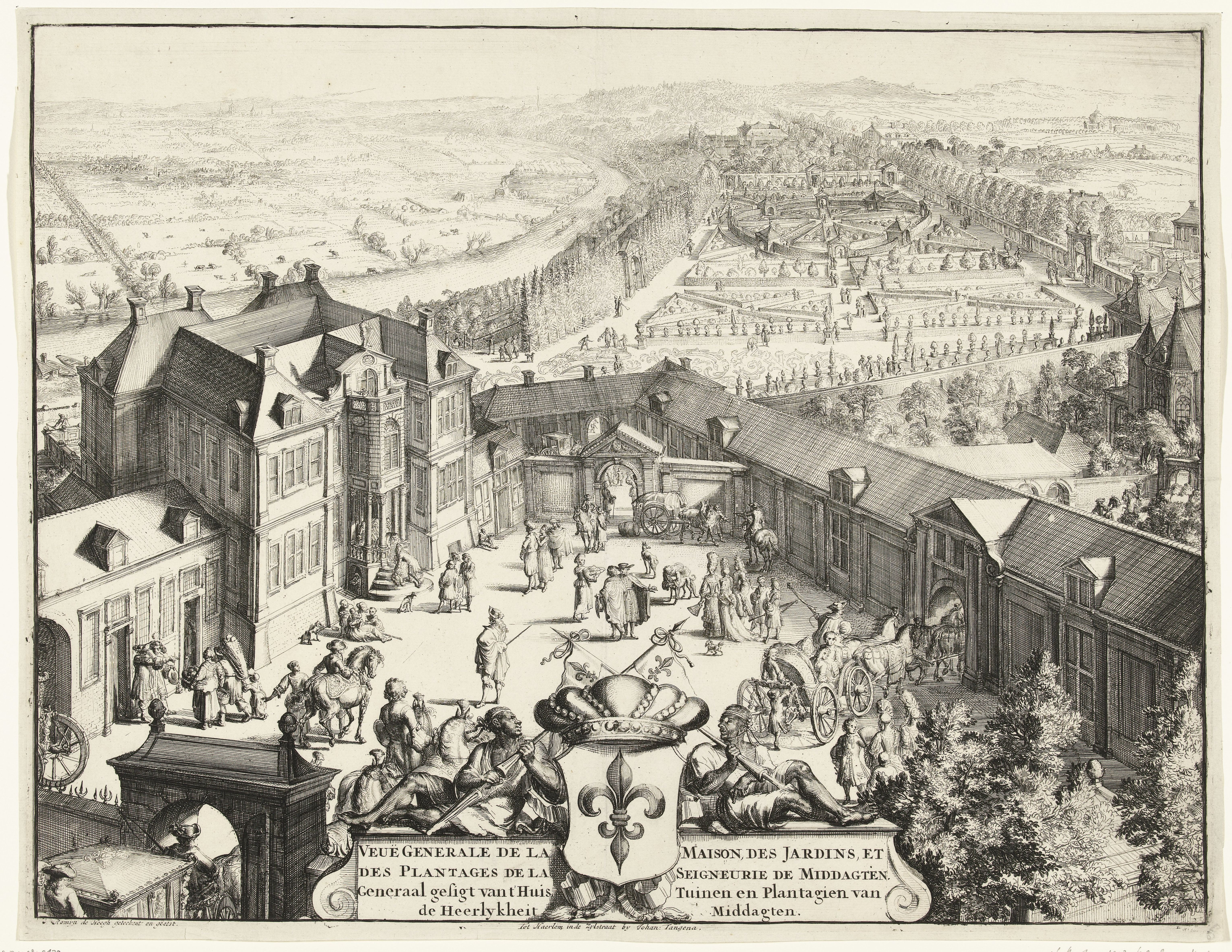
The Prinzenhof palace and its gardens in its heyday by Romeyn de Hooghe (between 1685 and 1695). The palace had a beautiful view over the Rhine valley

The Prinzenhof was a Dutch Baroque palace located in Kleve, Germany, designed by architect Maurits Post for prince Johan Maurice of Nassau-Siegen, the governor of the Duchy of Cleves. Originally built in the mid-17th century, it served as a residence and a symbol of Johan Maurice's influence in the region. By the late 19th century, the palace was repurposed as a hotel. Unfortunately, it was heavily damaged during World War II and was not reconstructed after the war.

== History ==
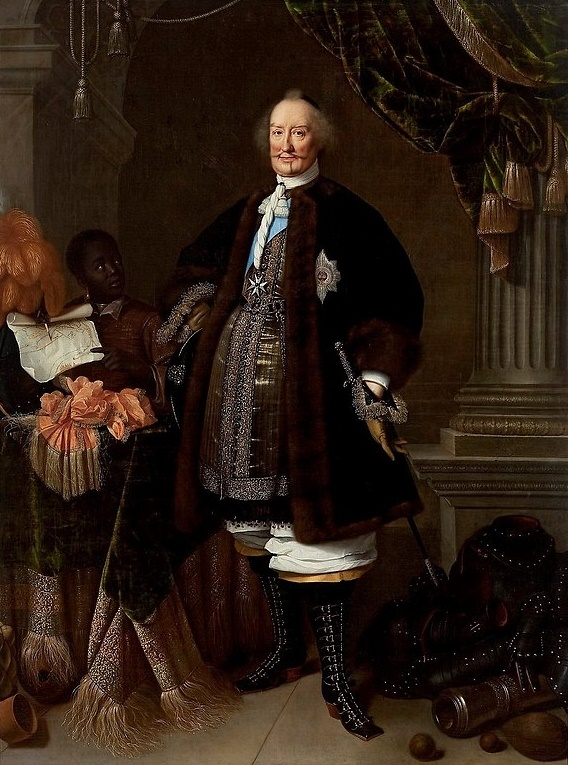
Prince John Maurice of Nassau-Siegen

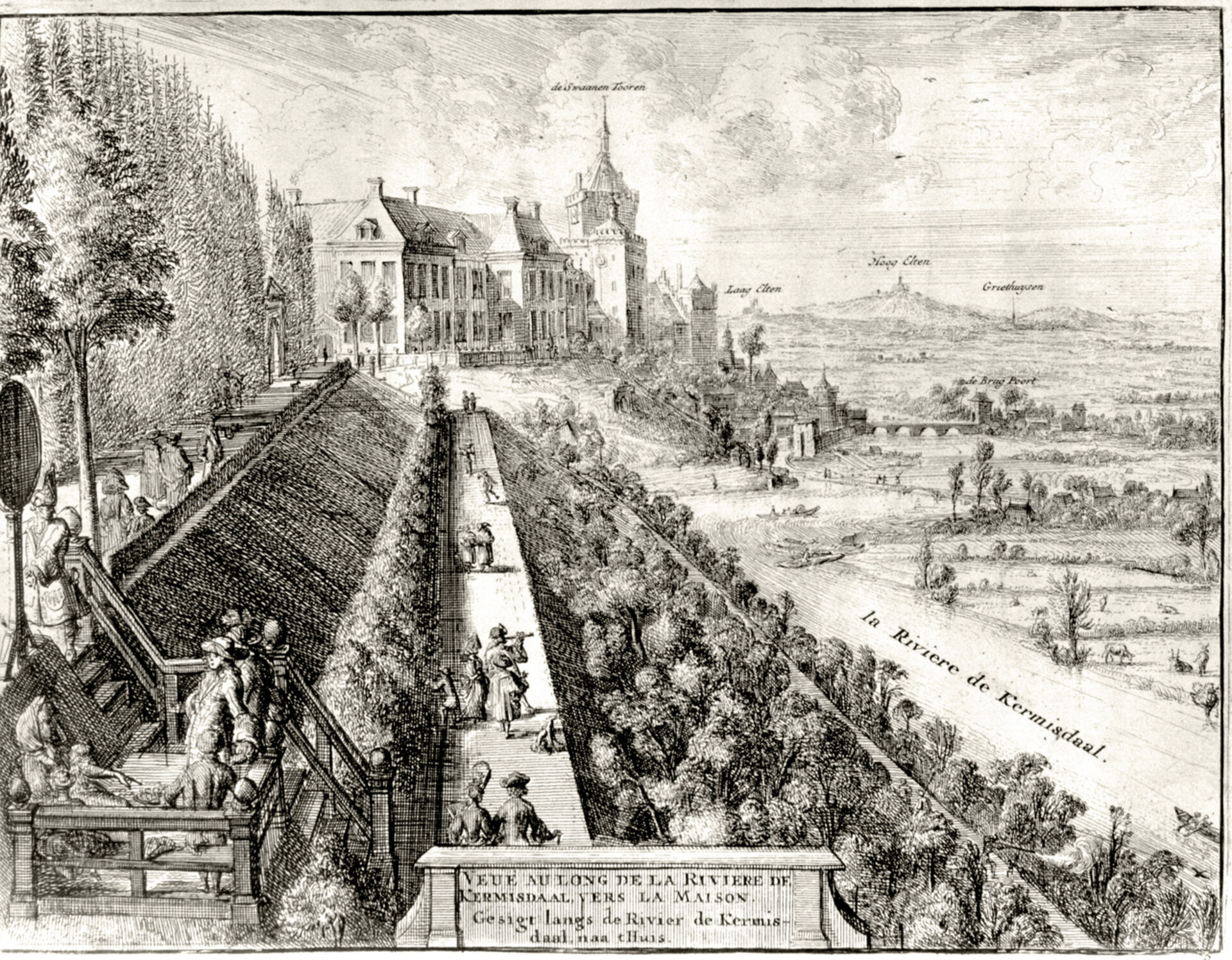
View of the Prinzenhof palace and Schwanenburg castle in the back by Romeyn de Hooghe (between 1685 and 1695)

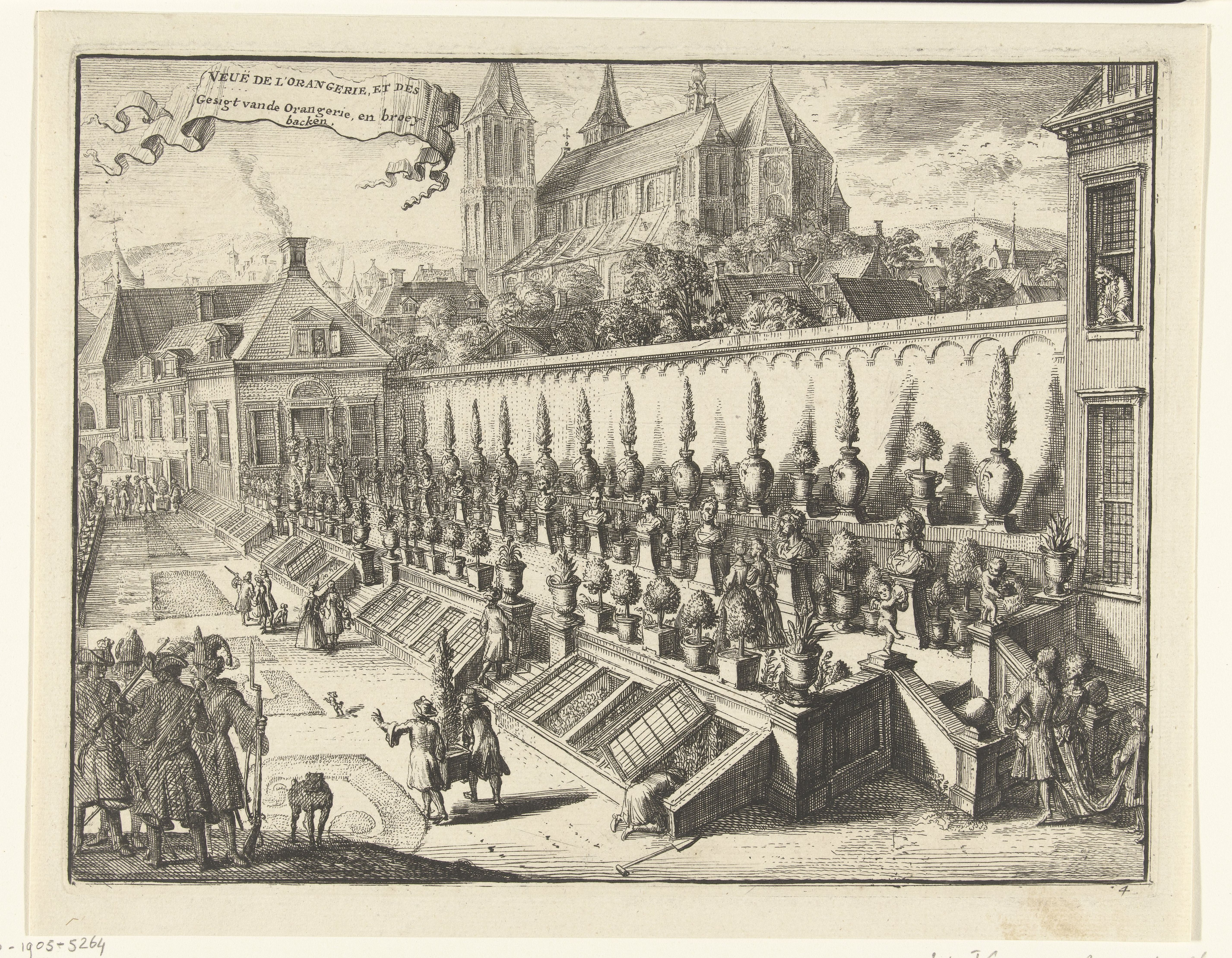
The orangery of the Prinzenhof palace by Romeyn de Hooghe (between 1685 and 1695)

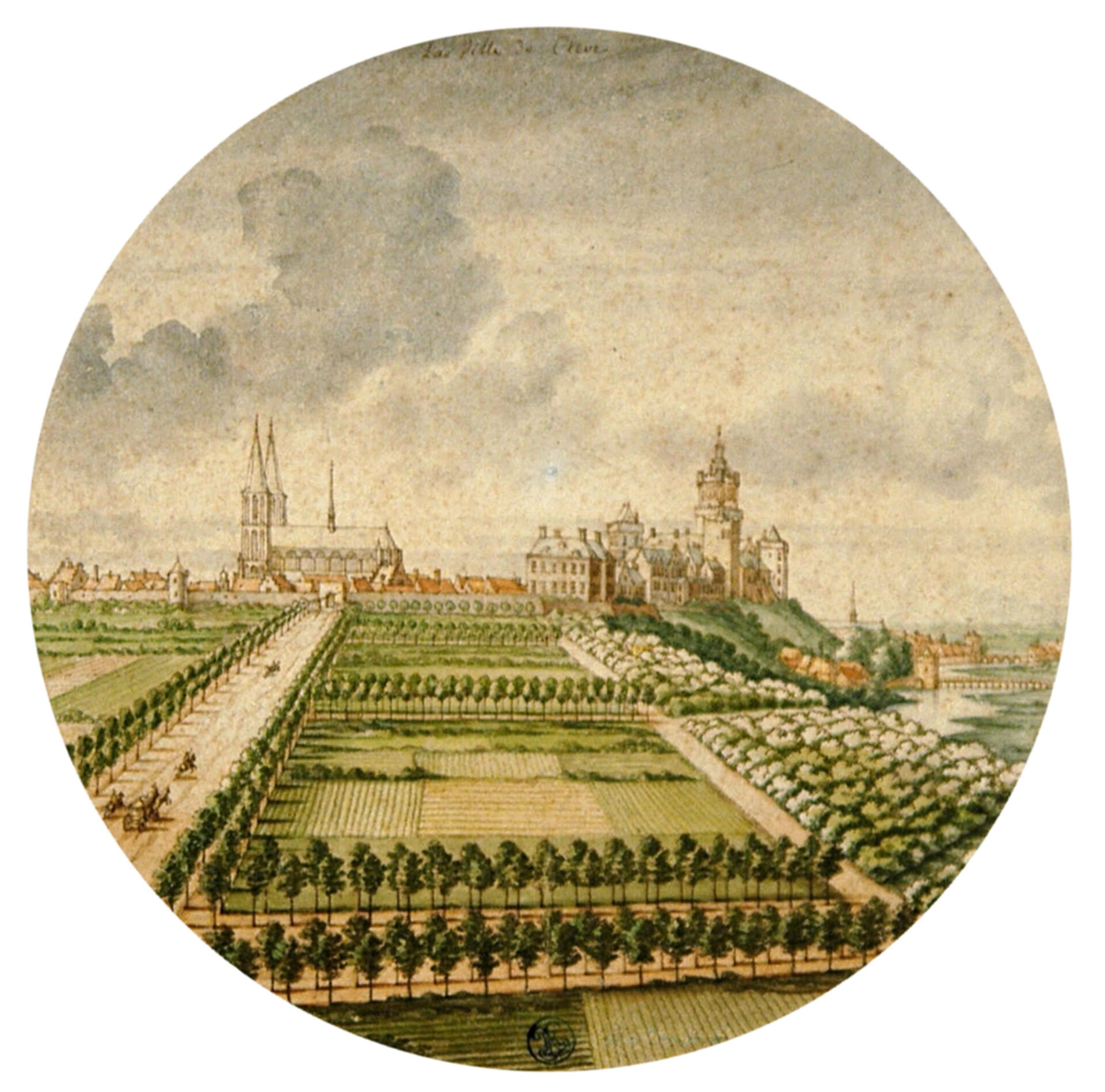
View of the Prinzenhof palace, Schwanenburg castle and the Klever Stiftskirche

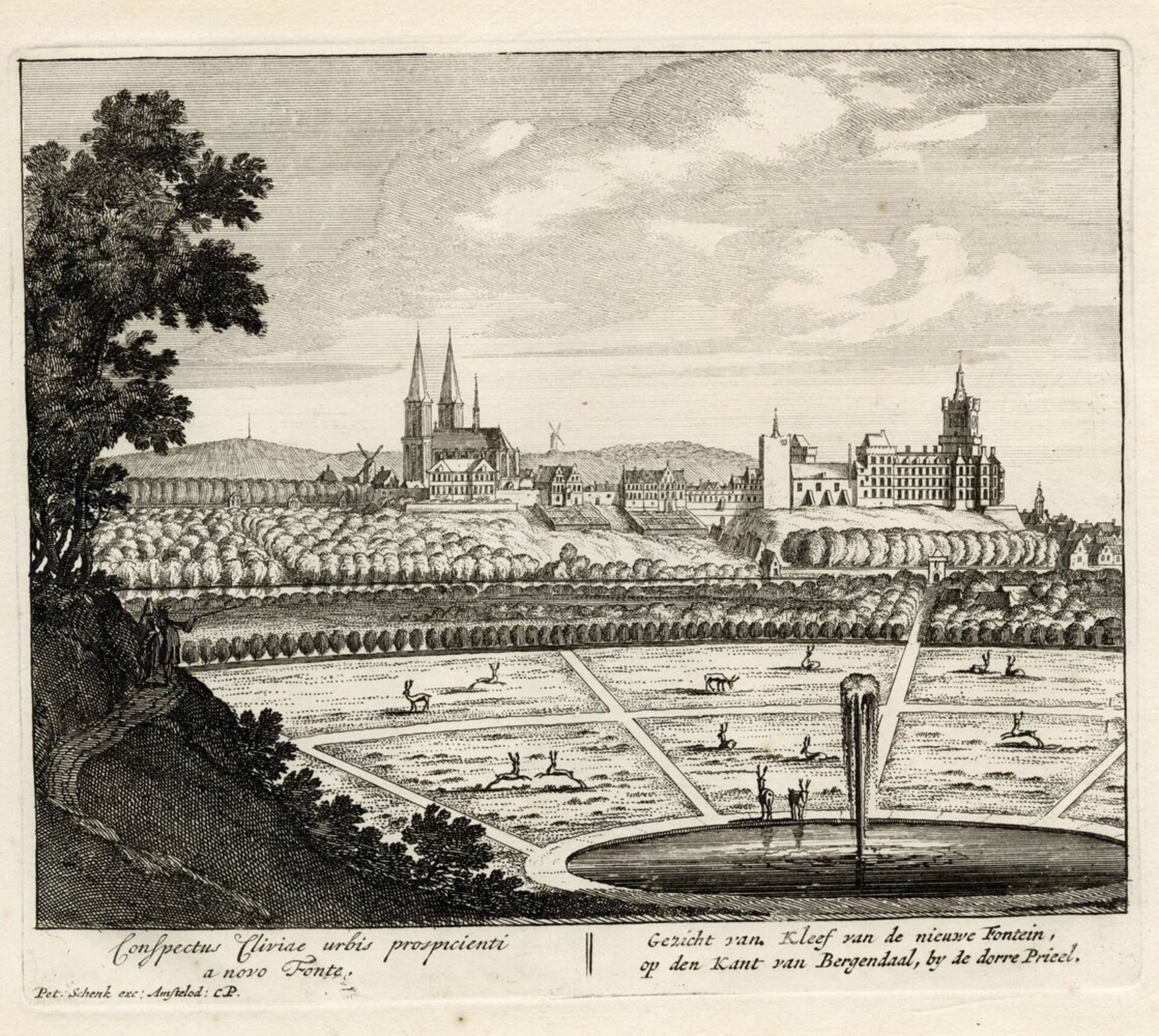
1680 View of Kleve with the Schwanenburg and the Prinzenhof palace (with the Stiftskirche right behind it)

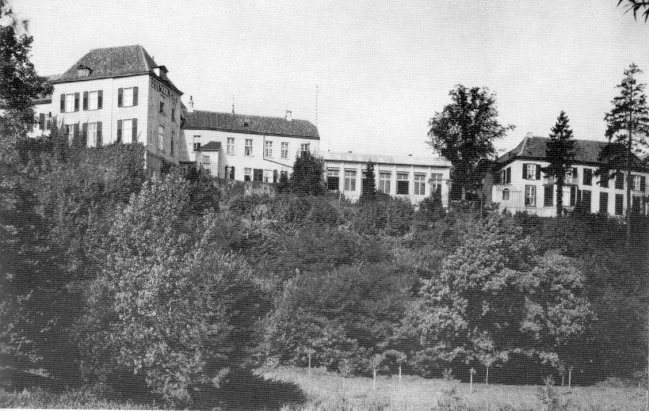
The Prinzenhof palace in 1890 when it had become a hotel

John Maurice, count and (from 1664) prince of Nassau-Siegen, was a distinguished member of the House of Nassau, and a prominent military leader and governor. He played a significant role in the governance and defence of Dutch territories. From 1636 to 1644, he served as governor of Dutch Brazil. After returning to Europe, he accepted in 1648 the post of governor of Cleves, Mark and Ravensberg, and later also of Minden, acting on behalf of Frederick William, Elector of Brandenburg, who had recently married John Maurice's niece Louise.

During his governorship, John Maurice transformed Kleve into a flourishing center of arts, architecture, and culture. The main ducal palace, the Schwanenburg Castle, was renovated by Dutch architect Pieter Post between 1663 and 1666, and a large Evangelical church was constructed as part of these efforts. The Prinzenhof, meaning "Prince’s Court," was built as his residence during this period on grounds provided by the Elector to the Prince (for his lifetime). The location was overlooking the Kermisdahl river, an old branch of the Rhine, which runs through Kleve. While the architect is not definitively known, it is widely believed to be Maurits Post, the son of Pieter Post, who also co-designed John Maurice's residence in The Hague, the Mauritshuis. Post was assisted by Daniel Dopf, who supervised the building works.

After the completion of the Prinzenhof Palace, Prince John Maurice rarely used it, as he was actively serving as Dutch Field Marshal during the Franco-Dutch War. From 1671 to 1676, he was absent from Kleve. Upon his return, he chose to spend his final years at his newly built country house in Kleve, Bergendael.

After John Maurice’s time, the Prinzenhof’s importance gradually declined over times. By the 19th century, it had lost its function and was transformed into a hotel. Around 1900, the hotel was extended, but it was not a success. During World War II, Kleve suffered extensive bombings, with over 90% of the city center destroyed, including the Prinzenhof. The palace was never rebuilt after the war.

Museumslandschaft Hessen Kassel has a collection of drawings and construction plans of the Prinzenhof, dating from the 17th century.

== Architecture ==
The design and architecture of the Prinzenhof Palace align with other residences built by Prince John Maurice, such as the Mauritshuis in The Hague and Sonnenburg Palace in Słońsk. However, the Prinzenhof and Sonnenburg were more modest compared to the more richly decorated Mauritshuis. However, the Prinzenhof was more modern than the Mauritshuis as the staircase was not in the middle but to the side of the main axis, following the latest trends in French architecture of that time. There is also a strong connection with Amerongen Castle, Middachten Castle, Hof te Dieren, and Het Loo Palace in Apeldoorn. These castles and palaces were all created by the same circle of architects and patrons (e.g. the Prince of Orange and his courtiers, like the earls of Athlone), influencing and shaping each other's designs.

== Gardens ==
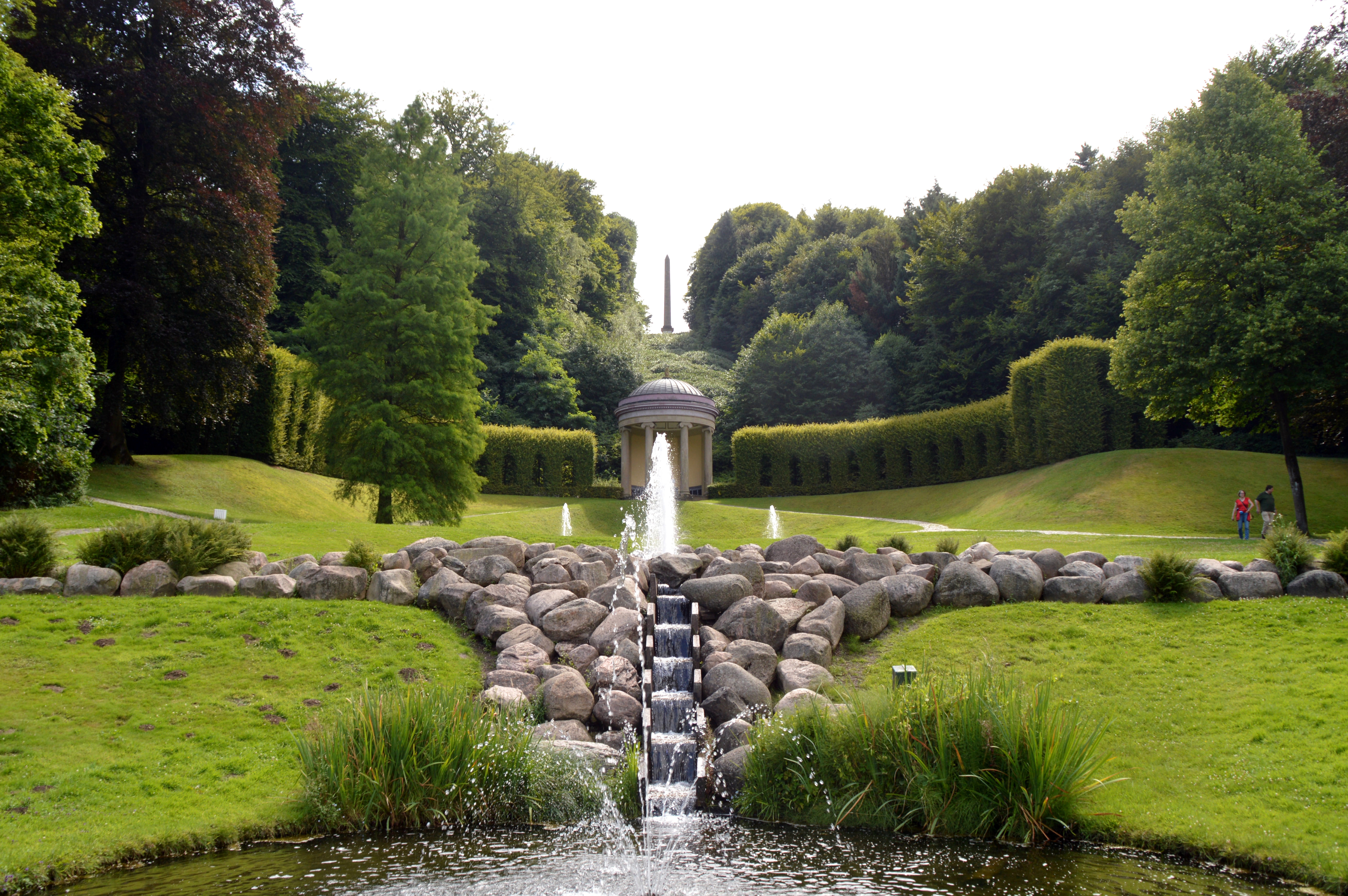
The Tempietto at the gardens

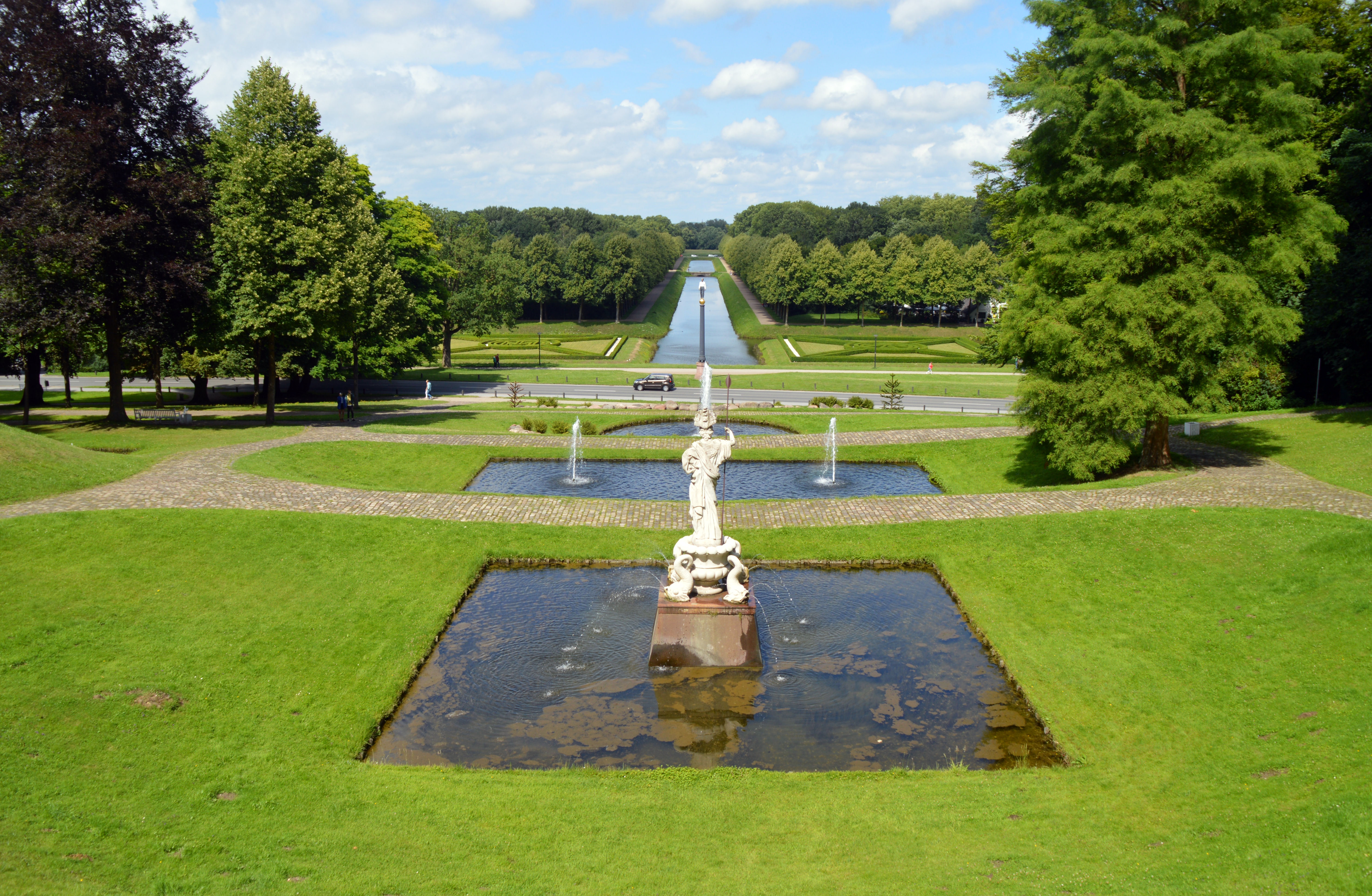
The Amphitheatre

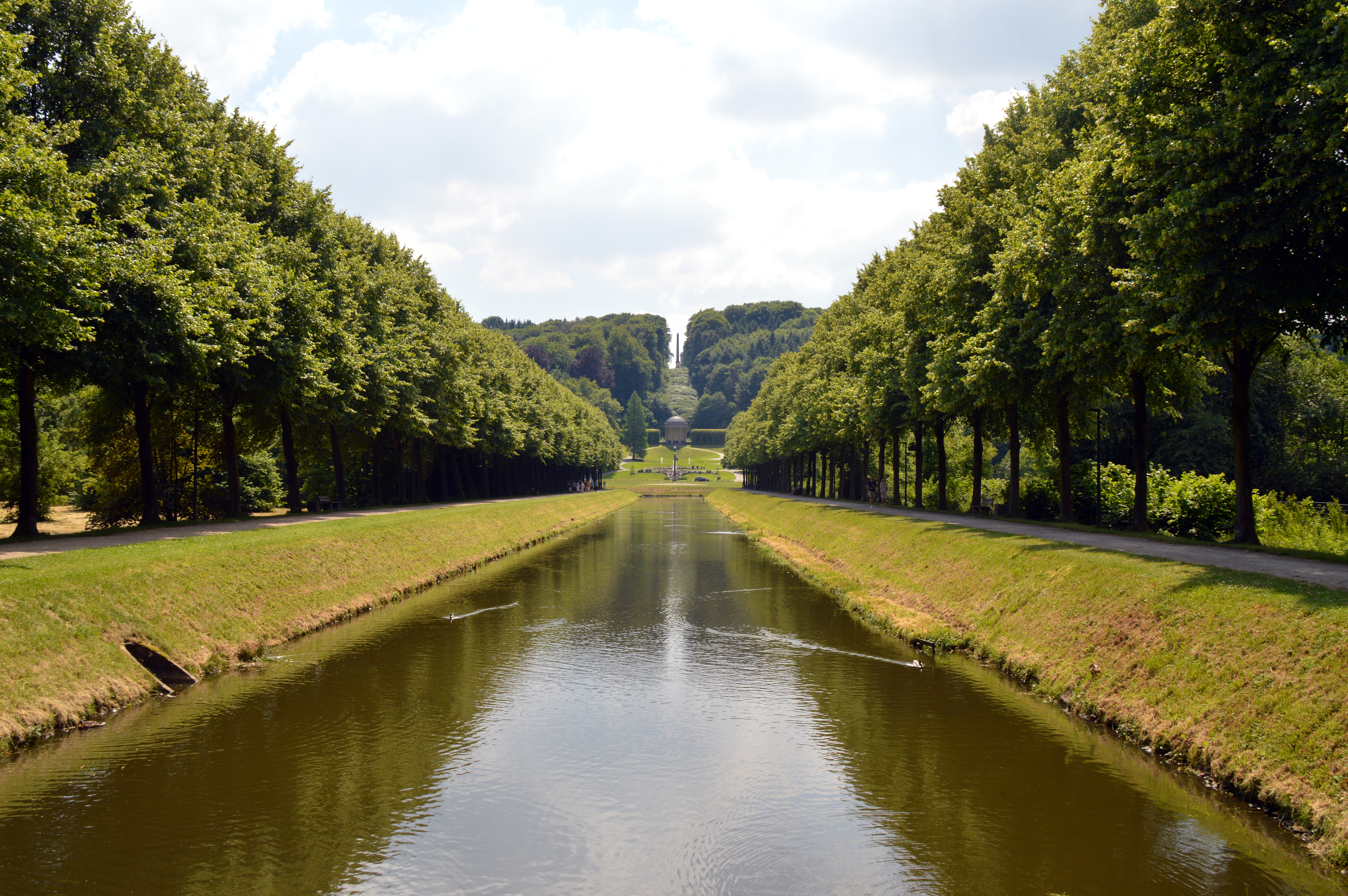
Prince Moritz Canal

The Prinzenhof was not only a residence, but also part of the baroque gardens and landscape that John Maurice created in and around Kleve, which are considered to be fine examples of baroque garden architecture in the Rhineland.

After assuming office in 1647, John Maurice started surrounding Kleve with various gardens, such as the Old and New Tiergarten, and the pleasure garden (German: Lustgarten) next to the Prinzenhof. The designs are likely made by the Dutch architect Jacob van Campen, who also co-designed the Mauritshuis.

The oldest part, the Old Tiergarten, was established in 1650 and extended southeast of Kleve. In 1652, work began on the Pleasure Garden, and by 1653, the New Tiergarten was being developed on the Springenberg, utilizing its natural springs. Johann Moritz’s innovative idea was to integrate these parks with the surrounding landscape, connecting them through a system of star-shaped and parallel avenues, linking the parks and the city. The Nassauer Allee, lined with four rows of linden trees, became a model for Berlin.

The landscape was further integrated through canals and sightlines that directed views to focal points in the surrounding area. The Springenberg, with its springs, became the centerpiece, where a terraced garden resembling an ancient theater with water features was created. By 1656, additional structures like pavilions and water basins were added, including the Prinz-Moritz Canal, which still aligns views toward the Eltenberg and its church.

Although the parks suffered neglect and damage during the War of the Spanish Succession (1702) and the French Revolution (1794), their original layout survived. Important later additions include the Forstgarten by J.E. von Buggenhagen (1784) and the transformation into an English landscape garden by M.F. Weyhe in 1821. Despite many changes, the key characteristics of Johann Moritz’s original concept, particularly the integration of the natural landscape into the park design, remain preserved today.

=== Country Houses Freudenberg and Bergendal ===
The Old Tiergarten also contained two country houses for the prince: Freudenberg and Berg en Dal (English: Mountain and Valley). Freudenberg already burnt down during the lifetime of John Maurice in 1669. Bergendael was a smaller more modest country house, a so-called Hermitage, where the prince spent his last years and died in 1679. A funeral monument remembers of the prince, but his final resting place is not here, but in the princely crypt in Siegen. After 1679, the Bergendael country house fell into a rapid decline.

== Literature ==
- Terwen, J.J. (1979). "Johan Moritz und die Architektur". Soweit der Erdkreis reich. Johann Moritz von Nassau-Siegen 1609-1679 (Exhibition catalogue) (in German). Kleve: Städtische Museum Haus Koekkkoek. pp. 127–143.
- Terwen, J.J. (1979). "The Buildings of Johan Maurits". In van den Boogaart, E. (ed.). Johann Maurits van Nassau-Siegen. A Humanist Prince in Europe and Brazil. Den Haag. pp. 54–104.
- Van der Wyck, Henri (1986). Het Prinsenhof te Kleef = Der Klever Prinzenhof (in Dutch). Alphen aan den Rijn: Canaletto. p. 16.
- Der Lustgarten des Fürsten Johann Moritz von Nassau-Siegen in Kleve (PDF) (in German). Kleve: Klevischer Verein für Kultur und Geschichte e.V. Arbeitskreis Kermisdahl-Wetering. 2020. p. 22.

== Gallery: Drawings and plans from the museum collections in Kassel ==
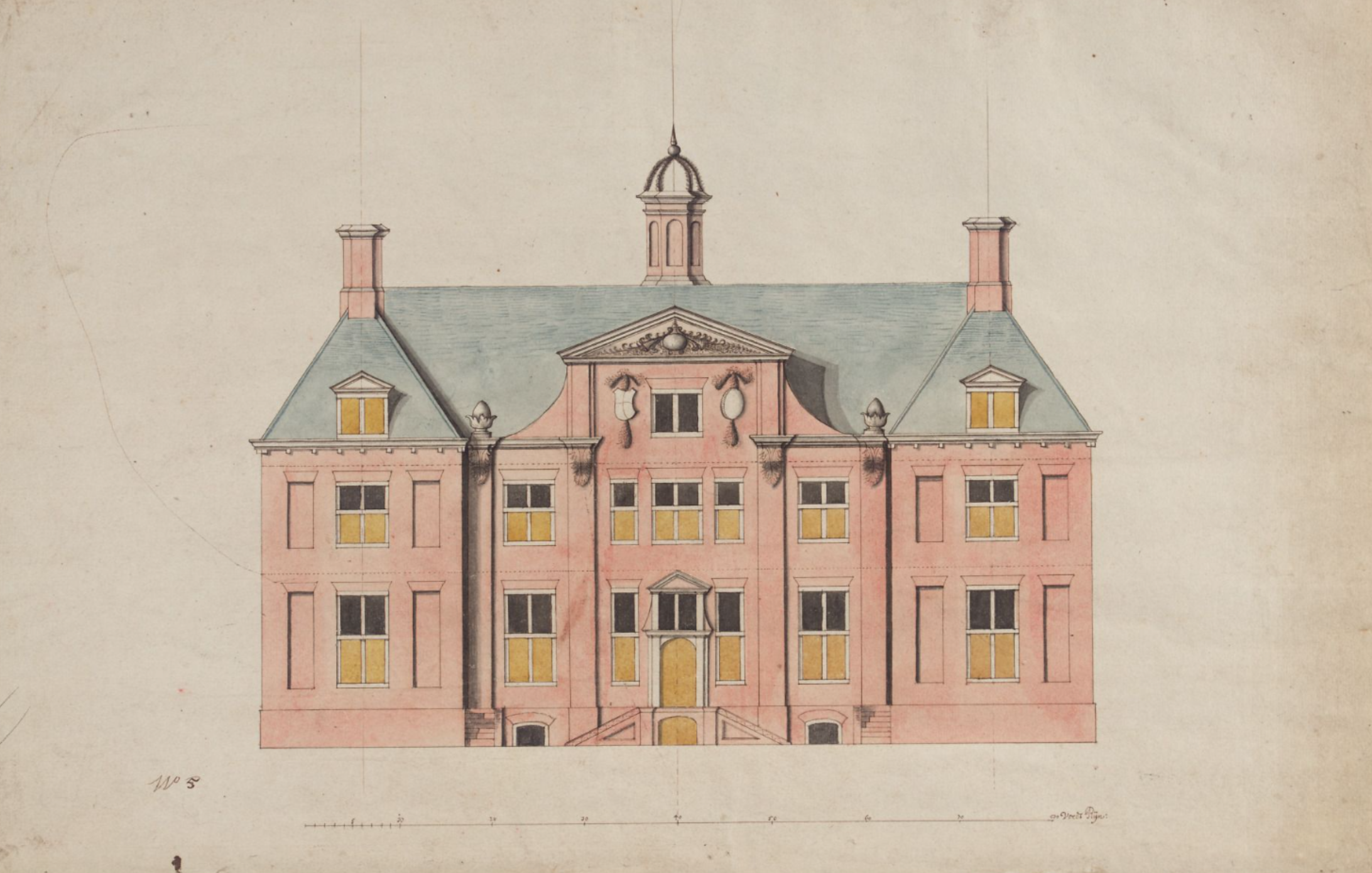
Design for the front of the Prinzenhof palace. Drawing by Daniel Wolf von Dopf (1671)

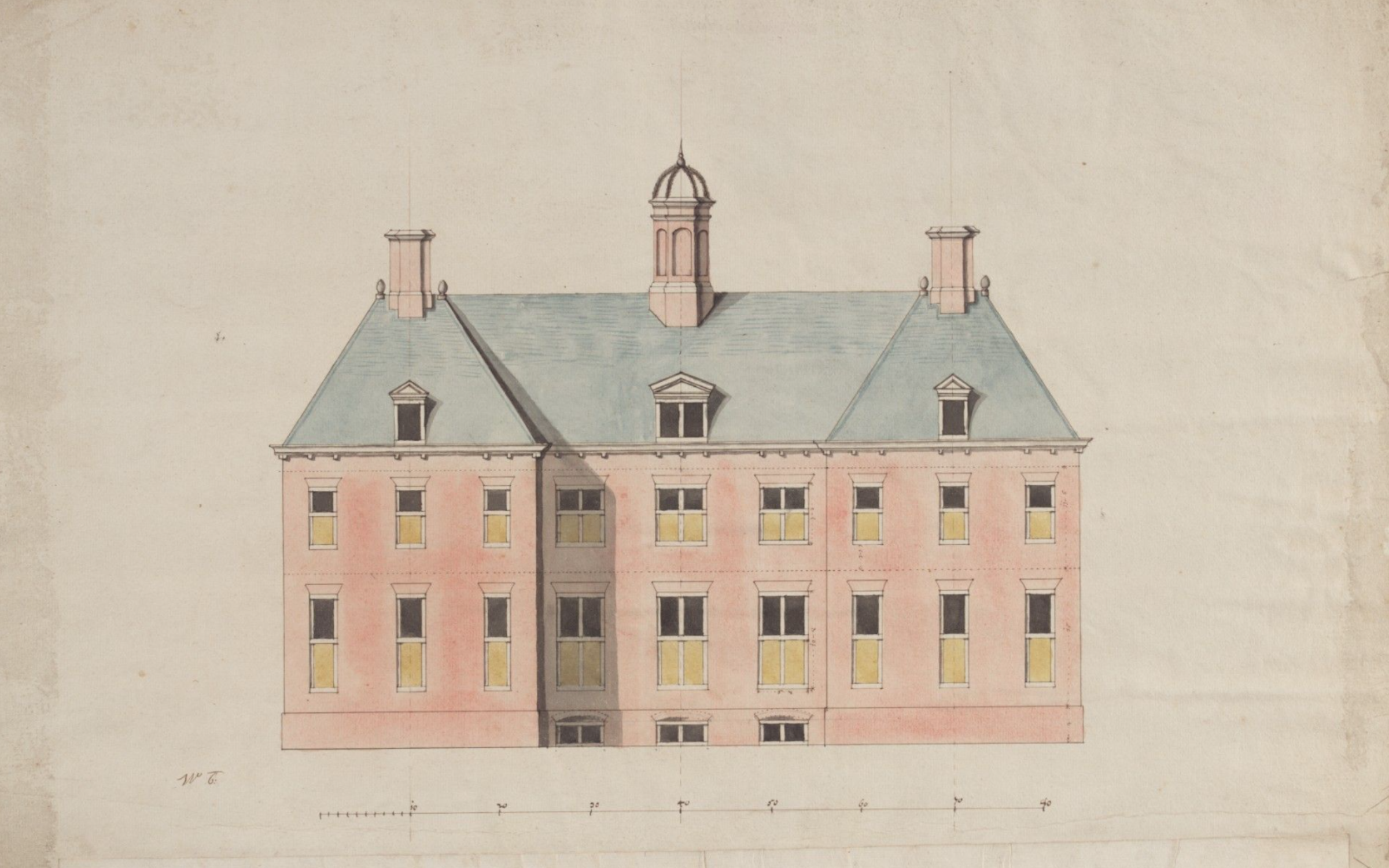
Design for the garden façade of the Prinzenhof palace, which faces the Rhine valley. Drawing by Daniel Wolf von Dopf (1671)

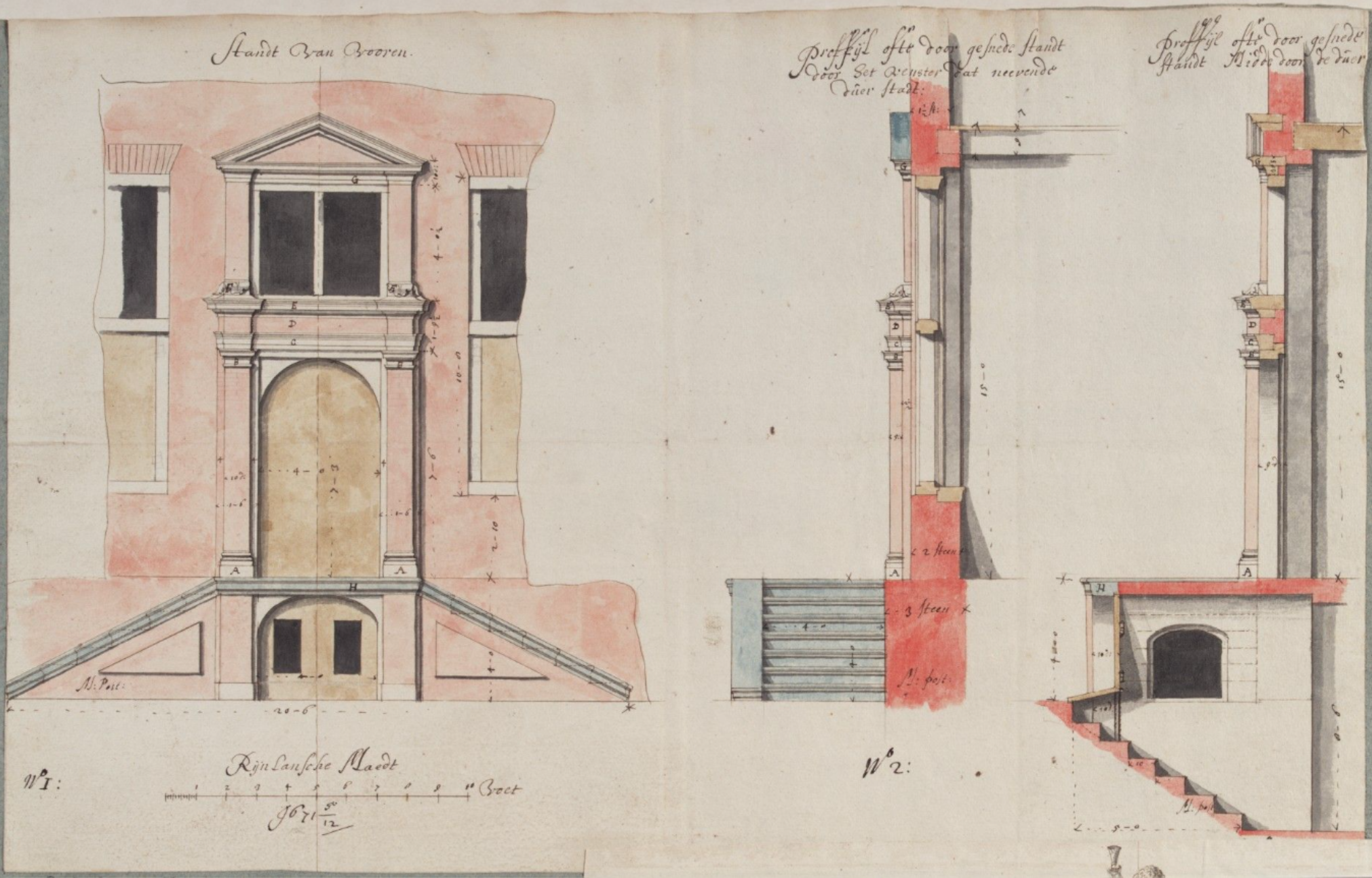
Design for the main entrance by Maurits Post (1671)

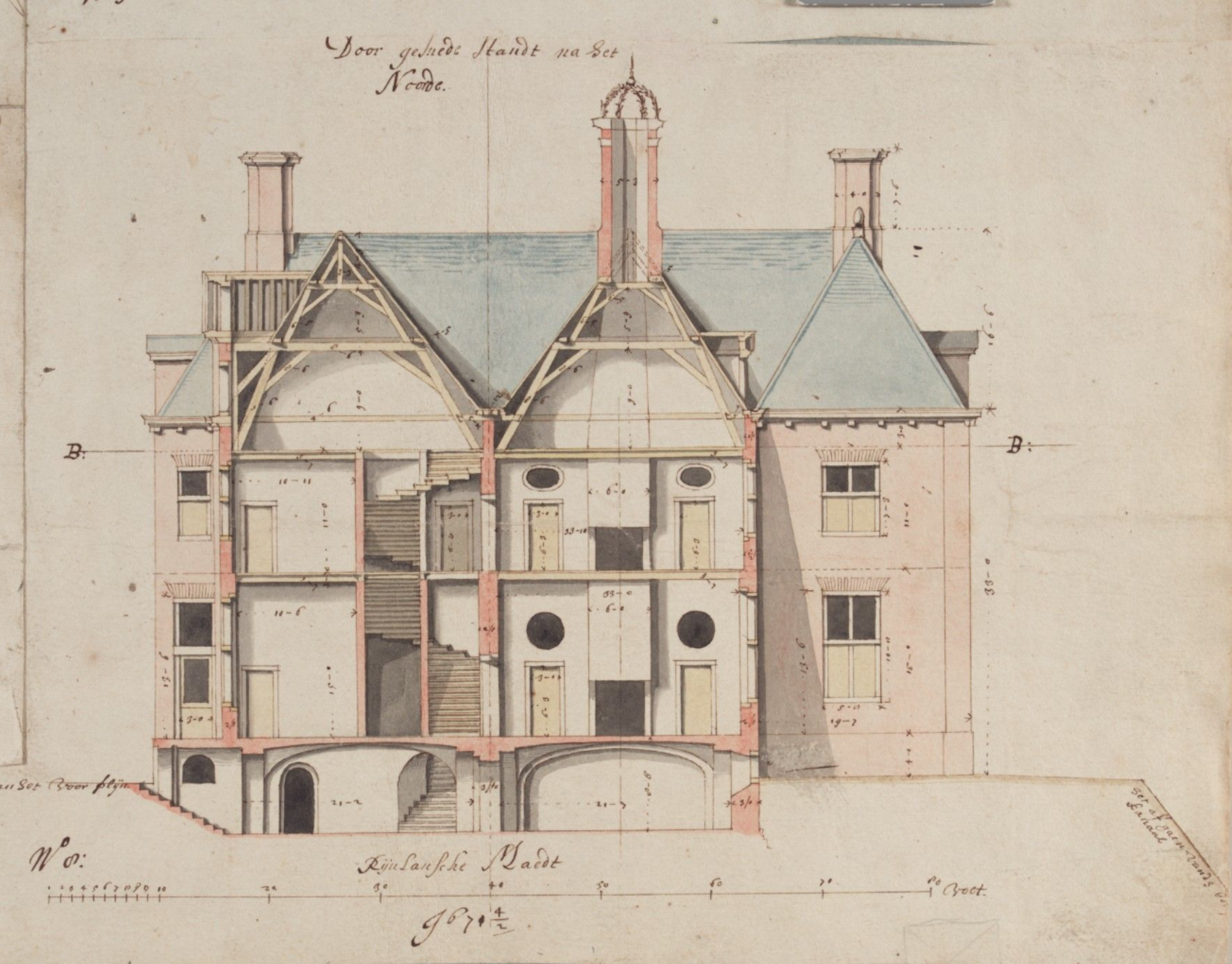
Cross section of the Prinzenhof palace by Maurits Post (1671)

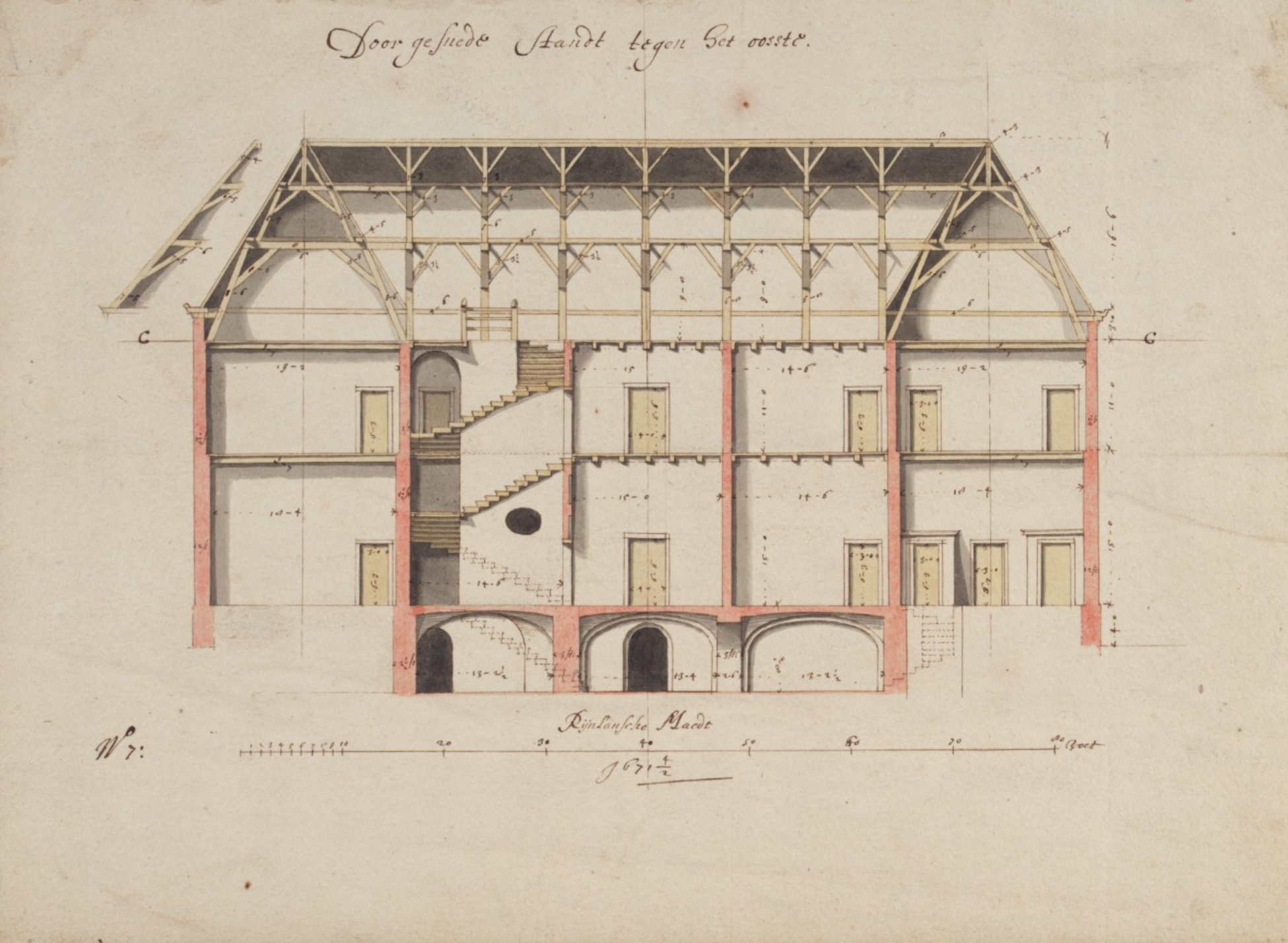
Cross section of the Prinzenhof palace by Maurits Post (1671)

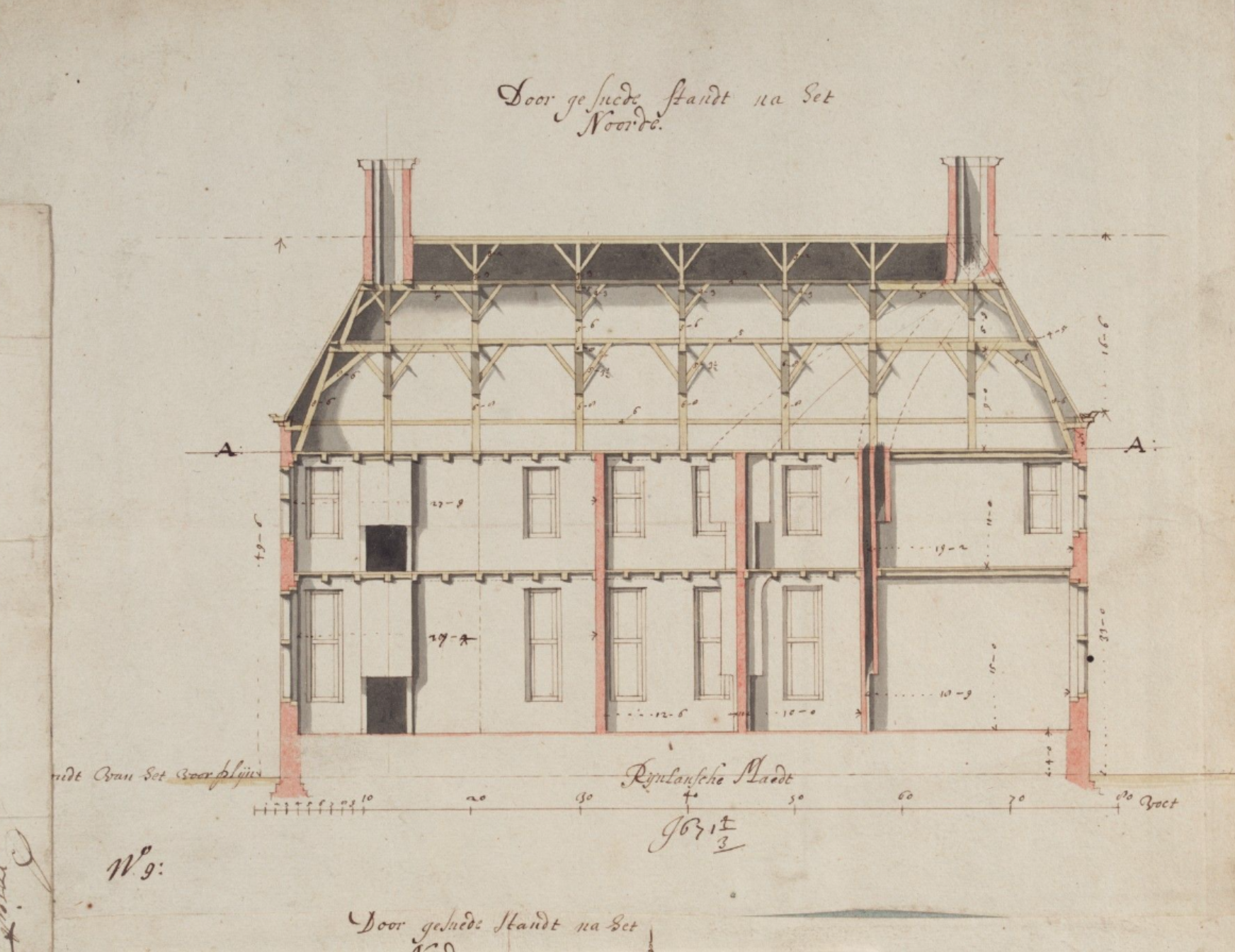
Cross section of the Prinzenhof palace by Maurits Post (1671)

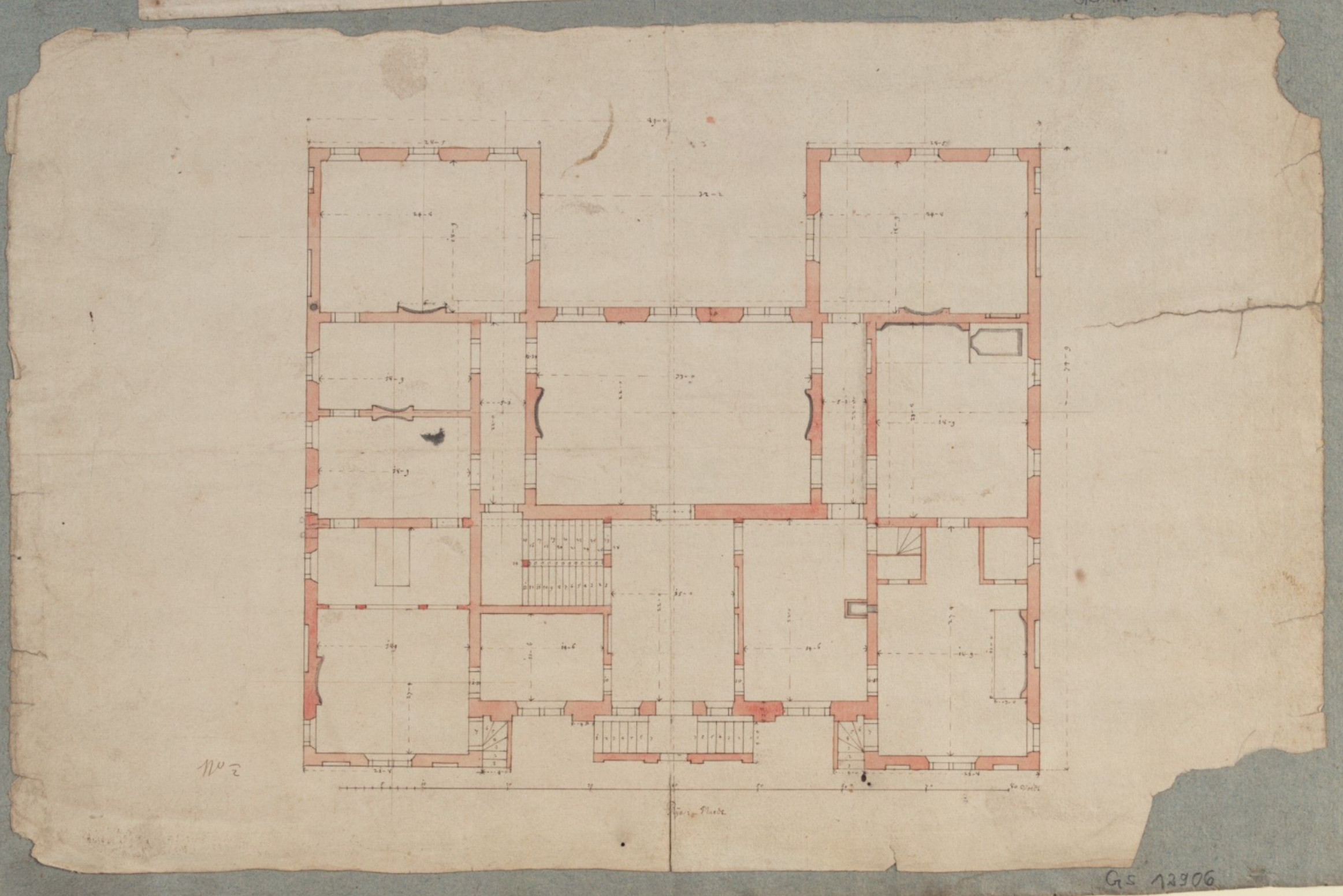
Design for the ground floor by Maurits Post (1671)

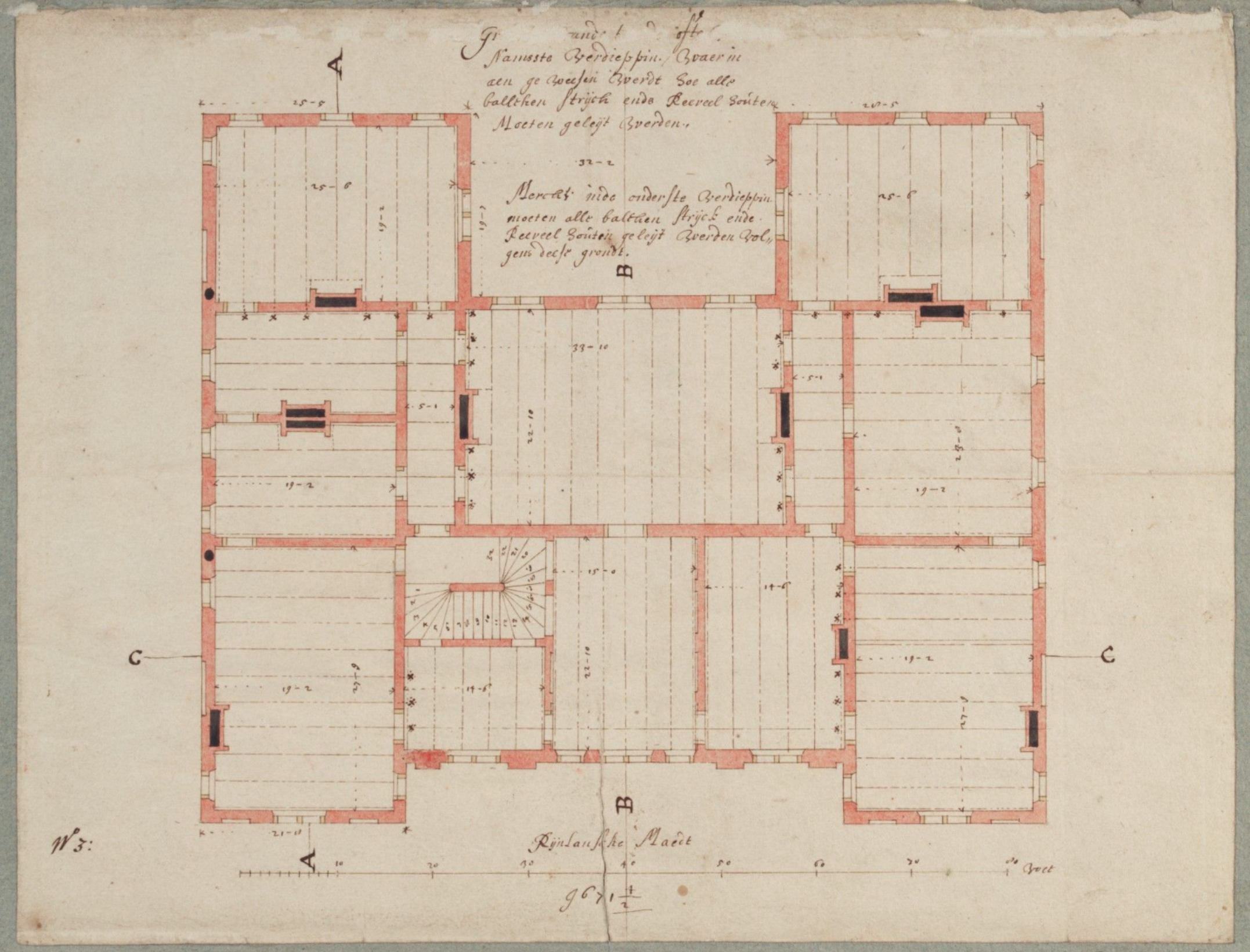
Design for the first floor by Maurits Post (1671)

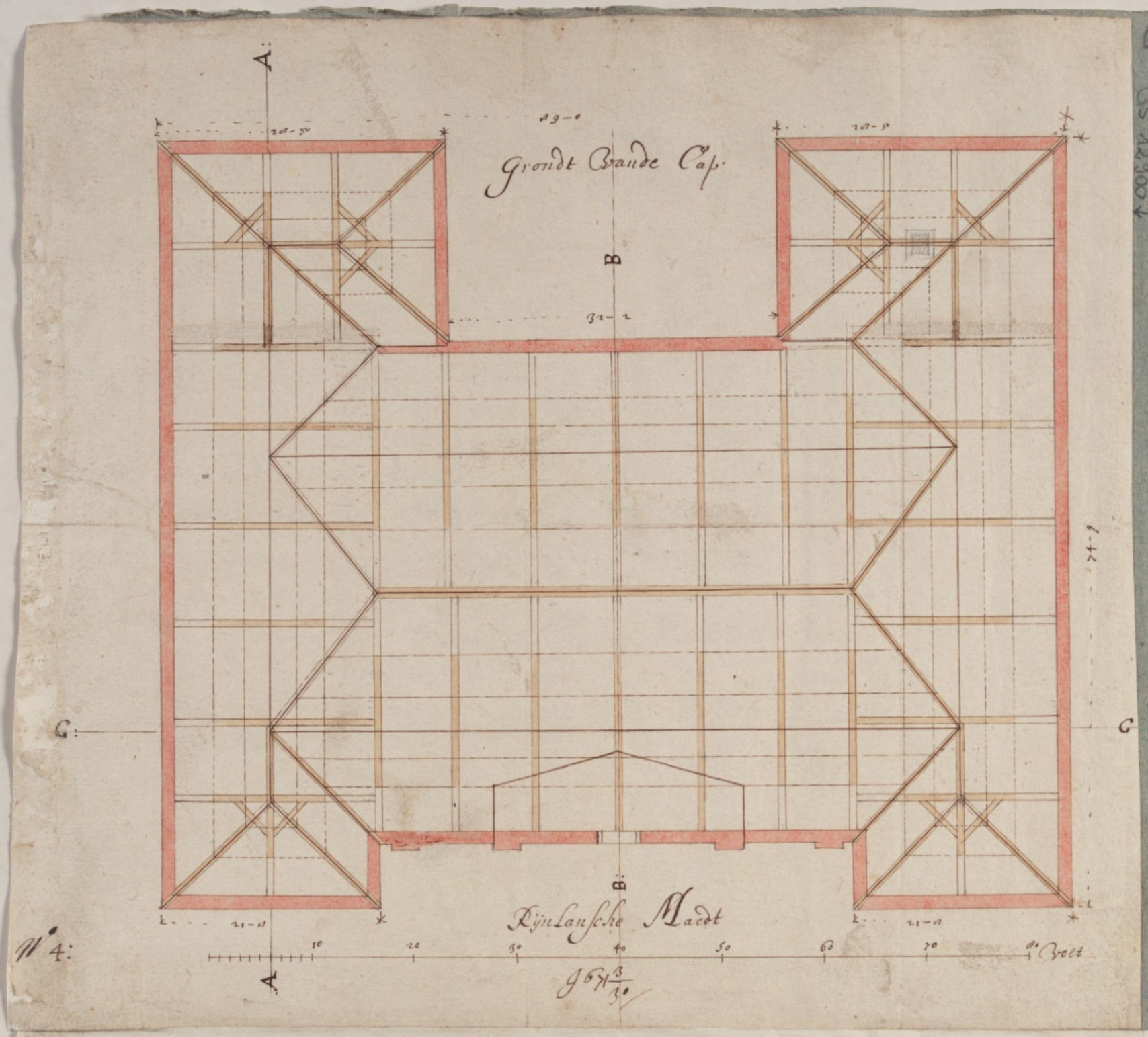
Design for the attic by Maurits Post (1671)

== Gallery: Prinzenhof – Part of Dutch baroque tradition of castles and palaces ==
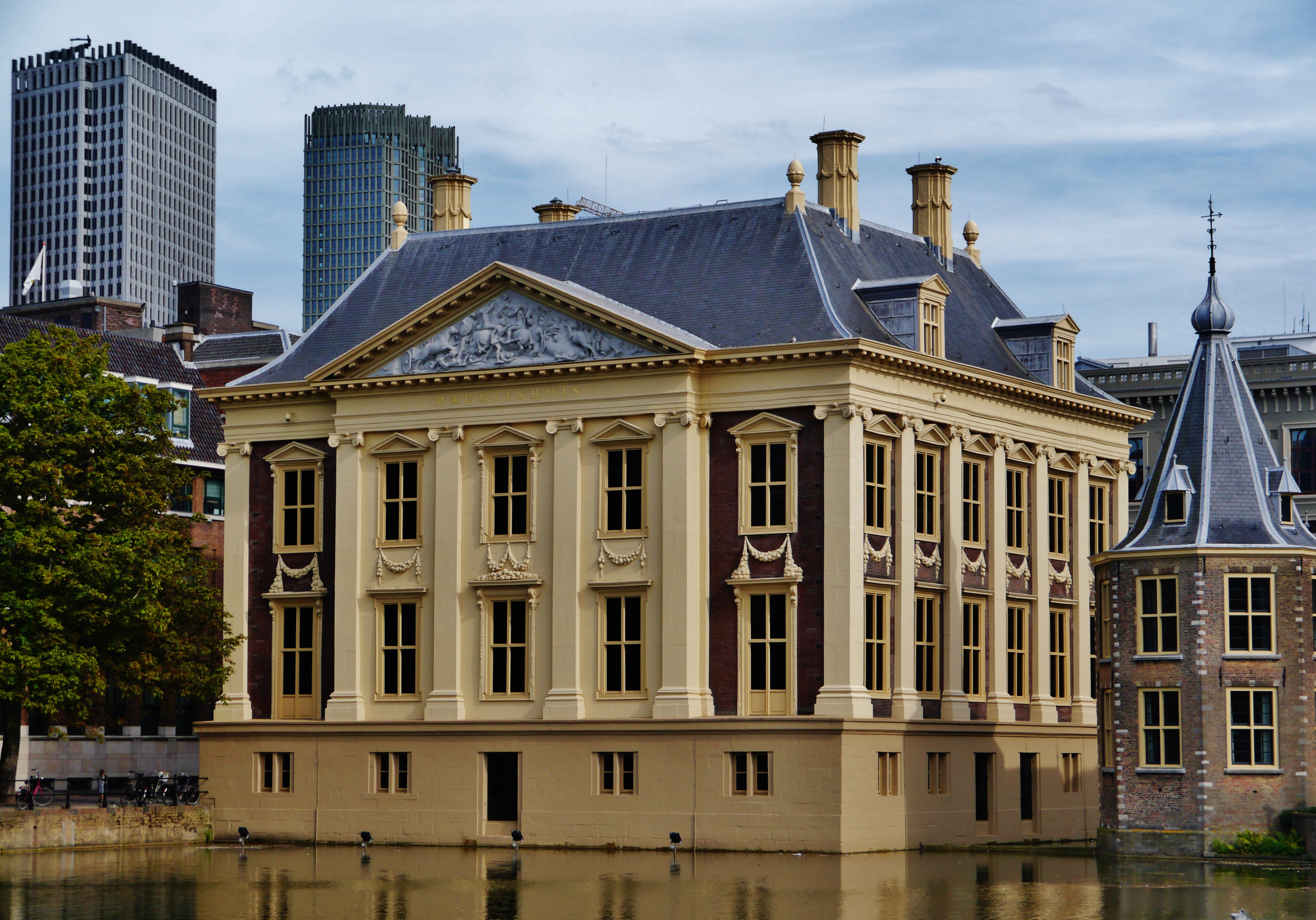
Mauritshuis

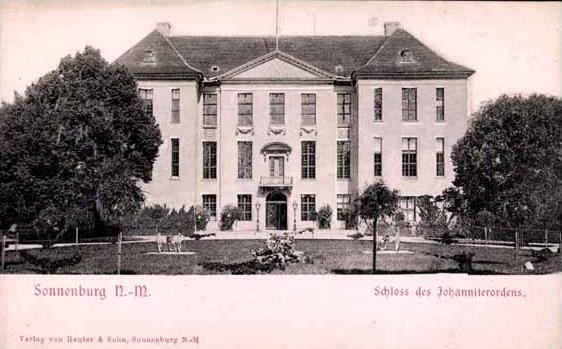
Sonnenburg palace

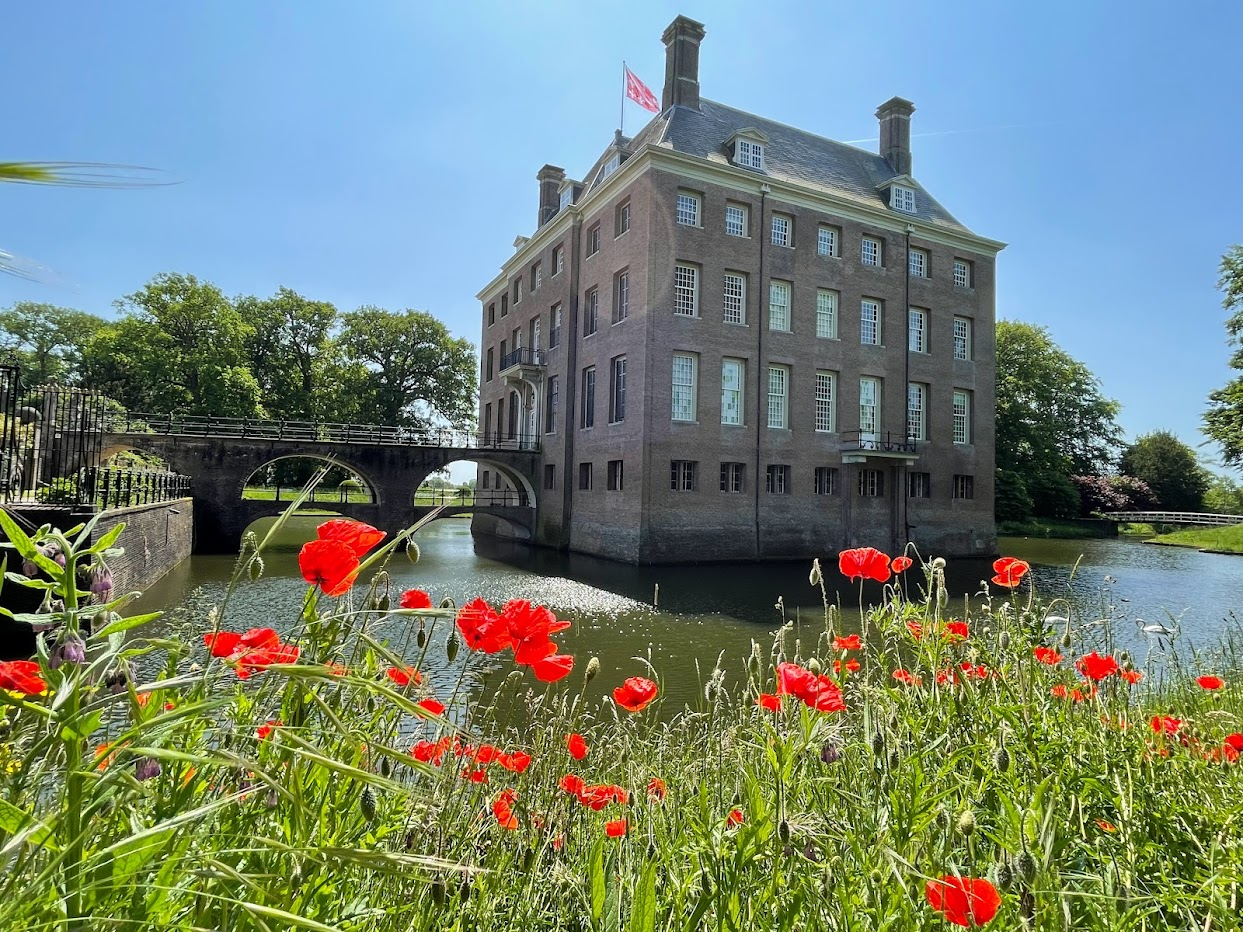
Amerongen Castle

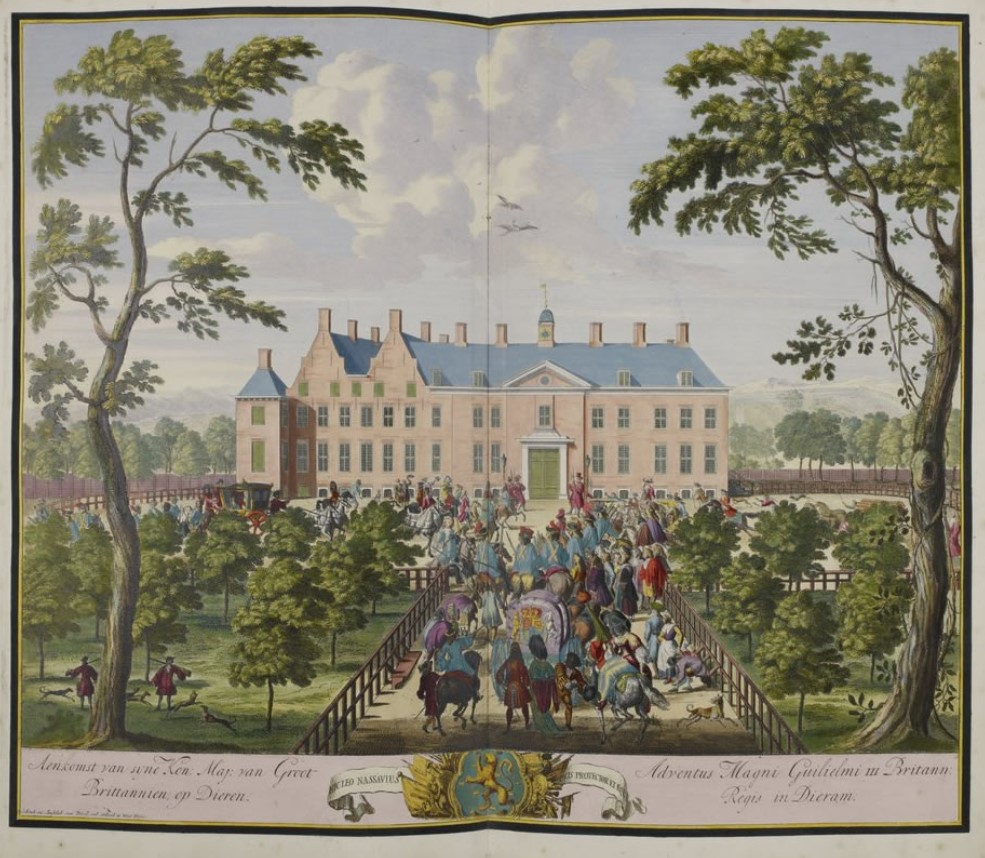
Hof te Dieren

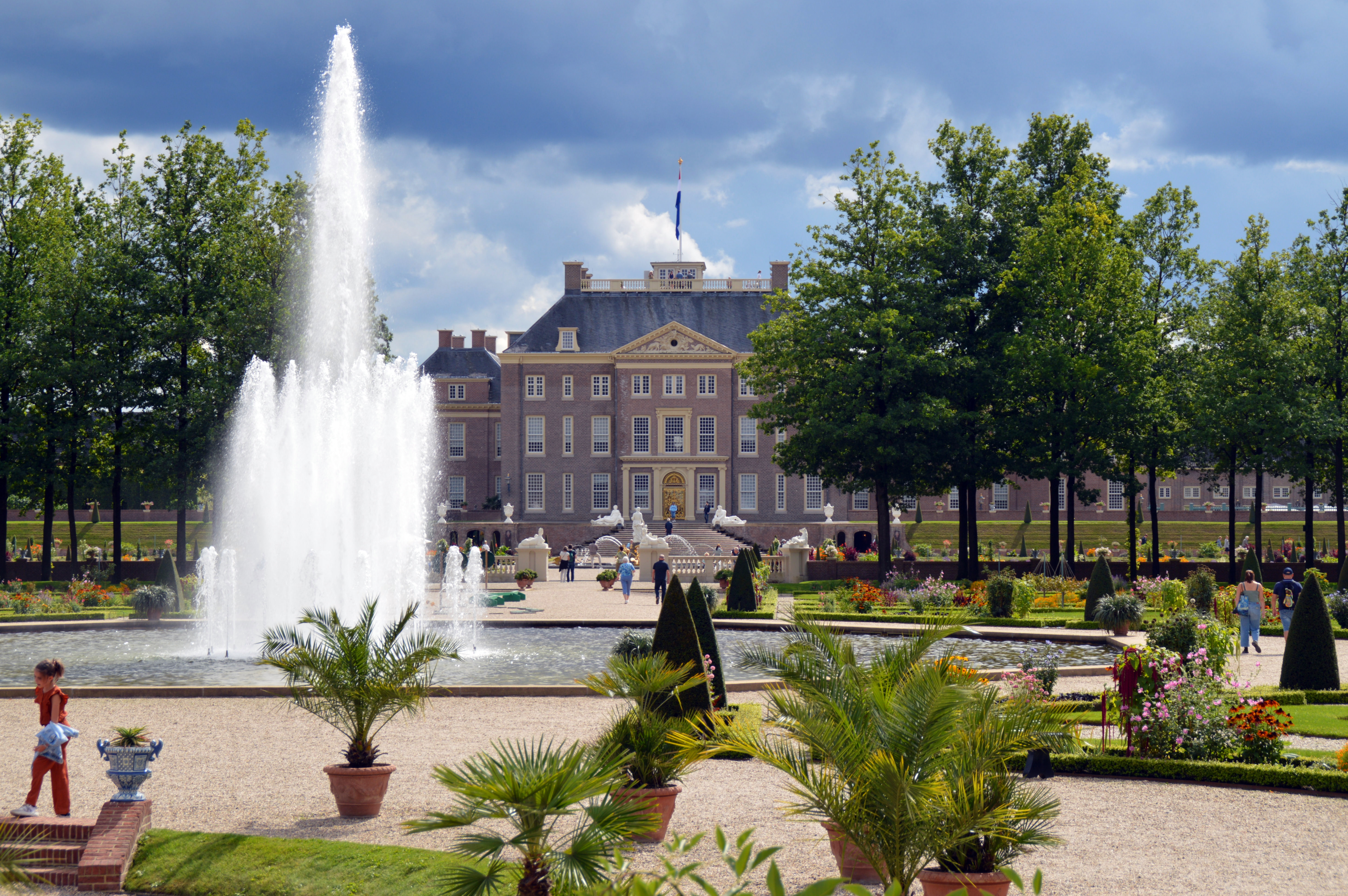
Het Loo Palace

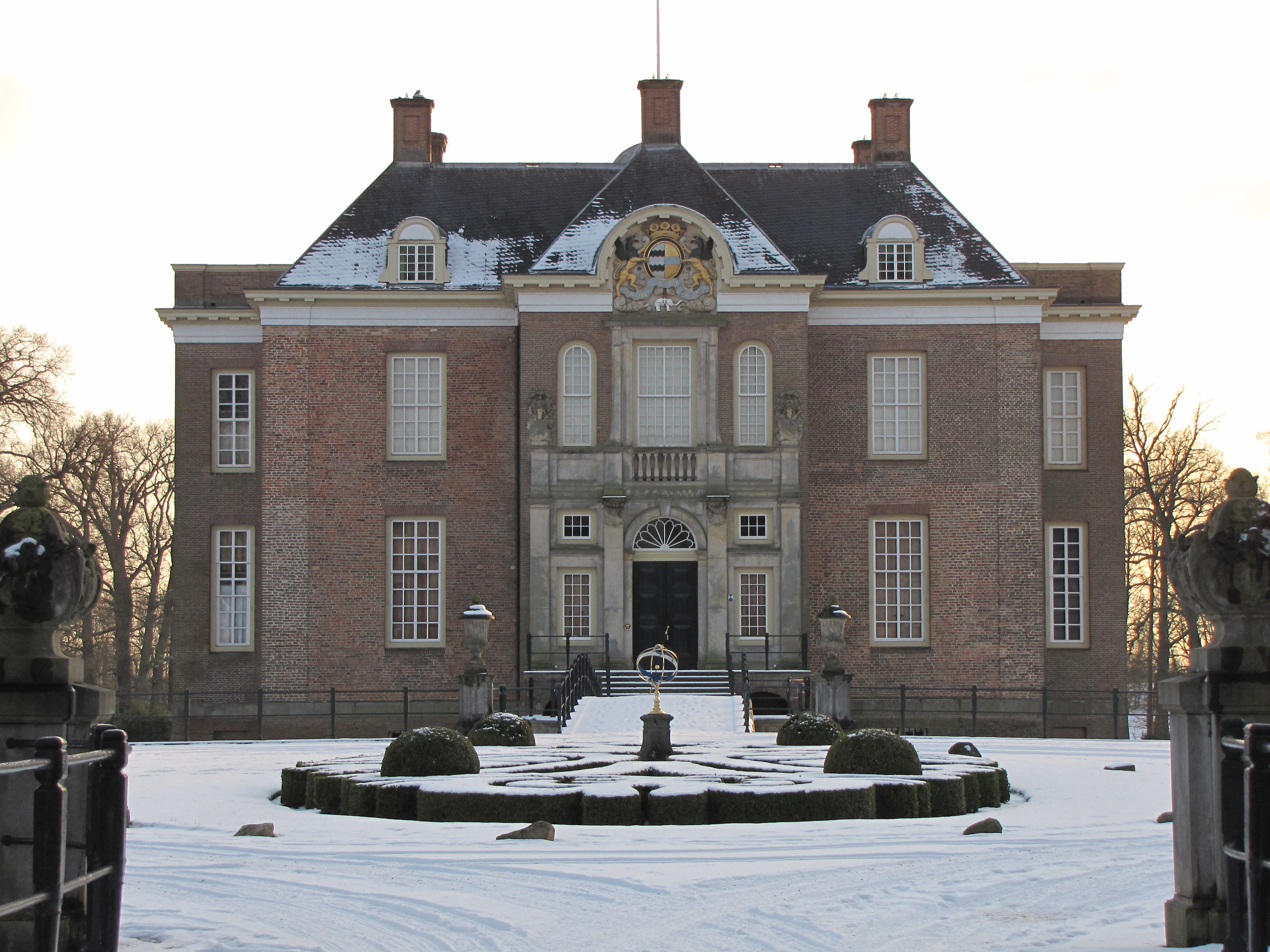
Middachten castle
