= Andrieskerk =

Church in Utrechtse Heuvelrug, Netherlands

Coordinates: 51.9980°N 5.4615°E

The Andrieskerk ("St. Andrew's church") is a nowadays Protestant church in the Dutch village of Amerongen. The church's history spans around seven centuries, beginning in the end of the 13th century, when everybody in western Europe had to be Roman Catholic. With the Reformation, the church became Protestant in 1582. It is currently used by the Reformed Municipal Parish of Amerongen.

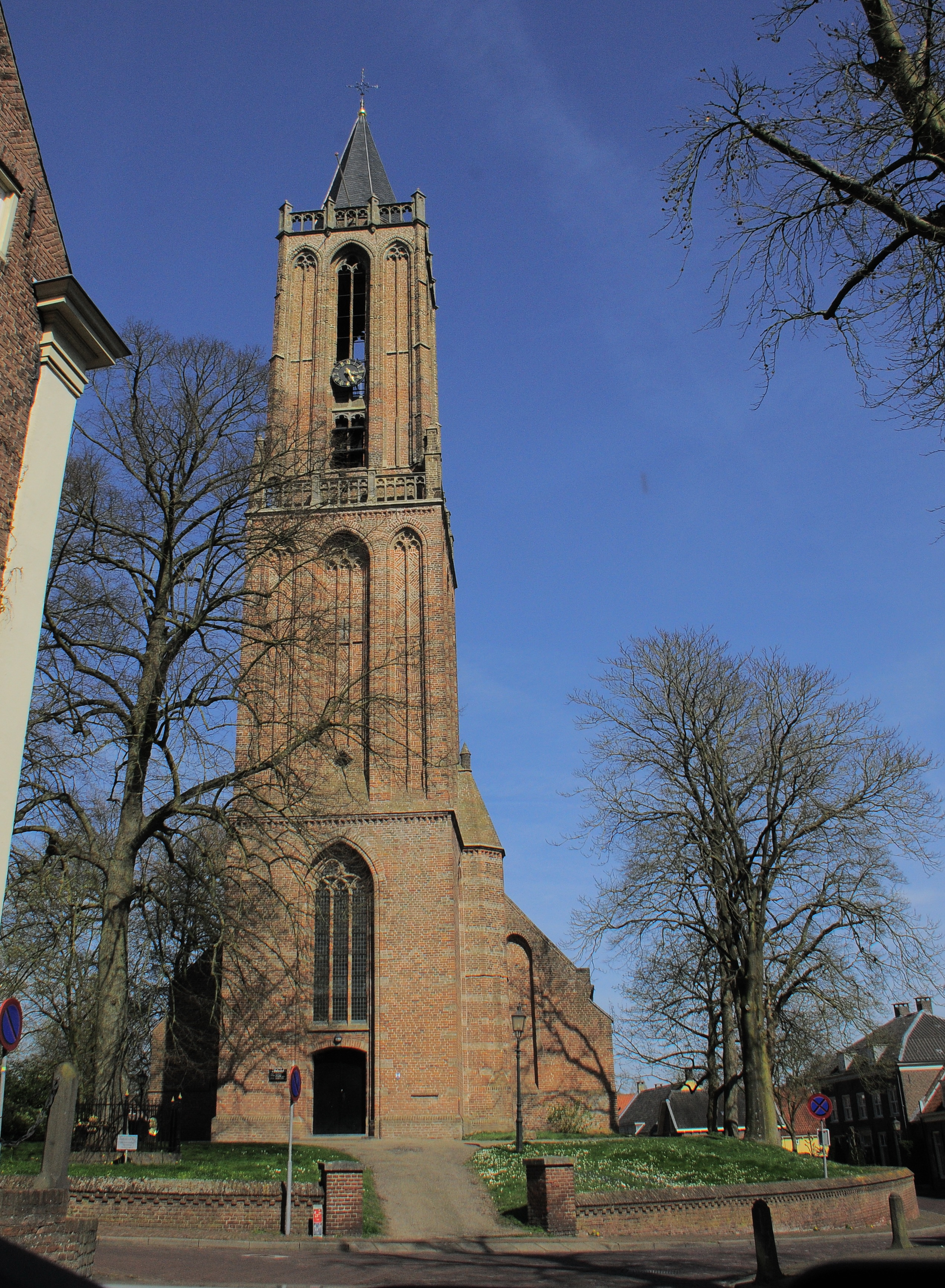
Andrieskerk from the west

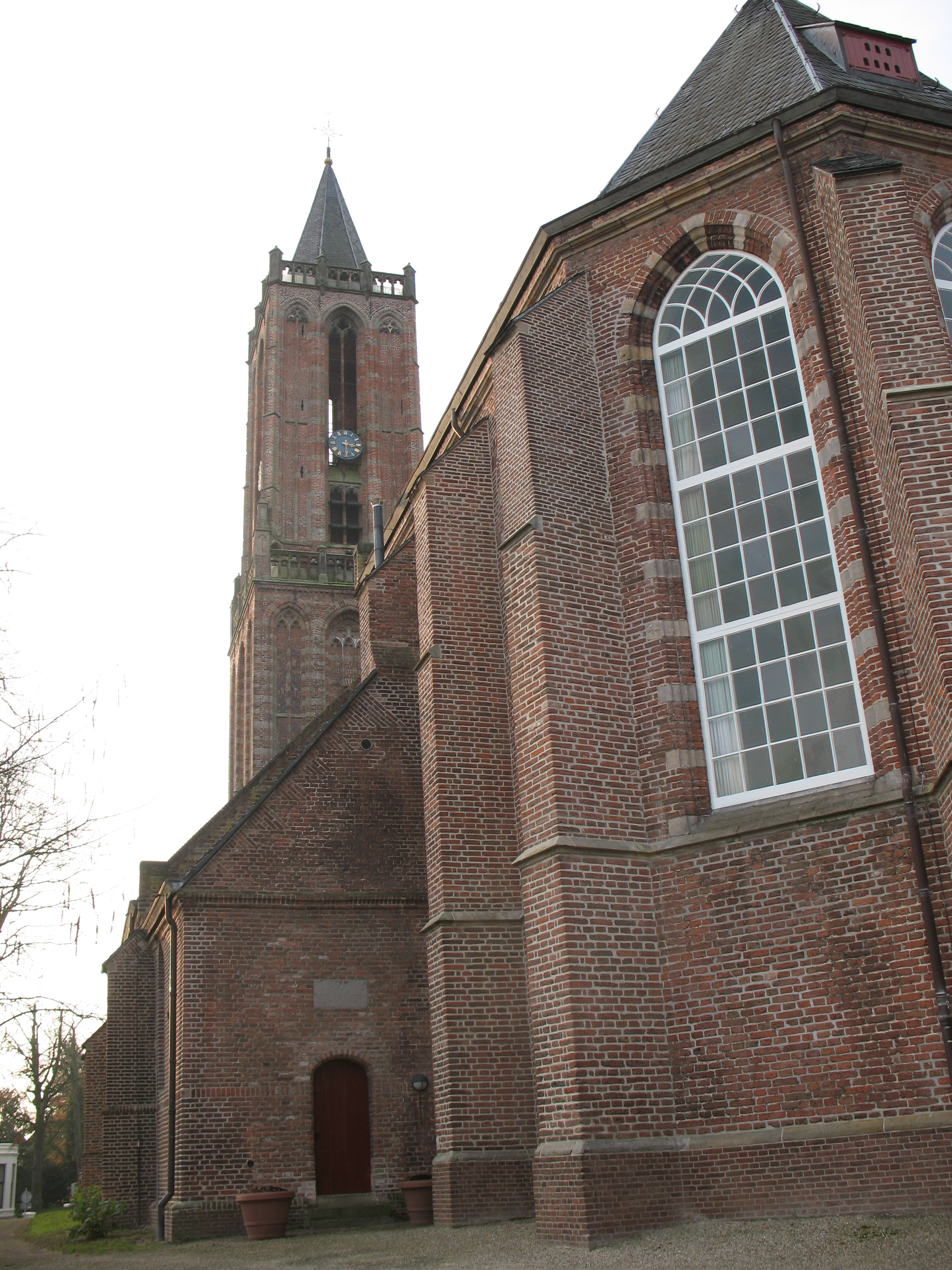
Andrieskerk from the east
