= Technivorm =

Dutch manufacturer of drip coffee machines and coffee grinders

Technivorm is a family-owned Dutch manufacturer founded by Gerard-Clement Smit in Amerongen, The Netherlands. It produces Moccamaster, a drip coffee maker designed in 1968 and first released in 1969. In 2017, the 10-millionth Moccamaster was sold. As of 2019, Technivorm and Moccamaster have approximately 200 employees.

All Moccamaster coffee machines are made in Amerongen, The Netherlands.

== Moccamaster ==
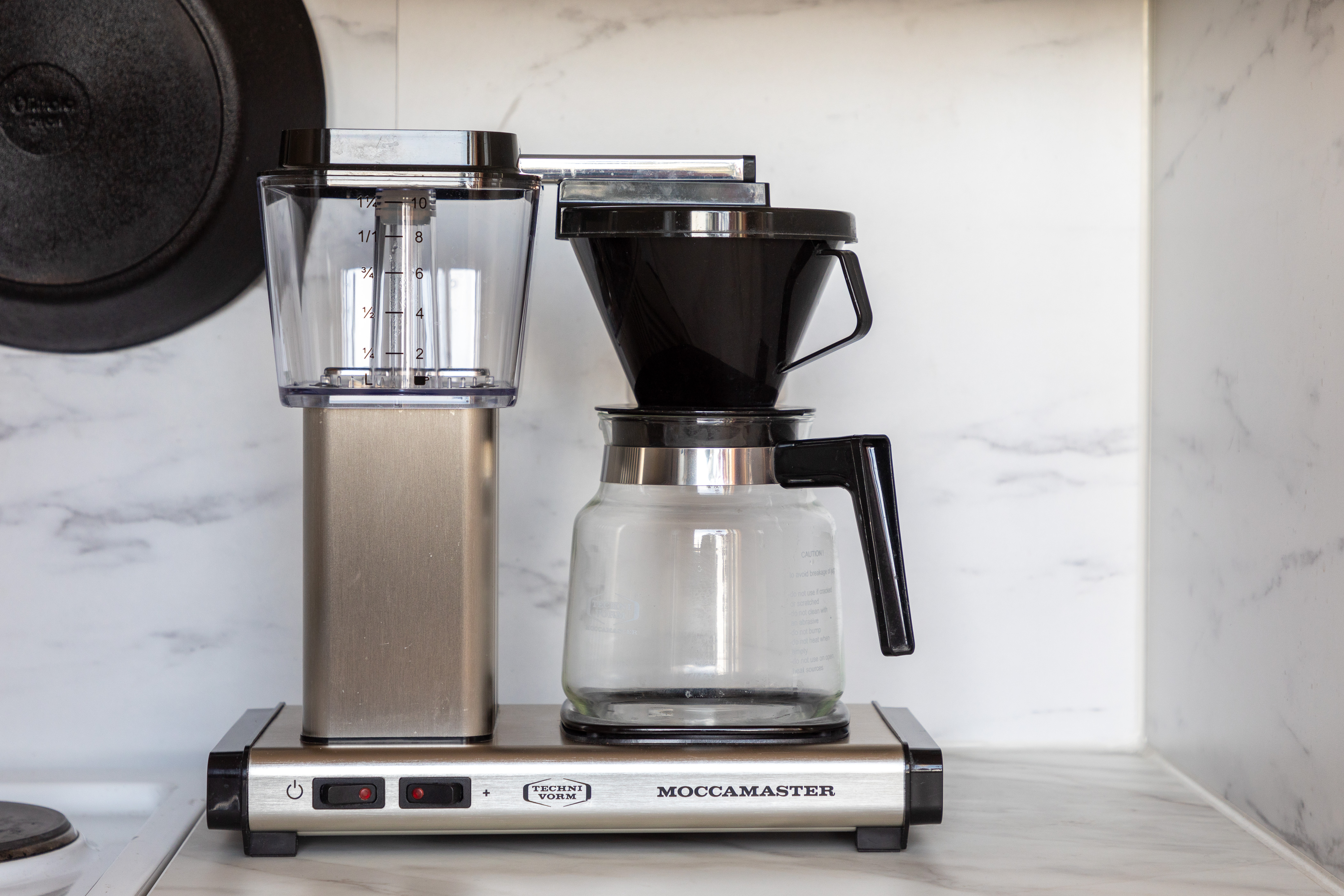
Moccamaster K741.64B

The Moccamaster KBG 741 AO has 137 parts. This includes a water reservoir that drips into a heater located in the base, and when the water reaches the boiling point of 100 degrees Celsius (212 degrees Fahrenheit), it bubbles up through a tube in the center of the reservoir. This delivers the hot water to a cone-shaped coffee grind holder, which drips into a carafe at 92 to 96 °C (198 to 205 °F), considered an optimal temperature range. In premium models while the coffee enters the carafe, it passes through a destratification tube. The tube delivers the liquid coffee to the bottom of the carafe, so that weaker coffee (what is dripped through the beans at the end) is distributed evenly with the stronger coffee (that is pumped through the coffee first).

The visual design of the Moccamaster is distinct and is sold through the store at the Museum of Modern Art's Design Store in New York City. In media, Good Morning America listed it as the number-one desired wedding gift among staff members polled. The Specialty Coffee Association includes several Moccamaster models in its Certified Home Brewer Program.

A Consumer Reports review determined that the coffee taste is high-quality, yet the process of brewing it is complex and does not justify its high-ticket price. Other reviews mention that the Moccamaster's plastic parts are not durable, while other reviews refer to the machine as "the holy grail of coffee makers."
