= Maurits Post =

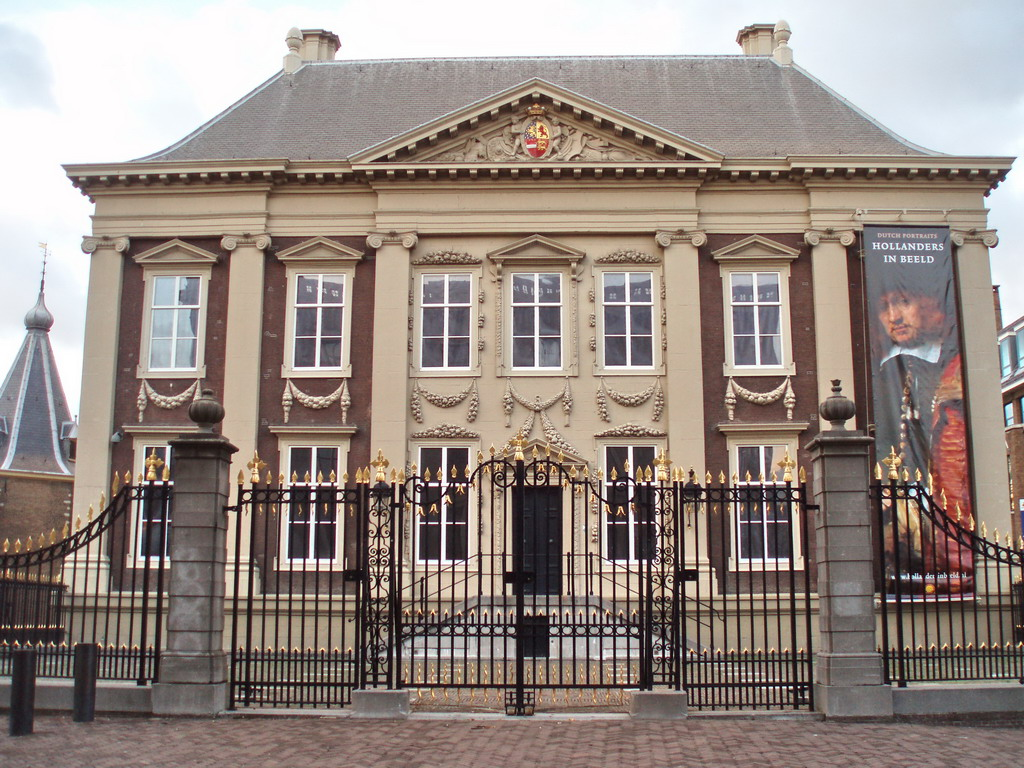
The Mauritshuis museum is named after its first owner, Prince Maurits, who hired Pieter Post to design his house. In 1668 Maurits (who was probably named after him) designed a garden for this house.

Maurits Post (ca. 10 December 1645 – 6 June 1677) was a Dutch Golden Age architect.

== Biography ==
Post was born in Haarlem, the son of the architect Pieter Post, and was probably his assistant, as he took over his father's projects when he died in 1669, and continued working in the neo-classical style. He worked in Siegen, The Hague, Dieren, Honselersdijk, Soestdijk, and Zuilenstein. He became the architect for Stadtholder William III of Orange from 1672 until his own early death at The Hague in 1677. Famous buildings include Castle Amerongen, the Prinzenhof palace in Kleve, and the royal palaces Soestdijk Palace, Huis ten Bosch Palace and Noordeinde Palace.
