= Amerongen =

Town in the province of Utrecht, Netherlands

- Town
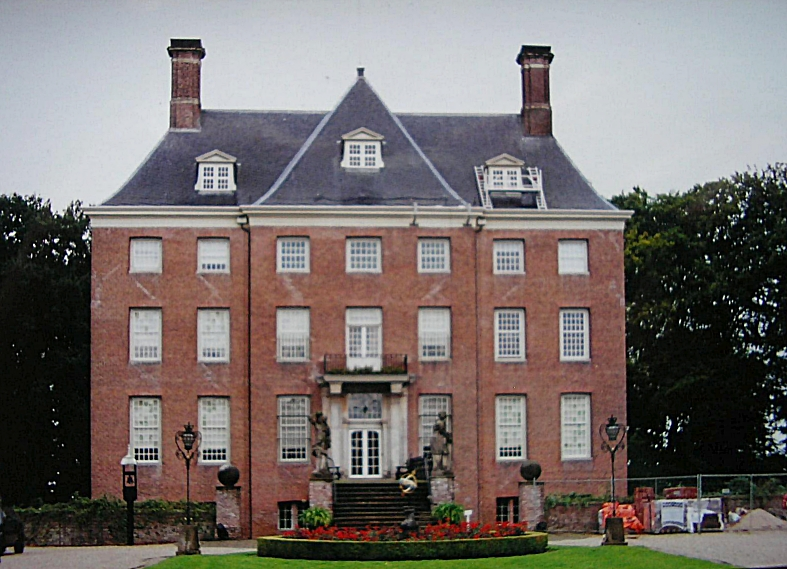
- Amerongen Castle

- Flag Coat of arms

- Location in the Netherlands Amerongen (Netherlands)
- Coordinates: 52°0′9″N 5°27′39″E
- Country: Netherlands
- Province: Utrecht
- Municipality: Utrechtse Heuvelrug

Area
  - Total: 29.68 km^{2} (11.46 sq mi)
- Elevation: 42 m (138 ft)

Population (2021)
  - Total: 6,985
  - Density: 235.3/km^{2} (609.5/sq mi)
- Time zone: UTC+1 (CET)
  - Summer (DST): UTC+2 (CEST)
- Postal code: 3958
- Dialing code: 0343

Amerongen (Dutch pronunciation: [ˈaːmərɔŋə(n)]) is a town in the municipality of Utrechtse Heuvelrug in the province of Utrecht, Netherlands, on the border of the Utrecht Hill Ridge. It lies about 7 km (4.3 mi) southwest of Veenendaal (10.5 km or 6.5 mi by road).

The landscape rises from the flat water meadows of the Nederrijn (Lower Rhine) to the Utrecht Hill Ridge ("Utrechtse Heuvelrug"). The highest point in the western Netherlands is located 2 km east of the village. The Amerongense Berg (Amerongen Mountain) has a height of 69 metres above sea level.

== History ==
The history of Amerongen is closely related to that of Amerongen Castle. This castle was first established in 1286 as a wooden donjon but was rebuilt in stone. It was damaged or destroyed by fire and rebuilt several times during the following centuries. In 1672 the Netherlands were invaded by the French army and in early 1673, the castle was deliberately burned down as a punishment for non-payment of taxes levied by the French. Shortly afterwards the castle was rebuilt, under the capable supervision of Margaretha Turnor, wife of Van Reede, owner of the castle and special envoy to the court of Brandenburg at this time. The newly built and extended castle arose in the Dutch Classicist style. Although the grounds and gardens were remodelled at various times and the interior brought up to date by Pierre Cuypers in the early 20th century, it remains a prime example of this style.

The former Emperor of Germany, Wilhelm II, sought refuge in the Netherlands in November 1918 after the First World War. He lived in the castle until May 1920, when he moved to nearby Doorn, where he spent the rest of his life. It was in the Castle of Amerongen that he signed the Act of Abdication.

Until January 1, 2006, Amerongen was a separate municipality, which covered the village of Amerongen itself, Overberg, and the western part of the village of Elst. Elst was transferred to the municipality of Rhenen; the largest part of the municipality has merged with four other municipalities to form the new municipality of Utrechtse Heuvelrug.

In 2021, the village of Amerongen had 6.985 inhabitants. In 2001, the built-up area of the village was 1.21 km^{2}, and contained 2072 residences.

"Amerongen", "Van Amerongen" and "Van Nieuw Amerongen" are surnames that indicate that their ancestors originated from this area.

== Economics ==
Amerongen had a tobacco industry until the 19th century. The downfall of the tobacco industry was caused by the rise of cigar consumption, to which the tobacco from Amerongen was not suited. The foreign tobacco market also contributed to the downfall of the local tobacco industry. In 1879 the local Earl of Amerongen, Aldenburgh Bentinck, tried to revive the local economy by opening a cream factory in 1890. However, the factory had to close in 1912 and he then insisted the village on growing tulips. However, the domestic Dutch market proved too strong for the village and the production was stopped. In a last effort the Earl insisted on building hop-yards to grow hops, however this plan failed too. The majority of the villagers therefore became dependent on jobs in neighboring villages.

The factory of Technivorm, the producer of the Moccamaster coffee machine, is situated in Amerongen.

=== Transportation ===
The village of Amerongen is served by one bus line, namely line 50 to Utrecht and back to Veenendaal and Wageningen. The village was served by a tram from 9 November 1884 until 1949, which went from Zeist to Arnhem. The tram itself was electrified in 1922, before it was electrified the tramline was used by steamtrams. The increase of the amount of autobusses contributed to the downfall of the tram in Amerongen, on which operations with the tram ceased in 1949. There are no tram tracks left in the village.

== Gallery ==
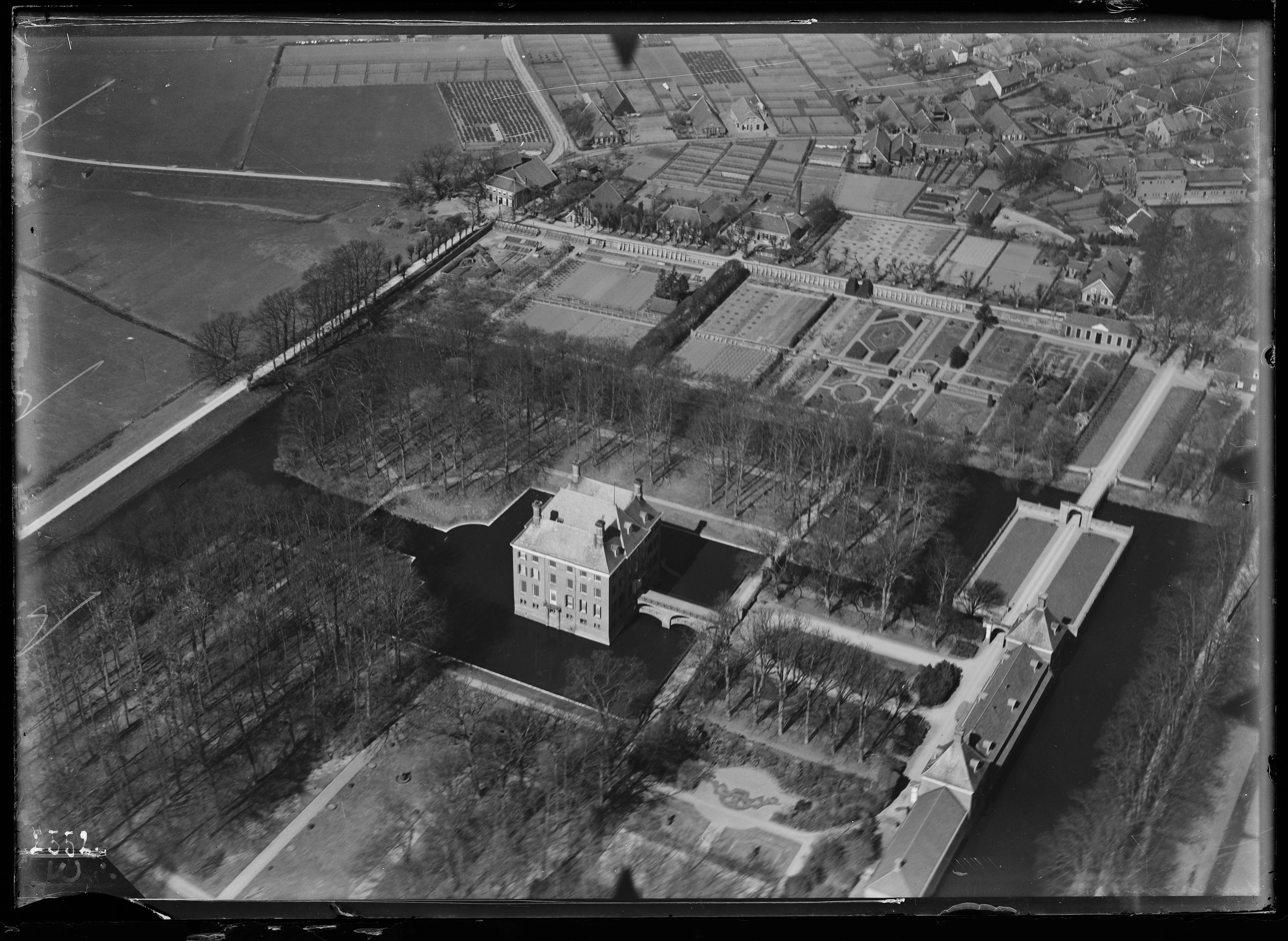
Kasteel Amerongen, +/-1920-1940

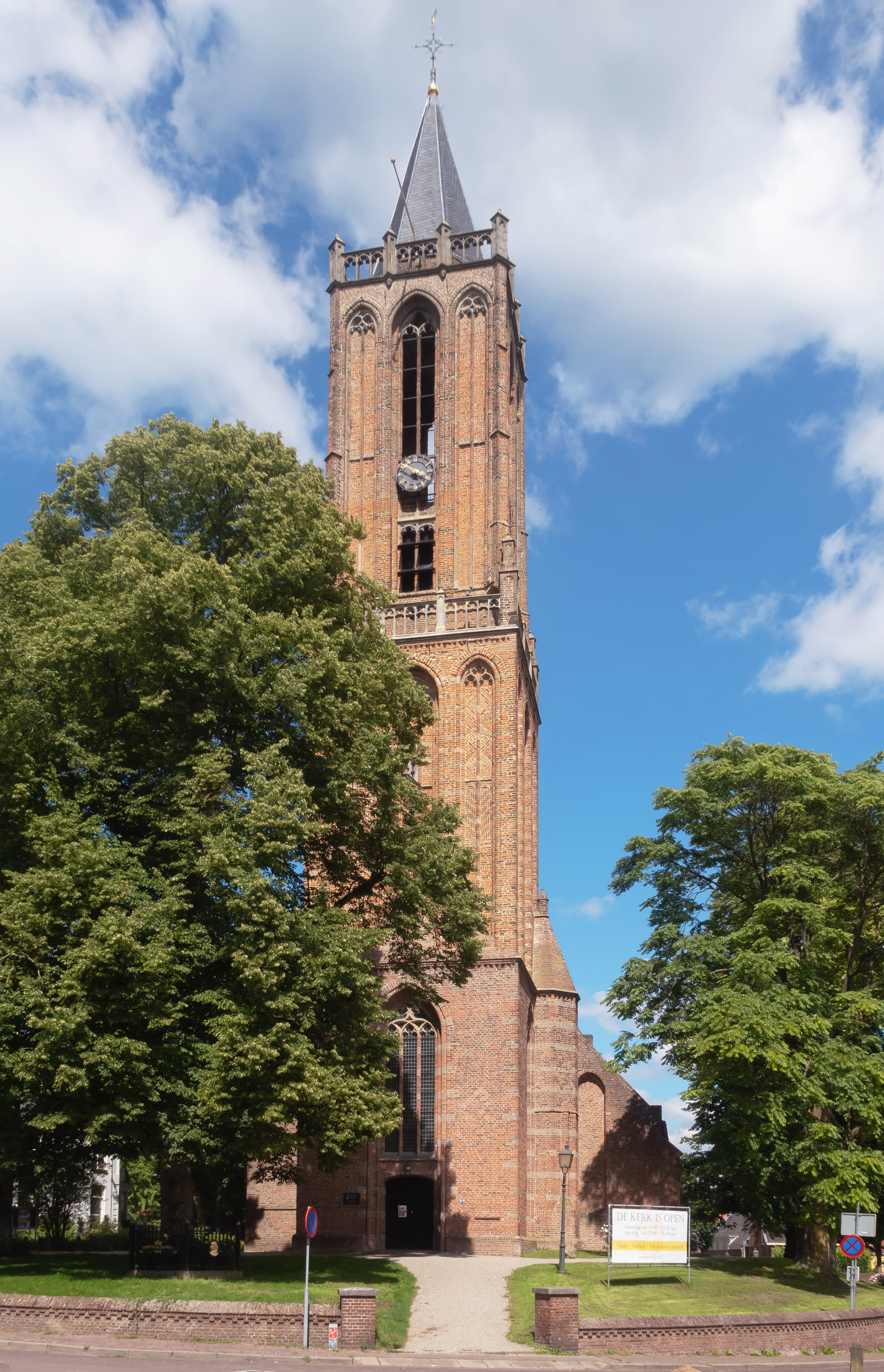
The Andrieskerk.

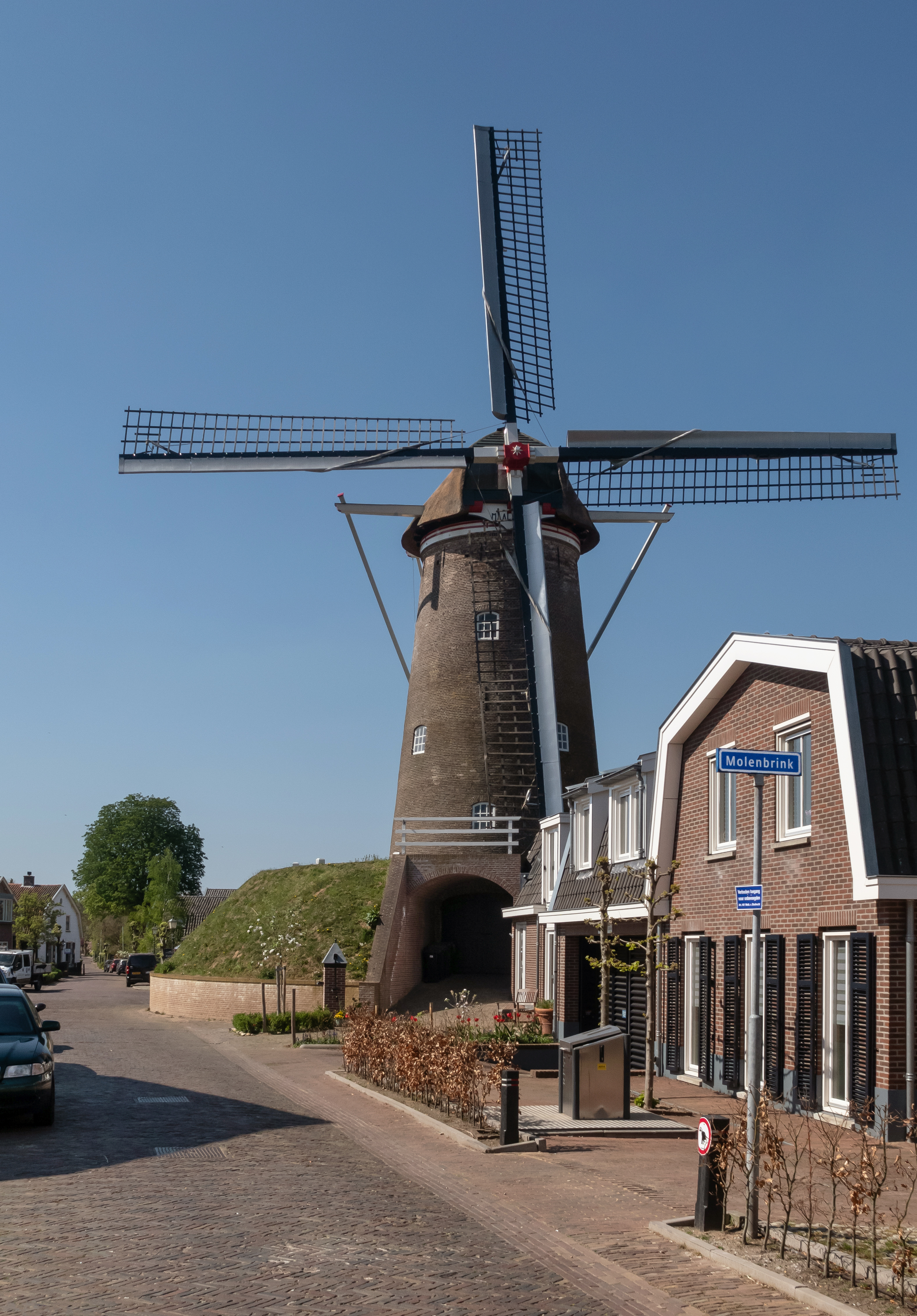
Amerongen, windmill: molen Maallust

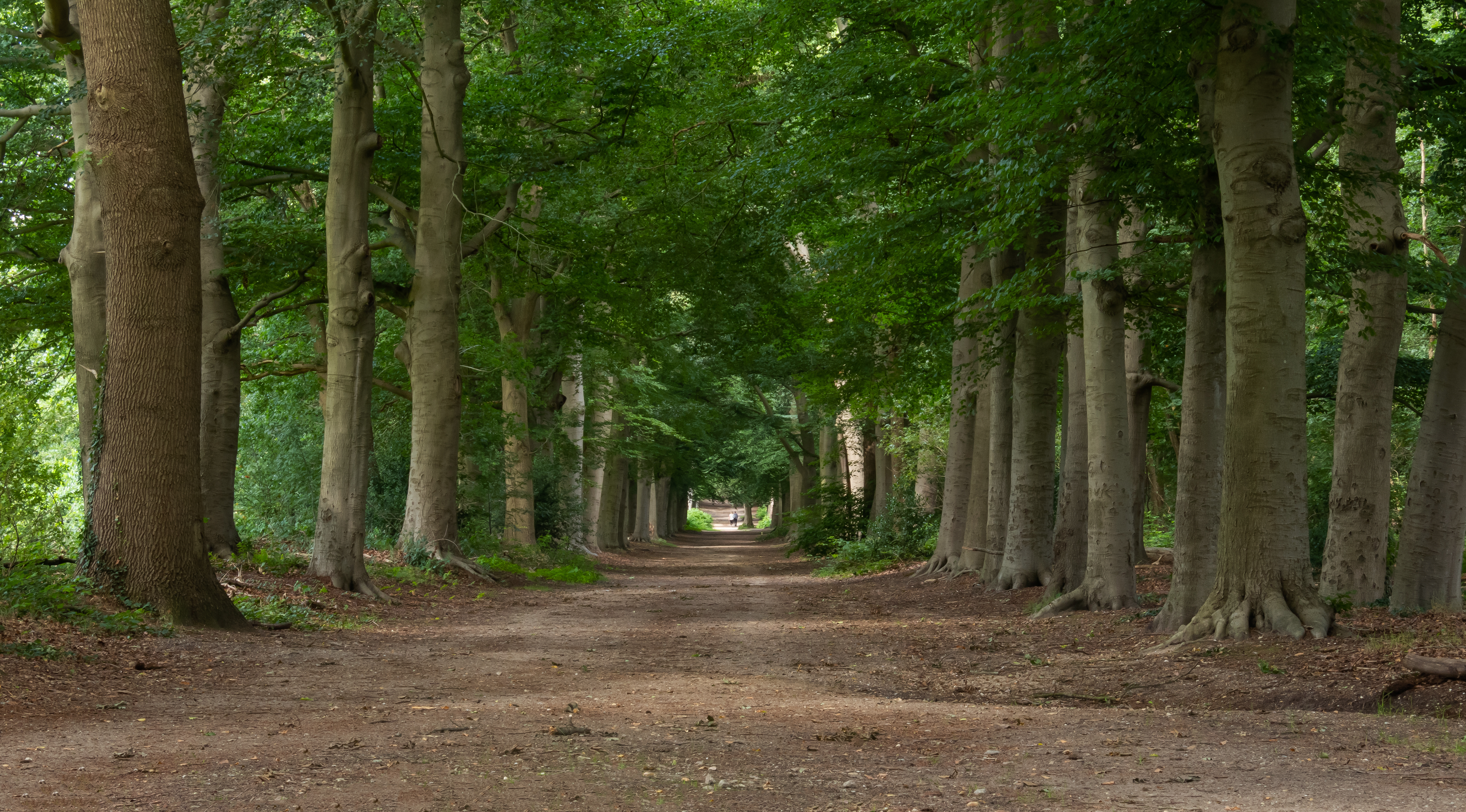
Wood: Amerongse bos
