= Amerongen Castle =

Coordinates: 51°59′43″N 5°27′30″E

- Kasteel Amerongen
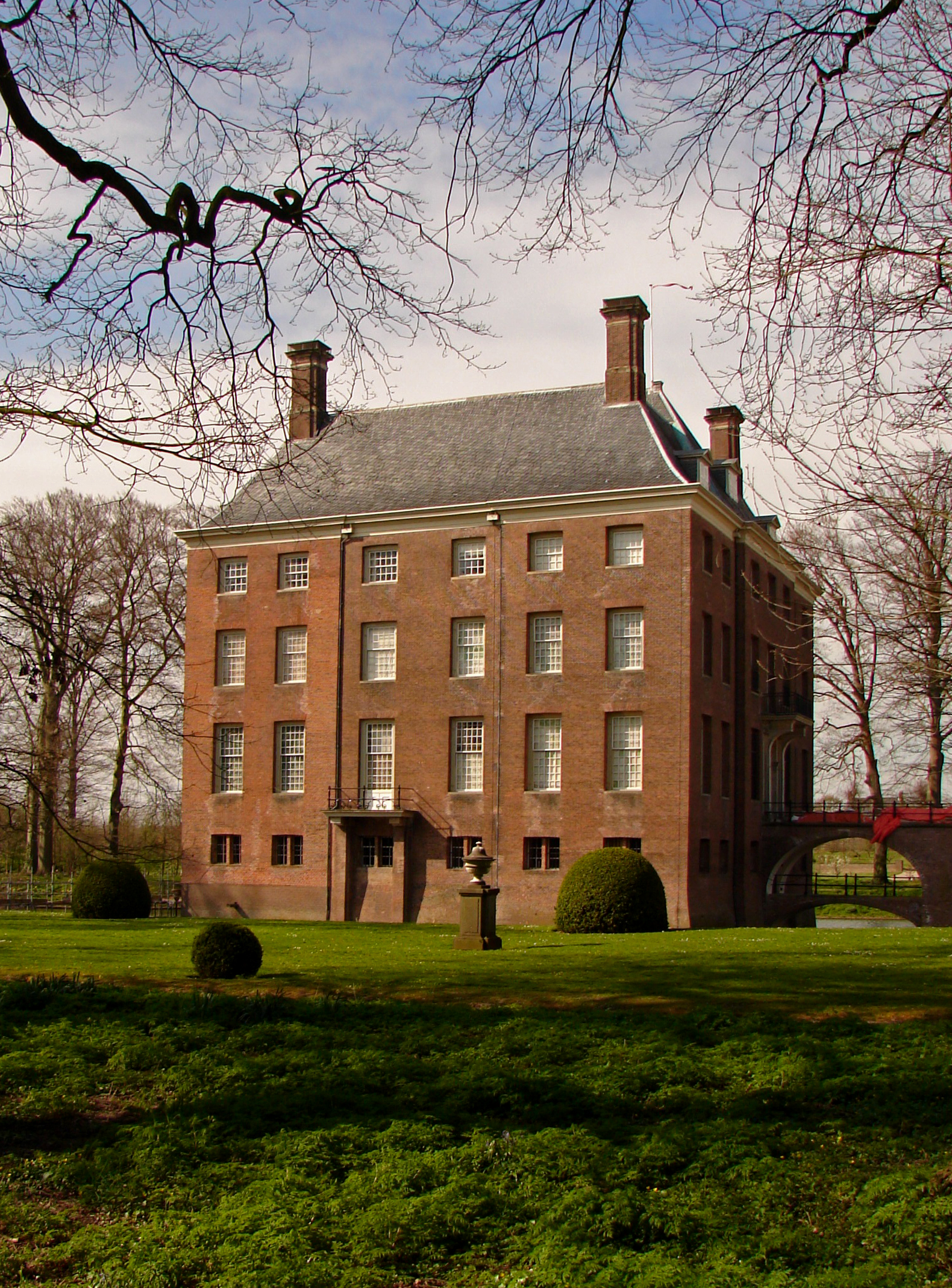
- Built for Godard Adriaan van Reede (1621–1691)
- Interactive map of the Amerongen Castle area

General information
- Type: Castle
- Architectural style: neo-classical
- Location: Amerongen, the Netherlands, Drostestraat 20
- Completed: 1678
- Owner: Stichting Kasteel Amerongen

Design and construction
- Architect: Maurits Post

Amerongen Castle (Dutch: Kasteel Amerongen) was built between 1674 and 1680, on the site of a medieval castle that had been burned down by the French in 1673. The gardens still contain historic elements such as a conservatory dating from the 1890s. In 1918, the former German Kaiser Wilhelm II signed his abdication here and stayed till 1920, when he moved to Huis Doorn.

== History ==
The current building was designed by the architect Maurits Post as a baroque palace for the owners Godard Adriaan van Reede and his wife Margaretha Turnor. In the main hall a central staircase with painted ceiling was built by Willem van Nimwegen. Other ornaments were added in the early 20th century by P.J.H. Cuypers. The gardens contain historical elements and the walls predate 1673. Near the entrance bridge dating from 1678 is a wooden clock tower from 1728 that contains the original clock of the same date. In the north-east corner of the gardens is an orangerie dating from the 1880s, and the north wall was raised during the period when Wilhelm II was residing there 1918-1920. He abdicated in Amerongen then moved to Huis Doorn.

== Video installation ==
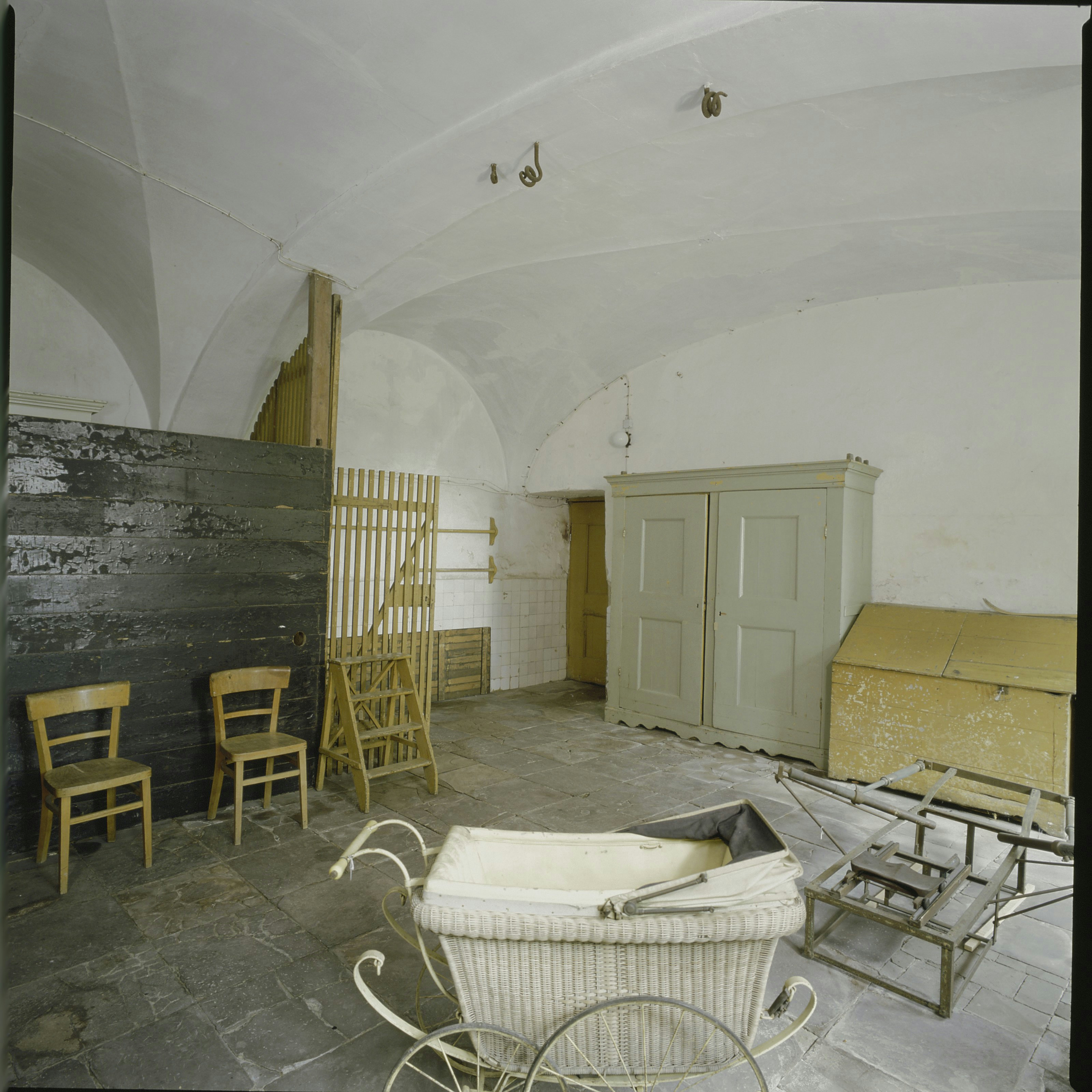
Interior view of the laundry room in the basement, before preservation.

From 2002-2011 the castle was restored as a partnership between the Rijksdienst voor het Cultureel Erfgoed and various funds in the cultural heritage sector. To celebrate the completion of the restoration activities, from July 1, 2011 till June 21, 2012, a video installation by Saskia Boddeke and Peter Greenaway was presented to visitors at the castle. Through sophisticated video projections visitors are taken back in time to 21 June 1680. In 37 minutes the story is told on 21 different screens throughout the castle. The castle functions today as a museum and is open from 11 to 5 PM from Thursday to Sunday.

=== Cast ===
- Margaretha Turnor — Anneke Blok
- Godard Adriaan van Reede — Gijs Scholten van Aschat
- Godard van Ginckel — Francis Broekhuijsen
- Sanne van Wierix — Maartje Teussink
- Gideon Momper — Fabian Jansen
- Oulder Bogarde — Hendrik Aerts
- Nelleke Trappen — Kitty Courbois
- Cor Brakel — Tim Assen
- Sophie Visbach — Sylvia Poorta
- Stefana Tromper — Chris Nietvelt
- Sara Boon — Lotje van Lunteren
- Hendrickje Boon — Zoë Sterre Greenaway
- Bart Boon — Piet Veenstra
- Ans Heiden — Sytske van der Ster
- Greet Heiden — Femke van der Ster
- Clara Bosch — Lotte Schmidt
- Lise de Vries — Sofieke de Kater
- Sakky Saskia Boskie — Sarah Jonker
- Johan Leiderdorp — Hendrik Aerts
- Thomas Vrax — Kes Blans
- Frederick Volkers — Derk Stenvers
- Thomas Cotinis — Hubert Fermin
- Evelien Cotinis — Lotte Schmidt
- Hans Blok — Iwan Walhain
- Femke Blok — Rikke Rasmussen Mechlenborg
- Gillis Codde — Jan Rot
- Marie Tilburg — Elisa Somsen
- Lydia Smulders — Rikke Rasmussen Mechlenborg
- Gesina Pardel — Lotte Schmidt
- Ruud Molester — Iwan Walhain
- Jos Houlderkircher — Sjaak Hartog
- Clementina van der Loo — Renee van Beek
- Ensign Gerard van Broeder — Lodewijk Gerretsen
- Douwe van Driel — Oscar Wagenmans
- Crispijn van der Visscher — Hendrik Aerts
- Carol de Graff — Frans de Wit
- Abraham Issacs — Laus Steenbeeke
- Zacharias van Uylenburg — Laus Steenbeeke
- Godfried Trip — Jochum ten Haaf
- Aleida (van) Wouters — Eva Damen
- Commodius Hermstede — Adrian Brine
- Osip Barouschka — Roger Smeets
- Jean-Baptiste Becampen — Gerard Lemaître
- Ekke Knolle — David de Vriend
- Herman Geelvinck — Jon Marrée

== Aerial view ==
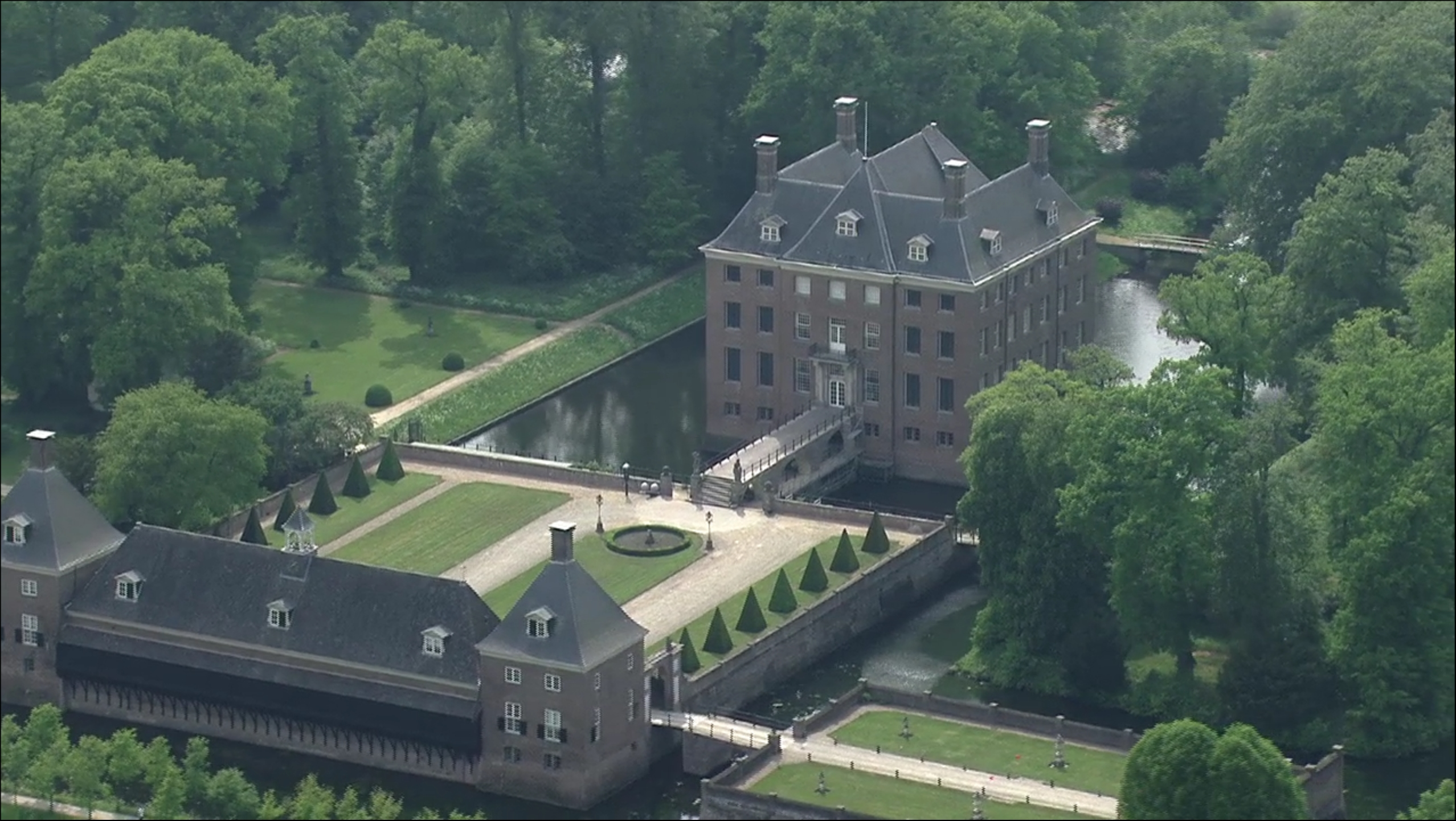
Amerongen Castle seen from the air (film still from video by Rijkswaterstaat)

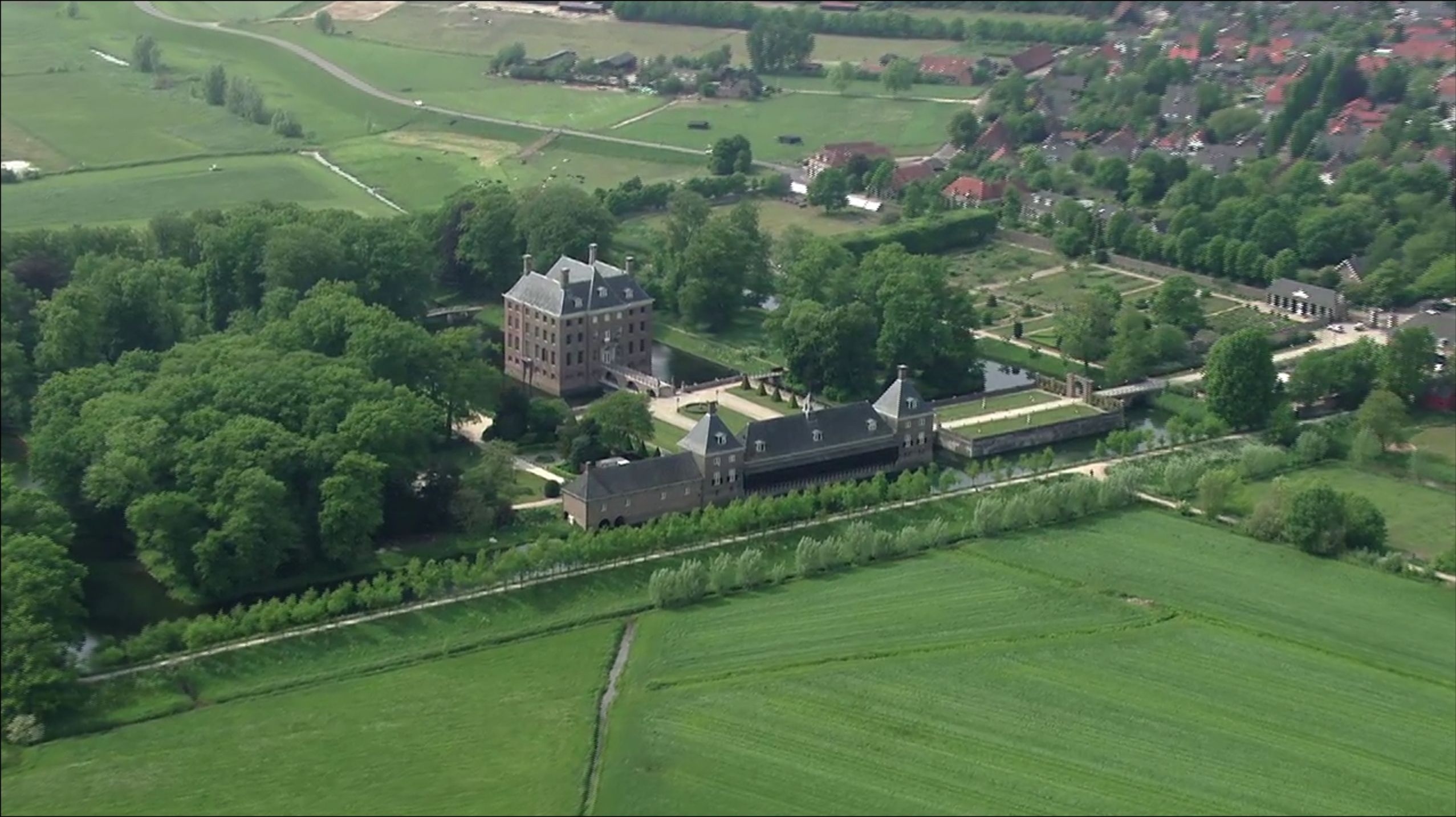
Amerongen Castle and its surroundings (film still from video by Rijkswaterstaat)
