= Operation Identify Me =

Interpol investigation launched in 2023

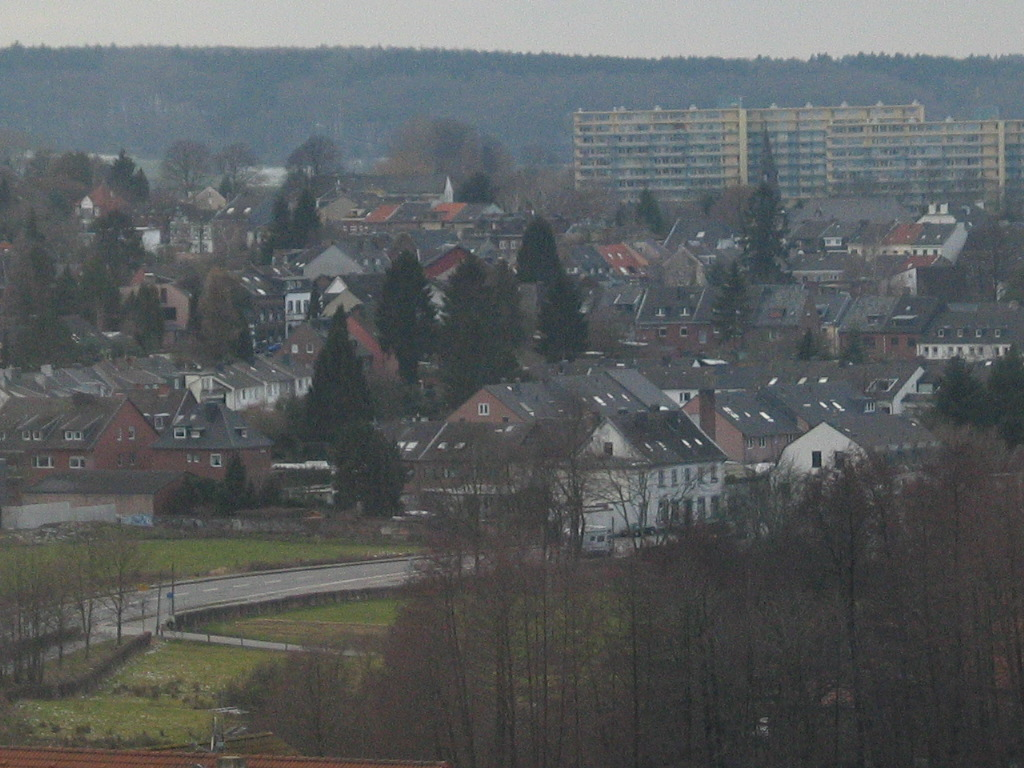
The border area of Germany, Belgium and the Netherlands.

Operation Identify Me was launched on 10 May 2023 by Interpol to solve cold cases across Western Europe to identify 22 unidentified women who were found deceased in the Netherlands, Belgium and Germany between 1976 and 2019. Most of the women were murdered, and six of them have been identified.

A public appeal was made for information surrounding the unidentified women. Interpol alongside Dutch, German, and Belgian police forces released forensic facial reconstructions as well as other information used in the investigations. It is believed some of the murdered women may be from parts of Eastern Europe.

The second phase of the project was launched in October 2024. The 46 newly publicised cases were expanded to France, Italy and Spain.

== Cases (2023) ==
The suspected murder cases in the first phase span five decades. The bodies were discovered between October 1976 and August 2019. Their average ages range from 15 to 30. Most of the women suffered violent deaths.

#	Case code	Case name	Date of discovery	Country	Location	Estimated age	Progress	Details
1	NL01	"Heul Girl"/ "The girl on the parking lot"	24 October 1976	Netherlands	A12 motorway near Maarsbergen	13 to 20	Unidentified	Hikers were near the former parking De Heul on the A12, in Maarsbergen, Netherlands, between Utrecht and Arnhem. Hidden under soil and branches, they found the body of a woman. It had been linked to a missing person case in the same area but in 2006 it was found to have been incorrect.
2	DE02	"The woman by the motorway"	16 March 1986	Germany	Near Heidelberg	27 to 33	Unidentified	A woman was found near the Weißer Stock parking area where the A6 motorway meets the A5.
3	DE05	"The woman in men’s clothing"	8 November 1988	Germany	Spandauer Forest	25 to 30	Unidentified	A group of seven forest workers found the body of a woman lying in a hole in the middle of a fenced and protected area. It is believed that the hole had been opened by foxes.
4	NL02	"Teteringen Girl"	25 December 1990	Netherlands	Teteringen, Breda	15 to 25	Unidentified	The body of an olive skinned woman was found in the woods in Teteringen, near Breda on Christmas Day 1990.
5	BEL01	"The woman in the well"	6 August 1991	Belgium	Attenhovendreef, Holsbeek	30 to 55	Unidentified	The body of a woman was found in a rainwater well in the grounds of a cottage. Her body might have been in the well for up to two years.
6	BEL02	"The woman with the flower tattoo"	3 June 1992	Belgium	Antwerp	31	Identified	The body of a woman was found lying against a grate in the river ‘Groot Schijn' in Antwerp. She had a tattoo of a black flower on her left arm. In November 2023 she was identified as Rita Roberts from the United Kingdom.
7	NL03	"The woman in the canal"	7 September 1992	Netherlands	Amsterdam	25 to 45	Unidentified	On 6 September 1992, in the centre of Amsterdam, a passer-by found two hands at Lauriergracht; when the canal was searched, two lower legs were found. Subsequently, a suitcase containing the torso of a female was found in the canal at Egelantiersgracht. Some days later, more body parts were found at Prinsengracht.
8	NL04	"Woman at the border"	6 July 1994	Netherlands	Retranchement, near the border with Belgium.	35 to 47	Unidentified	Body parts were found in a thicket at the edge of the parking lot of visitors’ centre.
9	NL05	"The woman with the bracelet"	13 January 1995	Netherlands	Uilenstede, Amstelveen	20 to 35	Unidentified	A passer-by saw a plastic package floating in the water and called the police. The package turned out to contain part of the body of a woman, wrapped in a sheet. Her head, lower legs and one arm were not found.
10	BEL03	"The woman in the dam"	9 May 1996	Belgium	Froidchapelle	25 to 35	Unidentified	The body of a woman was found in the lake near the La Plate Taille dam in Froidchapelle. The body may have been in the water for up to 1 or 2 years.
11	DE03	"The burned body in the forest"	2 June 1997	Germany	Altena	18 to 22	Unidentified	A nude female body was found in a wooded area in Altena-Bergfeld, North Rhine-Westphalia. The victim had been raped, strangled and then set on fire. Post-mortem exams showed that it is almost 100% certain that the crime was committed by a member of the victim's family.
12	DE06	"The woman with the flower skirt"	24 July 1997	Germany	Todtnau	Around 20	Unidentified	The partially burnt body of a woman was found in a pit near Weissenbach forest car park.
13	NL06	"The woman on the boat"	16 January 1998	Netherlands	Amsterdam	25 to 35	Unidentified	The body of a woman was found on a burnt out houseboat.
14	NL07	"The woman in the Gaasp river"	17 September 1999	Netherlands	Driemond	18 to 35	Unidentified	The body of a woman who was killed by gunshot was found in an industrial waste container floating in the Gaasp river and encased in concrete.
15	DE01	"The body in the bog"	14 October 2001	Germany	Worringen, Cologne	20 to 30	Unidentified	A mushroom picker found the dead body of a woman, thought to have been mixed race, in the Worringer Bruch bog area in the Worringen quarter of Cologne. The body had been there for at least four months, and four years at the latest.
16	BEL04	"The woman in the Scheldt"	20 April 2002	Belgium	Antwerp	20 to 40	Unidentified	A body was found in the River Scheldt in the Linkeroever area of Antwerp.
17	DE04	"The body in the carpet"	30 July 2002	Germany	Port at the Weser in Bremen	22 to 35	Unidentified	A bundle containing the body of a woman was found in the River Weser by a boat skipper.
18	NL08	"The woman in the IJ river"	17 May 2004	Netherlands	Amsterdam	16 to 35	Unidentified	The body was found in a suitcase in the IJ River.
19	BEL05	"The woman in the Meuse"	7 June 2005	Belgium	Jambes	25 to 40	Unidentified	A body was found in the River Meuse.
20	NL09	"The woman in the suitcase"	12 October 2005	Netherlands	Thorbeckesingel, Schiedam	16 to 22	Unidentified	The body was found in a suitcase in a canal at Thorbeckesingel. The suitcase had been there for some time.
21	BEL06	"The woman with the artificial nails"	31 May 2009	Belgium	Visé, near the Dutch border	14 to 24	Unidentified	The body of a young woman was found in the Albert Canal in Visé. It had been weighed down by weights.
22	BEL07	"The woman in the park"	29 August 2019	Belgium	Liège	35 to 45	Unidentified	The partially charred skeleton of a woman was found in vegetation near a pathway in Parc de Cointe on Boulevard Gustave Kleyer.

== Cases (2024) ==
#	Case code	Case name	Date of discovery	Country	Location	Estimated age	Progress	Details
23	FR07	"The girl with the 10-pence coin"	25 November 1982	France	Departmental road D723 in Le Cellier	16 to 23	Unidentified	The victim's skeletonized remains were found in a wasteland by a hunter. It is believed that she died sometime between June and September 1982, and that she might be from the United Kingdom or at least visited this country due to the presence of a 10-pence coin near her body.
24	DE09	"The woman with the paisley jeans"	8 February 1989	Germany	An abandoned quarry near Lahn-Dill-Kreis	22 to 32	Unidentified	The woman's body, found covered with rubbish, was approximately there for two weeks to two months, with investigators believing that she died via asphyxiation after becoming intoxicated. She might originate from Thailand, and likely gave birth at least once during her lifetime.
25	FR03	"The woman with the special teeth"	29 January 1994	France	Bois d'Alix, in Lassy, Val-d'Oise	approx. 25	Unidentified	The woman's skull was found by a hunter, with additional remains buried in the area being located by gendarmeries.
26	DE07	"The woman with the “Little Italy” T-shirt"	20 August 1994	Germany	Military training area near Hanover	30 to 55	Unidentified	The skeletal remains of the victim were found in a trench near the military training area. It is estimated that she died two to five years prior, but the exact cause of death could not be determined.
27	ES03	"The woman who wasn’t alone"	27 January 1999	Spain	Hotel room in Premià de Mar	23 to 25	Unidentified	The victim was found with her hands tied and bearing signs of violence. She was last seen in the company of an unidentified young white male who spoke French and English, with the pair possibly coming from Geneva, Switzerland or a nearby town with "ville" in its name.
28	IT03	"The woman in the cardboard box"	14 June 2001	Italy	Via de Freigoso, Genoa	30 to 40	Unidentified	The woman, a possible drug mule from South America, died after a capsule containing crack cocaine ruptured inside her body.
29	FR05	"The pregnant woman with the garnet necklaces"	3 July 2001	France	Mimeure	approx. 35	Unidentified	The woman's body, wrapped in a bag made out of a pair of curtains with a paisley pattern, was found in a forest by a walker. At the time of her death, she was seven to nine months pregnant.
30	DE08	"Girl from the Main"/ "The girl in the River Main"	31 July 2001	Germany	River Main in Frankfurt	16	Identified	The girl, possibly originating from an area along the Durand Line, was found wrapped up in a bundle. It is believed that she was severely mistreated and possibly sexually abused in life, leading to her eventual death. She was identified as "Diana S." in May 2026 and her father was arrested on suspicion of murder.
31	ES04	"The woman on the road"	3 November 2003	Spain	Malgrat de Mar	25 to 30	Unidentified	The woman was found dead on a rural road with multiple stabbing injuries to the face. It was initially believed it might be linked to a similar case in the Netherlands in 2016, but this was ruled out.
32	IT02	"The woman with the watch"	23 January 2004	Italy	Wooded area in Asso	Unknown	Unidentified	The woman's body was found in a wooded area.
33	NL10	"The woman with the German keys"	4 July 2004	Netherlands	Meijendel dune near Wassenaar	35	Identified	The woman's body was found on a beach at the time of UEFA Euro 2004, with no conclusive explanation to her death. Investigators believe that while she resided in Germany for the latter part of her life, the woman was born somewhere in Eastern Europe. In October 2025, she was identified as 35-year-old German citizen Eva Maria Pommer.
34	FR02	"The woman with the Richmond dental crown"	7 January 2005	France	Secondary road in the village of Saint-Quirin	35 to 47	Identified	The woman's mutilated body was found in a barrel-shaped rainwater butt wrapped in black rubbish bags, which had been tied up with cords. It is believed that the same rainwater butt was seen floating in the Red Saar River in mid-October 2004. In March 2026, she was identified as an Algerian-born woman named Hakima Boukerouis, and her husband was arrested for her murder. However, he was released due to health reasons.
35	ES06	"The woman in pink"	2 July 2005	Spain	Viladecans	20 to 25	Identified	The woman's body was found alongside a road with her estimated time of death being a day prior. Investigators consider her death to be suspicious. She was identified in September 2025 as Liudmila Zavada from Russia by Turkish authorities via fingerprint analysis.
36	ES02	"The woman with the owl ring"	26 March 2007	Spain	M-127 road in El Berrueco	25 to 40	Unidentified	The woman's body was found covered with a sheet, but with no apparent signs of violence. Due to the presence of multiple latex capsules inside her body, it is believed that she might have been a drug mule.
37	IT04	"The globetrotter"	13 November 2007	Italy	Via di Cavigliano, Prato	50 to 60	Unidentified	The woman's body was found hanging from a tree in a park. A search of her bag led to the discovery of numerous items and souvenirs taken from across Europe and North America, suggesting that she travelled frequently.
38	FR04	"The woman with the “Jean & Nelly” ring"	5 March 2008	France	Villefranche-sur-Mer	60 to 75	Unidentified	The woman was found below a difficult to access coastal road, and she had died from some sort of trauma, possibly homicidal in nature. Due to a hip replacement, it is believed that she was a foreign visitor.
39	IT01	"The woman with the panther and scorpion tattoos"	25 May 2008	Italy	Po River near Carbonara di Po	20 to 30	Unidentified	The woman's body was found wrapped up in three black nylon bags inside the river.
40	ES01	"The woman of Mount Artxanda"	6 February 2009	Spain	Mount Artxanda, near Bilbao	30 to 40	Unidentified	The body was found near a forest trail with estimations that she died 24 to 72 hours prior. Her death is believed to be the result of intoxication.
41	BE09	"The woman with the cane"	28 July 2010	Belgium	River Meuse, near Liège	60 to 80	Unidentified	The woman's body was discovered floating in the river, with her most notable possession being a brown wooden cane with a rubber tip. Isotopic analysis suggests that she lived somewhere outside of the Benelux region in her early years.
42	NL11	"The woman with the Belgian connection"	6 January 2013	Netherlands	Banks of the Pietersplas Lake, on the Dutch-Belgian border	20 to 65	Unidentified	The woman's body was found washed up on an overgrown bank, with a high possibility that she originated from Belgium due to a blood sample resulting in a DNA match but not an identification. She was found completely nude, rendering her death suspicious.
43	FR06	"The woman with the butterfly tattoos"	17 April 2016	France	Seine River, near Athis-Mons	approx. 30	Unidentified	The woman's body was found floating in the river by a family going out on a walk, with the suspected cause of death being drowning. Due to the presence of 100 Venezuelan bolívars in her pocket, it is believed that she might be from Venezuela or possibly visited that country.
44	ES05	"The woman in the shed"	4 August 2018	Spain	Girona	33	Identified	The woman's body was found hanging in a poultry shed attached to a farmhouse. Despite three other people living there, none knew who she was, as she had no identity papers on her. In March 2025, she was identified as 33-year-old Ainoha Izaga Ibieta Lima, a Paraguayan national who moved to Spain in 2013.
45	ES07	"The introvert"	9 July 2019	Spain	Santa Eulària des Riu	25 to 30	Unidentified	The woman, clad only in a two-piece swimsuit, was found drowned by the occupants of a boat anchored off the coast of Santa Eulària des Riu. It is believed that she was a sex worker, possibly Romanian of Hungarian ethnicity, and was known to rarely interact with others.
46	FR01	"The young woman found in Saint-Denis"	23 June 2021	France	Saint-Denis, Seine-Saint-Denis	17 to 25	Unidentified	A skull and bones from a left leg were found inside a rubbish bag left in a wasteland. She is suspected to be African descent
47	BE08	"The woman in Ostend harbour"	6 August 2022	Belgium	Ostend Harbour	60 to 70	Unidentified	The woman's body was found floating in the harbour, having drowned up to a day prior. It is currently unclear how she ended up in the water.

== Further inquiries ==
On 16 May 2023, it was reported that police had received over 200 tip-offs regarding the cases, with 122 tips from Germany, 55 from Belgium and 51 from the Netherlands, some of them with names. Near the end of August, the number of tips had increased to over 500. By November police said they had received about 1,250 tips.

On August 29, 2023, Interpol made a public appeal on the identification of an unidentified dead boy in Großmehring, Bavaria, Germany. While the unknown dead child was not officially added in Operation Identify Me, he was part of an effort to publicly request tips for unidentified decedents.

== Identifications ==
In November 2023, "The woman with the flower tattoo" was named as British woman Rita Roberts. Roberts was 31 years old when she moved from Cardiff to Antwerp in February 1992 but was reported missing months later. Due to the publicization of the case, a member of her family in Britain recognised the tattoo and contacted the Belgian authorities to formally identify the body.

In mid-March 2025, a second phase case called "The woman in the shed" of 2018 was identified as Ainoha Izaga Ibieta Lima from Paraguay through fingerprints comparison. She was last contacted in 2018 and was reported missing by her brother months later.

In September 2025, "The woman in pink" was identified as Russian citizen Liudmila Zavada because of Turkish authorities' fingerprint analysis. She was so named for the pink top, pink trousers, and pink shoes she was wearing. She had been dead for less than 24 hours at the time of discovery, and her death was considered suspicious by Spanish police. Her body was discovered by the side of a road in Viladecans near Barcelona on 3 July 2005.

Barely a month after the previous identification, "The woman with German keys" was identified as German citizen, Eva Pommer after a vital tip about her. There was no mention if she was from Eastern Europe while being a German citizen.

In March 2026, "The woman with the Richmond dental crown" was identified as Hakima Boukerouis. French police made an arrest in connection to her death.

In May 2026, the identification of "The girl in the River Main" as "Diana S." was announced. On 12 May 2026, the victim's father, a 67-year-old German citizen originally from Pakistan, was arrested by the Hessian State Criminal Police Office on suspicion of her murder.

== See also ==
- Body identification
- Cold Case Files
- Disaster victim identification
- DNA Doe Project
- John Doe
- Operation Captura, another multi-country appeal for citizen crime assistance.
- Othram
- The Gentleman of Heligoland is a case looked at amongst many by Locate International.
- The Vanished (podcast)
- Unidentified decedent
- Vidocq Society
