= Hakenfelde =

- Quarter of Berlin
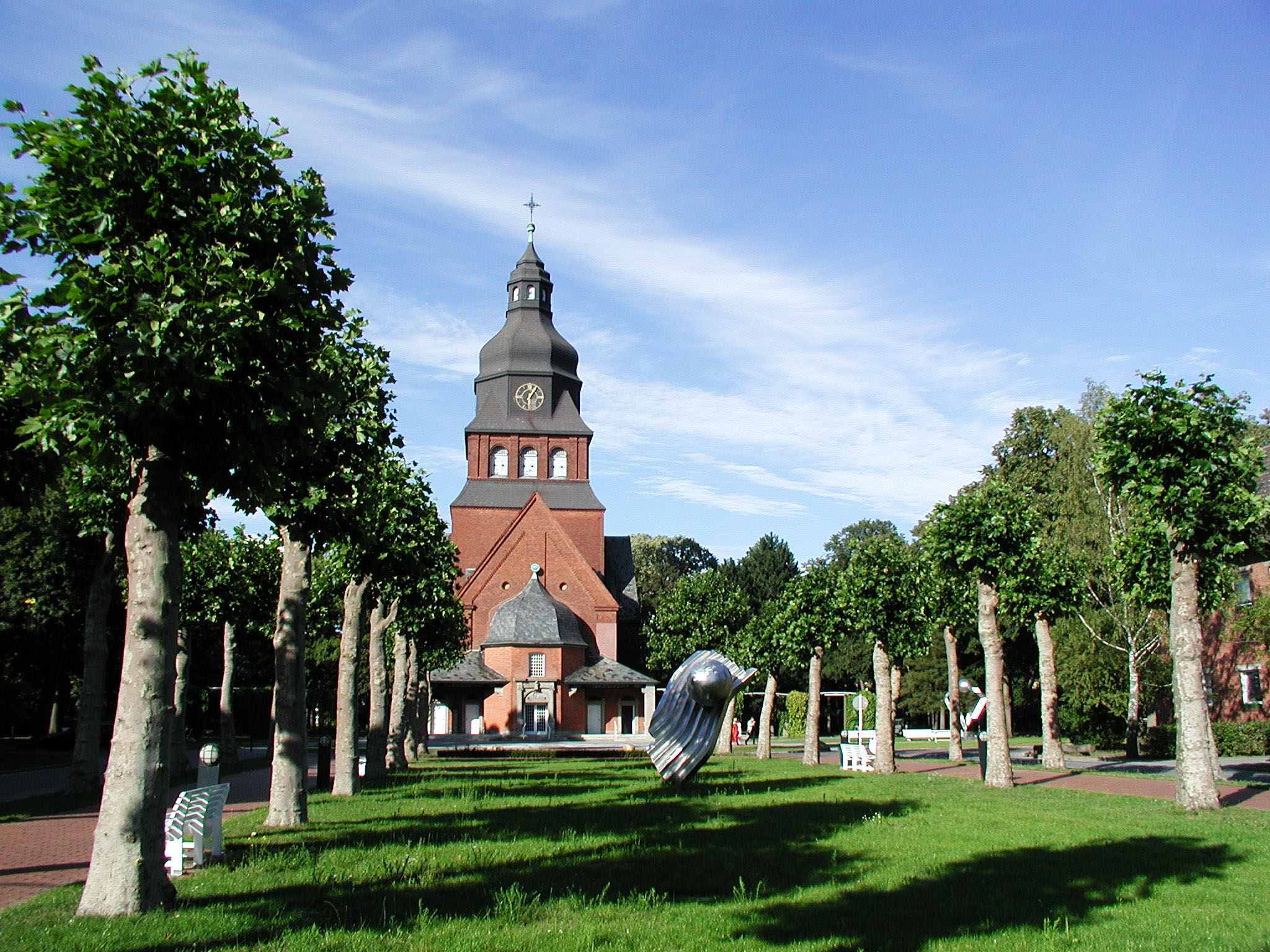
- The Evangelical church Stiftskirche-Johannesstift

- Location of Hakenfelde in Spandau district and Berlin
- Interactive map of Hakenfelde
- Location within Germany Location within Berlin
- Coordinates: 52°34′40″N 13°10′51″E
- Country: Germany
- State: Berlin
- City: Berlin
- Borough: Spandau
- Founded: 1730
- Subdivisions: 2 zones

Area
  - Total: 20.4 km^{2} (7.9 sq mi)
- Elevation: 40 m (130 ft)

Population (2024-12-31)
  - Total: 34,927
  - Density: 1,710/km^{2} (4,430/sq mi)
- Time zone: UTC+01:00 (CET)
  - Summer (DST): UTC+02:00 (CEST)
- Postal codes: 13587
- Vehicle registration: B

Hakenfelde (German pronunciation: [ˈhaːkn̩ˌfɛldə]) is a German locality (Ortsteil) of Berlin in the borough (Bezirk) of Spandau.

== History ==
The name Hakenfelde is derived a dairy-farm built in 1730 on the outskirts of Spandau. Part of the town of Spandau, it merged into Berlin in 1920 with the "Greater Berlin Act". Due to its position at the borders of West Berlin within East Germany it was largely crossed, from 1961 to 1989, by the Berlin Wall. In 2003 it became an autonomous Ortsteil, separated (with Falkenhagener Feld and Wilhelmstadt) from the one of Spandau.

== Geography ==
=== Overview ===
Located in the northeastern suburb of the city, Hakenfelde is surrounded by the Spandauer Forest and separated from the district of Reinickendorf by the river Havel. It borders with the Brandenburger municipalities of Falkensee, Schönwalde-Glien and Hennigsdorf, all in the district of Havelland. The bordering Ortsteil are Falkenhagener Feld, Haselhorst, Spandau, Reinickendorf and Konradshöhe (both in Reinickendorf district).

On the Havel there is an island (Eiswerder) and 3 islets (Pionierinsel, Großer Wall and Kleiner Wall) belonging to Hakenfelde. Eiswerder, situated in the middle of the Lake Spandau (Spandauer See), is linked to Hakenfelde and Haselhorst by 2 bridges.

=== Subdivision ===
The locality counts 2 zones (Ortslagen):

- Gartenstadt Waldsiedlung Hakenfelde
- Wasserstadt Spandau

== Photogallery ==
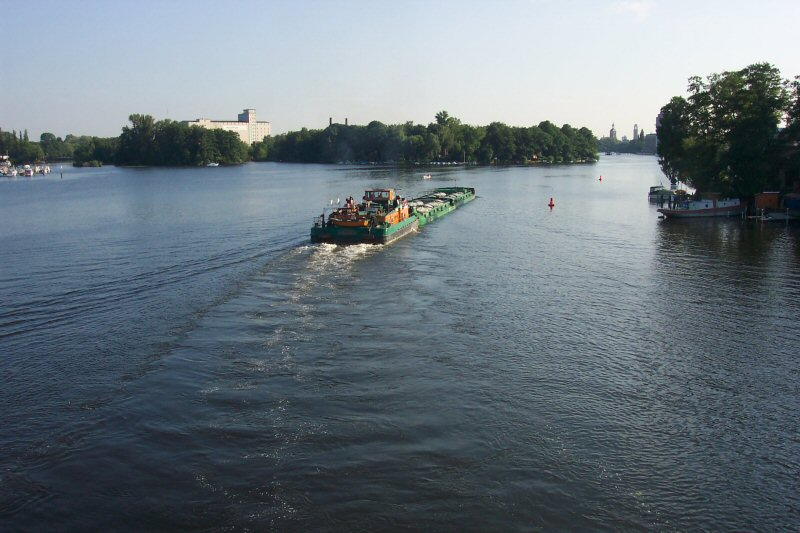
Eiswerder island

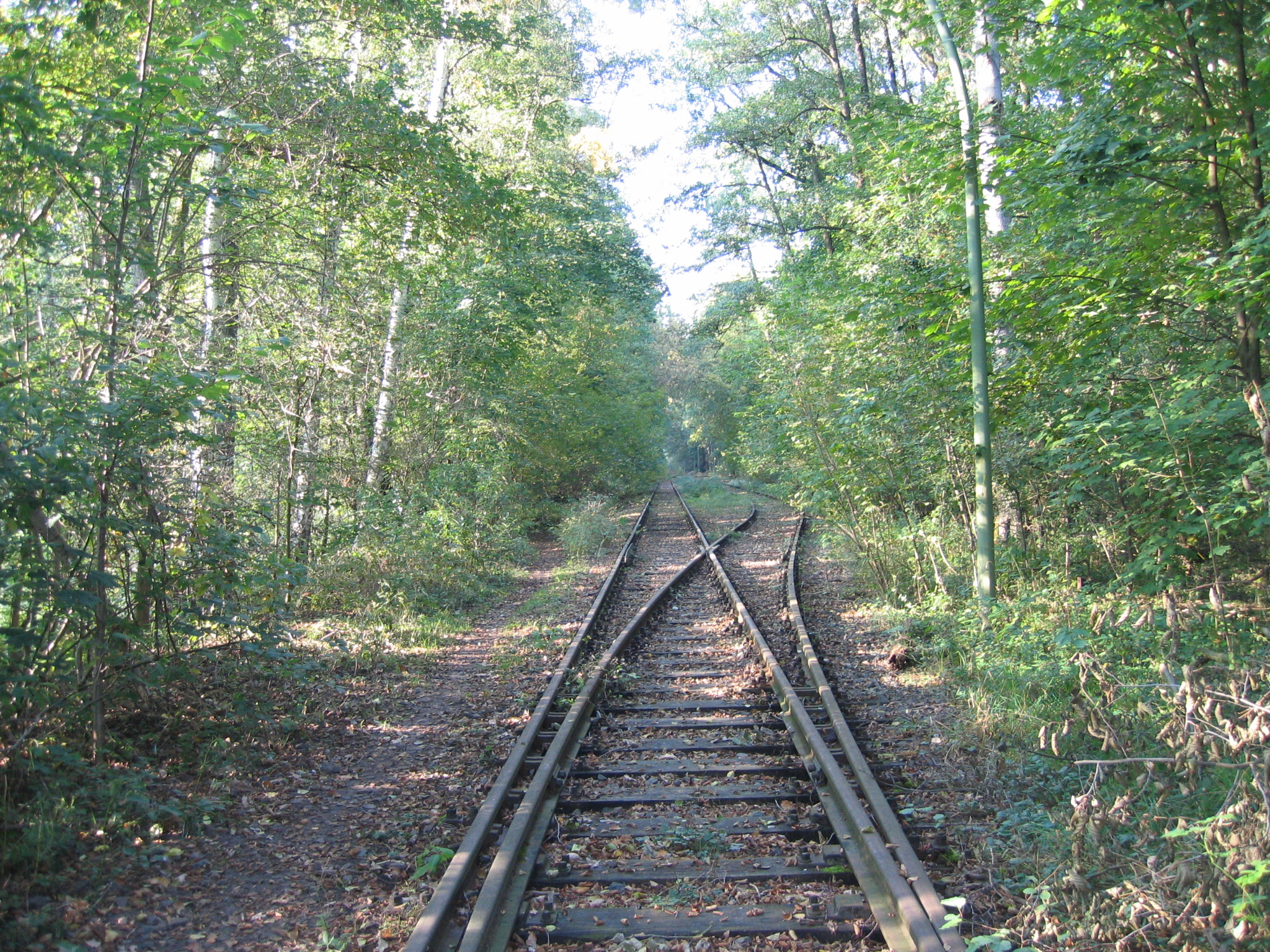
A disused rail track on the Spandauer Forest

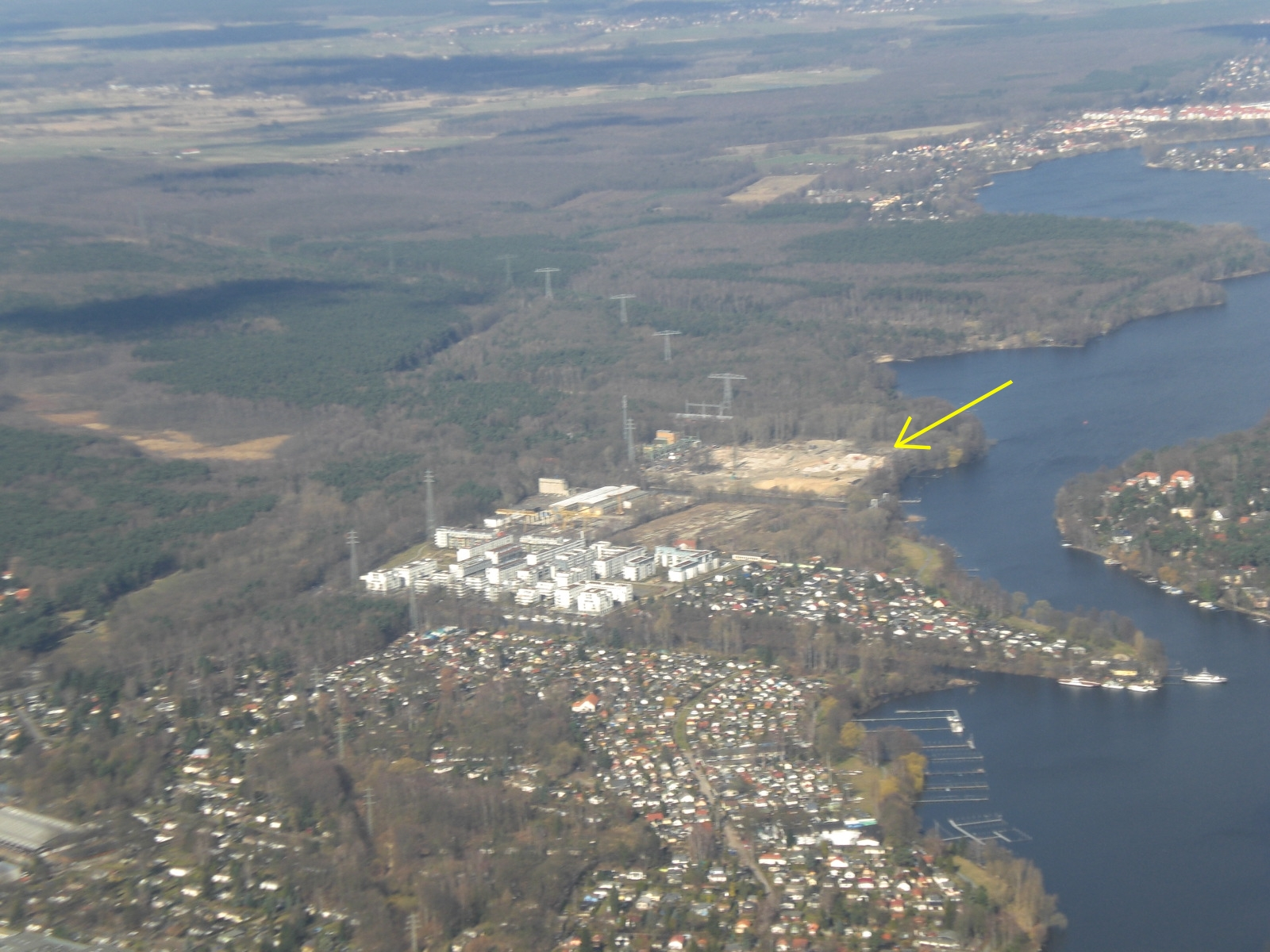
Aerial view of northern side of Hakenfelde

== Transport ==
Hakenfelde is not served by railways, it is simply traversed by the industrial track of the Osthavelländische Eisenbahn and the abandoned Bötzowbahn. It is served by several lines of the bus network and by some private ferry lines.
