= Geeren-Zuid =

- Neighbourhood
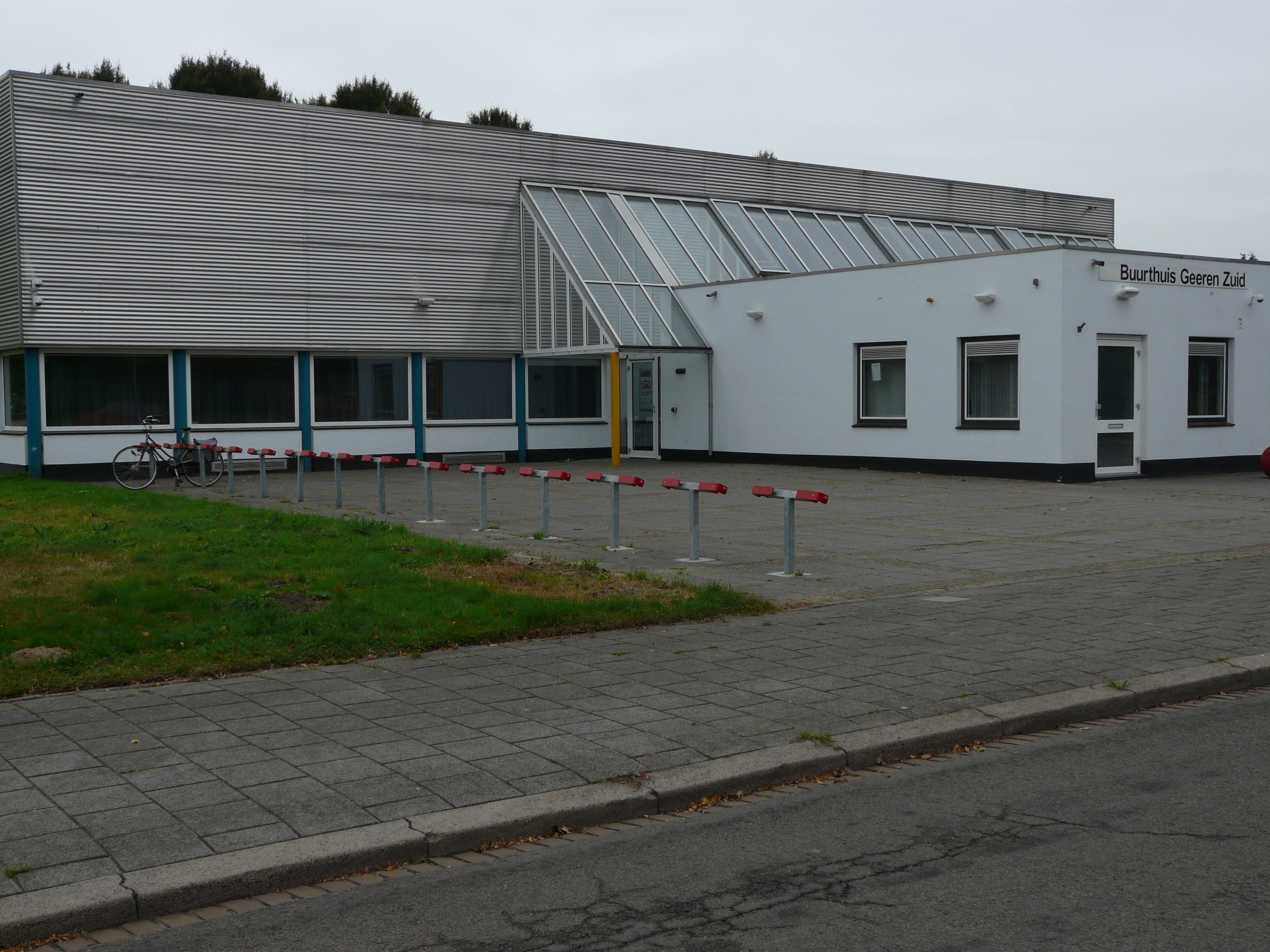
- Photo of former community center Geeren-Zuid

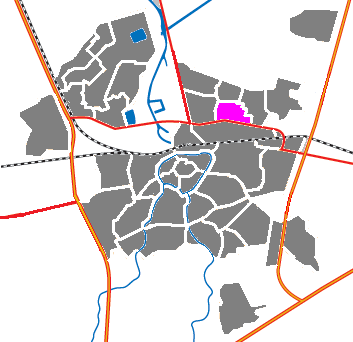
- Photo of Geeren-Zuid within Breda (Geeren-Zuid in pink)
- Country: Netherlands
- Province: North Brabant
- Municipality: Breda
- City: Breda

Area
  - Total: 0.75 km^{2} (0.29 sq mi)
  - Land: 0.73 km^{2} (0.28 sq mi)
  - Water: 0.02 km^{2} (0.0077 sq mi)

Population (2025)
  - Total: 3,710
  - Density: 5,100/km^{2} (13,000/sq mi)
- Time zone: UTC+1 (CET)
  - Summer (DST): UTC+2 (CEST)
- Postal code: 4827
- Area code: 076

Geeren-Zuid is a neighbourhood within the city Breda. As of 2025, Geeren-Zuid has 3,710 residents.

Geeren-Zuid borders Biesdonk, Teteringen, Doornbos-Linie, Geeren-Noord and Waterdonken.

== Development ==
The Vuchtpolder, the area now known as the Hoge Vucht in Breda was part of municipality Teteringen between 1795 and 1961. Vuchtpolder got annexed in small bits in 1927, 1942 and 1961. Geeren-Zuid was built in the 60s, the same with Geeren-Noord and other neighbourhoods in the Hoge Vucht.

Geeren-Zuid has mostly 2-story houses, but there are also apartment buildings. In 2013 more apartments were built at the Claas Persoonsstraat and Pieter De Swartstraat.

== Demographics ==
Seeing in this table below, the greatest age group in Geeren-Zuid are young adults, having 29% of the population.

Age distribution in Geeren-Zuid
Age group	Amount in numbers	Percentage
0-15	570	15.4%
15-25	500	13.5%
25-45	1080	29.1%
45-65	880	23.7%
65 or older	680	18.3%

68,1% of residents are local-born residents, 31,9% are foreign-born residents.

79,7% of foreign-born residents are born outside of Europe, 20,3% are born inside of Europe.

== Facilities ==
At the Johan Metzelaarstraat, there is an elementary school named De Fontein.

At the Kapittelweg, there is a pharmacy called Medsen.

== Transportation ==
Bus 2 stops 4 times in Geeren-Zuid. Bus 2 goes from the Haagse Beemden to the Hoge Vucht.
