= Teteringen Girl =

Murdered girl in the Netherlands, 1990

- Born: c. 1965–1975; Unknown
- Died: c. December 1990; Unknown
- Cause of death: Starvation and exhaustion
- Body discovered: 25 December 1990, Teteringen, Breda, Netherlands
- Resting place: Groenstraat, Teteringen (located directly across from the Sint-Willibrorduskerk), Breda, Netherlands
- Known for: Unidentified victim of homicide; unsolved murder
- Height: 5 ft 4 in (160 cm)

The Teteringen Girl (Dutch: Meisje van Teteringen; French: La jeune fille de Teteringen) is an unidentified teenaged girl or woman found dead on 25 December 1990 in the Cadettenkamp forest outside of Teteringen, a village northeast of Breda, Netherlands. She is one of the 41 unidentified women mentioned in Interpol's Operation Identify Me.

== Circumstances ==
The Teteringen Girl was found by hikers near a trail near Galgestraat and Cadettenkamp (close to the A27 Motorway) on Christmas Day, 1990. The body was wrapped in a rug and covered with several blankets. She was wearing a red turtleneck sweater from a brand called Carine (which could only be purchased in Belgium at the time) and burgundy red corduroy trousers. She was not wearing socks, undergarments, or shoes.

== Physical characteristics ==
The Teteringen Girl was 163 cm tall (approximately five feet four inches), with an olive complexion, and is estimated to have been between the ages of 15 and 25 at the time of her death.

Her cause of death was determined to be starvation and exhaustion. Her body was emaciated, with bite marks on her skin. There was also evidence that cigarettes had been put out on her skin as well.

She was assumed to be of Moroccan descent.

== Investigation ==
It is believed that the Teteringen Girl lived in the Netherlands or another central European country (such as Belgium, France, Luxembourg, or Germany) for at least five years before her death. Although arrests were made after the discovery of her body, the case went cold.

In 2006, her body was exhumed for further investigation. It was determined via DNA that she had ties to a Moroccan community in Antwerp, Belgium. In 2023, her case was one of the 22 listed in Interpol's Operation Identify Me.

== See also ==
- List of unsolved murders (1980–1999)
