= Geeren-Noord =

- Neighbourhood
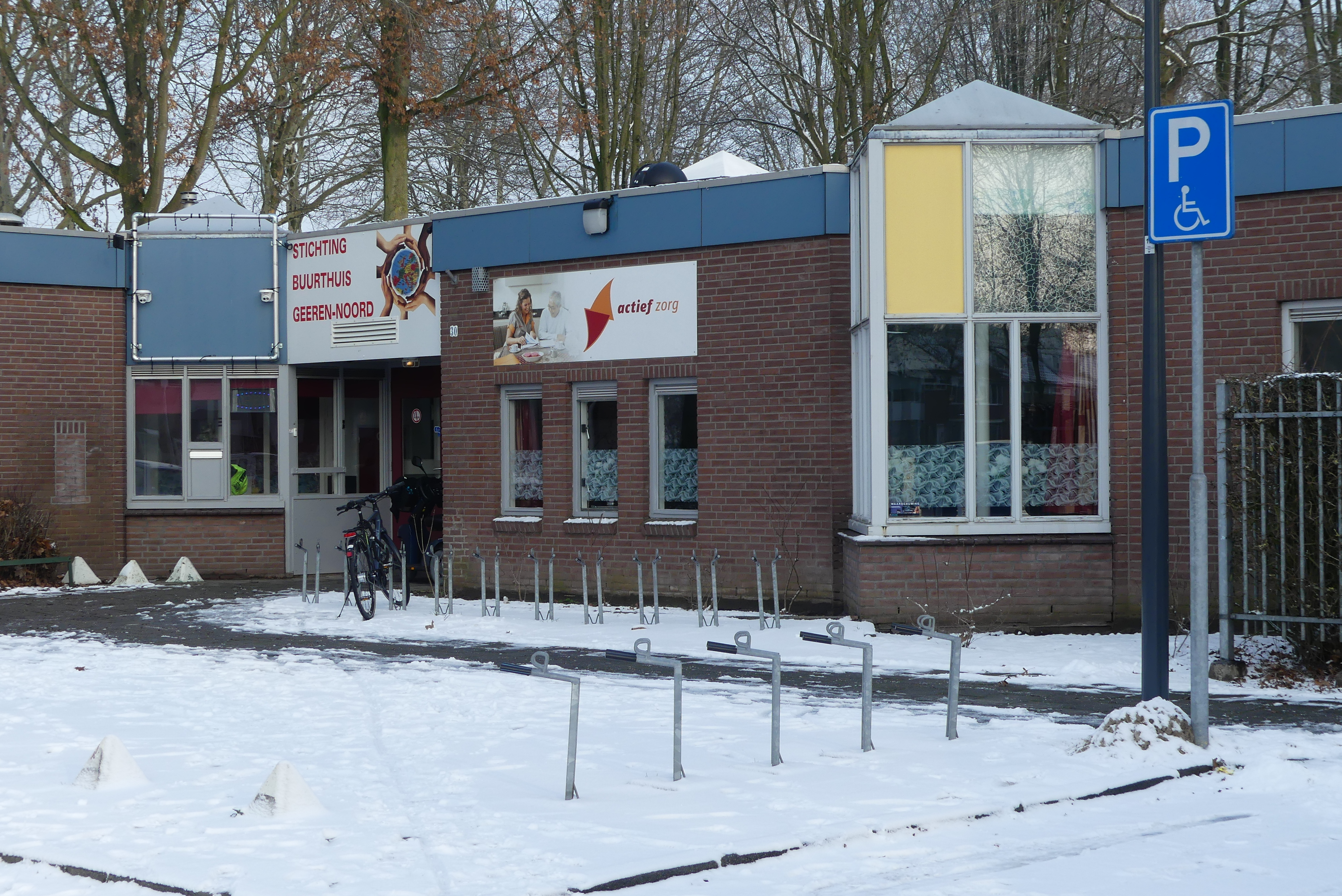
- Community Center of Geeren-Noord

- Flag

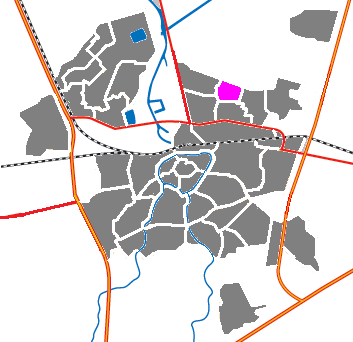
- Location of Geeren-Noord within Breda in pink
- Country: Netherlands
- Province: North Brabant
- Municipality: Breda
- City: Breda
- Established: 1967

Area
  - Total: 0.49 km^{2} (0.19 sq mi)
  - Land: 0.45 km^{2} (0.17 sq mi)
  - Water: 0.04 km^{2} (0.015 sq mi)

Population (2026)
  - Total: 2,663
  - Density: 5,900/km^{2} (15,000/sq mi)
- Time zone: UTC+1 (+1)
  - Summer (DST): UTC+2 (+2)
- Postal code: 4827
- Area codes: 076

Geeren-Noord is a neighbourhood of Breda with 2,663 inhabitants (2026).

Geeren-Noord borders Geeren-Zuid, Wisselaar, Biesdonk and Waterdonken.

== History ==
Geeren-Noord was built between 1967 and 1969. Before that, the area already had the name Geeren. Geeren-Noord is a neighbourhood consisting of mostly high-rise buildings, just like many other neighbourhoods built in the same years.

== Demographics ==
Geeren-Noord has 2,675 inhabitants. As seen in the table below, most people are working-age adults.

Age group	Amount in numbers	Percentage
0-15	395	14.8%
15-25	370	13.8%
25-45	710	26.5%
45-65	700	26.2%
65 and older	505	18.9%

63,2% of inhabitants are born in the Netherlands, 36,8% is born outside of the Netherlands.

77,2% of immigrants are born outside of Europe, 22,8% of immigrants are born inside of Europe.

== Facilities ==
In Geeren-Noord, there is only 1 elementary school named Het Noorderlicht.

There is a community center at the Philips Lammekensstraat.

== Transportation ==
Bus 2 goes from Haagse Beemden to Hoge Vught (where Geeren-Noord is part of). Geeren-Noord has 3 bus stops on that lane.
