= Heul Girl =

Unidentified murder victim

- Born: c. 1960–1964; Possibly West Germany
- Died: c. September 1976
- Cause of death: Homicide
- Body discovered: 24 October 1976, Maarsbergen, Netherlands
- Known for: Unidentified victim of homicide; unsolved murder
- Height: 4 ft 9 in — 5 ft 5 in (150 and 160 cm)

The Heul Girl (Dutch: Heulmeisje) was a murder victim found on 24 October 1976 at the former De Heul parking lot on the A12, in Maarsbergen, between Arhem and Utrecht, the Netherlands by hikers. Her body has never been identified. She was found naked underneath branches and soil.

== Case summary ==
It was assumed for many years that the naked, leaf-covered body belonged to a missing 18-year-old girl from a neighbouring village. However, that theory was ruled out in 2006 when the missing girl, now an adult, reported to the police.

Based on later research on the epiphyseal plates, the Heul Girl would have been 12 to 15 years old at the time of death, putting her date of birth between 1960 and 1965. Isotope research on her teeth showed that the girl probably lived between the Ruhr and Eifel regions of Germany for the first seven years of her life. Around 1975, the child was likely in East Germany or Eastern Europe. The year prior to her death, she supposedly stayed in either West Germany or the Netherlands. In that year, the girl received particularly poor nutrition, which may indicate extreme poverty or a possible kidnapping.

In 2012, a witness stated that in 1976, multiple people saw the girl being "thrown out" by two men between the ages of 30 and 40.

In 2013, both the Opsporing Verzocht program and the German variant Aktenzeichen XY... ungelöst aired episodes on the case.

In 2016, the German judiciary gave permission to start a large-scale investigation based on the girl's DNA. This is a joint operation by both countries, in which DNA databases from both countries will be utilised. At the end of 2018, the Utrecht police confirmed that DNA testing had not started yet.

In 2023, the case was part of Operation Identify Me by Interpol to identify 22 unidentified women who were found deceased in the Netherlands, Belgium and Germany between 1976 and 2019.

In April 2026 authorities reopened her grave, only to discover her skull was missing. A search of a police evidence storage location led to them locating her skull, but they were unable to find her lower jaw. Her skull was replaced in the grave, while the search for her jawbone continues. Authorities said if they located her lower jaw, they would reopen her grave again to return it.

== See also ==
- Cold case
- Forensic identification
- List of unsolved murders (1900–1979)
- Unidentified decedent
