= Wisselaar =

- Neighborhood
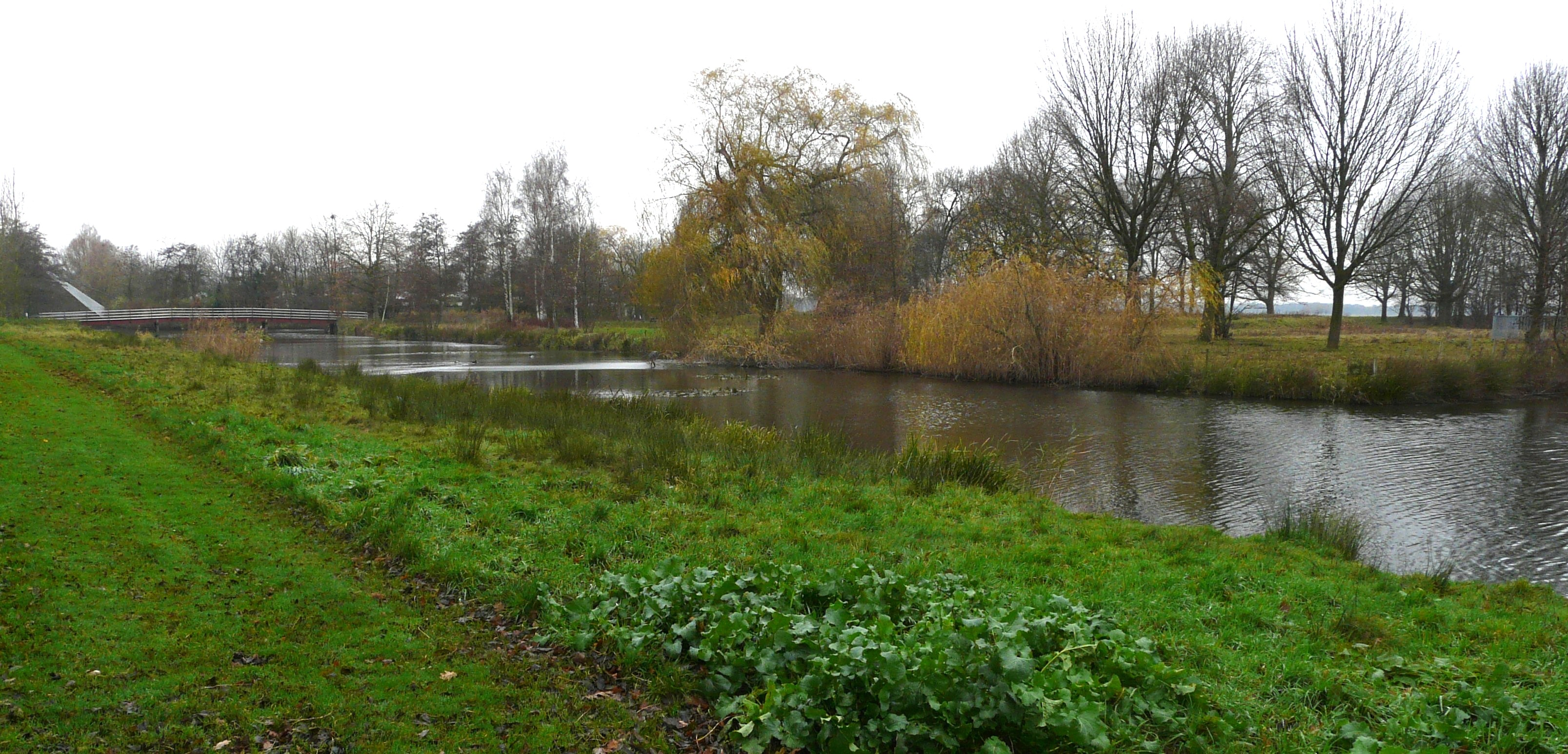
- Photo of nature in Wisselaar

- Photo of Wisselaar in red
- Country: Netherlands
- Province: North Brabant
- Municipality: Breda
- City: Breda

Area
  - Total: 0.78 km^{2} (0.30 sq mi)
  - Land: 0.75 km^{2} (0.29 sq mi)
  - Water: 0.03 km^{2} (0.012 sq mi)

Population (2025)
  - Total: 4,245
  - Density: 5,700/km^{2} (15,000/sq mi)
- Time zone: UTC+1 (CET)
  - Summer (DST): UTC+2 (CEST)
- Postal code: 4826
- Area code: 076

Wisselaar is a neighborhood in the city of Breda, in the Netherlands. Wisselaar has 4,245 residents (2025). It borders industrial area Krogten and neighborhoods Biesdonk, Geeren-Noord and Vuchtpolder.

== Development ==
The Vuchtpolder, the area now known as the Hoge Vucht in Breda was part of municipality Teteringen between 1795 and 1961. Vuchtpolder got annexed in small bits in 1927, 1942 and 1961. Wisselaar was built in the 60s, the same with Biesdonk and other neighborhoods in the Hoge Vucht. It was the 4th and last neighborhood built in the Hoge Vucht.

Sportboulevard Wisselaar, an area with swimming pools and an ice skating rink is built in the 90s.

There are also some new flats, built in 2011 and 2020.

== Demographics ==
As demonstrated by this table below, the largest age group in Wisselaar is young adults (aged 25–45).2

| Age group | Amount in numbers | Percentage |
|---|---|---|
| 0-15 | 690 | 16.3% |
| 15-25 | 575 | 13.5% |
| 25-45 | 1185 | 27.9% |
| 45-65 | 1020 | 24% |
| 65 and above | 775 | 18.3% |

72,4% of residents are local-born residents, and 27,6% are foreign-born residents.

75,2% of foreign-born residents are born outside of Europe, and 24,8% are born inside of Europe.

== Facilities ==
There is an elementary school called KBS De Wisselaar.

At Sportboulevard Wisselaar, there are many facilities in the theme of sport such as a health club, a swimming pool, an ice skating rink, a trampoline park and an inflatable park.

There is also a GP's office.

== Transportation ==
Bus 1 starts in Wisselaar and goes to Breda railway station and goes through Brabantpark and ends in Heusdenhout.
