= Operation Captura =

Operation by United Kingdom and Spanish law enforcement

- Date: Launched 2006
- Duration: Ongoing
- Location: Spain
- Also known as: Most Wanted (2022 relaunch)
- Type: Law enforcement operation
- Target: UK fugitives hiding in Spain
- Participants: Spanish law enforcement
- Outcome: Capture of numerous fugitives
- Arrests: 86 by 2022 (previous campaign), 96 total by June 2019 (all but 10 captured by February 2020)

Operation Captura is a multi-agency operation to detain criminals wanted by UK law enforcement who are hiding in Spain. In particular, the National Crime Agency (NCA) and crime-fighting charity Crimestoppers launch appeals—the ninth was launched in 2015—seeking Britain's most wanted fugitives, aiming for maximum news media coverage. While UK agencies have no mandate to operate outside the UK, the operation provides anonymous call facilities in Spain, seeking to locate suspects for whom a European Arrest Warrant has been issued, who can then be arrested by local law enforcement and their extradition to the UK sought. Spanish law enforcement: the Fugitive Location Group of the National Police and the Manhunt Squad of the Guardia Civil, actively cooperate with the operation.

Operation Captura was launched in 2006; by June 2019, 96 fugitives had been listed. All but ten had been captured by February 2020.

Following on the success of Operation Captura, two other similar campaigns were launched, Operation Return in the Netherlands and Operation Zygos in Cyprus.

In 2022 a new appeal for information to trace and capture British fugitives in Spain was launched by the NCA in partnership with partners with charity CrimeStoppers, Spanish law enforcement and UK Police, listing the names and photographs of twelve known offenders, and stating that the previous campaign had led to the arrest of 86 offenders. The new campaign was named "Most Wanted". One fugitive was captured within 24 hours of the launch of the new campaign.

== See also ==
- Operation Identify Me - another multi country appeal for citizen crime assistance.
- Simon Dutton (drug dealer)
