= Falkenhagener Feld =

- Quarter of Berlin
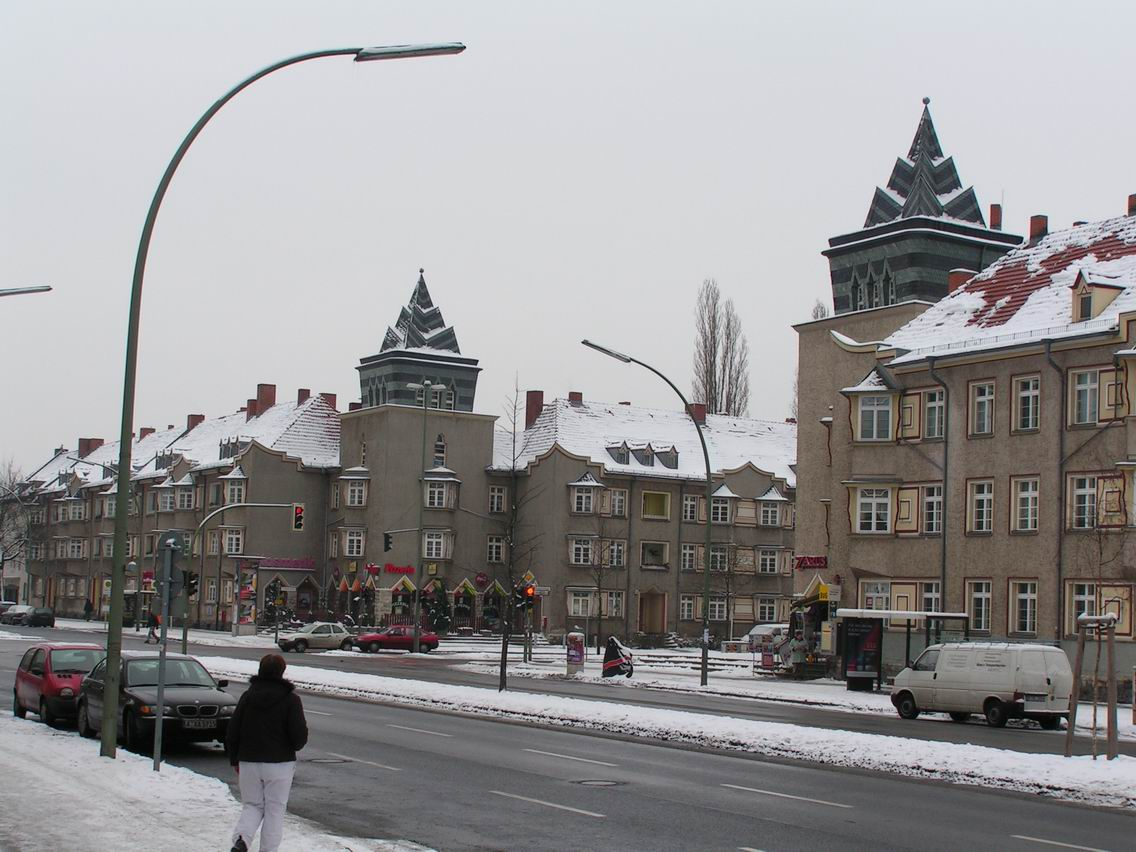
- Falkenseer Chaussee/Zeppelinstraße

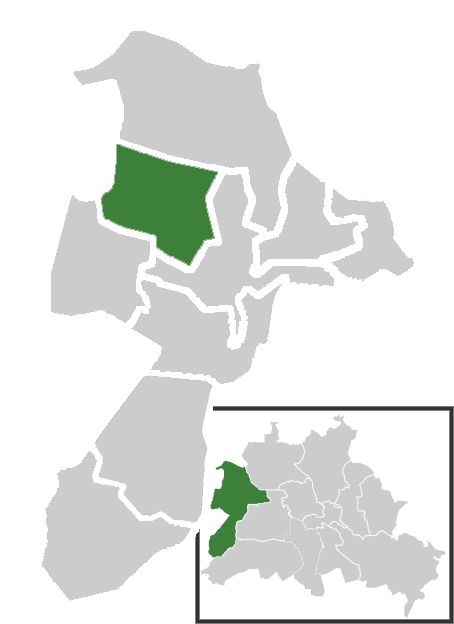
- Location of Falkenhagener Feld in Spandau district and Berlin
- Interactive map of Falkenhagener Feld
- Location within Germany Location within Berlin
- Coordinates: 52°32′49″N 13°10′40″E
- Country: Germany
- State: Berlin
- City: Berlin
- Borough: Spandau
- Founded: 1962

Area
  - Total: 6.88 km^{2} (2.66 sq mi)
- Elevation: 40 m (130 ft)

Population (2024-12-31)
  - Total: 39,922
  - Density: 5,800/km^{2} (15,000/sq mi)
- Time zone: UTC+01:00 (CET)
  - Summer (DST): UTC+02:00 (CEST)
- Postal codes: 13583, 13589
- Vehicle registration: B

Falkenhagener Feld (German pronunciation: [ˈfalkŋ̍ˌhaːɡənɐ ˈfɛlt]) is a German locality (Ortsteil) of Berlin in the borough (Bezirk) of Spandau.

== History ==
The project to build a residential complex in the rural area of west Spandau and close to the village of Falkenhagen, started in 1962. The locality, situated at the borders of West Berlin with East Germany, was crossed by the Berlin Wall until 1989. In 2003 it became an autonomous Ortsteil, separated (with Hakenfelde and Wilhelmstadt) from the one of Spandau.

== Geography ==
Located in the north-western suburb of Berlin, Falkenhagener Feld borders with the Brandenburger town of Falkensee and its parish Falkenhagen (eponym of the locality), in the district of Havelland (district). Its bordering localities of Berlin are Hakenfelde, Spandau and Staaken. Close to the boundary with this one there are located the little lakes Spektelake and Großer Spektesee.

== Transport ==
Falkenhagener Feld is not served by railways, it is simply traversed by the industrial track of the Osthavelländische Eisenbahn and the Berlin-Hamburg line (in south). It is served by the bus lines M37, 130, 131, 134, 137 and 337.

== Photogallery ==
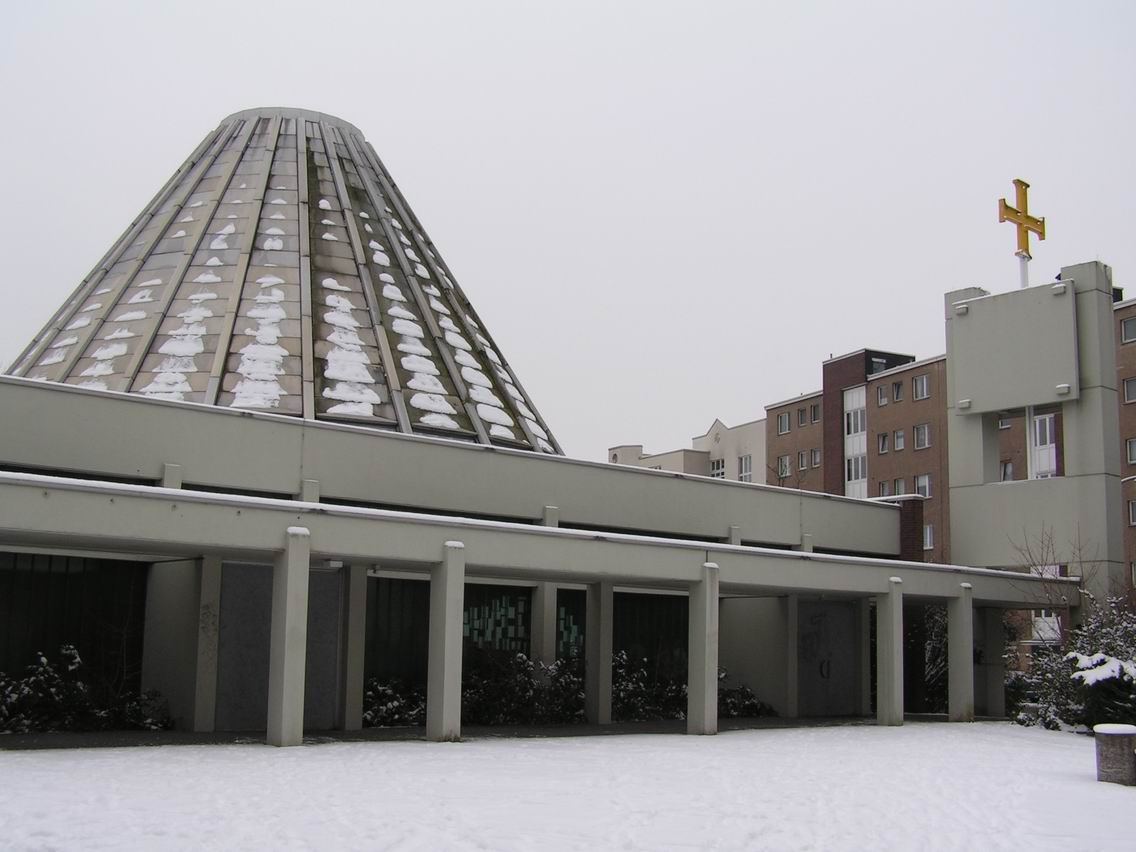
St. Markus church

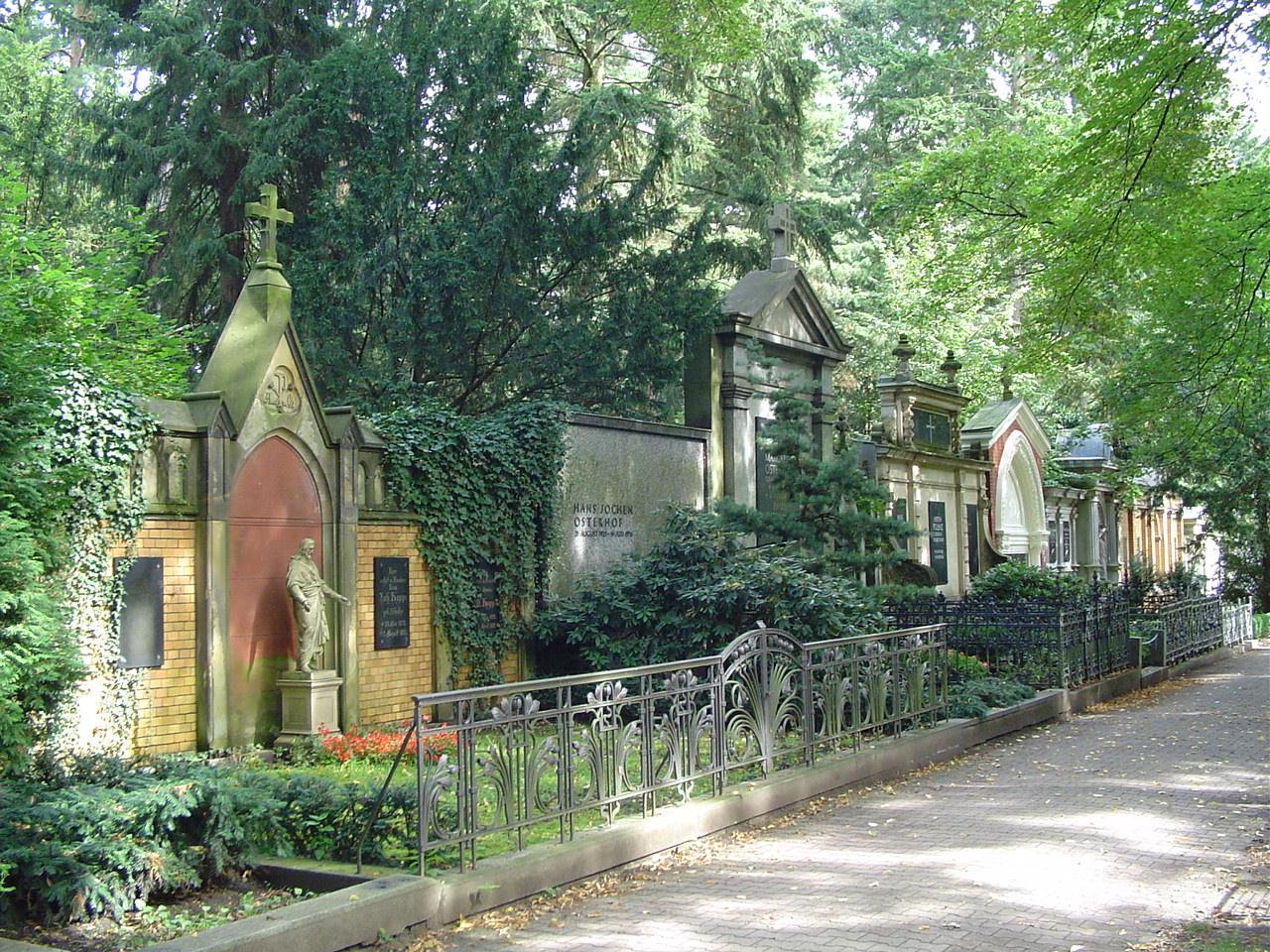
The cemetery of Kisseln

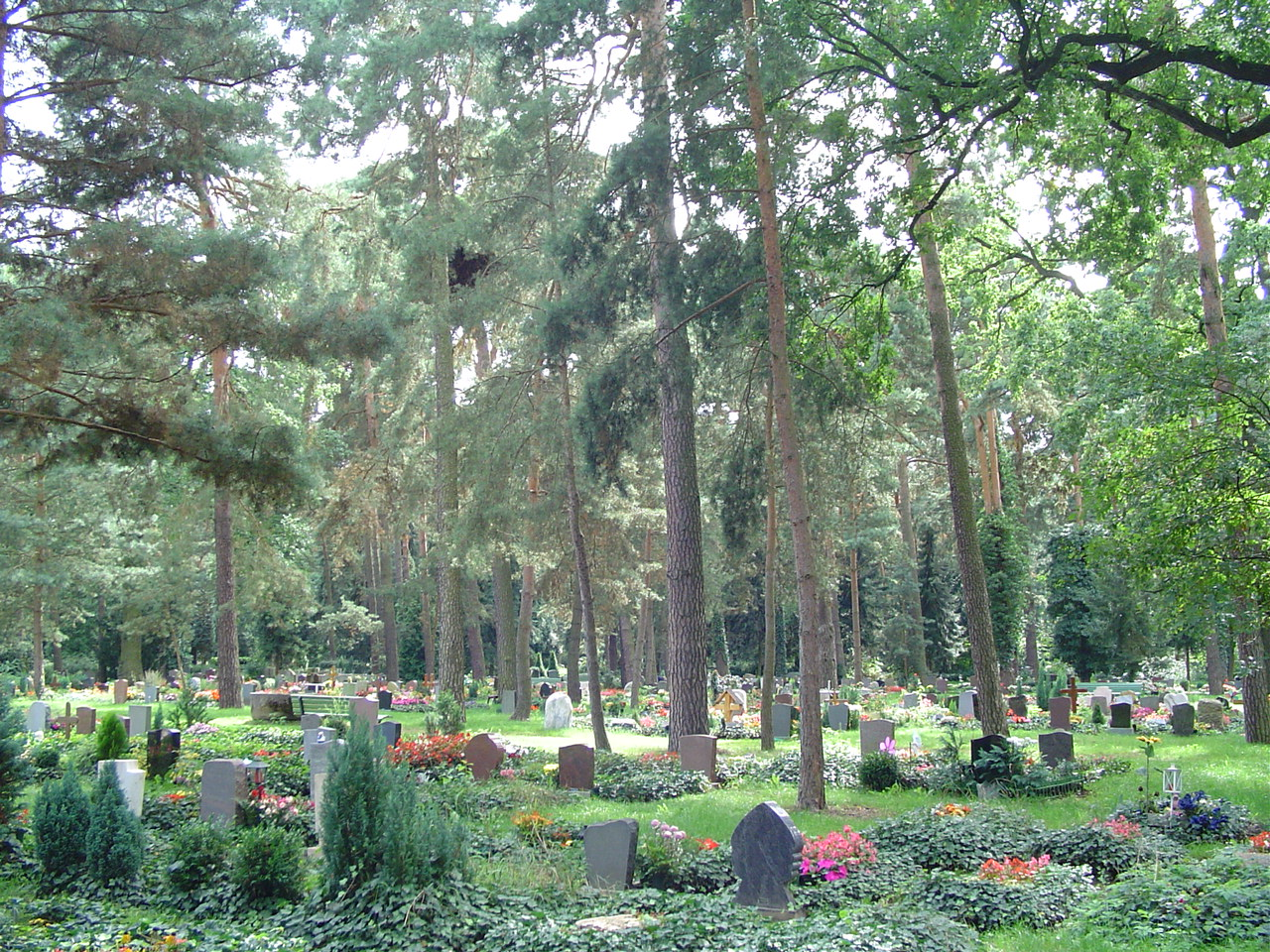
Graves at Kisseln cemetery
