= Girl from the Main =

Formerly unidentified German murder victim

The Girl from the Main refers to a previously unidentified murder victim found in the Main River in Frankfurt, Germany. The decedent, aged 16 at the time of her death, had been physically abused and finally murdered before being dumped into the river, when she was found on 31 July 2001. She was identified in 2026 as Diana S.

== Case summary ==
On 31 July 2001, around 2:50 PM, passers-by found the wrapped and bound nude body of a 15-to-16-year-old girl. The body had a number of injuries all over which indicated serious abuse suffered over a period of years, none of which had been treated by a doctor. Among other things, her arms were malformed as a result of healed fractures, there were numerous longer scars in the area of the legs, trunk and forehead, burn scars from cigarettes, and a cauliflower ear caused by injury were found during the autopsy.

It is believed that the girl looked about two years younger than her actual age, as she was in a stage of puberty more typical of that of a 13 year old girl. The girl was approximately 1.57 m (5 ft 2 in) tall, and weighed only 38.5 kg (85 lb). The girl had dark brown hair, about 30 cm (12 in) long. Her teeth were in poor condition, and there were no wisdom teeth. Her face was still in mostly recognizable condition, but her eye color was no longer ascertainable.

The victim's body had likely been in the water for 12–14 hours, and her murder had likely occurred approximately three days prior to discovery. Death occurred as a result of two fractured ribs that injured the lungs and spleen, caused by blunt force trauma. The body was tied up and weighed down with a parasol stand and thrown into the Main. Investigations revealed that the girl most likely was thrown into the water between the Griesheim barrage and the Wörthspitze. Among other things, due to a scarf-like object she had on her, it is assumed that the girl originated from the Pakistan-Afghanistan border area, but was living in the Frankfurt Rhine-Main area, perhaps as a domestic servant. However, on-site investigation revealed no clues about her identity or that of her killer(s). It cannot be excluded that the girl entered through diplomatic circles, in which investigations are difficult due to political immunity. The body was buried in the Heiligenstock cemetery; the funeral was financed by donations from the investigators.

The case consistently receives substantial attention even after more than ten years. She was included in Operation Identify Me's second phase in October 2024.

On 18 May 2026, Interpol reported that the girl was identified as 16-year old Diana S. Her father, a German national, was arrested in connection with her disappearance. It is assumed that Diana S. was killed through repeated punches at her home in Offenbach between 28 and 31 July 2001. The BKA credited the identification to an anonymous tip provided through Operation Identify Me.

== See also ==
- List of unsolved murders (2000–present)
- Unidentified decedent
