= Simon Dutton (drug dealer) =

Infamous cocaine dealer

Simon Dutton (born 1977) is a man known to be a criminal involved in large-scale cocaine dealing.

Dutton was born in Bolton, England, and at some time moved residence to Warrington.

Dutton was wanted by Greater Manchester Police and the Serious Organised Crime Agency. He was captured by police in Thessaloniki, Greece on 27 December 2015 as part of the National Crime Agency's Operation Captura.
