= Falkensee =

- Town
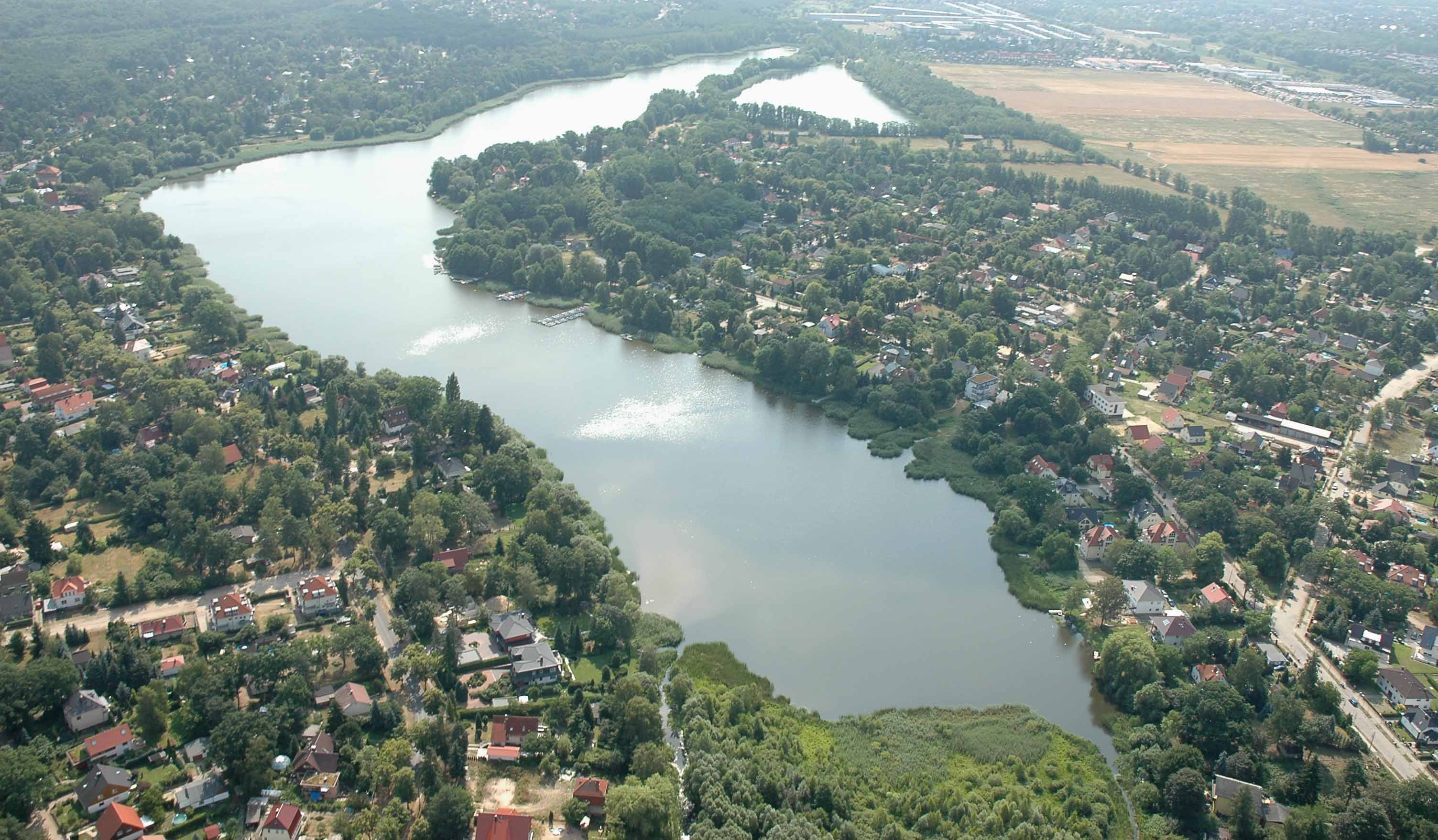
- Aerial view with Falkensee lake

- Coat of arms

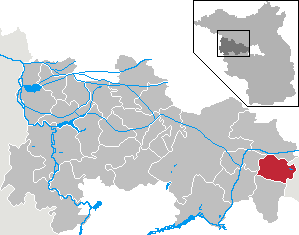
- Location of Falkensee within Havelland district
- Interactive map of Falkensee
- Location within Germany Location within Brandenburg
- Coordinates: 52°33′30″N 13°05′30″E
- Country: Germany
- State: Brandenburg
- District: Havelland
- Subdivisions: 6 Ortsteile

Government
  - Mayor (2023–31): Heiko Richter (Ind.)

Area
  - Total: 43.26 km^{2} (16.70 sq mi)
- Elevation: 32 m (105 ft)

Population (2025-12-31)
  - Total: 46,213
  - Density: 1,068/km^{2} (2,767/sq mi)
- Time zone: UTC+01:00 (CET)
  - Summer (DST): UTC+02:00 (CEST)
- Postal codes: 14612
- Dialling codes: 03322
- Vehicle registration: HVL (formerly NAU)
- Website: www.falkensee.de

Falkensee (German pronunciation: [falkn̩ˈzeː]) is a town in the Havelland district, Brandenburg, Germany. It is the most populated municipality of its district and it is situated at the western border of Berlin.

== History ==
Falkensee was formed in 1923 through the merger of Falkenhagen and Seegefeld. Its name comes from the initial syllables of Falkenhagen and Seegefeld.

During World War II, the Demag-Panzerwerke subcamp of the Sachsenhausen concentration camp was located here.

The subcamp was built in 1943 on the eastern outskirts of the town, on a site originally built in 1938 to house 650 railway workers. Up to 2,500 prisoners, mostly foreign, were interned there. They performed forced labor in the workshops of the German Reichsbahn and the DEMAG tank factory in Albrechtshof. Because the prisoners had learned of the murders during the death march of prisoners from the Lieberose subcamp to Sachsenhausen, they refused to comply with the order to evacuate on April 20, 1945. After the guards fled, the camp was liberated by arriving Soviet troops.

In November, 1945, the city issued six postage stamps of its own depicting a dove of peace. A memorial to the victims is located on the eastern edge of the town near the border with Spandau.

The municipality shared its borders with the former West Berlin and so, between 1961 and 1990, it was separated from it by the Berlin Wall.

== Geography ==
Falkensee is located on the northwestern edge of Berlin, in the western part of the Warsaw-Berlin glacial valley and in the Zehdenick-Spandau Havel lowlands. To the north, Falkensee borders Schönwalde, to the west Brieselang, and to the south Dallgow-Döberitz. To the east, it borders the districts of Falkenhagener Feld and Staaken, which belong to Berlin-Spandau.

The development of Falkensee merges seamlessly into that of Berlin-Spandau to the east and Dallgow-Döberitz to the south. The largest body of water, the Falkenhagener See, is in the north of the city. Scheinwerferberg, in the north of the town, is a young geomorphological inland dune that was formed at the end of the Weichselian glaciation, and is 16 m (52 ft) high, 50 m (160 ft) above sea level. It is named after the anti-aircraft searchlights that were installed during World War II as part of the Berlin air defences.

== Demography ==
As a suburban municipality directly neighbouring Berlin, Falkensee grew alongside Berlin itself. After World War II, Falkensee's population shrunk, due to the relatively isolated position "behind" West Berlin, seen from the GDR capital. Since the fall of the Berlin Wall, Falkensee's population has doubled and continues to grow.

Due to the comparatively small urban area, Falkensee has a population density of almost 1,000 inhabitants per square kilometer, which is the third highest among the 113 Brandenburg cities (behind Wildau and Teltow), seventh highest among the 417 cities and municipalities in the state, and 280th highest among the more than 11,000 cities and municipalities in Germany.

Detailed data sources are to be found in the Wikimedia Commons.

Development of population since 1875 within the current boundaries (blue line: population; dotted line: comparison to population development of Brandenburg state)

Recent population development and projections (population development before census 2011 (blue line); recent population development according to the census in Germany in 2011 (blue bordered line); official projections for 2005-2030 (yellow line); for 2017-2030 (scarlet line); for 2020-2030 (green line)

Falkensee: Population development
within the current boundaries (2020)

| Year | Pop. | ±% p.a. |
|---|---|---|
| 1875 | 1,309 | — |
| 1890 | 1,558 | +1.17% |
| 1910 | 4,512 | +5.46% |
| 1925 | 8,180 | +4.05% |
| 1939 | 24,824 | +8.25% |
| 1950 | 29,189 | +1.48% |
| 1964 | 25,772 | −0.89% |

| Year | Pop. | ±% p.a. |
|---|---|---|
| 1971 | 26,007 | +0.13% |
| 1981 | 24,029 | −0.79% |
| 1985 | 23,340 | −0.72% |
| 1990 | 22,087 | −1.10% |
| 1995 | 24,273 | +1.91% |
| 2000 | 33,791 | +6.84% |
| 2005 | 38,376 | +2.58% |

| Year | Pop. | ±% p.a. |
|---|---|---|
| 2010 | 40,511 | +1.09% |
| 2015 | 42,634 | +1.03% |
| 2016 | 43,105 | +1.10% |
| 2017 | 43,552 | +1.04% |
| 2018 | 43,844 | +0.67% |
| 2019 | 43,994 | +0.34% |
| 2020 | 44,236 | +0.55% |

== Mayors ==
- May 1990-October 2007: Jürgen Bigalke (SPD)
- November 2007-October 2023: Heiko Müller (SPD)
- since November 2023: Heiko Richter (Independent)

== Transport infrastructure ==
Falkensee has a railway station on the Berlin-Hamburg railway. Local trains and Regional Express trains stop here at the two outer platforms, both located on siding tracks, so that long-distance trains linking Hamburg and Berlin can bypass on the two middle tracks. Two local stopping trains linking Nauen with Berlin call at Falkensee, one going via the Northern Ringbahn (circular railway) to the tunnel level of Berlin Hauptbahnhof, the other taking the Berlin Stadtbahn cross-city railway, terminating currently at Berlin Brandenburg airport.

The northern side of the Falkensee railway station is the central hub of the Falkensee bus network, and provides a covered stand for hundreds of bicycles.

Before the war, Falkensee was a stop on the suburban line from Nauen via Jungfernheide to Berlin Lehrter Bahnhof station, the Berlin terminus of the Berlin-Hamburg railway. From August 1951 to the end of the 1950s, the Falkensee - Spandau and Spandau - Jungfernheide tracks were electrified with the Third Rail of the Berlin S-Bahn, allowing direct rail service from East Berlin to Falkensee, which was then part of the GDR. This link was severed by the Berlin Wall in 1961. From then on, until the reconstruction of the Berlin railway network in 1990, Falkensee could only be reached from East Berlin by the long detour via the Berlin outer ring.

== Notable people ==
- Hannjo Hasse (1921–1983), DEFA actor
- Carlos Rasch (1932–2021), science fiction author
- Klaus Bednarz (1942–2015), journalist
- Ingo Voge (born 1958), bobsledder
- Katarina Witt (born 1965), German actress and retired figure skater
