= Spandauer Forest =

Large forest area at the north-west edge of Berlin

Spandauer Forst
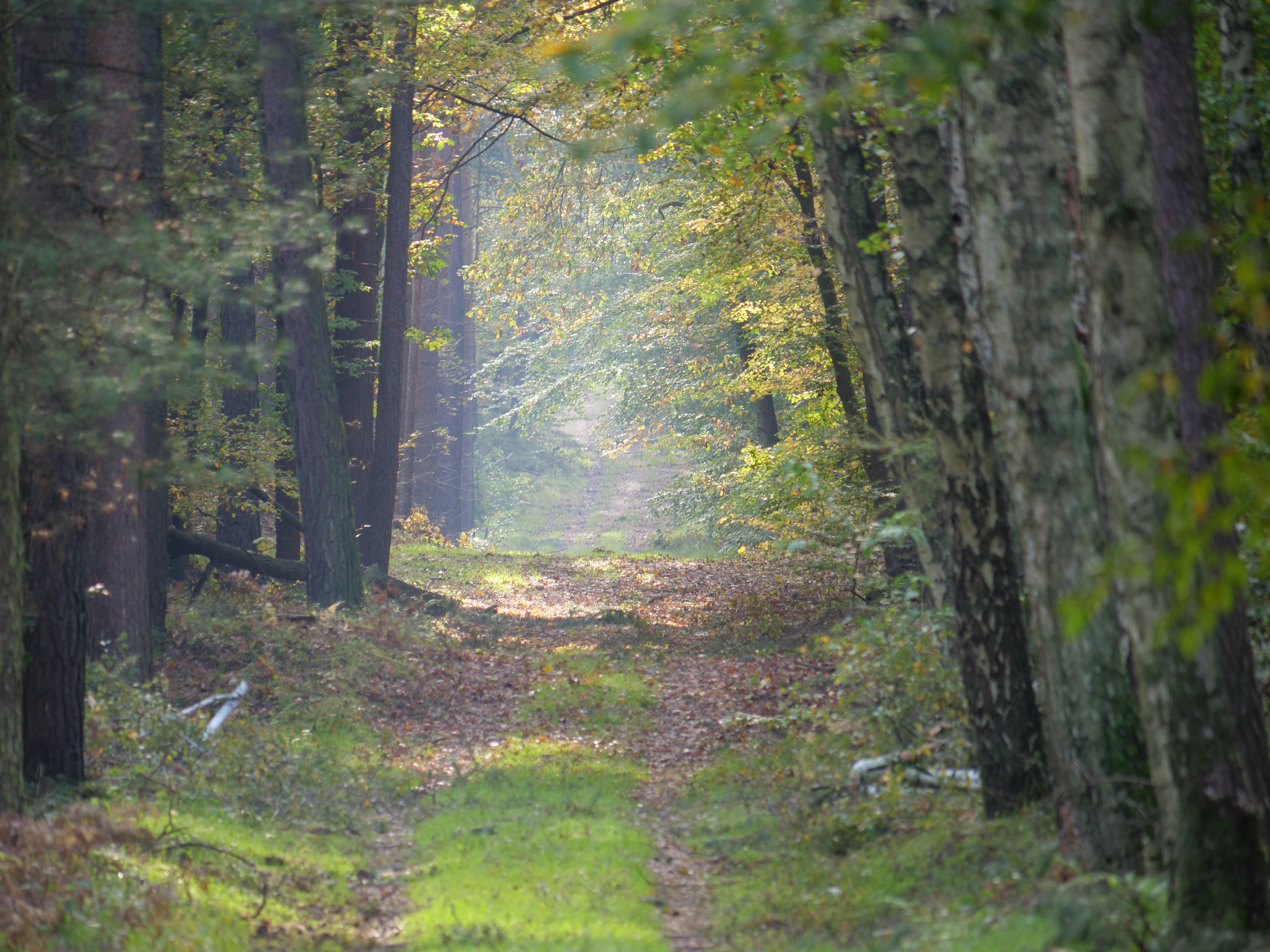
- A woodland path through a mixed forest in the eastern part of Spandauer Forst in autumn

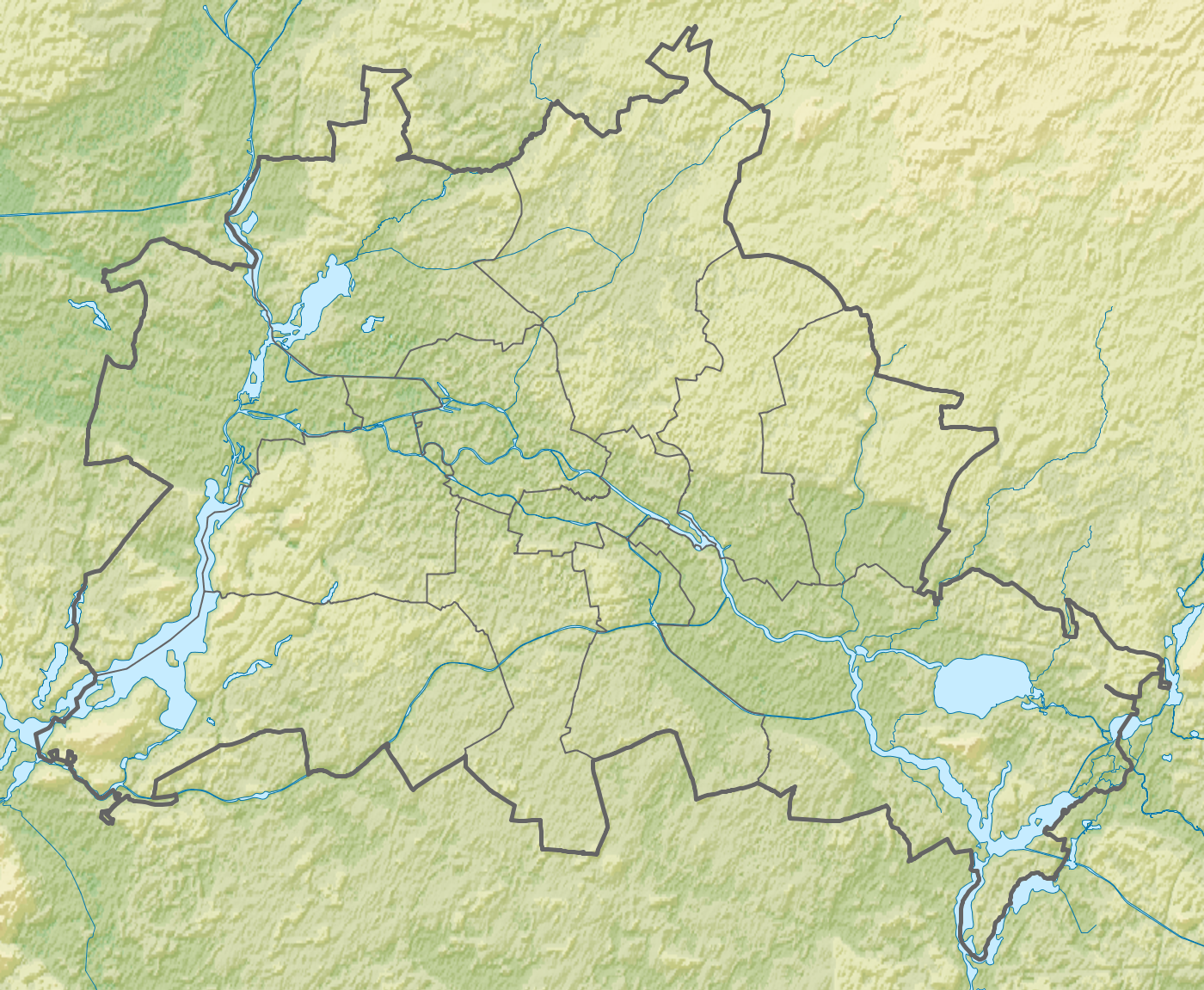
- Location within Berlin
- Interactive map of Spandauer Forst

Geography
- Location: Berlin-Spandau (Hakenfelde), Germany
- Coordinates: 52.579°N 13.172°E
- Area: 1,347.8 ha

Administration
- Established: (Designation as Natura 2000 site)
- Governing body: Senatsverwaltung für Umwelt, Verkehr und Klimaschutz Berlin / Berliner Forsten

The Spandauer Forst is a woodland area in the north-western outskirts of Berlin, Germany, located in the Hakenfelde quarter of the Spandau district. With an area of about 1,347.8 hectares, it is among the largest urban forest areas in Berlin. The forest is protected as part of the European Natura 2000 network, designated both as a Fauna-Flora-Habitat (FFH) site and a Special Protection Area (SPA) for birds, and contains several nature reserves.

== Location ==
The Spandauer Forst lies at the north-western edge of Berlin, bordering the municipalities of Falkensee and Schönwalde-Glien in Brandenburg to the north and west. In the east its boundary is formed by the state road L 172 (Niederneuendorfer Allee) and parts of the Havel River; to the south it borders residential areas, allotment gardens and the In den Kisseln cemetery. The state road L 16 (Schönwalder Allee) crosses the forest from Spandau town centre toward Schönwalde. The forest is largely located within the Hakenfelde locality of Berlin-Spandau.

== History ==
The woodland lies within the Berlin Urstromtal (glacial valley) and historically formed the town forest or "Stadtheide" of the then independent town of Spandau; it was long used for grazing, hunting and fuelwood. In the 18th century, drainage works such as the Nieder Neuendorfer Kanal were constructed to open land for use; later, groundwater extraction for the Spandau waterworks (operational since 1897) contributed to lowered water tables and drying of moors. From the late 20th century onward, re-wetting and compensation watering measures (including infiltration of treated Havel water via ditches and basins) were implemented to stabilize wetland habitats.

The forest and adjoining meadows today have multiple layers of legal protection. The current consolidated regulation for the landscape protection area and the nature reserves (including "Eiskeller und Spandauer Luchwald") was enacted on 22 December 2017 (effective January 2018). Earlier nature-reserve designations within the forest include Teufelsbruch und Nebenmoore and Großer und Kleiner Rohrpfuhl; both areas have long-standing protection with a modern management focus on re-wetting and habitat conservation.

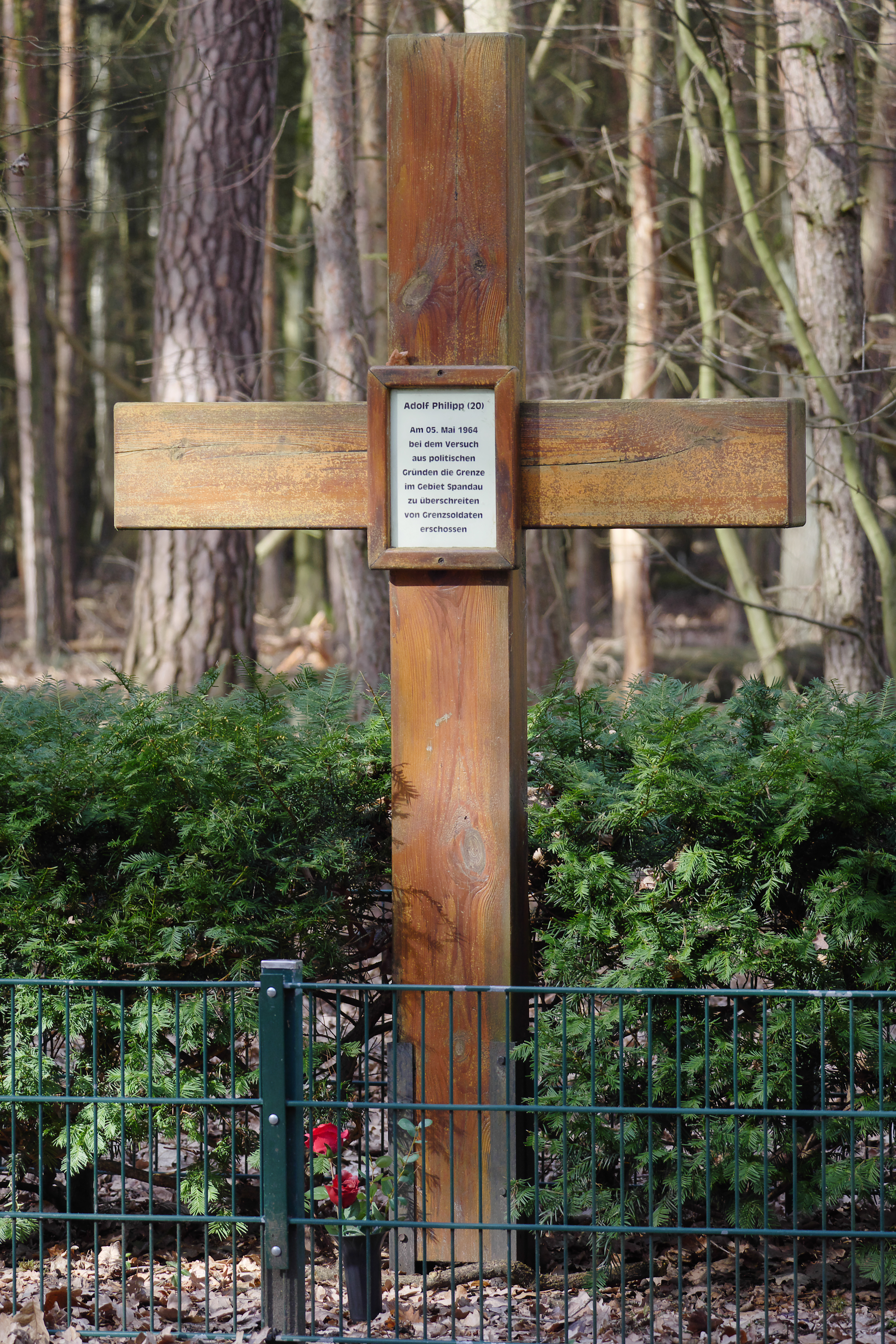
Wooden cross commemorating Adolf Philipp in Spandauer Forst (2017).

During the period of the Berlin Wall (1961–1989), the forest bordered the GDR; the nearby area of Eiskeller was a well-known West Berlin exclave connected by a narrow corridor. City-wide, at least 140 people were killed at the Berlin Wall or in direct connection with the border regime between 1961 and 1989. A documented case in the Spandauer Forst itself is the killing of the 20 years old Adolf Philipp in May 1964; a memorial cross near the northern edge of the forest commemorates him.

== Flora and fauna ==
Thanks in part to protection and restoration measures since the 1970s and 1980s, the Spandauer Forst now supports a rich variety of habitats, including mixed deciduous forest dominated by oak, birch, elm and ash; wetlands and moors; dry dune ridges and grassland; and the shores of the Havel. The forest hosts rare species such as the stag-beetle and provides habitat for amphibians, reptiles, and numerous bird species including kingfisher (Alcedo atthis) and little grebe (Tachybaptus ruficollis). Mammals include wild boar, foxes, badgers, and occasional beaver and otter. A 2025 feature described a well-known wild boar named "Günni", illustrating human–wildlife encounters in the forest.

== Protected status ==
The entire forest area is designated as a Landschaftsschutzgebiet (landscape protection area) and is part of the European Natura 2000 network, specifically as both a FFH (Fauna-Flora-Habitat) site and a SPA (Special Protection Area for birds). The site is numbered 3445-301 and covers 1,347.77 ha. Within the forest, three nature reserves have been established: the NSG Teufelsbruch and Nebenmoore (~48 ha), the NSG Großer and Kleiner Rohrpfuhl (~30.5 ha), and since December 2017 the NSG Eiskeller and Spandauer Luchwald.

== Cultural and memorial sites ==
Several memorials and monuments are located in or near the Spandauer Forst. A stone memorial marks the site of the former "Kronprinzen- und Prinz-Heinrich-Buche", planted in 1881 by Prince Heinrich of Prussia and the future Emperor Friedrich III after extinguishing a forest fire. A second memorial stone recalls the murder of psychologist Kirsten Sahling, who was attacked while jogging in the forest in June 2009. Near the northern boundary stands the wooden cross in memory of Adolf Philipp.

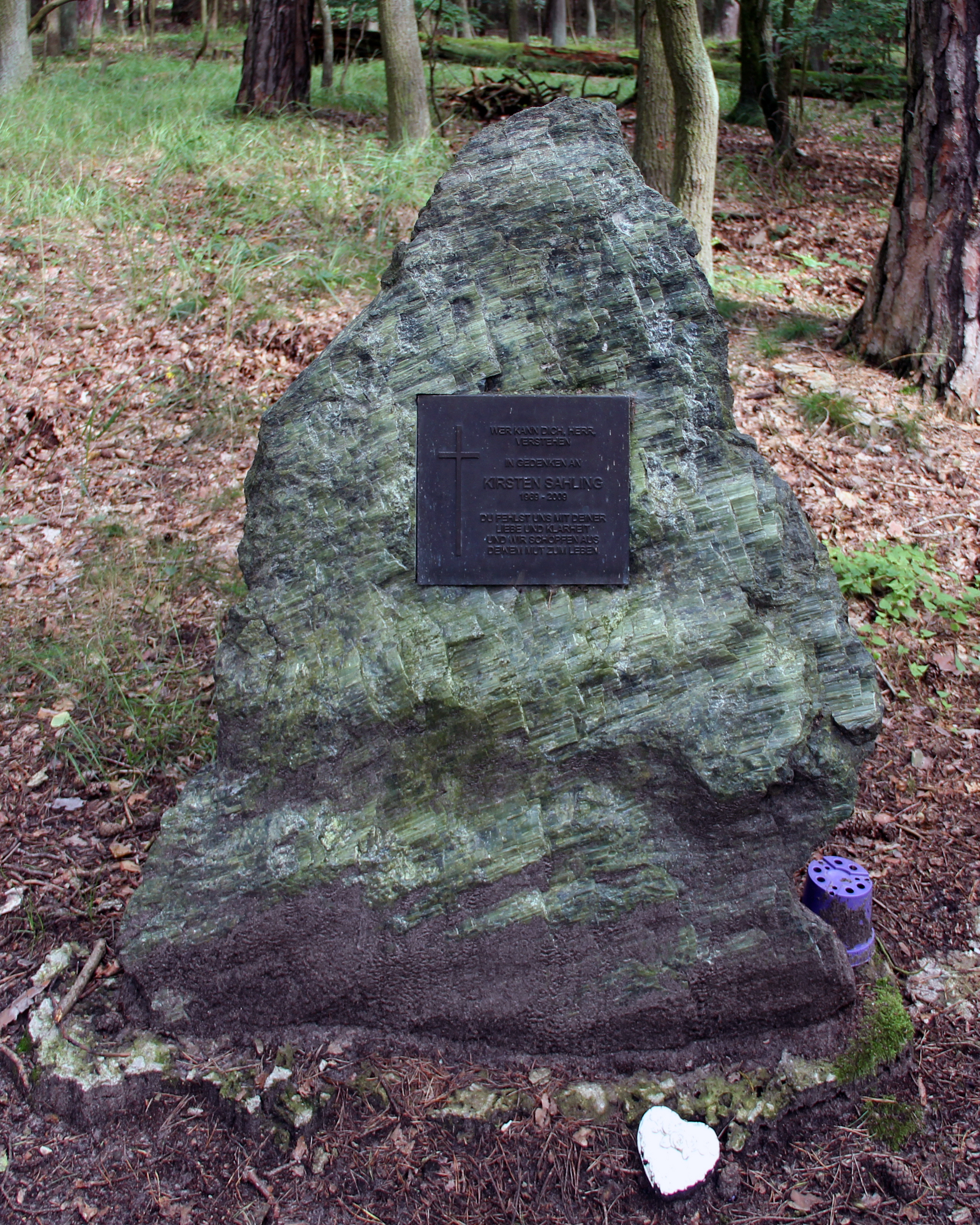
Memorial stone for Kirsten Sahling in Spandauer Forst (Hakenfelde).

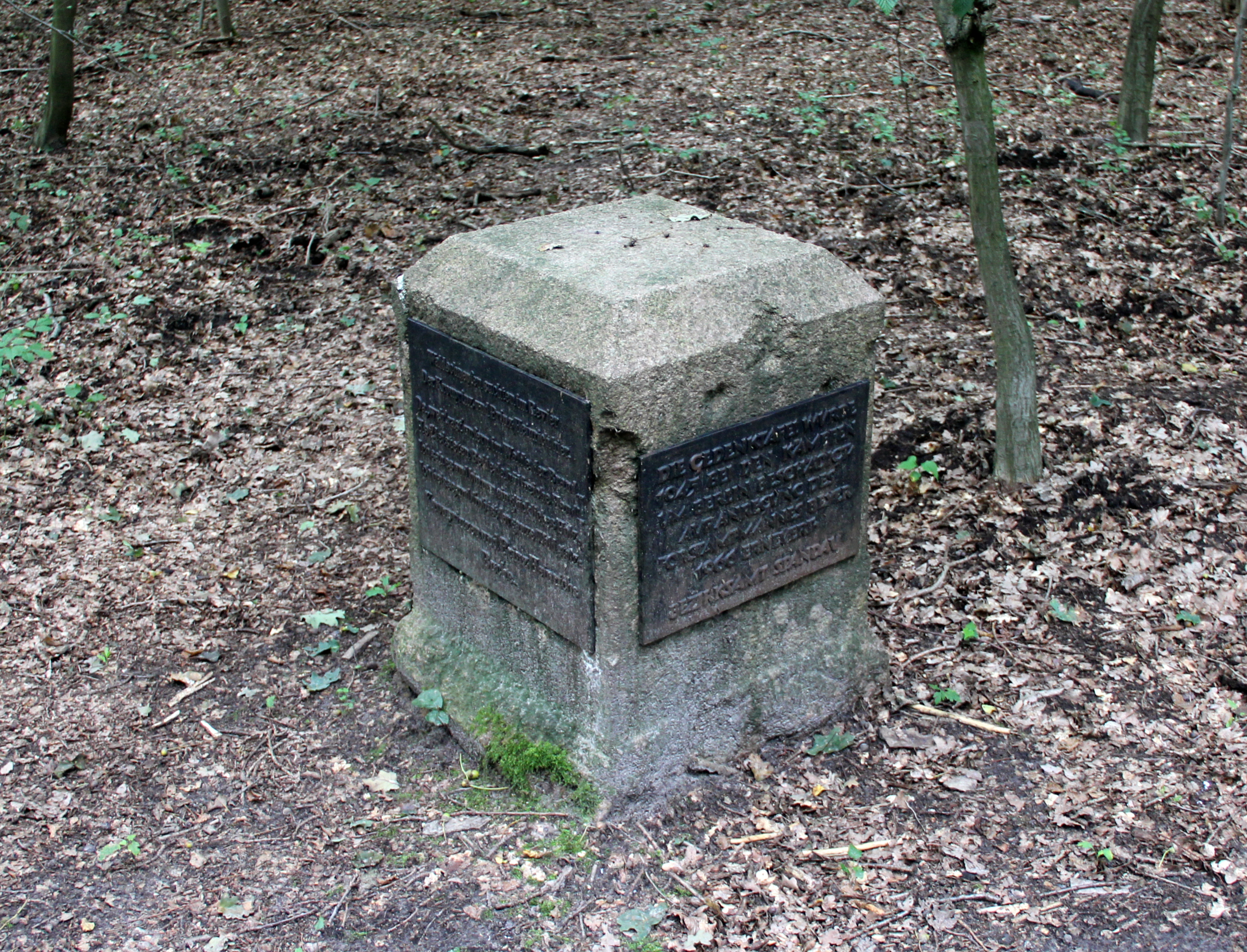
Memorial stone for the Kronprinzen- und Prinz-Heinrich-Buche, 2017.

== Recreation and access ==
The Spandauer Forst offers a wide network of hiking and cycling paths and is used extensively for recreation by residents of Berlin-Spandau and surrounding areas. It includes game enclosures with fallow deer and wild boar, and many quiet areas away from city traffic. In December 2023, a lake-bottom remediation project involving 350 trucks and 7,000 tonnes of material was delayed following concerns raised by environmental groups.
