= Carlos Rasch =

German author (1932–2021)

- Born: 6 April 1932; Brazil
- Died: 7 January 2021 (aged 88); Germany
- Occupation: Author

Carlos Rasch (6 April 1932 in Curitiba, Brazil – 7 January 2021) was a science fiction author, whose works mostly appeared in East Germany before German reunification.

== Biography ==
At the age of six, he moved with his parents from Brazil to Germany. In 1951, he started working as a reporter for the GDR's Allgemeiner Deutscher Nachrichtendienst. It was during his days as a reporter that he started writing literature. In 1965, he became a full-time writer. In addition to writing novels, he penned science-fiction short stories and radio dramas as well co-authoring the unproduced thirteen-part GDR television series Raumlotsen. There followed a period in which he was out of favor with the ruling powers and earned his keep through pick-up jobs and writing under pseudonyms. By the mid-80s, he was once again able to publish. From 1990 until he retired in 1997, he worked for the Märkische Allgemeine Zeitung in Potsdam.

== Selected publications ==
- Asteroidenjäger (1961; movie version produced by DEFA in 1970 as Signale – Ein Weltraumabenteuer, directed by Gottfried Kolditz)
- Der blaue Planet (1963)
- Der Untergang der Astronautic (1963)
- Im Schatten der Tiefsee (1965)
- Die Umkehr der Meridian. Raumfahrterzählung aus dem Jahre 2232 (1966)
- Das unirdische Raumschiff (1967)
- Rekordflug im Jet-Orkan (1970)
- Krakentang (1972)
- Magma am Himmel (1975)
- Vikonda (1986)
- Raumlotsen-Series

- Zurück zum Erdenball (2009)
- Orbitale Balance (2010)
- Daheim auf Erden (2011)
- Stern von Gea (2011)
