= Maarsbergen =

- Village
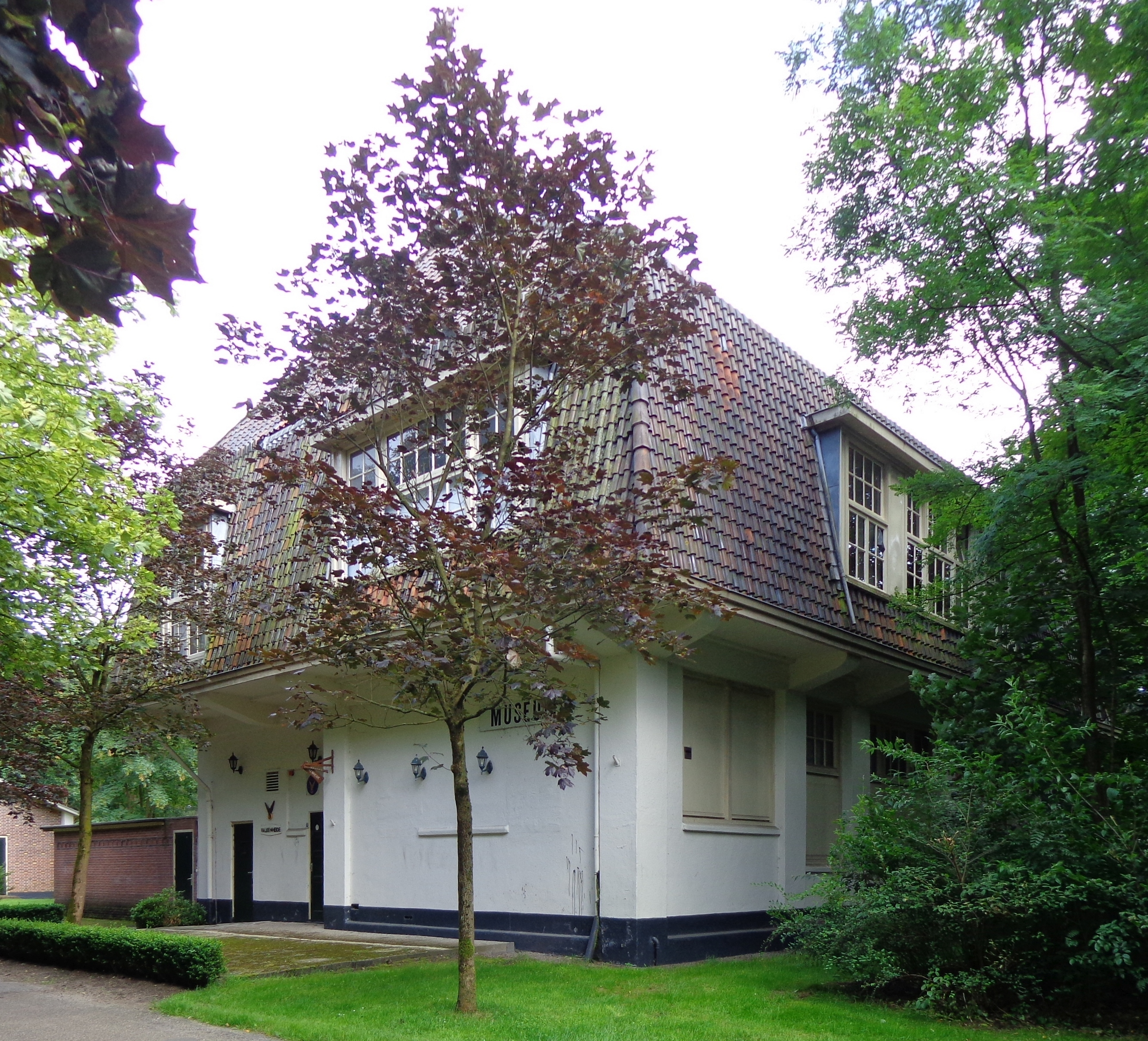
- Valkenheide museum

- Location in the Netherlands Maarsbergen (Netherlands)
- Coordinates: 52°3′27″N 5°24′19″E
- Country: Netherlands
- Province: Utrecht
- Municipality: Utrechtse Heuvelrug

Area
  - Total: 6.16 km^{2} (2.38 sq mi)
- Elevation: 8 m (26 ft)

Population (2021)
  - Total: 1,285
  - Density: 209/km^{2} (540/sq mi)
- Time zone: UTC+1 (CET)
  - Summer (DST): UTC+2 (CEST)
- Postal code: 3953
- Dialing code: 0343
- Major roads: A12, N226

Maarsbergen is a settlement in the Dutch province of Utrecht. It is a part of the municipality of Utrechtse Heuvelrug, and lies about 18 km east of Utrecht.

== History ==
It was first mentioned in 1134 as Merseberch. The etymology is unclear. The village developed near Huis Maarsbergen. Huis Maarsbergen was a 15th century walled castle. The castle was confiscated in 1656, and sold to Samuel de Marez who transformed it into an estate. The Dutch Reformed Church was built between 1883 and 1884, and a tower was added in 1934. In 1840, Maarsbergen was home to 262 people. Between 1845 and 1972, there was a railway station in Maarsbergen.

In 1934 it was the birthplace of Count Carel Pieter Antoni Jan Hubertus Godin de Beaufort, a motor racing driver who competed in Formula One between 1957 and 1964.

== Gallery ==
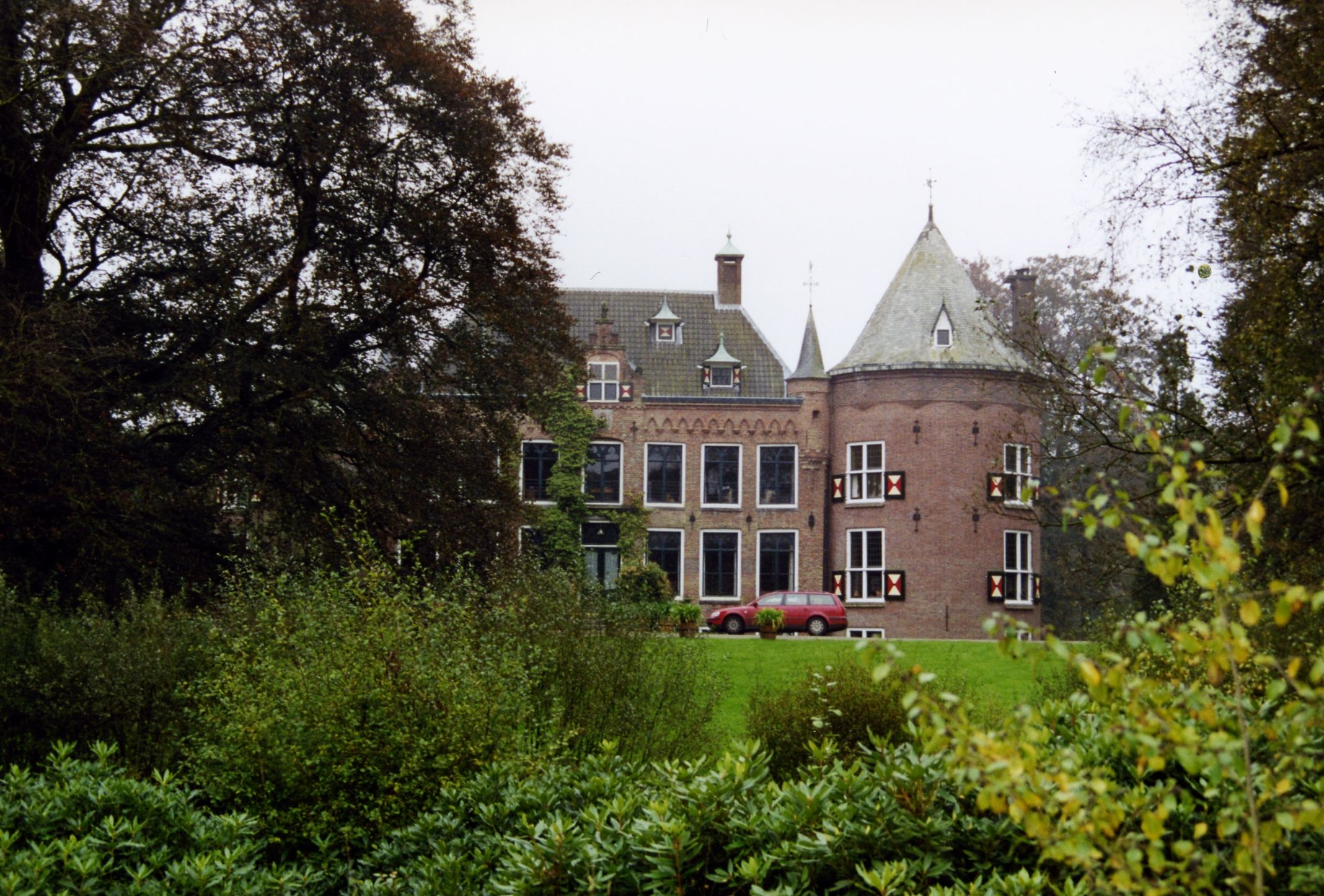
Huis Maarsbergen

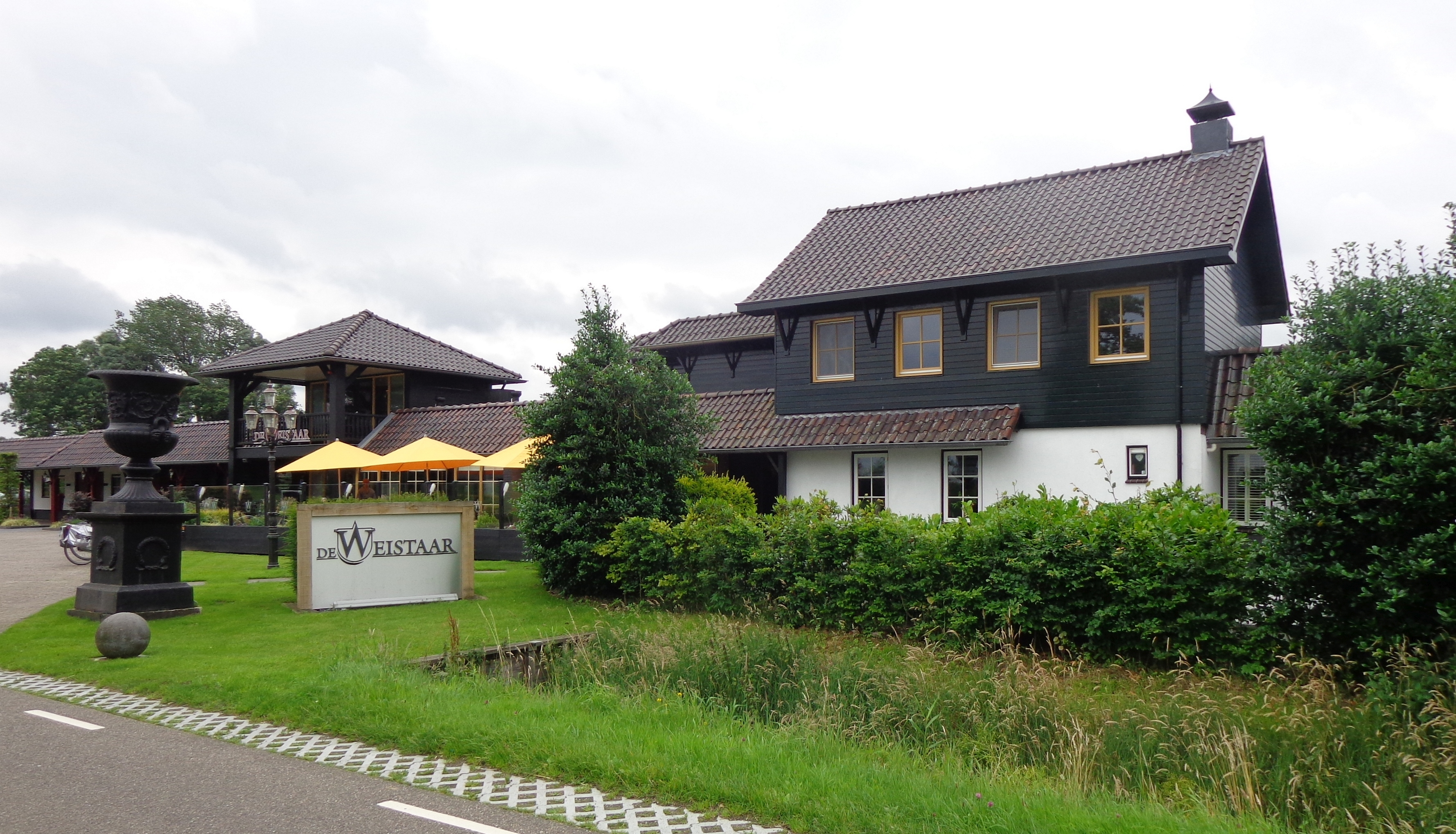
Hotel restaurant De Weistaar

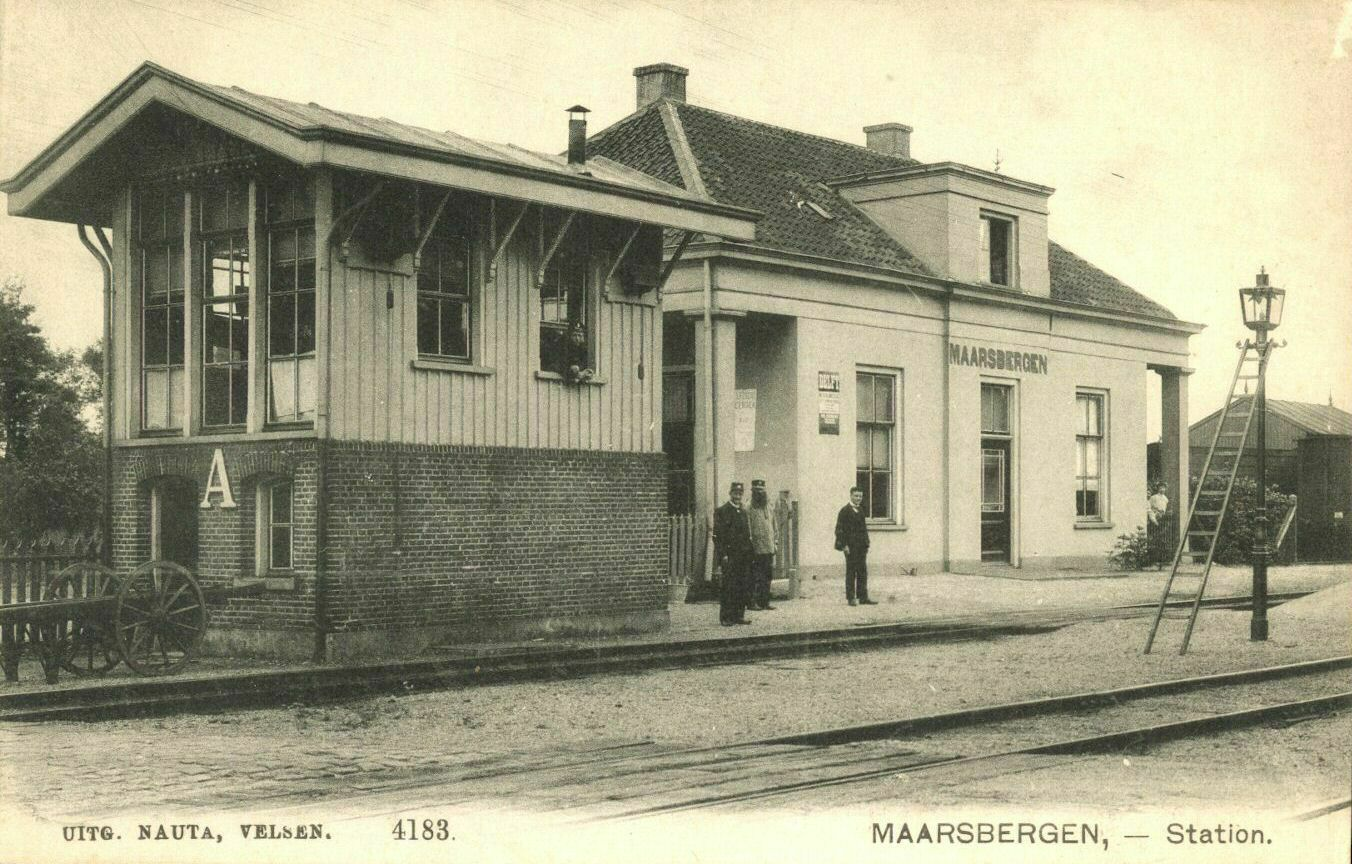
Former railway station

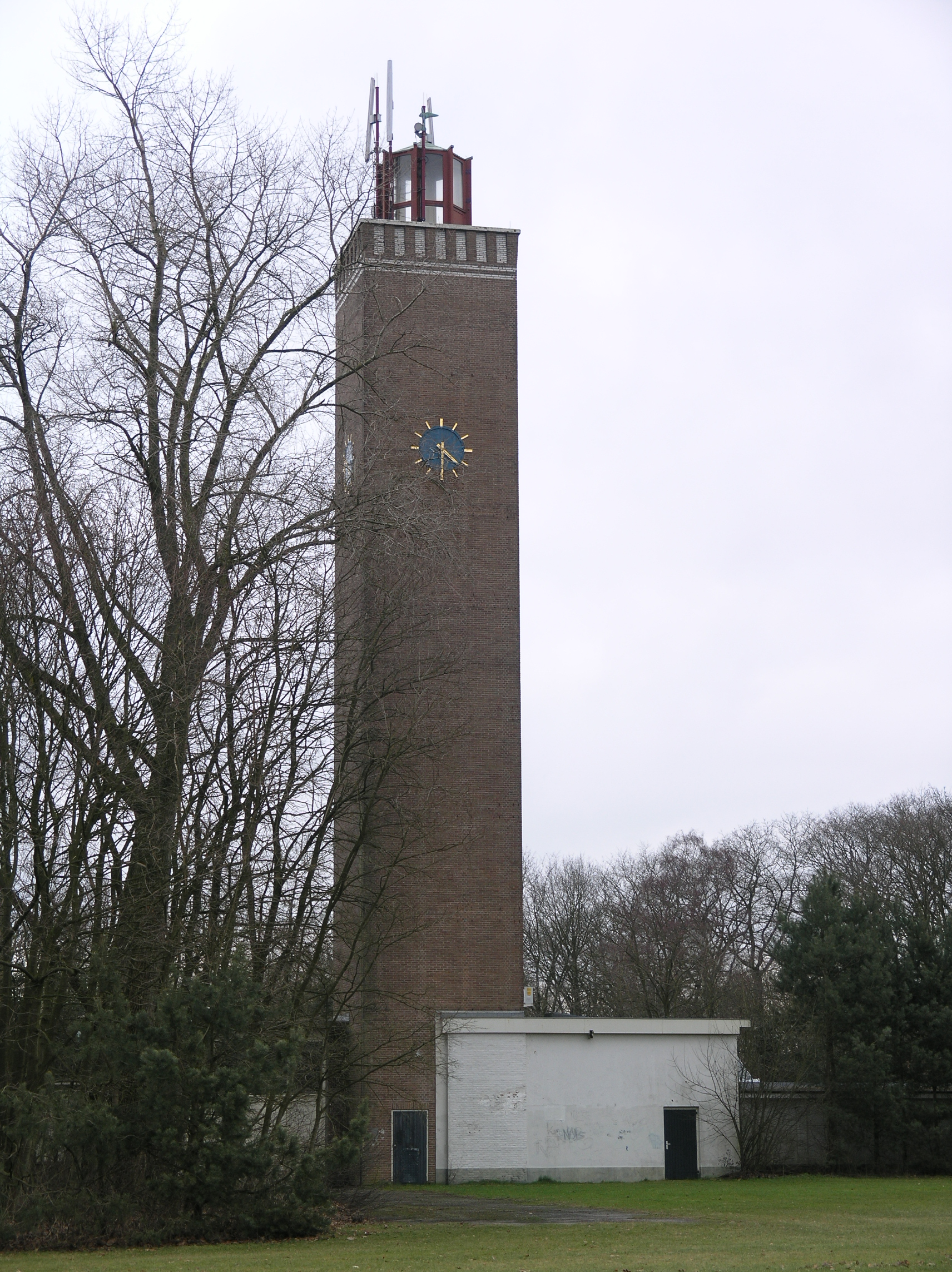
Watertower
