= Biesdonk =

Coordinates: 51°36′21″N 4°46′59″E

- Neighbourhood
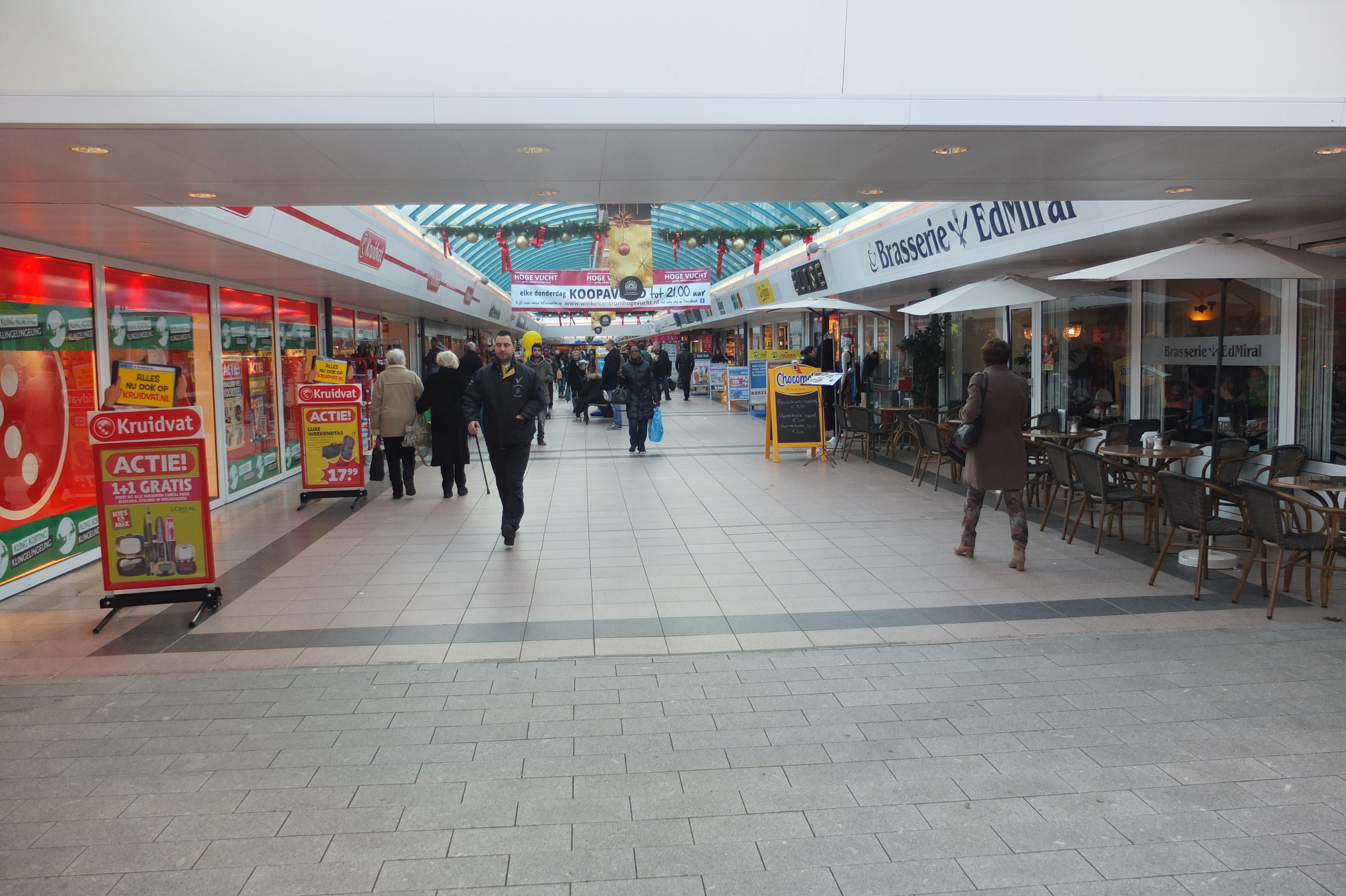
- Photo of Winkelcentrum Hoge Vucht in Biesdonk

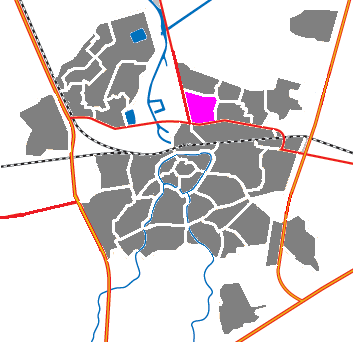
- Biesdonk within Breda (in pink)
- Country: Netherlands
- Province: North Brabant
- Municipality: Breda
- City: Breda

Area
  - Total: 0.79 km^{2} (0.31 sq mi)
  - Land: 0.79 km^{2} (0.31 sq mi)

Population (2025)
  - Total: 4,900
  - Density: 6,200/km^{2} (16,000/sq mi)
- Time zone: UTC+1 (CET)
  - Summer (DST): UTC+2 (CEST)
- Postal code: 4826
- Area code: 076

Biesdonk is a neighbourhood in the city Breda. Biesdonk has 4.900 residents (2025).

== Development ==
The Vuchtpolder, the area now known as the Hoge Vucht in Breda was part of municipality Teteringen between 1795 and 1961. Vuchtpolder got annexed in small bits in 1927, 1942 and 1961. Biesdonk was built in the 60s, the same with Wisselaar and other neighbourhoods in the Hoge Vucht. Biesdonk was specifically built between 1965 and 1967, the second neighbourhood of the Hoge Vucht. Biesdonk consists of low 2-story houses and some flats.

== Demographics ==
Seeing in this table below, most people in Biesdonk are young-aged adults (aged 25-45).

Age group	Amount in numbers	Percentage
0-15	745	15.2%
15-25	680	13.9%
25-45	1355	27.7%
45-65	1195	24.4%
65 or above	925	18.9%

70,6% of residents are local-born residents, 29,4% are foreign-born residents.

79,2% of foreign-born residents are born outside of Europe, 20,8% of foreign-born residents are born inside of Europe.

== Facilities ==
At the Biesdonkweg there are 3 schools; Bouwschool Breda, Newmancollege and a Curio school.

There is another Curio school at the Terheijdenseweg too. At the Terheijdenseweg there is also an Intratuin, a Dutch major plant store.

At the Moerwijk, there is a major shopping center called Winkelcentrum Hoge Vucht.

== Transportation ==
Bus 1 and bus 2 go through Biesdonk. Bus 2 goes from Kievitsloop in Haagse Beemden to Biesdonk and bus 1 goes from Biesdonk to Heusdenhout.
