= Teteringen =

- City district / Village
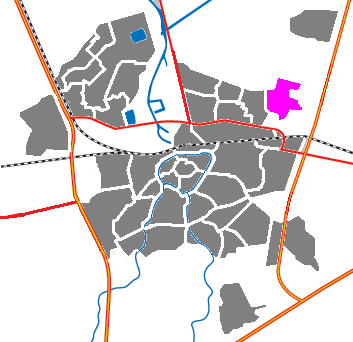
- Country: Netherlands
- Province: North Brabant
- Municipality: Breda

Area
  - Total: 11.44 km^{2} (4.42 sq mi)
  - Land: 11.27 km^{2} (4.35 sq mi)
  - Water: 0.17 km^{2} (0.066 sq mi)

Population (2025)
  - Total: 9,275
  - Density: 823.0/km^{2} (2,132/sq mi)
- Time zone: UTC+1 (Central European Time)
  - Summer (DST): UTC+2 (Central European Summer Time)
- Postal code: 4847
- Area code: 076

Teteringen is a city district / village in the northeast of Breda in the Dutch province of North Brabant. It is located in the municipality of Breda, about 4 km north of the city centre.

== History ==
Teteringen was first mentioned in 1274. Teteringen got transformed from a hamlet into a parish in 1635.

Teteringen became a municipality in 1795, which got absorbed in 1997 into Breda.

Teteringen was built around a chapel, burned down in 1624-1625, transformed into a parish church in 1635 and destroyed in 1809. In the place of the chapel, there is now a cemetery there.

On 29 October, 1944, Teteringen was freed from the Nazi occupation of the Netherlands.

== Demographics ==
As demonstrated in the table below, the biggest age group of Teteringen are middle-aged adults (aged 45-65).

Age distribution of Teteringen
Age group	Population	Percentage
0-15	1795	19.4%
15-25	960	10.4%
25-45	2050	22.1%
45-65	2410	26%
65+	2060	22.2%

93% of residents are born in the Netherlands, 7% are foreign-born residents.

60% of foreign-born residents are born outside of Europe, 40% are born inside of Europe.

== Facilities ==
There are 3 elementary schools in Teteringen; OBS De Springplank, De Wegwijzer and Nutsbasisschool Teteringen. There is also a middle school called Curio Scala, giving Vmbo and Mavo education.

Teteringen has 2 sport locations, a Golf and Hockeyclub and football club RKVV DIA.

Teteringen has a few locations in the theme of healthcare, a pharmacy, a GP, 2 dental clinics. The closest hospital is Amphia Ziekenhuis 5 km away.

== Transportation ==
Bus 370, 371 and 372 goes through Teteringen. Those lines connect Teteringen with Geertruidenberg, Breda, Tilburg and Oosterhout.
