= Spandau =

- Borough of Berlin
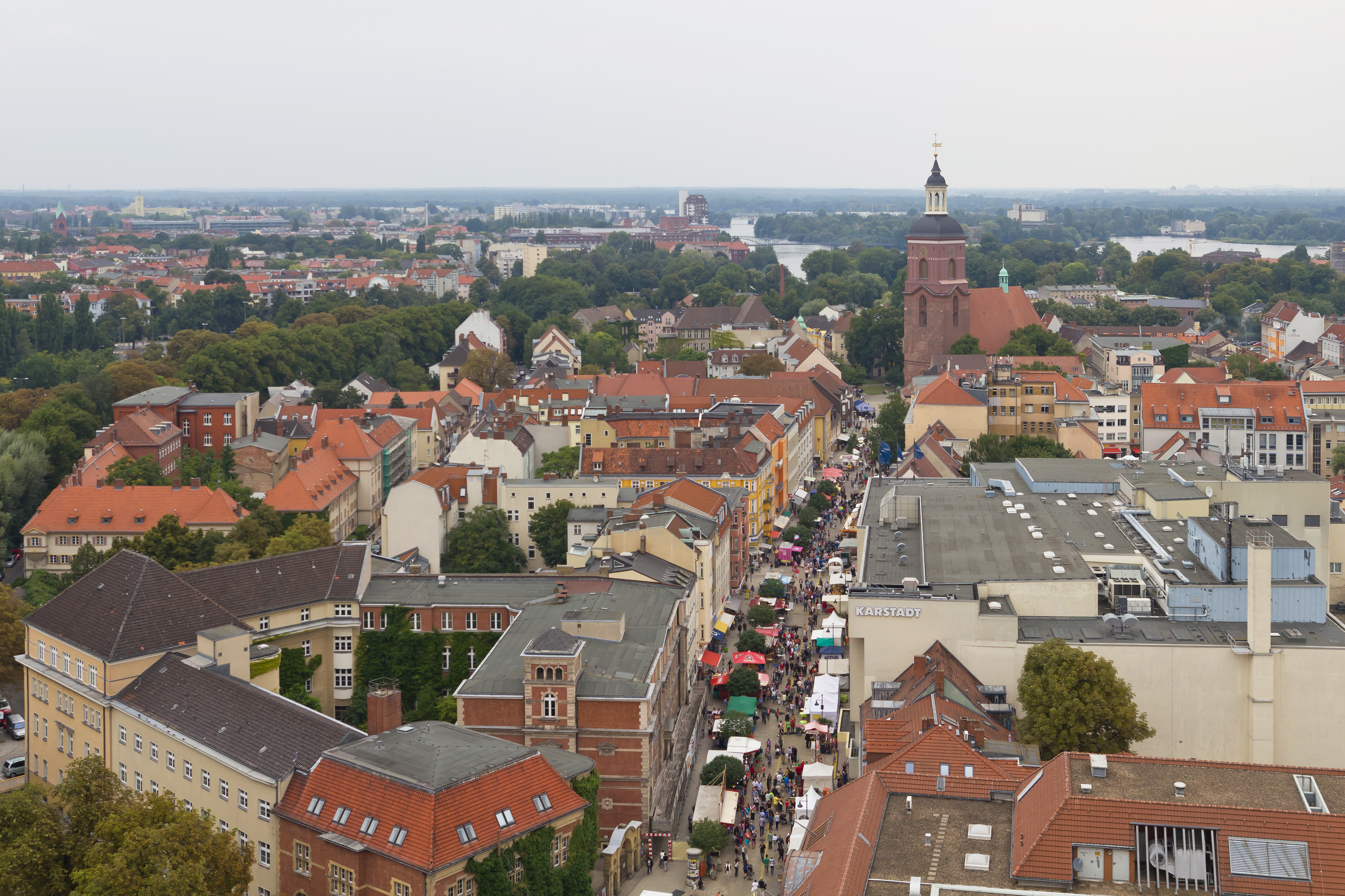
- Old town of Spandau

- Flag Coat of arms

- Location of Spandau in Berlin
- Interactive map of Spandau
- Location within Germany Location within Berlin
- Coordinates: 52°33′N 13°12′E
- Country: Germany
- State: Berlin
- City: Berlin
- Subdivisions: 9 localities

Government
  - Mayor: Frank Bewig (CDU)

Area
  - Total: 91.91 km^{2} (35.49 sq mi)

Population (2024-12-31)
  - Total: 246,257
  - Density: 2,679/km^{2} (6,939/sq mi)
- Time zone: UTC+01:00 (CET)
  - Summer (DST): UTC+02:00 (CEST)
- Vehicle registration: B
- Website: www.berlin.de/ba-spandau/

Spandau (German: [ˈʃpandaʊ]) is the westernmost of the 12 boroughs (Bezirke) of Berlin, situated at the confluence of the Havel and Spree rivers and extending along the western bank of the Havel. It is the smallest borough by population, but the fourth largest by land area.

== Overview ==
Modern industries in Spandau include metalworking, and chemical and electrical factories. BMW Motorrad's Spandau factory made all BMW's motorcycles from 1969 until final assembly plants were added in Rayong, Thailand, in 2000, and Manaus, Brazil, in 2016.

Rathaus Spandau, Spandau's seat of government, was built in 1913. Other landmarks include the Renaissance-era Spandau Citadel, the 1848 St. Marien am Behnitz Catholic church designed by August Soller, and Spandau arsenal. That arsenal's Spandau machine gun inspired the slang Spandau Ballet to describe dying soldiers on barbed wire during the First World War, and later was applied to the appearance of Nazi war criminals at Spandau Prison. In 1979, the English New Romantic band Spandau Ballet again re-purposed the term for its name.

== History ==
The history of Spandau begins in the 7th century or 8th century, when the Slav Heveller first settled in the area and later built a fortress there. It was conquered in 928 by the German King Henry I, but returned to Slavic rule after the rebellion of 983.

In 1156, the Ascanian Earl Albrecht von Ballenstedt ("Albrecht the Bear") took possession of the region. 1197 marked the first mention as Spandowe in a deed of Otto II, Margrave of Brandenburg – thus forty years earlier than the Cölln part of medieval Berlin. Spandau was given city rights in 1232.

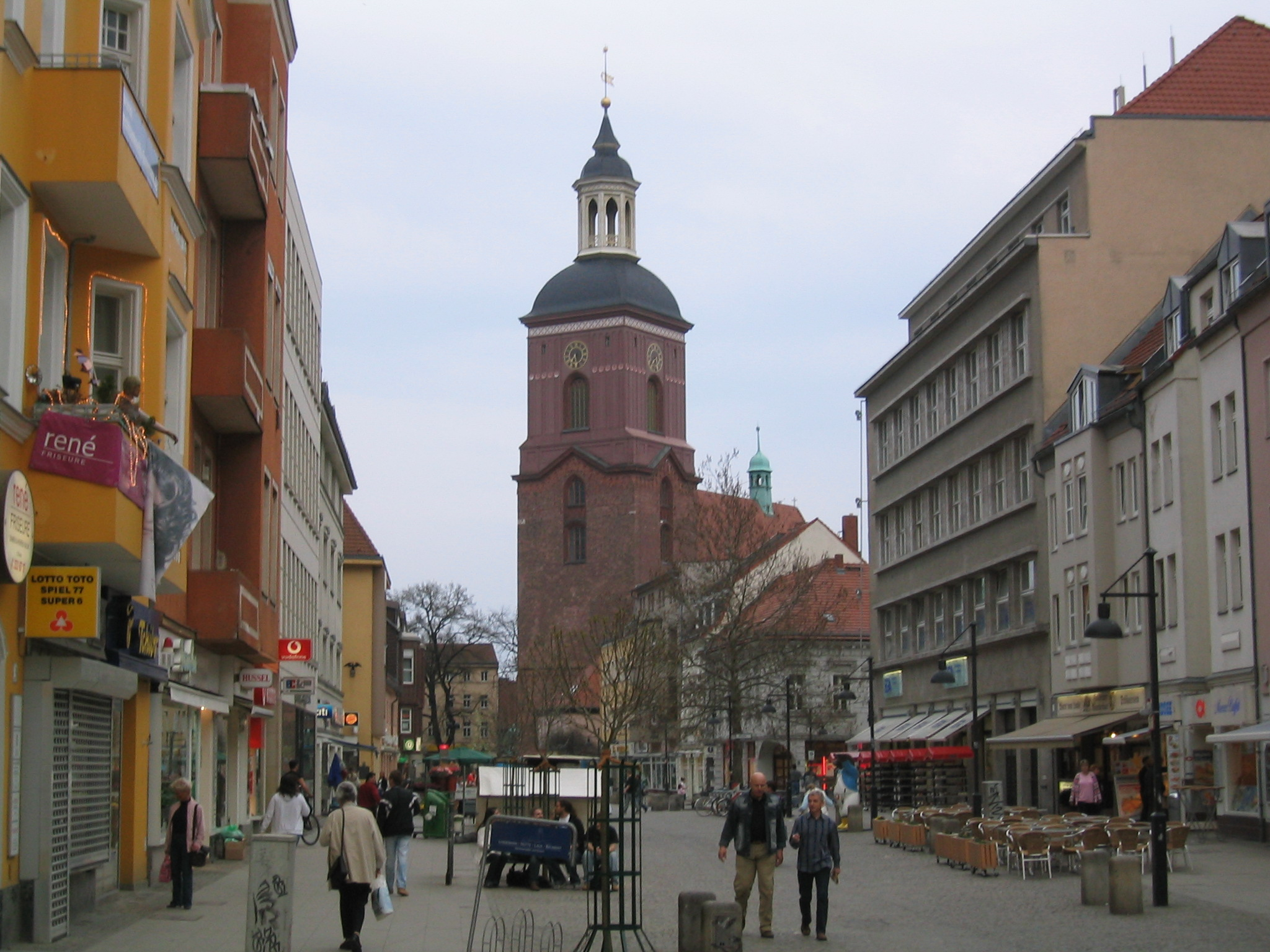
Old Town and Saint Nikolai Church

During Ascanian rule the construction of Spandau Citadel began, which was completed between 1559 and 1594 by Joachim II of Brandenburg. In 1558 the village of Gatow became part of Spandau. In 1634, during the Thirty Years' War, Spandau was surrendered to the Swedes. In 1689, a commune of French Huguenots and Waldensians was established.

In 1806, after the Battle of Jena and Auerstedt, French troops under Napoleon took possession of the city and stayed there until 1807. In 1812, Napoleon returned, and the Citadel was besieged the following year by Prussian and Russian troops.

From 1849 the poet and revolutionary Gottfried Kinkel was an inmate of Spandau town prison, until he was freed by his friend Carl Schurz in the night of 6 November 1850.

Before World War I, Spandau Arsenal was a seat of large government cannon foundries, factories for making gunpowder and other munitions of war, making it a centre of the arms industry in the German Empire. It was also a garrison town with numerous barracks, home of the 5th Guard Infantry Brigade and the 5th Guard Foot Regiment of the German Army. In 1920, Spandau (whose name had been changed from Spandow in 1878) was incorporated into Greater Berlin as a borough.

During World War II, Spandau was the location of a subcamp of the Sachsenhausen concentration camp, mainly for Polish and Hungarian women.

After World War II, it was part of the British sector of West Berlin. Spandau Prison, which had been rebuilt in 1876, was used to house Nazi war criminals given custodial sentences at the Nuremberg Trials. After the death of Spandau Prison's last inmate, Rudolf Hess, in 1987, it was completely demolished by the Allied powers and later replaced by a shopping mall.

Gatow airfield, in the south of the district, was used by the Royal Air Force during the post-war Allied occupation, most notably during the Berlin Airlift. Since 1995 the airfield has been the Gatow Museum of Military History.

== Geography ==
Outside Berlin, Spandau borders the districts (Kreis) of Oberhavel to the north, and Havelland to the west, and the city of Potsdam, Brandenburg, to the southwest. Within Berlin, it borders the boroughs of Steglitz-Zehlendorf to the south, Charlottenburg-Wilmersdorf to the east, and Reinickendorf to the northeast. Its land area of 91.91 km^{2} (35.49 sq mi) is the fourth-largest of the twelve boroughs.

=== Subdivisions ===
Subdivisions of Spandau

Spandau Borough is divided into nine quarters (Ortsteile):

- Spandau
- Haselhorst
- Siemensstadt
- Staaken
- Gatow
- Kladow
- Hakenfelde
- Falkenhagener Feld
- Wilhelmstadt

== Demographics ==
As of 2010, Spandau had a population of 223,962, the smallest of the twelve boroughs of Berlin. 62,000 of those were migrants or other non-ethnic Germans, comprising 27% of Spandau's population.

Percentage of people with migration background	
Germans without migration background/non-migrants	165,000 (73%)
Germans with migration background or foreign citizens	62,000 (27%)
Middle Eastern origin (Turkey, Arab League, Iran etc.)	20,400 (9%)
(non-German) EU-European migration background (esp. Poles, Romanians etc.)	13,600 (6%)
African background/Afro-Germans (Ghana, Nigeria, Cameroon etc.)	7,000 (3%)
Others (East Asians, Russians, Serbs etc.)	20,400 (9%)

== Politics ==
=== District council ===
The governing body of Spandau is the district council (Bezirksverordnetenversammlung). It has responsibility for passing laws and electing the city government, including the mayor. The most recent district council election was held on 26 September 2021, and the results were as follows:

Party	Lead candidate	Votes	%	+/−	Seats	+/−
Social Democratic Party (SPD)	Carola Brückner	31,250	27.7	▼5.5	17	▼3
Christian Democratic Union (CDU)	Frank Bewig	30,714	27.2	▲1.5	16	±0
Alliance 90/The Greens (Grüne)	Elmas Wieczorek-Hahn	13,460	11.9	▲4.3	7	▲3
Alternative for Germany (AfD)	Andreas Otti	11,516	10.2	▼5.8	6	▼3
Free Democratic Party (FDP)	Matthias Unger	8,464	7.5	▲1.1	4	▲1
The Left (LINKE)	Lars Leschewitz	6,104	5.4	▼0.2	3	±0
Tierschutzpartei	Aida Spiegeler Castañeda	5,063	4.5	New	2	New
Die PARTEI		2,235	2.0	▲0.4	0	±0
dieBasis		1,743	1.5	New	0	New
We are Berlin		1,222	1.1	New	0	New
Voter Initiative Social Spandau		677	0.6	▼0.8	0	±0
Ecological Democratic Party		296	0.3	New	0	New
Liberal Conservative Reformers		138	0.1	New	0	New
Valid votes		112,882	98.6			
Invalid votes		1,577	1.4			
Total		114,459	100.0		55	±0
Electorate/voter turnout		177,874	64.3	▲5.0		
Source: Elections Berlin

=== District government ===
The district mayor (Bezirksbürgermeister) is elected by the Bezirksverordnetenversammlung, and positions in the district government (Bezirksamt) are apportioned based on party strength. Carola Brückner of the SPD was elected mayor on 4 November 2021. Since the 2021 municipal elections, the composition of the district government is as follows:

Councillor	Party	Portfolio
Carola Brückner	SPD	District Mayor; Staff, Finance, Logistics and Economic Development
Frank Bewig	CDU	Deputy Mayor; Education, Culture and Sport
Thorsten Schatz	CDU	Construction, Planning and Environment
Gregor Kempert	SPD	Social Affairs and Civil Service
Oliver Gellert	GRÜNE	Youth and Health
Vacant	AfD	Public Order
Source: Berlin.de

== Sports ==
The Wasserfreunde Spandau 04 have traditionally been an immensely powerful water polo team. They have been the most successful ball sports team in Europe with 85 national and international titles. Hagen Stamm, longtime captain of the team, was German champion fourteen times in a row from 1979 to 1992, and winner of the German cup twelve times and won the European Cup in 1982, 1985, 1986 and 1989. He is currently the president of the association (as of 2020). The team's home games do not take place in the district, but in the Sportzentrum Schöneberg. For 2027, the team plans to move to the then newly constructed arena in Spandau.

In 1939, LSV Spandau won the title of the first German basketball championship, which was won by a clear 47:16 victory over Bad Kreuznach. After 1945, the association was dissolved.

== Notable people ==
- Bela B. (born 1962), musician
- Hans Berndt (1913–1988), football player
- Helmut Bonnet (1910–1944), athlete
- Käthe Heinemann (1891–1975), pianist
- Robert Hoyzer (born 1979), football referee
- Käthe Itter (1907–1992), actress
- Paul Kellner (1890–1972), swimmer
- Henning Alexander von Kleist (1707–1784), Governor of Spandau citadel, died there
- Rosa Lindemann (1876–1958), communist
- Arthur Löwenstamm (1882–1965), Spandau Synagogue's first and only rabbi from 1917 to 1938
- Moriz von Lyncker (1853–1932), Prussian officer and Chief of the Military Cabinet of Kaiser Wilhelm II
- Christian Friedrich Neue (1789–1886), philologist
- Oliver Petszokat (born 1978), better known by his stage name Oli.P, singer, actor and TV presenter
- Hans von Plessen (1841–1929), Prussian Colonel-General
- Ivan Rebroff (1931–2008), singer
- Erna Sack (1898–1972), coloratura soprano, known as the German Nightingale for her high vocal range.
- Sıla Şahin (born 1985), actress
- Richard Schulze-Kossens (1914–1988), SS commander during the Nazi era
- Elke Sommer (1940-)
- Franz Hermann Troschel (1810–1882), zoologist
- Carl Albert Weber (1856–1931), botanist
- Kai Wegner (born 1972), politician of the Christian Democratic Union of Germany (CDU)

== Twin towns – sister cities ==
Spandau is twinned with:

- Ashdod, Israel (1968)
- Asnières-sur-Seine, France (1959)
- İznik, Turkey (1987)
- (England) Luton, United Kingdom (1959)
- Nauen, Germany (1988)
- Siegen, Germany (1952)
- Siegen-Wittgenstein, Germany (1952)

== See also ==
- Berlin Spandau – Charlottenburg North (electoral district)
- Altstadt Spandau, the historic old town
- Spandau Synagogue
- Monuments in Spandau (German Wikipedia)
