= Richard Goldstein (astronomer) =

American radar astronomer (1927–2024)

Richard M. "Dick" Goldstein
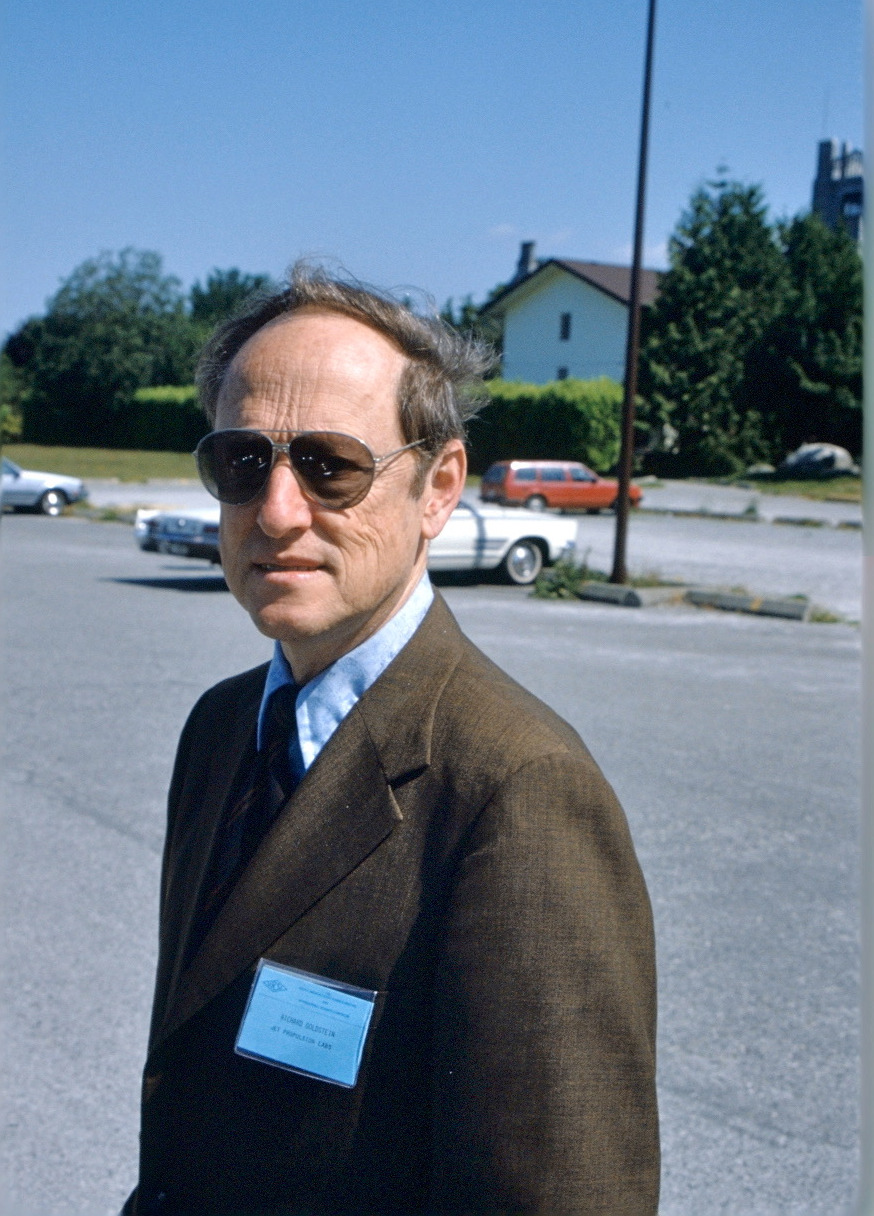
- Goldstein in 1985
- Born: April 11, 1927; Indianapolis, Indiana, U.S.
- Died: June 22, 2024 (aged 97); La Cañada Flintridge, California, U.S.
- Education: Purdue; Caltech
- Known for: Radar interferometry
- Scientific career
- Fields: Radar interferometry Radar astronomy
- Workplaces: Jet Propulsion Laboratory, California

Richard Morris Goldstein (April 11, 1927 – June 22, 2024) was an American radar astronomer and planetary scientist, who has been called "The Father of Radar Interferometry".

== Biography ==
Richard Goldstein was born in Indianapolis, Indiana, on April 11, 1927. He studied Electrical Engineering at Purdue. After working at his family furniture store for eleven years, he followed his brother (astronomer Samuel J. Goldstein, Jr.) to California and NASA's Jet Propulsion Laboratory.

As a graduate student at Caltech in 1961, Goldstein used the antenna at the Goldstone Tracking Station to obtain the first realtime radar echos from the planet Venus. By 1963, Goldstein and co-author had measured the period and retrograde rotation of Venus. Using his same techniques, he confirmed Soviet experiments that acquired radar echoes from Mercury and he was first to obtain echos from Mars in 1963. In 1968, Goldstein was the first to obtain a radar echo from an asteroid, when he measured the radar cross section of Icarus. Later he also measured the size and rotational period of the nucleus of a comet.

In 1964, Goldstein had analyzed the spectrum of radar echos from Venus to obtain the first images of features on the surface of that planet. Later, using range-Doppler and radar interferometric techniques, he was able to create some of the first maps of the planet. Goldstein was also first to get echos from Ganymede and later other moons of Jupiter. He also detected Saturn's rings using radar.

Goldstein began work in the mid-1980s on topographical mapping techniques using synthetic aperture radar. Initially using two antennas (and later a single antenna with a repeated track), he was able to use the phase interferometry to improve over stereoscopic optical mapping techniques. Goldstein then developed his revolutionary "crabgrass growing" algorithm for phase unwrapping, which resolves ambiguities in phase data and isolates local noise and errors that would otherwise cause global errors. This algorithm simplified the creation of accurate elevation maps, and made possible many new applications for radar interferometry, including satellite detection and quantification of small changes such as land subsidence, ice flow motion, ocean currents, and geological fault shifts. His subsequent work includes algorithms for mitigating thermal noise in the phase data, yielding dramatic improvements in the quality of measurement and phase data.

In the 1990s, Goldstein also worked on applying radar techniques for detecting orbital debris. Previous radar approaches were able to detect orbiting objects as small as 5mm. By using short wavelength pulses and a separate antenna to detect echos, Goldstein was able to improve the detection of objects to less than 2mm at a 600 km altitude. In the process, he discovered that the Earth has rings of debris (some apparently left over from the West Ford Project). He continued to refine the technique, extending the capabilities to detect 3mm objects as far away as 3200 km.

Goldstein was a regular participant and frequent award-winner in the annual JPL Invention Challenge.

== Personal life and death ==
Goldstein married Ruth Lowenstam, daughter of the paleoecologist Heinz A. Lowenstam and a great-niece of Spandau Synagogue's rabbi Arthur Lowenstamm. Their eldest child is the rabbi Lisa Goldstein.

Richard Goldstein died in La Cañada Flintridge, California on June 22, 2024, at the age of 97.

== Honors ==
Goldstein received the NASA Honors Award, Exceptional Engineering Achievement Medal in 2000.

Asteroid 5393 is named 5393 Goldstein.
