= Arthur Löwenstamm =

German-born British Jewish theologian, writer and rabbi

Rabbi Dr Arthur Löwenstamm
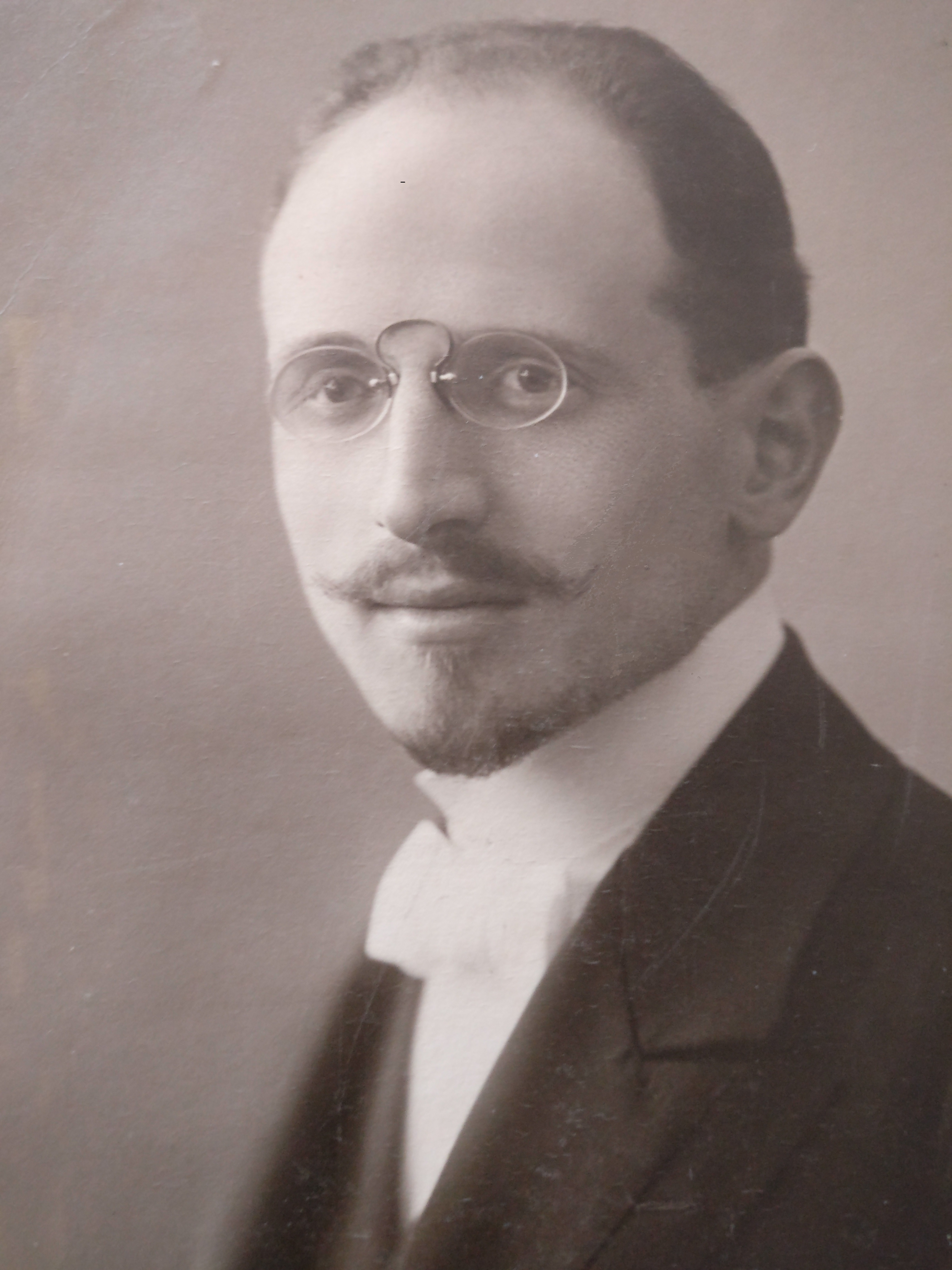
- Arthur Löwenstamm in 1911

Personal life
- Born: Arthur Löwenstamm; 20 December 1882 Ratibor, Upper Silesia, German Empire
- Died: 22 April 1965 (aged 82) Manchester, England
- Buried: Hoop Lane Jewish Cemetery in Golders Green, London
- Spouse: Gertrud Modlinger
- Children: Erika Reid and Gerda Weleminsky
- Parent(s): Natan Löwenstamm and Johanna Zweig
- Occupation: Theologian, writer and rabbi

Religious life
- Religion: Judaism
- Denomination: Reform Judaism

Jewish leader
- Position: Rabbi
- Synagogue: Spandau Synagogue
- Began: 1917
- Ended: 1938
- Other: Rabbi, Jewish community in Pless, Upper Silesia, 1911–17
- Residence: Pless and Spandau, Germany; Richmond, Surrey and Manchester, United Kingdom
- Semikhah: Jewish Theological Seminary of Breslau, 1910

Arthur Löwenstamm (also spelt Loewenstamm) (20 December 1882– 22 April 1965) was a Jewish theologian, writer and rabbi in Berlin and in London, where he came in 1939 as a refugee from Nazi Germany.

He was the last rabbi of the Jewish community of Spandau, Germany, which comprised 600 members in 1933.

== Early life and education ==
Arthur Löwenstamm was born on 20 December 1882 in Ratibor, Upper Silesia, German Empire, which is now Racibórz in southern Poland. His parents were Natan Löwenstamm (1856–1937), a shopkeeper, and his wife Johanna Zweig (1851–1936). He was the eldest in the family and had a brother, Kurt (1883–1965, whose son Heinz A. Lowenstam became a noted paleoecologist and great-granddaughter Lisa Goldstein also became a rabbi), a sister, Gertrud, and another brother, Ernest (1887–1888).

Löwenstamm attended the Royal Gymnasium in Beuthen (now Bytom), Upper Silesia, from 1893 to 1902. He studied philosophy at the University of Wrocław and completed his university studies, obtaining a doctorate, in Erlangen, Bavaria in 1905. He studied theology and trained for the rabbinate at the Jewish Theological Seminary of Breslau (now Wrocław in western Poland).

== Career ==
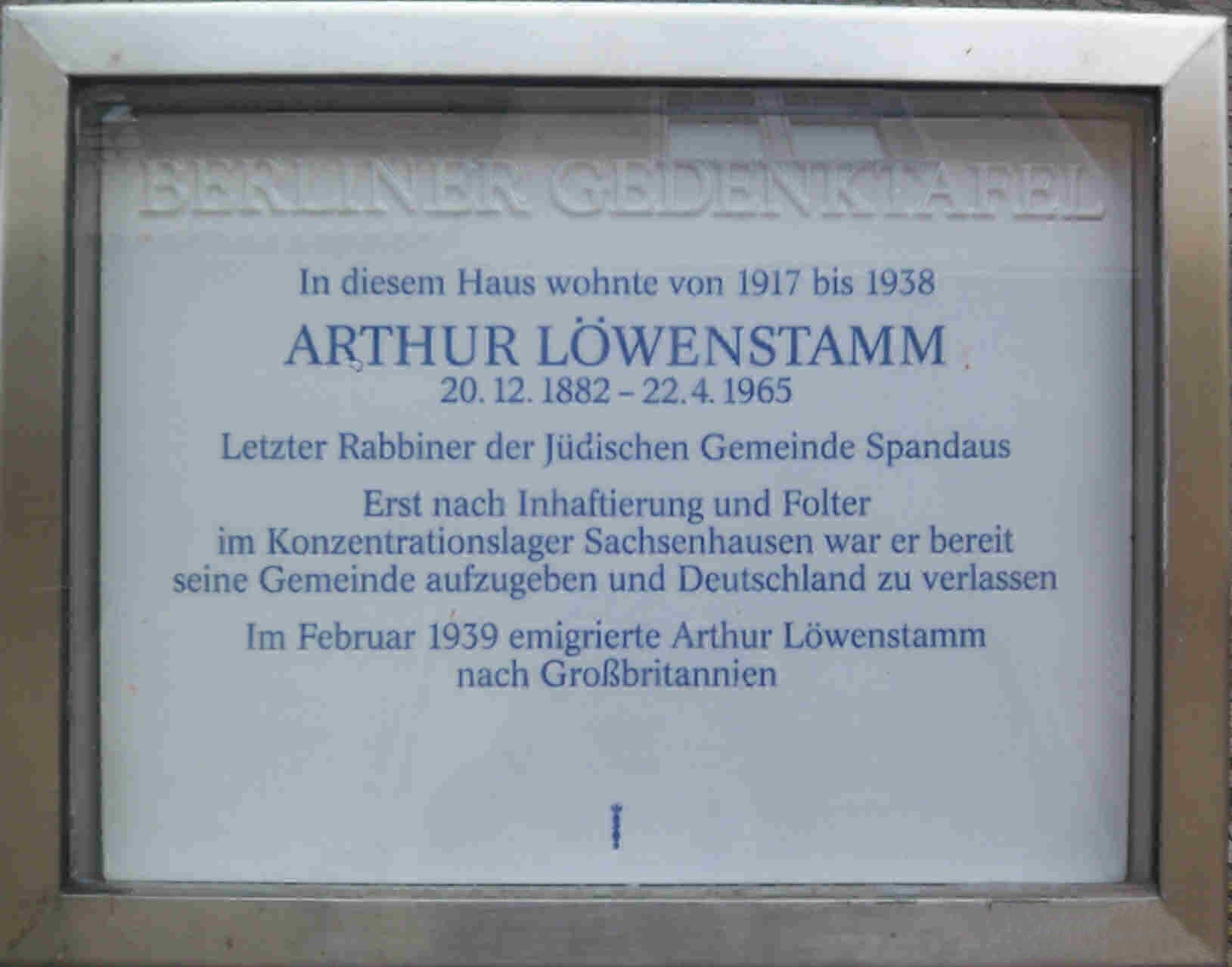
Memorial plaque in front of Löwenstamm's former home at Feldstraße 11 in Spandau; Geographic coordinates: '52°32′41″N 13°12′6″E

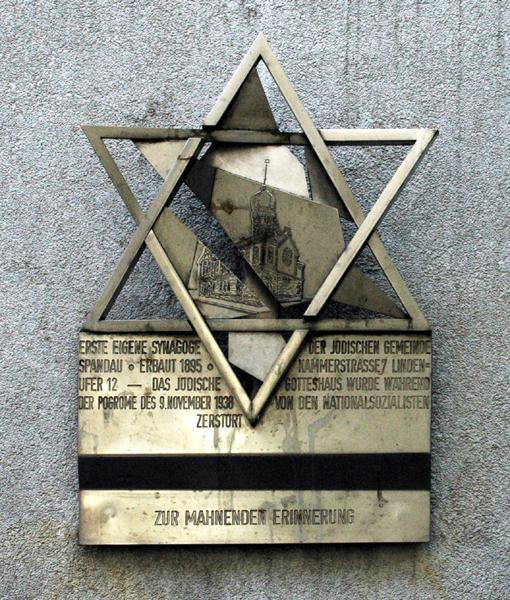
Plaque commemorating the synagogue at Spandau. The plaque, on the site of the former synagogue in Spandau's Old Town, was sculpted by Volkmar Haase

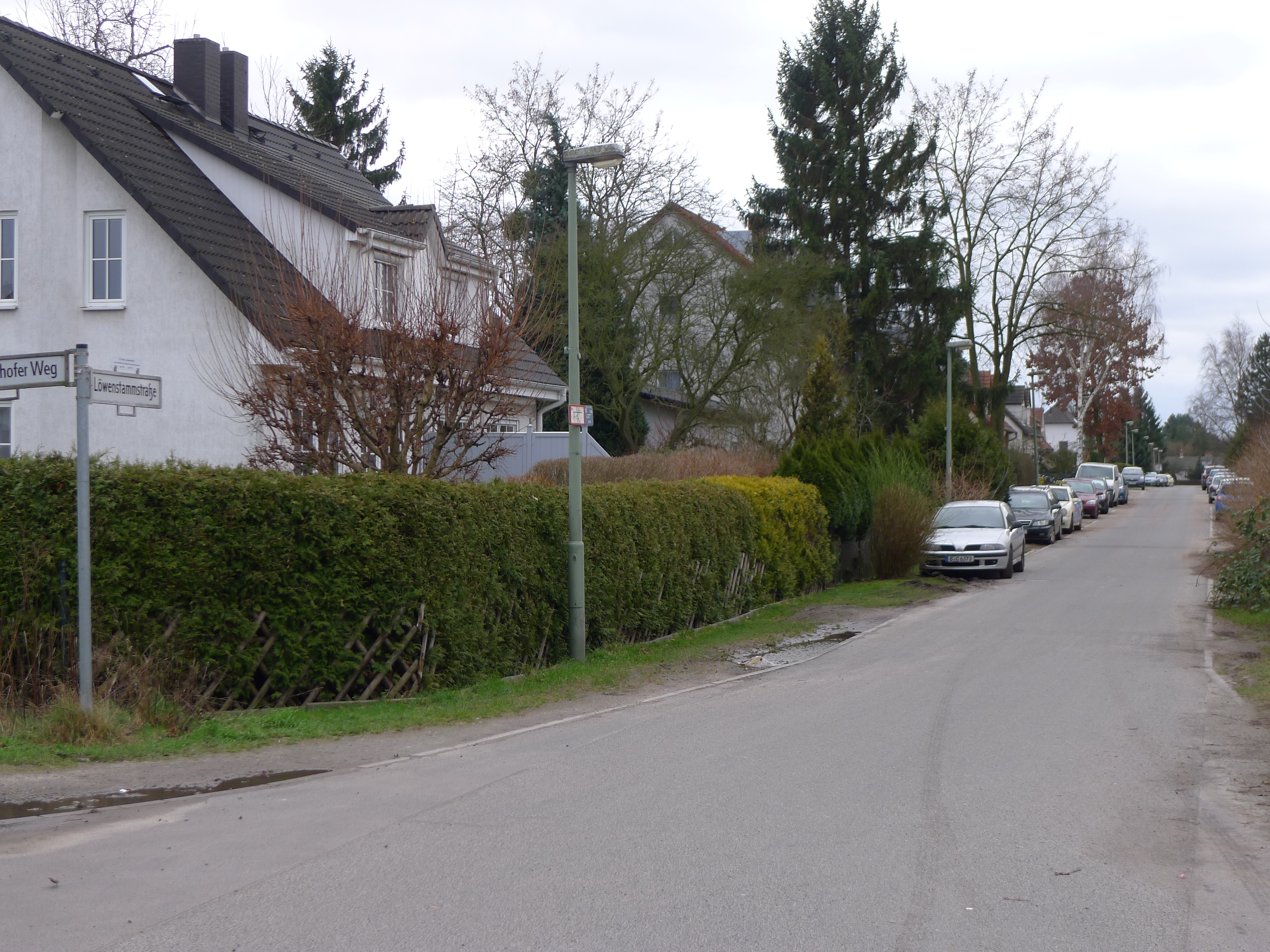
Löwenstammstraße, a street in Spandau that is named after him

After passing his rabbinical examinations in 1910, Löwenstamm served as rabbi (from 1911 to 1917) with the Jewish community in Pless (now Pszczyna) in Upper Silesia. On 6 December 1916 he was appointed as Spandau Synagogue's first permanent rabbi. Löwenstamm took up his duties on 1 April 1917 and continued until the autumn of 1938. In this role he also gave religious instruction at Spandau's Kant-Gymnasium. He was a member of the Union of Liberal Rabbis in Germany.

On 9 November 1938 (Kristallnacht) the synagogue, on Lindenufer in Spandau's Old Town, was set on fire. (Note: Frederic Zeller (1924–1994), who was then a Jewish teenager in Spandau, gives an eyewitness account of the burning of the synagogue in his memoir, in which (pp. 137–138, 142 and 155) he also recalls Rabbi Löwenstamm. Frederic Zeller (1989). When Time Ran Out: Coming of Age in the Third Reich. London: W H Allen. pp. 188–189. ISBN 978-0-491-03614-6.) Löwenstamm was tortured, imprisoned and deported to the Sachsenhausen concentration camp, from which he was eventually released. After his release from Sachsenhausen, he and his wife found refuge in the United Kingdom in February 1939 but he was interned for several weeks as an "enemy alien".

After the Second World War, Löwenstamm gave private lessons to several students, including Jakob Josef Petuchowski and Hugo Gryn. From May 1945, he was Research Director at the Society for Jewish Studies and a member of the Association of Rabbis from Germany to London.

== Personal life ==
In Breslau in 1911, he married Gertrud Modlinger (born 14 February 1887 in Gleiwitz; died 3 January 1952 in Richmond, Surrey, England), the daughter of Markus Modlinger and his wife Recha (née Freund). They had two daughters, Erika who moved to London in 1936 and Gerda who emigrated to Britain in 1938. Their grandchildren and great-grandchildren live in Britain and in Israel.

== Death and legacy ==
He died at Morris Feinmann House, Didsbury, Manchester, England on 22 April 1965 and was buried at Hoop Lane Jewish Cemetery in Golders Green, London. His archives were donated to the Leo Baeck Institute New York and to the Wiener Holocaust Library in London.

At the initiative of the Spandau Borough Council, a memorial tablet was unveiled in 1988 on the site of the former synagogue. A memorial plaque was placed on the pavement in front of Löwenstamm's former home at Feldstraße 11, in Spandau, on 9 November 2005.

On 15 August 2002 a street in Spandau was named Löwenstammstraße ("Löwenstamm Street").

== Publications ==
Löwenstamm was a Biblical scholar, specialising in Samaritan and Karaite literature. He wrote commentaries on Dutch philosopher and jurist Hugo Grotius and the German philosopher Hermann Lotze:

- Lotzes Lehre vom Ding an Sich und Ich an sich. Breslau: H. Fleischmann Verlag. 1906. ISBN 978-1-147-34747-0. Republished in Charleston, South Carolina by Nabu Press. 2010; paperback, 60 pages.
- "Hugo Grotius' Stellung zum Judentum (Hugo Grotius's attitude toward Judaism)" in Festschrift zum 75-jährigen Bestehen des jüdisch-theologischen Seminars Fraenkelscher Stiftung, Vol. II. Breslau: Verlag M. & H. Marcus, 1929; pp. 295–302. ASIN B005HKEZA4
- "Jüdischer Lebinsstil", Gemeindeblatt für die jüdischen Gemeinden Preussens: Verwaltungsblatt der Preussischen Landesverbandes jüdischer Gemeinden, 1 November 1934 (cited on p. 229 in Rebecca Rovit: The Jewish Kulturbund Theatre Company in Nazi Berlin). Iowa City: University of Iowa Press, 2012. ISBN 978-1-60938-124-0
- "The Society for Jewish Studies" in Festschrift zum 80. Geburtstag von Rabbiner Dr. Leo Baeck am 23. Mai 1953, London: Council for the Protection of the Rights and Interests of the Jews from Germany, 1953; pp. 98–106.

He also co-wrote a history commemorating 50 years of B'nai B'rith in Germany:

- Alfred Goldschmidt, Arthur Löwenstamm and Paul Rosenfeld: Zum 50 jährigen bestehen des Ordens Bne Briss in Deutschland: UOBB. Frankfurt am Main: Kauffmann, 1933, 203 pages. OCLC 2976130

== See also ==
- Movement for Reform Judaism

== Sources ==
- Astrid Zajdband (18 May 2015). German Rabbis in British Exile and their influence on Judaism in Britain (PDF) (Doctor of Philosophy thesis). Brighton, East Sussex: University of Sussex.
