= Lisa Goldstein (rabbi) =

American Reform rabbi

Personal life
- Born: October 9, 1965 (age 60) Pasadena, California, U.S.
- Parent: Richard Goldstein (father)
- Education: Brown University; Hebrew Union College-Jewish Institute of Religion
- Relatives: Heinz A. Lowenstam (grandfather)

Religious life
- Religion: Judaism
- Denomination: Reform

Lisa Laura Goldstein (born 9 October 1965) is an American Reform rabbi and, from 2011 to 2019, was the executive director of the Institute for Jewish Spirituality, an organization based in New York City. She was previously Executive Director of Hillel of San Diego.

== Biography ==
Goldstein was born on 9 October 1965 in Pasadena, California. She was the first of three children of celebrated astronomer Richard Goldstein and Ruth Goldstein and was raised in California. Her mother, Ruth, is the daughter of the celebrated paleoecologist Heinz A. Lowenstam and a great-niece of Spandau Synagogue's rabbi Arthur Lowenstamm.

Goldstein studied history at Brown University in Providence, Rhode Island, and subsequently trained for the rabbinate at Hebrew Union College-Jewish Institute of Religion (in New York and Los Angeles) where she also received a master's degree in Jewish education. From 1991 to 1993 she was assistant rabbi at Congregation Shaare Emeth, a Reform synagogue in Creve Coeur, Missouri. In 2000 Hillel International recognised her as being an Exemplar of Excellence.

Since June 2020, Rabbi Goldstein is offering online courses on meditation, resilience and Jewish mysticism.

She lives in New York City with her husband, Rabbi Igal Harmelin.

== See also ==
- Jewish meditation
- Spirituality
