= Richard Goldstein =

Richard Goldstein may refer to:

- Richard Goldstein (astronomer) (1927–2024), American astronomer and planetary scientist
- Richard Goldstein (writer, born 1942), former editor and writer for The New York Times who has written books on sporting and historical topics
- Richard Goldstein (writer, born 1944), former writer for the Village Voice who has written books on music, gay and lesbian issues, and counterculture
