= Spandau (locality) =

- Quarter of Berlin
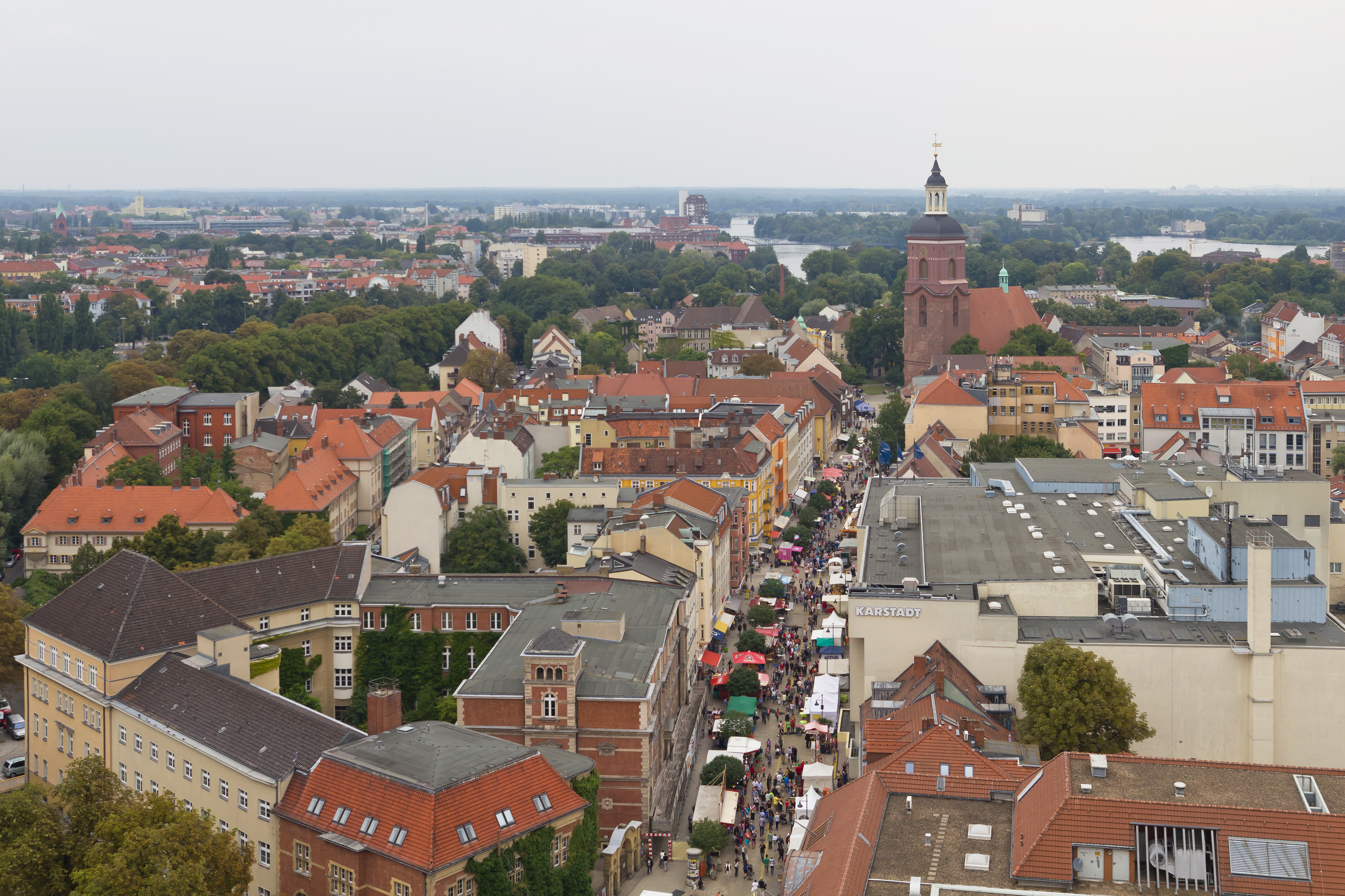
- Old Town (Altstadt Spandau)

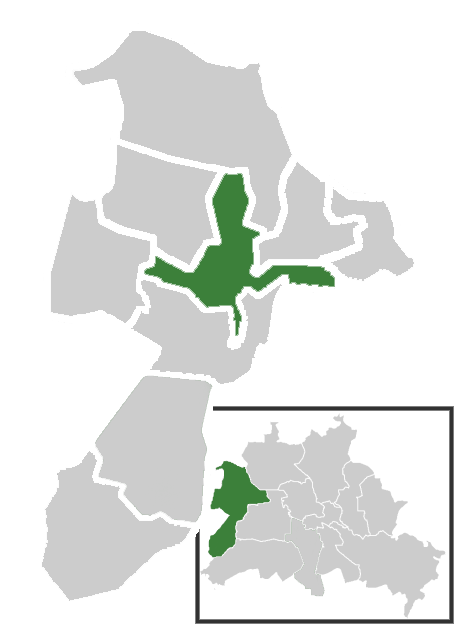
- Location of Spandau in Spandau district and Berlin
- Interactive map of Spandau
- Location within Germany Location within Berlin
- Coordinates: 52°32′10″N 13°12′12″E
- Country: Germany
- State: Berlin
- City: Berlin
- Borough: Spandau
- Subdivisions: 4 zones

Area
  - Total: 8.03 km^{2} (3.10 sq mi)
- Elevation: 35 m (115 ft)

Population (2024-12-31)
  - Total: 42,353
  - Density: 5,270/km^{2} (13,700/sq mi)
- Time zone: UTC+01:00 (CET)
  - Summer (DST): UTC+02:00 (CEST)
- Postal codes: 13403, 13407, 13409
- Vehicle registration: B

Spandau (German: [ˈʃpandaʊ]) is a locality (Ortsteil) of Berlin, Germany's capital and largest city, in the homonymous borough (Bezirk) of Spandau. The historic city is situated, for the most part, on the western banks of the river Havel. As of 2020, the estimated population of Spandau was 39,653.

== Geography ==
=== Position ===
The locality is situated in the middle of its borough. It borders Wilhelmstadt in the south, Staaken and Falkenhagener Feld in the west, Hakenfelde in the north as well as Haselhorst, Siemensstadt and Westend (in Charlottenburg-Wilmersdorf district) in the east.

=== Subdivision ===
Spandau proper is subdivided into four historic neighbourhoods (Ortslagen):

1. Altstadt Spandau (Old Town)
2. Neustadt Spandau (New Town, the northern expansion)
3. Stresow (east of the Havel)
4. Kolk-Spandau

== History ==
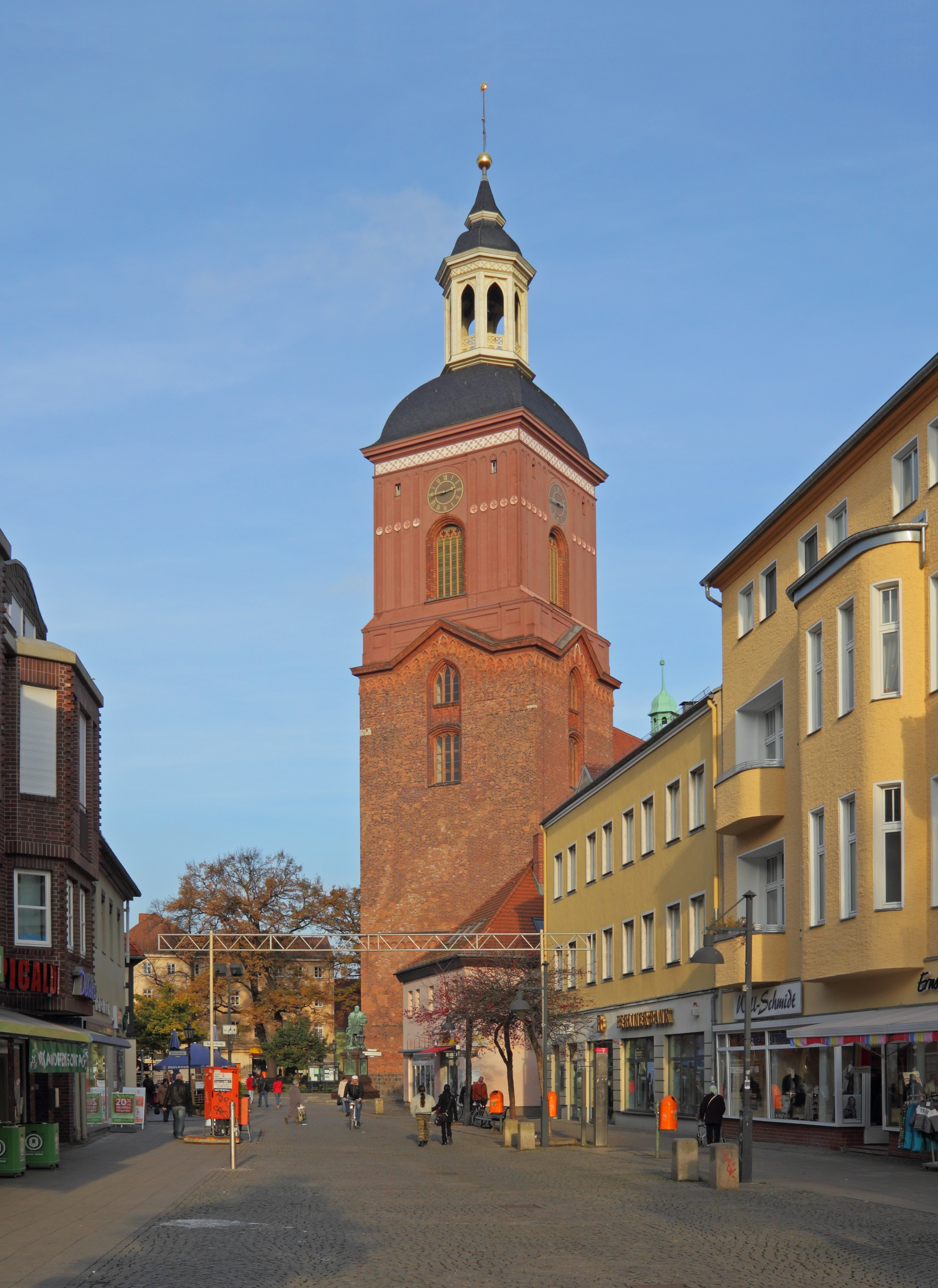
Old Town and Saint Nikolai Church

The city was founded at the confluence of the rivers Spree and Havel. The settlement of the area can be traced back to the 6th century when the eastern territories of the Elbe river were populated by several Slavic tribes. The history of Spandau begins in the 7th or 8th century, when the Slav Hevelli settled in the area and later built a fortress there. It was conquered in 928 by the German King Henry I, but returned to Slavic rule after the rebellion of 983. In 1156, the Ascanian count Albert the Bear took possession of the region and is believed to have established a fortress here, from which the name Spandau originated. It was around this fortress that the city of Spandow developed, becoming the centre of the entire region.

It was first mentioned as Spandowe in 1197 in a deed of Otto II, Margrave of Brandenburg – 40 years earlier than the Cölln part of medieval Berlin. Spandau was given city rights in 1232.

During Ascanian rule the construction of the Spandau Citadel began, which was completed between 1559 and 1594 by Joachim II of Brandenburg. In 1558 the village of Gatow became part of Spandau. During the Thirty Years' War Spandau was surrendered to the Swedes in 1634.

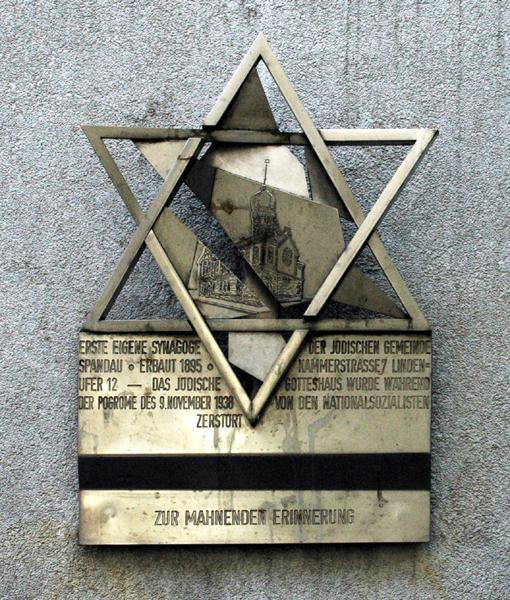
Plaque commemorating the synagogue at Spandau, which was built in 1895 and destroyed on Kristallnacht in 1938. The plaque, on Lindenufer and the corner of Chamber Street (the site of the former synagogue in Altstadt Spandau), was sculpted by Volkmar Haase.

In 1806, after the Battle of Jena and Auerstedt, French troops under Napoleon took possession of the city and stayed there until 1807. In 1812, Napoleon returned and the Spandau Citadel was besieged in 1813 by Prussian and Russian troops.

The poet and revolutionary Gottfried Kinkel was an inmate of the Spandau town prison from 1849, until he was freed by his friend Carl Schurz on the night of 6 November 1850.

Before World War I, Spandau was a seat of large, government, cannon foundries, factories for making gunpowder, and other munitions of war, making it a centre of the arms industry in the German Empire. It was also a garrison town with numerous barracks, home of the 5th Guards Infantry Brigade and the 5th Foot Guards of the German Army. In 1920, the independent city of Spandau (whose name had been changed from Spandow in 1878) was incorporated into Greater Berlin as a borough.

During World War II, Spandau was the location of a subcamp of the Sachsenhausen concentration camp, mostly for Polish and Hungarian women.

After World War II until 1990, when Berlin was divided into four sections administered by the victorious Allies, Spandau was part of the British Occupation Sector in West Berlin. The Spandau Prison, built in 1876, was used to house Nazi war criminals who were sentenced to imprisonment at the Nuremberg Trials. After the death of its last inmate, Rudolf Hess in 1987, Spandau Prison was completely demolished by the Allied powers and later replaced by a shopping mall.

== Places of interest ==
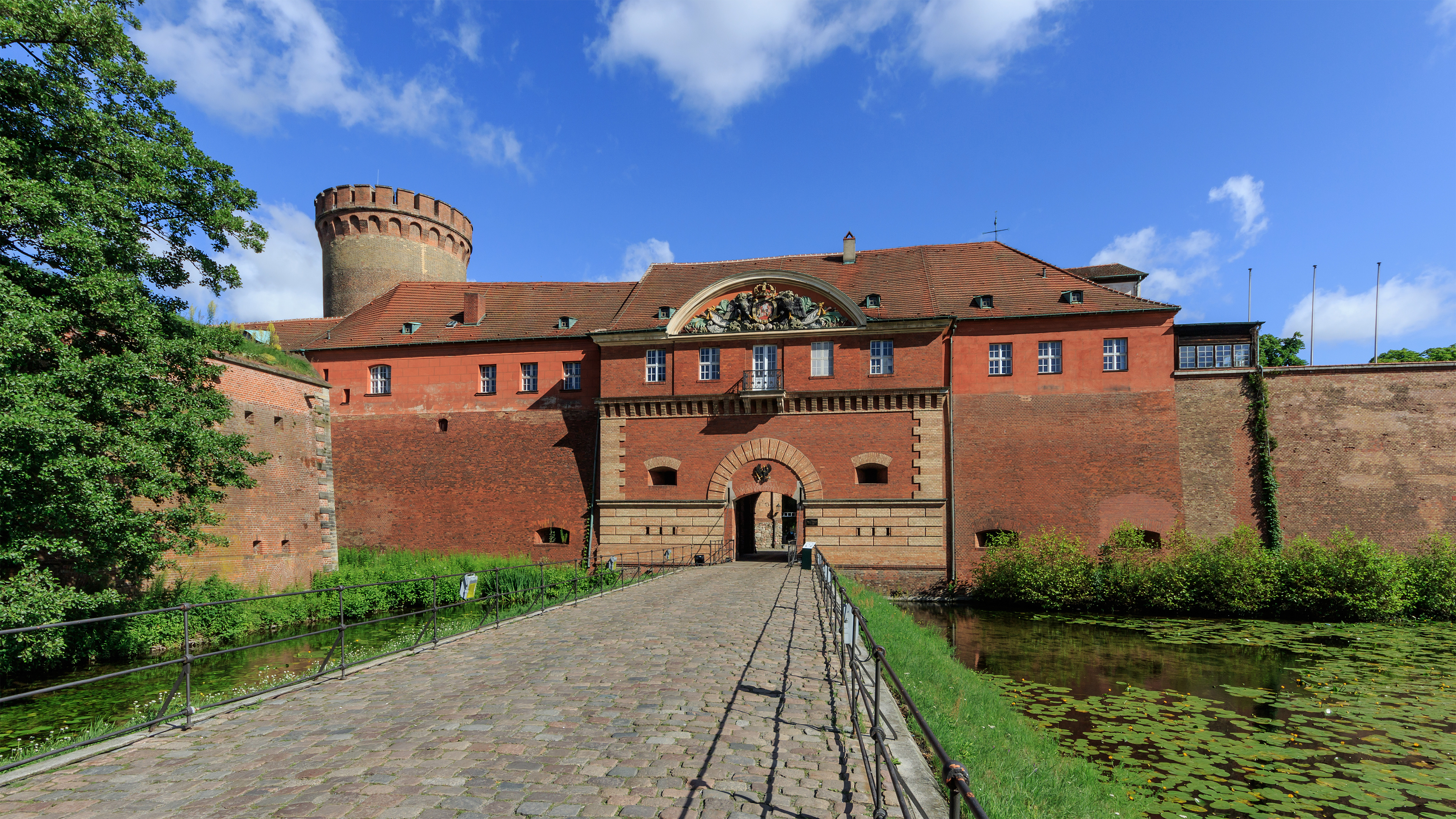
Citadel

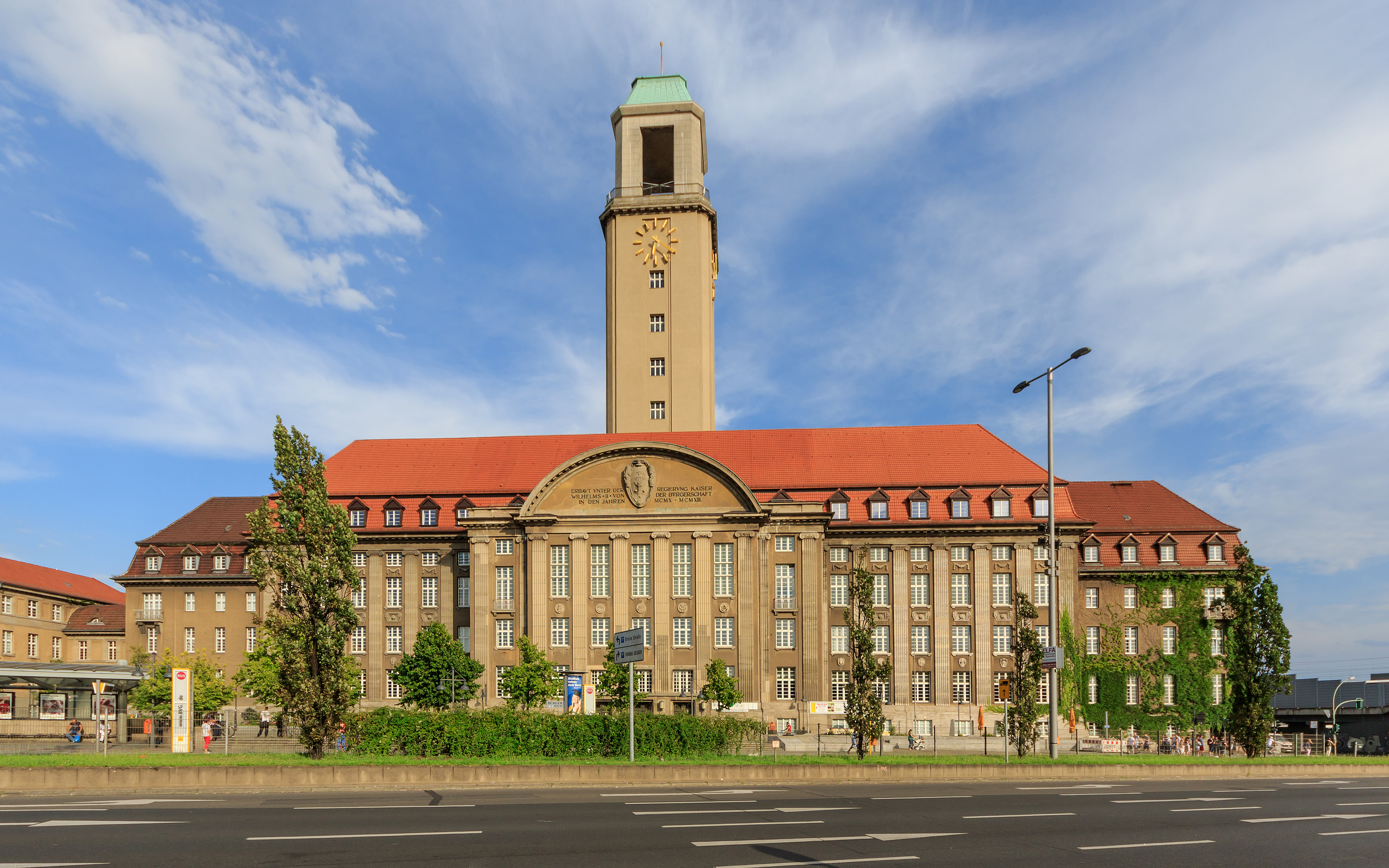
Town hall

- Spandau Citadel, a Renaissance fortress built in the 16th century (officially located in Haselhorst)
- St. Nikolai, a late Gothic hall church of the 14th century, where Elector Joachim II Hector on 1 November 1539 attended a Lutheran service for the first time. This date is commonly regarded as the beginning of the Protestant Reformation in the Margraviate of Brandenburg. The Baroque spire was attached in 1744 and refurbished by Karl Friedrich Schinkel in 1839. (There is also a Nikolaikirche in Berlin-Mitte.)
- Spandau Old Town with medieval Gotisches Haus ("Gothic House") of the 15th century
- Rathaus Spandau, the town hall, completed in 1913.

== Transportation ==
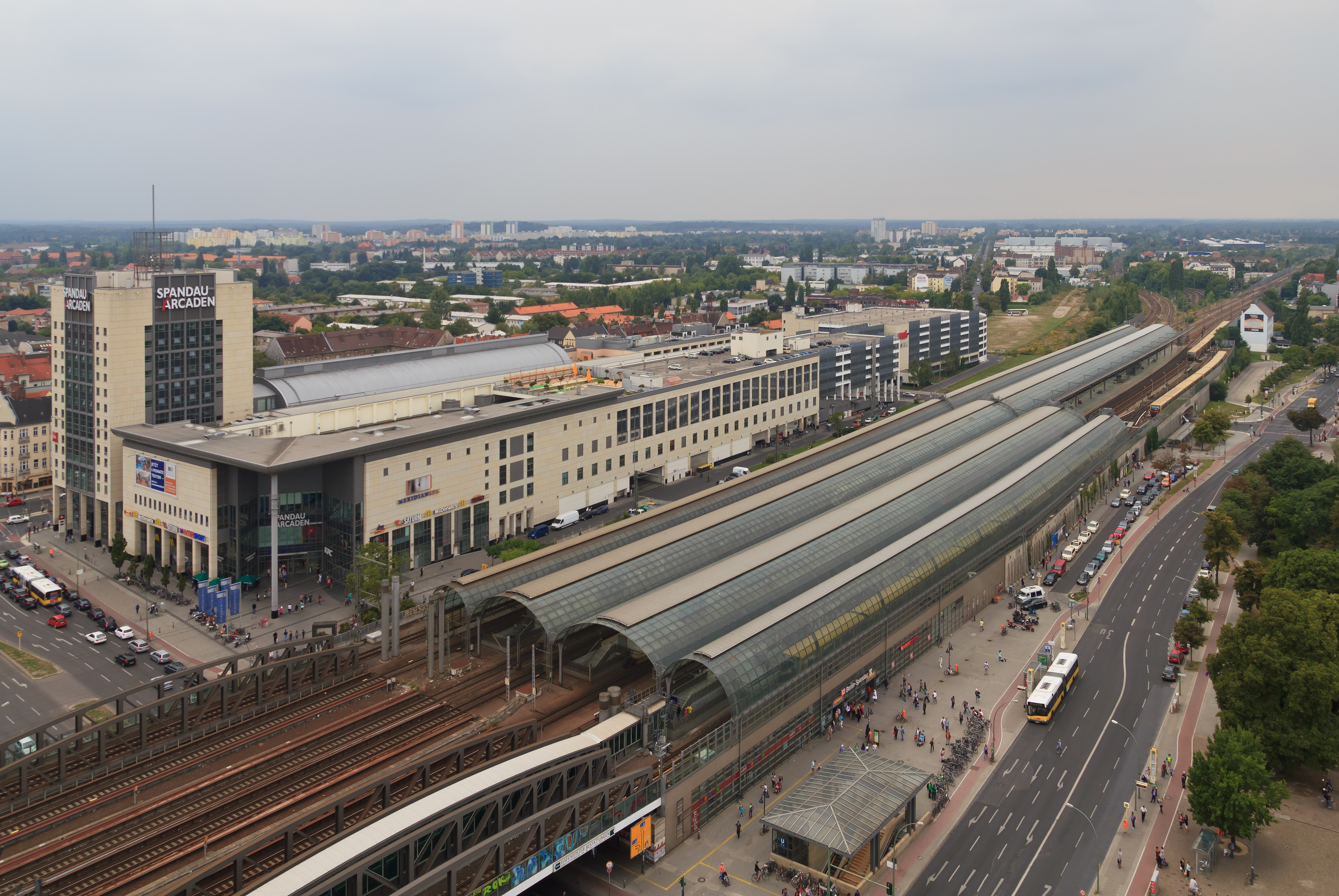
Railway station

Spandau is served by the Berliner S-Bahn lines S3 and S9 and by the U-Bahn line U7. The main railway station is Berlin Spandau, one of the most important of the city.

== See also ==
- Berlin-Spandau railway station
