= Hans Weisbach =

German conductor and pianist (1885–1961)

Hans Edgar Weisbach (19 July 1885 – 23 April 1961) was a German conductor and pianist.

== Life ==
Born in Głogów, Silesia, Weisbach came from a family of soldiers. Already from the age of seven he received piano as well as violin lessons and appeared as a pupil in various chamber music concerts. After his Abitur he studied violin at the Academic Academy of Music in Berlin, first with Joseph Joachim and Andreas Moser, then piano with Ernst Rudorff and Georg von Petersenn and finally conducting with Robert Hausmann. In addition, he took courses in philosophy and musicology.

In 1908 Weisbach moved to Munich, where he worked as a trainee Kapellmeister at the court theatre there, now the Bavarian State Opera under Felix Mottl, and at the same time attended further lectures at the Ludwig-Maximilians-Universität München. Three years later, he moved to Frankfurt, where he worked as a pianist and chamber musician at his own concert events and for the Frankfurter Museumsgesellschaft and was the second conductor of the "Rühlsche Oratorienverein". After a short episode in Worms, where he took over the direction of the Konzertgesellschaft in 1913, and in Wiesbaden as well as a break due to the war, he was elected municipal music director of the Philharmonisches Orchester in Hagen/Westphalia in 1919, where he conducted the world premiere of Paul Graener's Concerto for Piano and Orchestra (op. 72) with Käthe Heinemann as soloist in 1926. In Hagen, Weisbach was instrumental in the completion of the half-finished and damaged Stadthalle and of the first Hagen Music Festival in 1923. In addition to these activities, he directed the Barmen concert company from 1924.

Finally in 1926, after several successful performances as a guest conductor, he was appointed to succeed Georg Schnéevoigt as municipal general music director in Düsseldorf. His first major appearance with the Düsseldorfer Symphoniker and a demanding programme at the opening ceremony of the Great "Ausstellung für Gesundheitspflege, soziale Fürsorge und Leibesübungen" (Exhibition for Health Care, Social Welfare and Physical Exercise) (GeSoLei) was a highly acclaimed success. In the following years he conducted the Lower Rhenish Music Festival as well as numerous premieres and first performances such as the Missa Symphonica for mixed choir, solos, orchestra and organ op. 36 and the Requiem by Lothar Windsperger, the Marianische Antiphon for solos, choir, organ and orchestra by Wolfgang Fortner and Die Weihe der Nacht by himself as premieres as well as Le Roi David by Arthur Honegger, the Stabat mater op. 53 by Karol Szymanowski and Hymnus by Heinz Schubert.

With a last concert on 8/9 February 1933, Weisbach ended his activities in Düsseldorf and moved to Leipzig, where he took over the direction of the Leipzig Radio Symphony Orchestra, now the MDR Leipzig Radio Symphony Orchestra, until 1939. He then moved to Vienna during the war years. Here Weisbach conducted the Vienna Symphony until 1944, an orchestra in which there had been a disproportionately large number of party members and candidates for party membership since the Nazi seizure of power. Among other things, he was responsible for the so-called Kraft durch Freude concerts, for appearances on Reichsrundfunk and for the performance of the major Vienna concert series, before the orchestra - already considerably reduced in personnel due to conscripts for military service - was closed down in August 1944.

After he had undergone denazification proceedings - he had been a member of the NSDAP since 1937 - he was finally appointed municipal music director in Wuppertal in 1947, where his career ended.

Throughout his life, Weisbach was considered an internationally renowned connoisseur and interpreter of the music of Johann Sebastian Bach, which he performed many times (among others with the London Symphony Orchestra). In recognition of his life's work and for his years of musical development in Hagen and Wuppertal, Hans Weisbach was awarded the von der Heydt-Culture-Prize and the Great Cross of Merit in 1955.

Weisbach died in Wuppertal at the age of 75.
