= Jakob Josef Petuchowski =

German-American rabbi and scholar of Jewish studies

Jakob Josef Petuchowski (1925 – 1991) was an American research professor of Jewish Theology and Liturgy and the Sol and Arlene Bronstein Professor of Judeo-Christian Studies at the Hebrew Union College-Jewish Institute of Religion, Cincinnati, Ohio. He was born on July 25, 1925 in Berlin and died November 12, 1991, in Cincinnati.

== Education ==
Petuchowski was brought up as an Orthodox Jew in Berlin and left Germany in May 1939 for Scotland on the Kindertransport. His father, Samuel Meir Sigmund Petuchowski, died in 1928 and his mother was murdered in the Holocaust.

Aged just 16, and having had only a year's instruction in English before leaving Berlin, he became a rabbinical student at the Glasgow Rabbinical College. While studying for a Bachelor of Arts (Honours) degree in psychology, which he received from the University of London in 1947, he continued Jewish studies privately, receiving tuition from Rabbis Leo Baeck and Arthur Löwenstamm among others. In 1948 he became a rabbinical student at Hebrew Union College, Cincinnati. He received a master's degree in 1952 and a PhD in 1956.

== Professional career ==
He served as part-time rabbi in Welch, West Virginia, between 1949 and 1955 and was full-time rabbi in Washington, Pennsylvania, from 1955 to 1956. He returned to teach at Hebrew Union College in 1956. During the academic year 1963-64 he was rabbi and founding director of Judaic Studies at the college's newly established branch in Jerusalem.

== Personal life ==
He married Elizabeth Mayer from Bochum on November 28, 1946, and they had three sons: Samuel, Aaron and Jonathan.

== Publications ==
His works include Ever Since Sinai (1961), Zion Reconsidered (1966), Prayerbook Reform in Europe (1968), Understanding Jewish Prayer (1972), Theology and Poetry (1978), Es lehrten unsere Meister (1979) and When Jews and Christians Meet (1986). His story as a child leaving his mother and home town Berlin on the Kindertransport can be found in the book I came Alone pp. 242–244. The story is available also on the web with a translation to Hebrew on the site I Came alone.

Petuchowski's article, "The Theological Significance of the Parable in Rabbinic Literature and the New Testament," can be read at JerusalemPerspective.com.

== Sources ==
- Henrix, Hans Herman, "Jakob J Petuchowski (1925–1991): Rabbi, Scholar, Ecumenist" in: Gerhards, Albert and Leonhard, Clemens (editors), Jewish and Christian Liturgy and Worship: New Insights Into Its History and Interaction (2007), Brill, Leiden; Boston, ISBN 978 90 04 16201 3
- Leverton, Bertha, and Shmuel Lowensohn. I Came Alone: The Stories of the Kindertransports. Sussex, England: Book Guild, 1990, pp. 242–244.
