= Käthe Heinemann =

German woman pianist

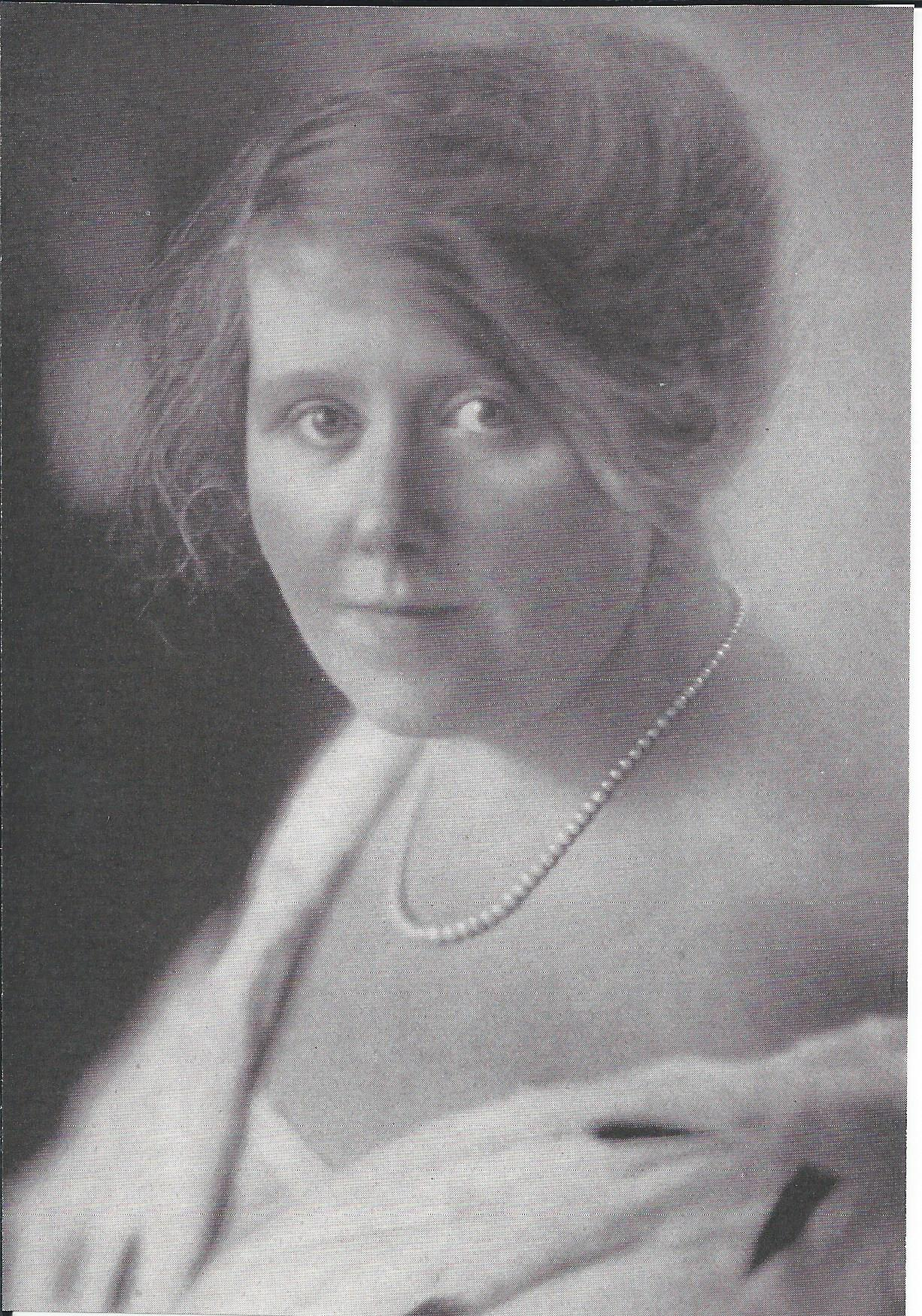
Käthe Heinemann c. 1929

Käthe Heinemann (10 November 1891 – 7 April 1975) was a German pianist and music educator.

== Life ==
Heinemann was born to the composer Wilhelm Heinemann (1862-1952) in Spandau. She grew up in Berlin-Spandau in the "Heinemann House" named after her father at Behnitz 5 next to the Schleuse Spandau. Her father was the founder of the Spandau Conservatory. Wilhelm Heinemann recognized his daughter's talent at an early age and encouraged her musical education by teaching her intensively himself. Especially her technical skills were noticeable. At the age of ten she performed her first public concert; music critics gave her the nickname "Spandauer Wunderkind". The composer and pianist Eugen d'Albert personally took over her further education, along with a few other teachers.

From 1902 to at least 1904, she was taught at the Franz Liszt Academy in Berlin and Gotha by the Liszts' student Martha Remmert (1853–1941). From the age of 14, Heinemann herself worked as a music pedagogue and music teacher for piano students. In 1915 she received a teaching position for piano at the Hüttner-Conservatory (Hüttner-Hochschule für Musik) in Dortmund; there she directed the master class, which was normally only taught by professors, for two years. "In 1925 she became a member of the examination board of the Berlin University of the Arts. Among her students was Hertha Klust, who, among others, accompanied Dietrich Fischer-Dieskau.

From 1920 to 1933 Heinemann had great success as a concert pianist. She played as a soloist with, among others, the Berlin Philharmonic, the Gewandhausorchester Leipzig, the Gürzenich-Orchester Köln and the Vienna Philharmonic. She worked with conductors like Arthur Nikisch, Erich Kleiber, Carl Schuricht, Alfredo Casella and Karl Ristenpart. At the beginning of 1926 she played the solo part of the premiere of the Concerto for Piano and Orchestra (op. 72) by Paul Graener with the Philharmonic Orchestra of Hagen directed by Hans Weisbach. After the Second World War, she performed as soloist together with the Deutsches Symphonie-Orchester Berlin. (RSO) and the RIAS Chamber Orchestra. In January 1948 she played the Appassionata in F minor by Ludwig van Beethoven and the Revolutionsetüde by Frédéric Chopin; in addition, she accompanied the actor and singer Ernst Busch on the piano in four Russian songs.

Heinemann gave concerts and taught until old age. She gave annual concerts for the population in her hometown of Spandau, as she did on 25 January 1935 in Koch's Bismarck Halls. On her 80th birthday she played the Piano Concerto No. 4 by Ludwig van Beethoven with the Haydn Orchestra Berlin.

Heinemann died in 1975 at the age of 84 in Spandau. She was buried at the cemetery In den Kisseln in Berlin-Spandau. The burial place has been abandoned in the meantime.

Heinemann was awarded the Order of Merit of the Federal Republic of Germany.

== Recordings ==
- Welte, Edwin, Bockisch, Karl. Reproduktionen nach Künstlern u. Komponisten geordnet. Freiburg i.Br.: M.Welte & Söhne, 1925. Rollennummern: 3834, 3835, 3836, 3837, 3838, 3839, 3840, 3841, 3842, 3843, 3844, 3845, 3846, 3847, 3848, 3849, 3850, 3851, 3852, 3853
- Frédéric Chopin, Berceuse, Electrola Gesellschaft m.b.H, Nowawes und Berlin, Kat.Nr. E.G.1465, (8-45522), ca. 1929
- Clemens Schmalstich, Konzertetude op. 81, "Die Quelle", Electrola Gesellschaft m.b.H, Nowawes und Berlin, Kat.Nr. E.G.1465, (8-45523), ca. 1929
- Kurt Stiebitz, Sonate Es-Dur, op. 76, für Klavier, RIAS Berlin, recorded 5 June 1961, Auftragsnummer 213-802, Sendung am 12. Juni 1961, Archiv: Deutschlandradio Kultur Nr. 42–13802

== Honours ==
- 1972: Order of Merit of the Federal Republic of Germany
