= Heinz A. Lowenstam =

German-born Jewish-American paleoecologist

Heinz Adolf Lowenstam
- Born: October 9, 1912; Siemjanowicz, Upper Silesia, Germany
- Died: June 7, 1993 (aged 80); Pasadena, California, United States
- Citizenship: German (at birth); American (from 1943)
- Education: Ludwig-Maximilians-Universität München; University of Chicago
- Known for: Biomineralization; Geology of fossil coral reefs
- Awards: Paleontological Society Medal (1986); National Academy of Sciences
- Scientific career
- Fields: Paleontology, Paleoecology
- Workplaces: Caltech

Heinz Adolf Lowenstam (9 October 1912 – 7 June 1993) was a German-born, Jewish-American paleoecologist celebrated for his discoveries in biomineralization: that living organisms manufacture substances such as the iron-containing mineral magnetite within their bodies. He is also renowned for his pioneering research on coral reefs and their influence on biologic processes in the geologic record.

== Early life and education ==
Heinz Adolf Lowenstam was born in 1912 in Upper Silesia, which was then southeastern Germany but was ceded to Poland following World War I. His father, Kurt (1883–1965), was the younger brother of Rabbi Arthur Löwenstamm. His mother was Frieda Sternberg (born in 1889). He had a younger sister, Hildegard (Hilda), who married Kurt Weissenberg and had a daughter, Doris.

Heinz's hometown of Siemjanowicz was located in a mining district, and his fascination with geology began as a child playing on the piles of mine tailings, against the backdrop of Germany's great economic depression of the 1920s. His scientific interests were encouraged by his family and fostered through his attendance at an experimental hochschule that focused on mathematics, physics, and chemistry. It was here that Heinz started his first fossil collection and shaped his desire to become a paleontologist.

== Professional career ==
Lowenstam began his collegiate studies in the vertebrate paleontology program at the University of Frankfurt, but arrived to find the program collapsing due to the recent death of the university's leading paleontologist. He transferred to the Ludwig-Maximilians-Universität München in the fall of 1933, studying under Professors Broili, Edgar Dacqué, and the biologist Karl von Frisch. Lowenstam's studies at the Ludwig-Maximilians-Universität München coincided with Adolf Hitler's rise to power and the deterioration of conditions for German Jews. According to his biographer, Joseph L. Kirschvink, "In 1935, he declared his intention of conducting his Ph.D. field research in Palestine, to the dismay of his pro-Nazi department chairman". After spending 18 months studying the geology of the Eastern Nazareth Mountains, he returned to Germany in 1936 to learn that a new law was passed one week prior to his thesis defense prohibited the awarding of doctorates to Jews. Left with no choice but to leave, Heinz and his wife Ilse immigrated to the United States, arriving in Chicago in June 1937. His parents and sister were able to escape to Brazil, but most of Heinz's relatives on his mother's side were murdered in the Holocaust.

Lowenstam discussed his situation with the geology faculty at the University of Chicago, and was accepted to complete his degree, on the merit of recommendations from his mentors Broili and Dacqué. He received his Ph.D. in 1939, whereupon he immediately enlisted in the U.S. Army to fight the Nazis. The U.S. military decided that his skills would be of more use in civilian work, developing coal and oil reserves with the Illinois Geological Survey. Subsequently, Lowenstam worked for a small oil company, then moved on to become a curator of invertebrate paleontology at the Illinois State Museum. There, Lowenstam conducted field research on the paleoecology of coral reef environments via the Stony Island line of the Chicago street-car system, which dead-ended at an area rich with fossilized coral reefs. This work ultimately resulted in Lowenstam's discovery of a "massive system of Silurian reefs that stretched from the edge of the Ozark Mountains to Greenland". Lowenstam was aware that the structure of the buried reef complex was an ideal trap for oil and gas; but, instead of exploiting his discovery for financial gain, he published his findings in the open scientific literature where all could reap the benefits.

During this time, the University of Chicago had emerged as the birthplace of isotope geochemistry, and Harold Urey's research group was making significant advancements in the use of deviations in stable isotopes to measure ancient ocean temperatures. While working as a geologist in Illinois State Geological Survey's Coal, and Stratigraphy and Paleontology Divisions, Lowenstam was invited to join Harold Urey's group to aid in acquiring fossil materials. He accepted a position as a research associate in geochemistry at the University of Chicago and by 1950, was convinced to accept a faculty position. This position allowed Lowenstam to "continue his research on Silurian reefs, as well as to extend his search for pristine fossil shell materials, an interest that later paved the way for his studies on biomineralization". In the early 1950s, Caltech and the University of California began the building of their isotope geochemistry programs and their recruitment of young scientists from Urey's group and the geochemists of the Chicago "mafia" to form the core of their departments. By the time Lowenstam accepted his faculty position at Caltech in 1954, many of his colleagues including Harrison Brown, Sam Epstein, Clair Patterson, and even Harold Urey had already made the migration. Under his chosen title as a "paleoecologist" Lowenstam continued to collaborate with his former research group (Brown, Patterson, and Epstein were all at Caltech), but he also used the opportunity to explore more comprehensive geochemical analyses of fossil formation.

Lowenstam sought to develop geochemical methods to gain insight into the biological processes through which organisms control mineralization as well as derive information about ancient ecosystems, such as salinity and barometric pressure. For these studies, he turned to the environments of modern coral reef systems in Bermuda. In his early work in the region, Lowenstam discovered that the aragonite (a CaCO_{3} mineral produce by reef organisms) "needles forming most of the sedimentary mass in Bermuda's back-reef lagoons of Bermuda were produced by microscopic algae; using carbon and oxygen isotopes to prove their biological origin". But it was Lowenstam's 1961 discovery of "biochemically-precipitated magnetite (Fe_{3}O_{4}) as a capping material in the radula (tongue plate) teeth of chitons (marine mollusks)" that was to shape the future of biomineralization. "Prior to this discovery, magnetite was thought to form only in igneous or metamorphic rocks under high temperatures and pressures". In his 1962 paper, Lowenstam noted the implications of his discovery with his observation that the chitons were known for their local homing instinct, implying that they may be using a magnetite compass to aid in navigation. Subsequent researchers building upon this work have "confirmed the central role of magnetite as the biophysical transducer of the magnetic field in living organisms spanning the evolutionary spectrum from the magnetotactic bacteria to mammals, with a fossil record extending back at least 2 billion years on Earth and perhaps 4 billion years on Mars". Lowenstam left implications of biomagnetism for others to explore and continued to pursue answers to how organisms control mineral formation. Over the next two decades Lowenstam continued to discover and catalog biologically precipitated minerals and document their phyletic distribution, as well as attempt to track their evolutionary origin.

He remained at Caltech as a revered professor until his death in 1993.

== Honours and awards ==
Heinz A. Lowenstam was elected to the National Academy of Sciences in 1980 and traveled to Germany in 1981 to receive an honorary Ph.D. from the Ludwig-Maximilians-Universität München. He received the Paleontological Society Medal in 1986.

== Personal life ==
Heinz A. Lowenstam married Ilse Weil (1912–2011) in Munich on 10 January 1937; they divorced in the 1960s. They had three children together: Ruth, Michael and Steven. Steven (1945–2003) was a professor of classics at the University of Oregon. Ruth's daughter, Lisa Goldstein, is a rabbi in New York City.

== Legacy ==
Lowenstam's papers are held at the California Institute of Technology. Every five years, the European Association of Geochemistry awards a Science Innovation Award medal named in Lowenstam's honour for work in biogeochemistry.
