= Gatow =

- Quarter of Berlin
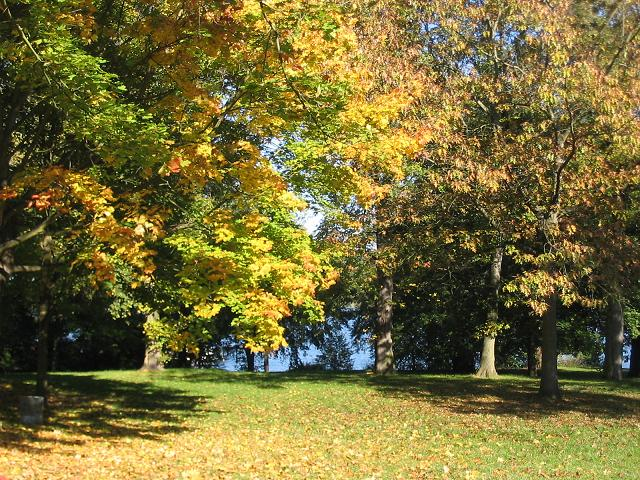
- Panoramic by the Havel river

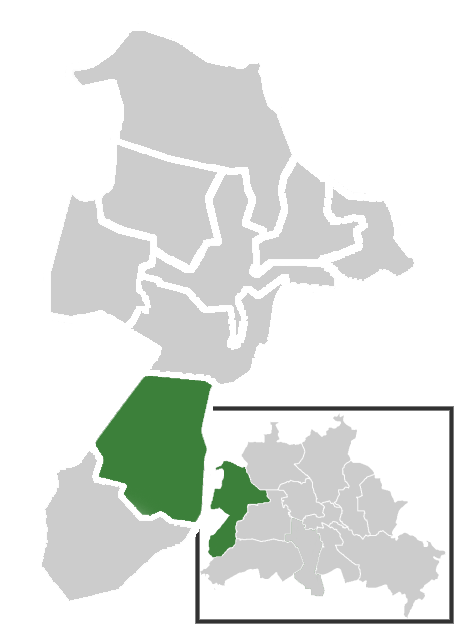
- Location of Gatow in Spandau district and Berlin
- Interactive map of Gatow
- Location within Germany Location within Berlin
- Coordinates: 52°29′20″N 13°10′54″E
- Country: Germany
- State: Berlin
- City: Berlin
- Borough: Spandau
- Founded: 1258

Area
  - Total: 10.1 km^{2} (3.9 sq mi)
- Elevation: 35 m (115 ft)

Population (2024-12-31)
  - Total: 3,530
  - Density: 350/km^{2} (905/sq mi)
- Time zone: UTC+01:00 (CET)
  - Summer (DST): UTC+02:00 (CEST)
- Postal codes: 14089
- Vehicle registration: B

Gatow (German: [ˈɡaːtoː]), a district of south-western Berlin is located west of the Havelsee lake and has forested areas within its boundaries. It is within the borough of Spandau. On 31 December 2002, it had 5,532 inhabitants.

== History ==
Gatow's existence was first recorded in 1258 under the name of Gatho. In 1558, the village of Gatow became part of Spandau. Following the division of Berlin into four sectors at the end of the Second World War, Gatow became part of the British sector of West Berlin in early July 1945.

=== Gatow airfield ===
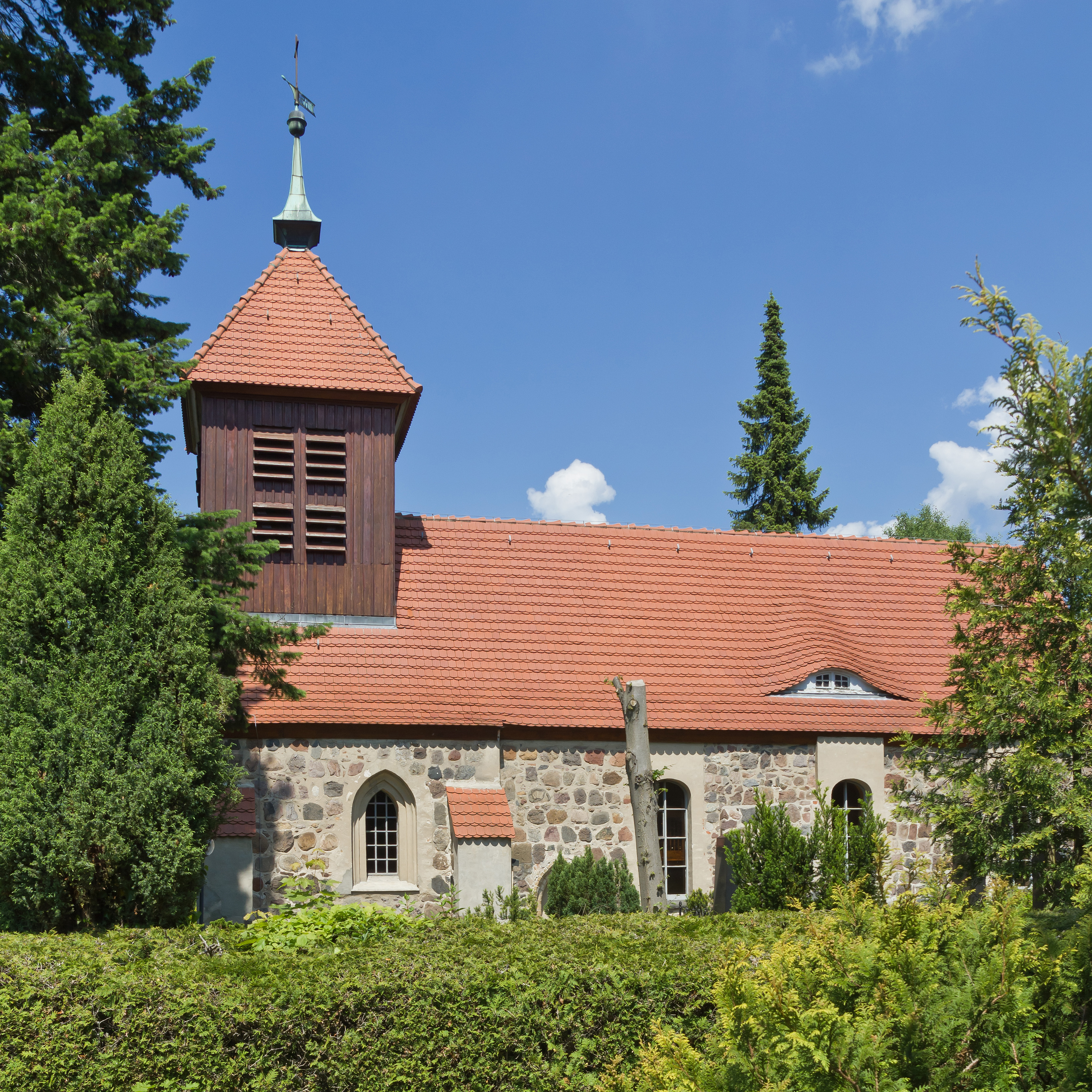
The village church in Gatow

Gatow was between 1934 and 1994 home to an airfield, first used by the Luftwaffe as a staff and technical college, Luftkriegsschule II, and then postwar by the British Royal Air Force (RAF) and Army Air Corps as RAF Gatow. RAF Gatow was one of the destination airports of the Berlin Airlift, including Short Sunderlands of the RAF, the corrosion-resistant flying boats being used to transport salt from Hamburg to Berlin. They landed on the adjacent Havelsee, a wide reach of the river Havel.

The airfield was handed back to German ownership on 7 September 1994 and was kept in use as a German Air Force airfield for a very short time, being closed to air traffic in 1995. It is now called General-Steinhoff-Kaserne, named after the World War II fighter ace and West German Air Force general Johannes Steinhoff; it is home to the Militärhistorisches Museum Flugplatz Berlin-Gatow. This, the official Berlin museum of the German Armed Forces, has many displays and information on German military aviation and the history of the airfield. The history of RAF Gatow and of western forces in Berlin from 1945 to 1994 is told in the Alliierten Museum (Allied Museum) in a different part of Berlin.

The former airfield is now part of the adjoining district of Berlin-Kladow.
