= Georg von Petersenn =

German music educator

Georg (Georges) Ferdinand von Petersenn (13 September 1849 – 14 November 1930) was a German music educator.

== Life ==
Born in Valmiera (Latvia), Petersenn was the youngest of five children of Heinrich von Petersenn and his wife Jutta, née Baroness von Engelhardt. After finishing secondary school, he studied law in Dorpat from 1870 until 1872, then music in Würzburg and Munich until 1875. Additionally he gave private piano lessons. On 11 April 1882 he married his pupil Bertha Rindfleisch, 13 years younger than him, daughter of the respected pathologist Eduard von Rindfleisch. The marriage produced one child: daughter Jutta (born 1888 in Berlin). In 1911 Jutta von Petersenn married Hermann Lietz, founder of the first German Landerziehungsheim.

In 1884, the couple moved to Berlin. There, Petersenn was appointed professor at the "Königl. Hochschule für Musik" (now merged with the Universität der Künste Berlin). When his wife, Bertha von Petersenn, moved her "Landerziehungsheim für Mädchen" from Stolper See to Gaienhofen Castle on Lake Constance (which was first leased and bought by Georg von Petersenn in 1905) in 1904, he taught music there. The nobleman remained associated with the school of the same name until his death in at the age of 81.
