= Altstadt Spandau =

Coordinates: 52°32′20″N 13°12′23″E

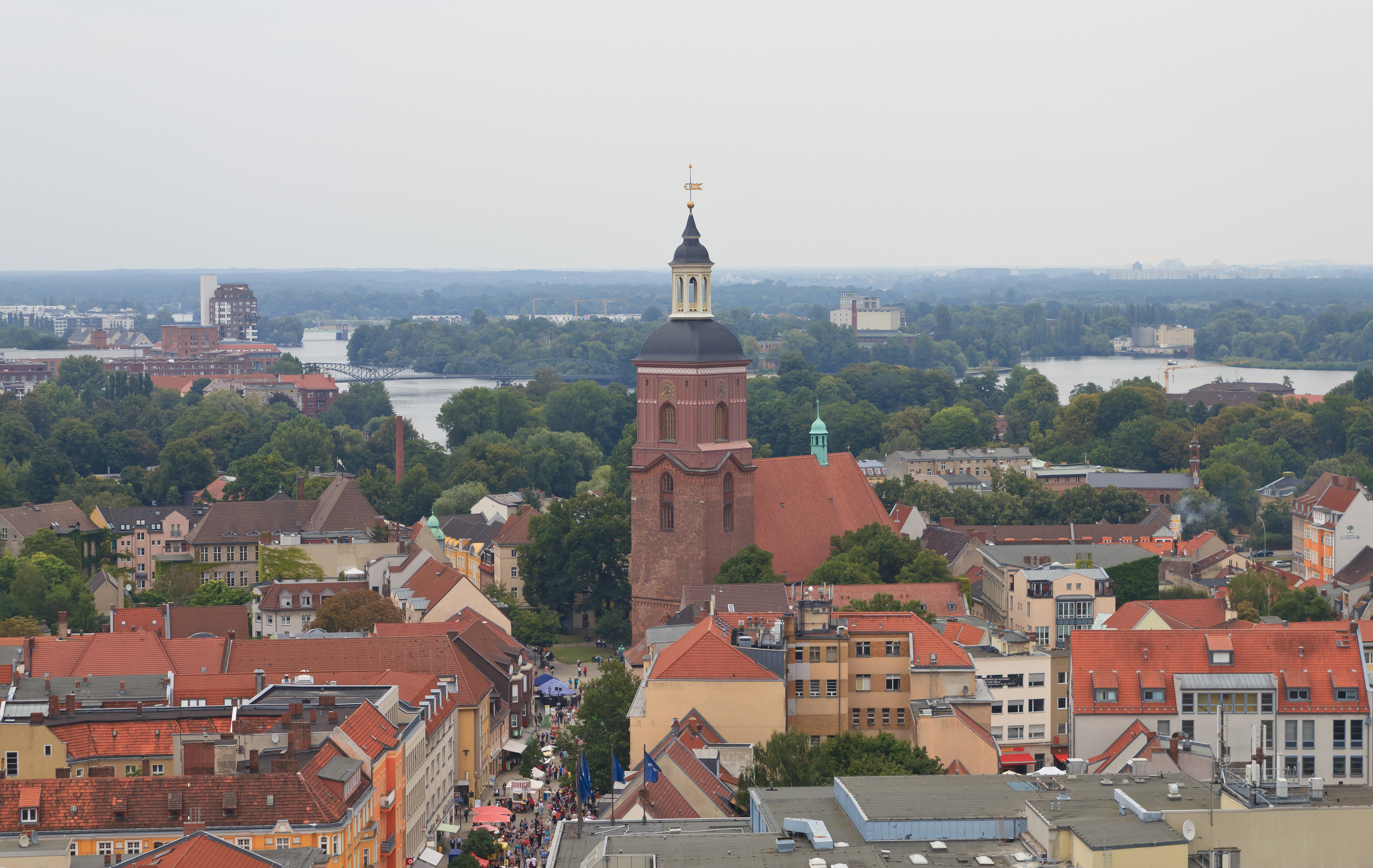
View of Altstadt Spandau with St. Nicholas Church

Altstadt Spandau is the historic centre (old town) of the Spandau borough in the western suburbs of Berlin, situated on the right bank of the Havel river by its confluence with the Spree tributary. It arose near the site of a former Slavic gord during the German eastward expansion (Ostsiedlung) in the early 13th century. A castle at Spandowe, erected on a Havel island to secure the eastern borderlands of the Margraviate of Brandenburg, was already documented in an 1197 deed issued by the Ascanian margrave Otto II.

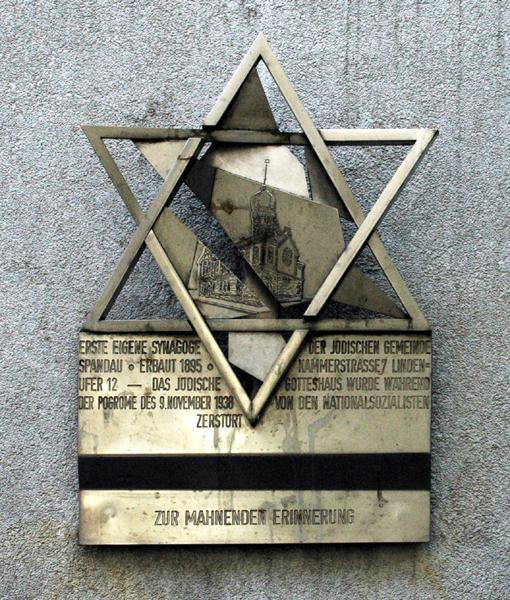
Plaque commemorating the synagogue at Spandau, which was built in 1895 and destroyed on Kristallnacht in 1938. The plaque, on Lindenufer and the corner of Chamber Street (the site of the former synagogue in Altstadt Spandau), was sculpted by Volkmar Haase

The city itself was first mentioned on 7 March 1232, when the Spandau citizens were vested with further privileges by the Brandenburg margraves John I and Otto III. A first church is documented in 1240; the present-day Saint Nicholas Church was built in the late 14th century. It became the initial point of the Protestant Reformation in Brandenburg, when on 1 November 1539 Elector Joachim II Hector converted to Lutheranism and celebrated the first communion under both kinds here. A Jewish community in Spandau existed since the 13th century, a synagogue is documented since 1342.

The Hohenzollern elector also had the city protected from attacks by the Spandau Citadel, a Renaissance fortress erected at the site of the medieval castle from about 1560 onwards. The walled-up Altstadt quarter became the nucleus of the larger Spandau Fortress, built under Prussian rule after the Napoleonic Wars in the early 19th century, also a centre of the German arms industry.

Today the Altstadt quarter is served by Rathaus Spandau and Altstadt Spandau stations on the Berlin U-Bahn line U7. Berlin-Spandau station, served by S-Bahn, regional and intercity railway routes, is situated to the south of the Altstadt.
