= Spandau Synagogue =

Destroyed Orthodox synagogue in Berlin, Germany

- German: Synagoge Spandau
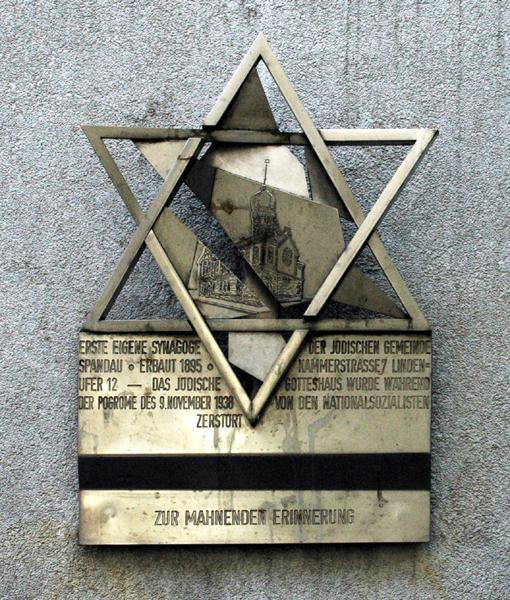
- Memorial plaque with image of the destroyed synagogue

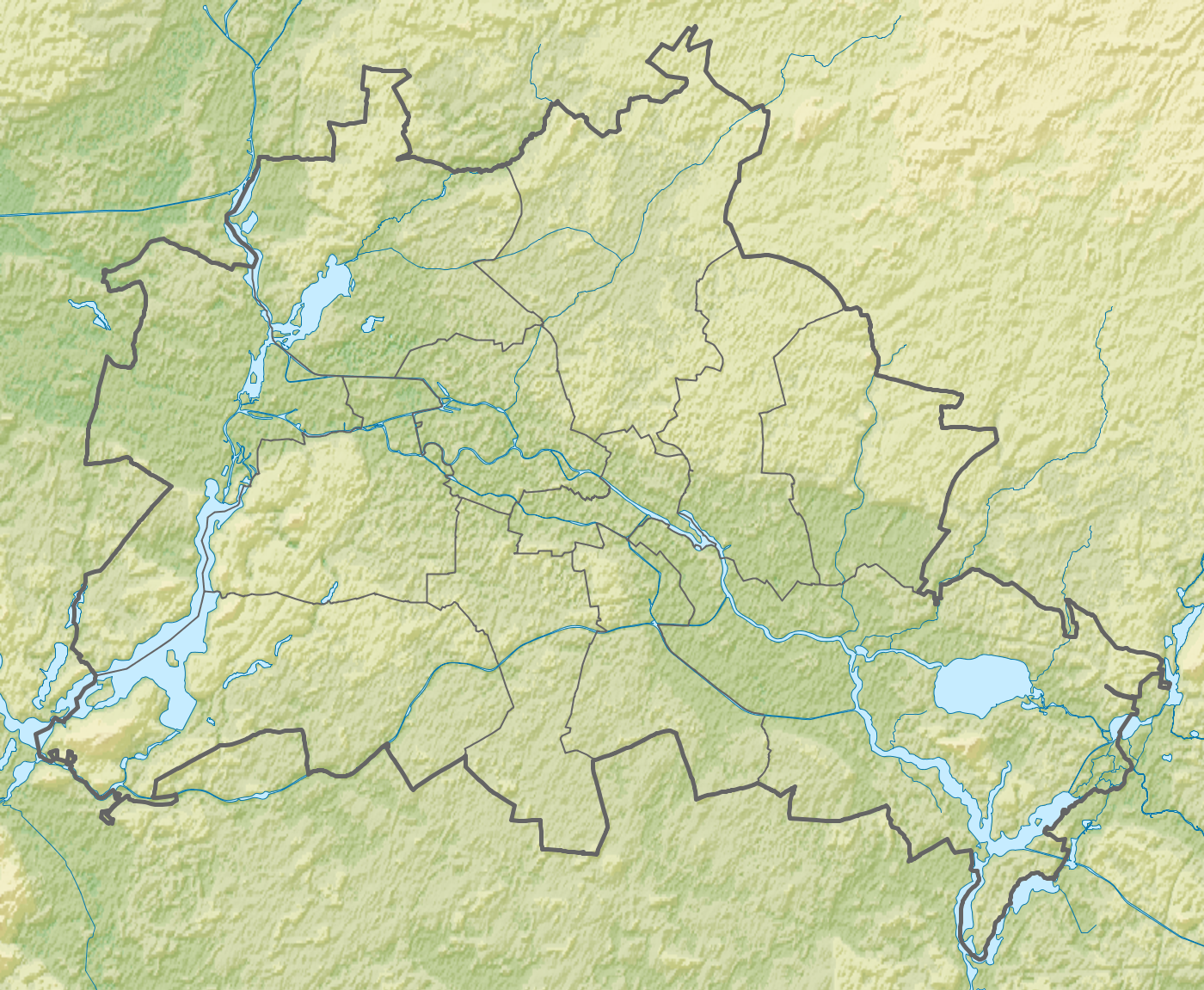
- Location of the former synagogue in Berlin

Religion
- Affiliation: Orthodox Judaism (former)
- Ecclesiastical or organizational status: Synagogue
- Leadership: Rabbi Arthur Löwenstamm (1917–1938)
- Status: Destroyed (1938)

Location
- Location: 12 Lindenufer, Spandau, Berlin
- Country: Germany
- Interactive map of Spandau Synagogue
- Coordinates: 52°32′13″N 13°12′28″E

Architecture
- Architect: Cremer & Wolffenstein
- Type: Historicist architecture
- Established: c. 1844 (as a congregation)
- Completed: 1895
- Destroyed: 9 November 1938 (during Kristallnacht); 1942 (demolished)
- Capacity: 296 seats

The Spandau Synagogue (German: Synagoge Spandau) was a former Orthodox Jewish congregation and synagogue, located at 12 Lindenufer, in the Old Town area of Spandau, Berlin, Germany.

Also known as Spandauer Vereinssynagoge (translated as Spandau private synagogue), the synagogue was built in 1894–95 and destroyed during Kristallnacht on 9 November 1938 when it was set on fire. (Note: Frederic Zeller (1924–1994), who was then a Jewish teenager in Spandau, gives an eyewitness account of the burning of the synagogue in his memoir.) The ruins were removed, probably in 1942. The site is now marked by a memorial tablet, installed in 1988. The congregation maintained a Jewish cemetery, on Spandau's Neue Bergstrasse, which was closed by the Nazi government and was evacuated in 1939 to the cemetery of the Orthodox congregation Adass Jisroel in Berlin.

== History ==
In 1844 there were six Jewish families in Spandau. They held services in rented rooms. Late in 1894, Berlin-based architects Wilhelm Albert Cremer and Richard Wolffenstein began the construction of the modern community's first and only synagogue, (Note: Jews are known to have settled in Spandau as early as the 13th century and a synagogue existed in 1342. The community was expelled in the 15th century and Jews did not return until the 18th century.) which was dedicated by the Spandau Jewish community on 15 September 1895 in the presence of Spandau's Mayor, Wilhelm Georg Koeltze (1852–1939), and other local dignitaries. The building, on a street corner with façades on two sides, was crowned by an octagonal tower.

On 6 December 1916, Arthur Löwenstamm became the synagogue's first permanent rabbi. He took up his duties on 1 April 1917 and continued until the autumn of 1938. In May 1939, the congregation became part of the official Jewish Community of Berlin.

== Memorials ==
=== Memorial commemorating the synagogue ===
At the initiative of the Spandau Borough Council, a memorial tablet was unveiled in 1988 on the site of the former synagogue. On 9 November 2005, a memorial plaque was placed on the pavement in front of Löwenstamm's former home at Feldstraße 11, in Spandau, and close to a former Jewish old people's home which had been maintained by the synagogue.

=== Memorial to the Deported and Murdered Jews of Spandau ===
Designed by Ruth Golan and Kay Zareh a memorial was installed in 1988, in a park opposite the site of the former synagogue, dedicated in honour of the Jews from Spandau who were deported and murdered by the Nazis. The memorial symbolises a building and tower that were violently torn down, with one now behind the other. Through the split tower an eternal light shines as a symbol of remembrance of the dead.

In 2012, the memorial was extended by a brick wall on which the names of 115 deported and murdered Jews from Spandau are recorded. Also designed by Golan and Zareh, the project was supported by the Evangelical Church of Spandau district, the district office of Spandau and private sponsors. The memorial was inaugurated on 9 November 2012, on the 74th anniversary of Kristallnacht. The German inscription on the memorial, located on Lindenufer (Altstadt Spandau) at 52°32′13″N 13°12′28″E, reads:

This memorial commemorates the suffering of Spandau's citizens of Jewish faith during the Terror of the National Socialists. Not far from this point, at Lindenufer 12, stood the Jewish house of worship, which was destroyed in 1938.

== Gallery ==
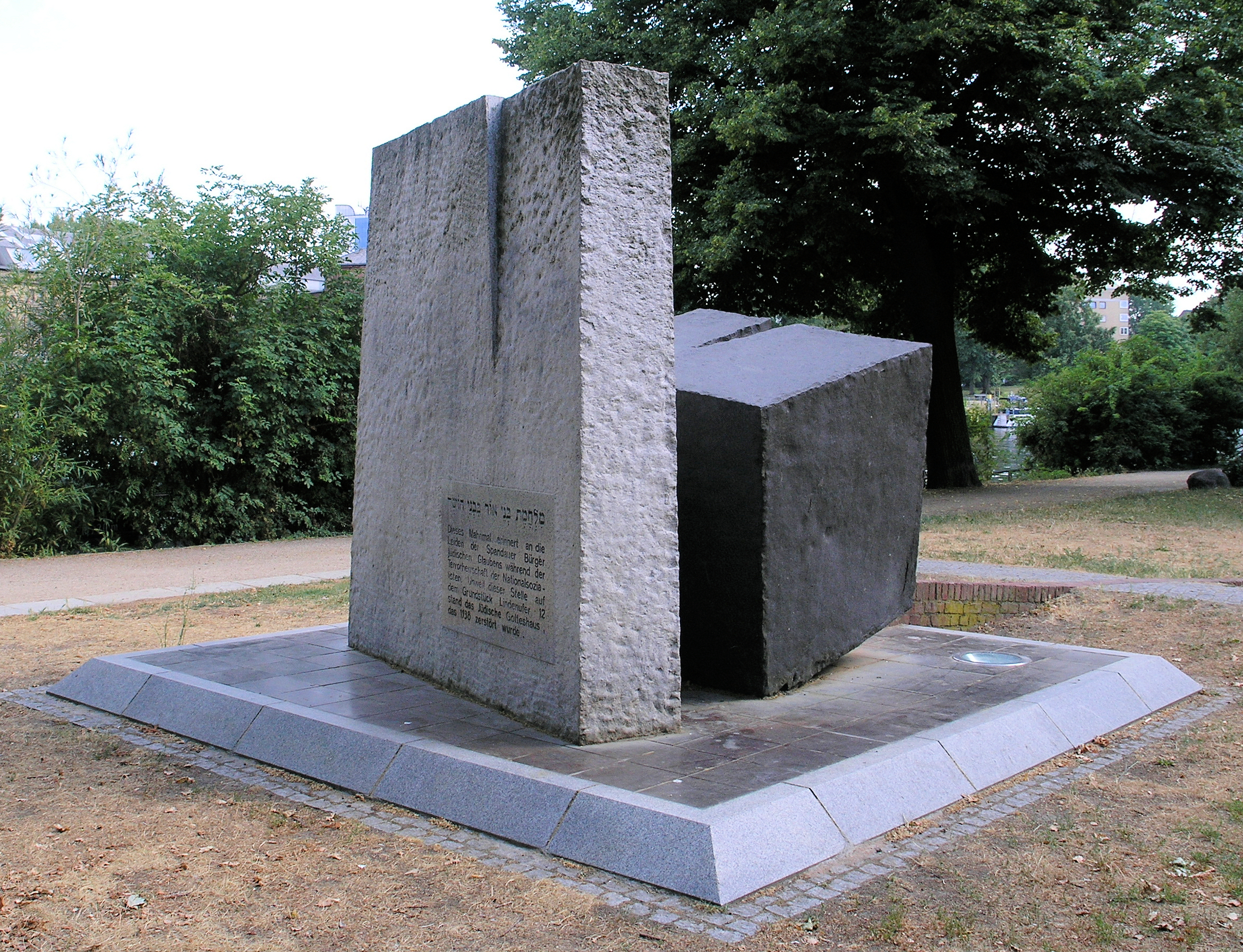
Memorial for the deported and murdered Jews of Spandau, sculpted by Golan and Zareh and erected in 1988.

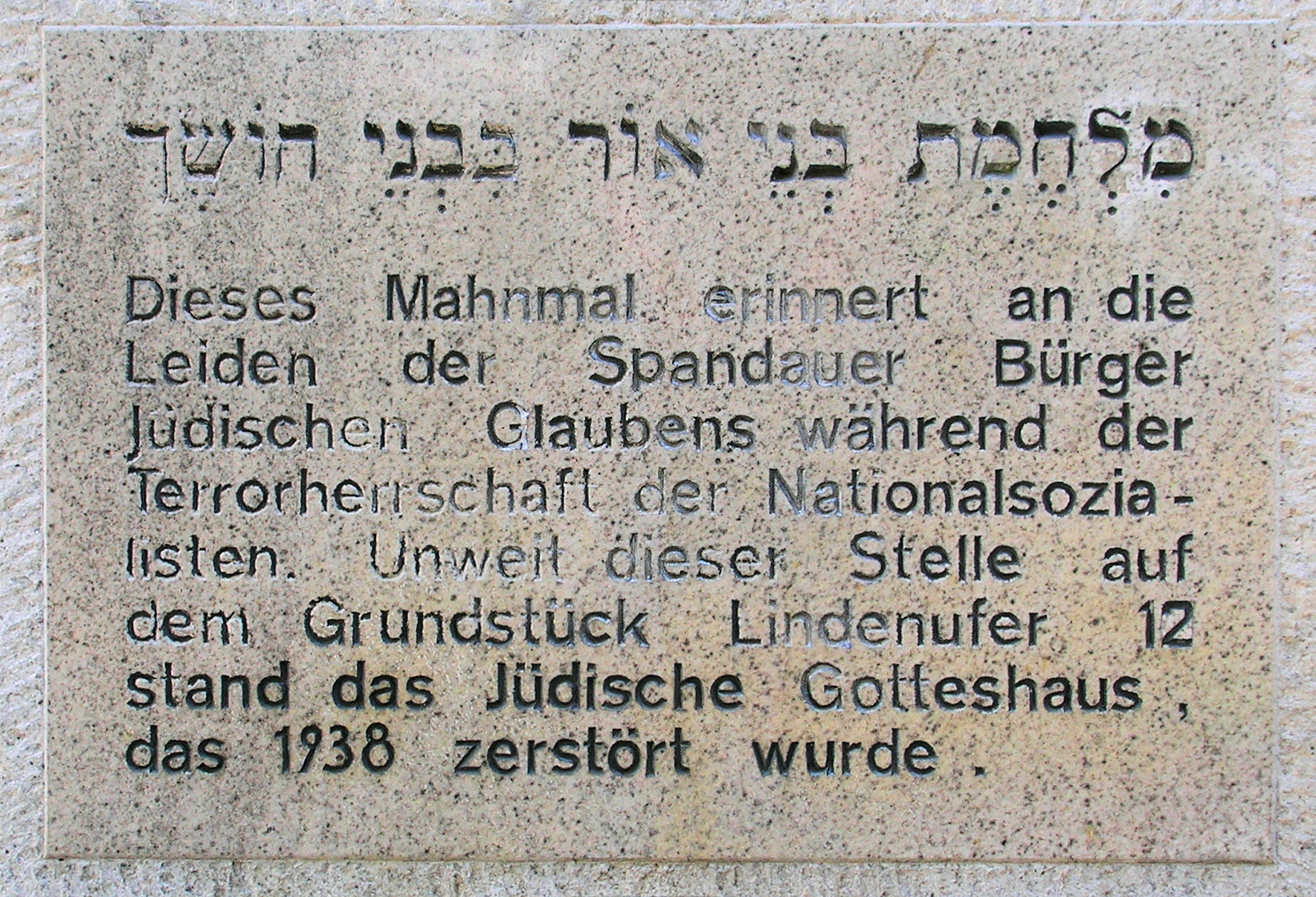
Inscription on the memorial, English translation above.

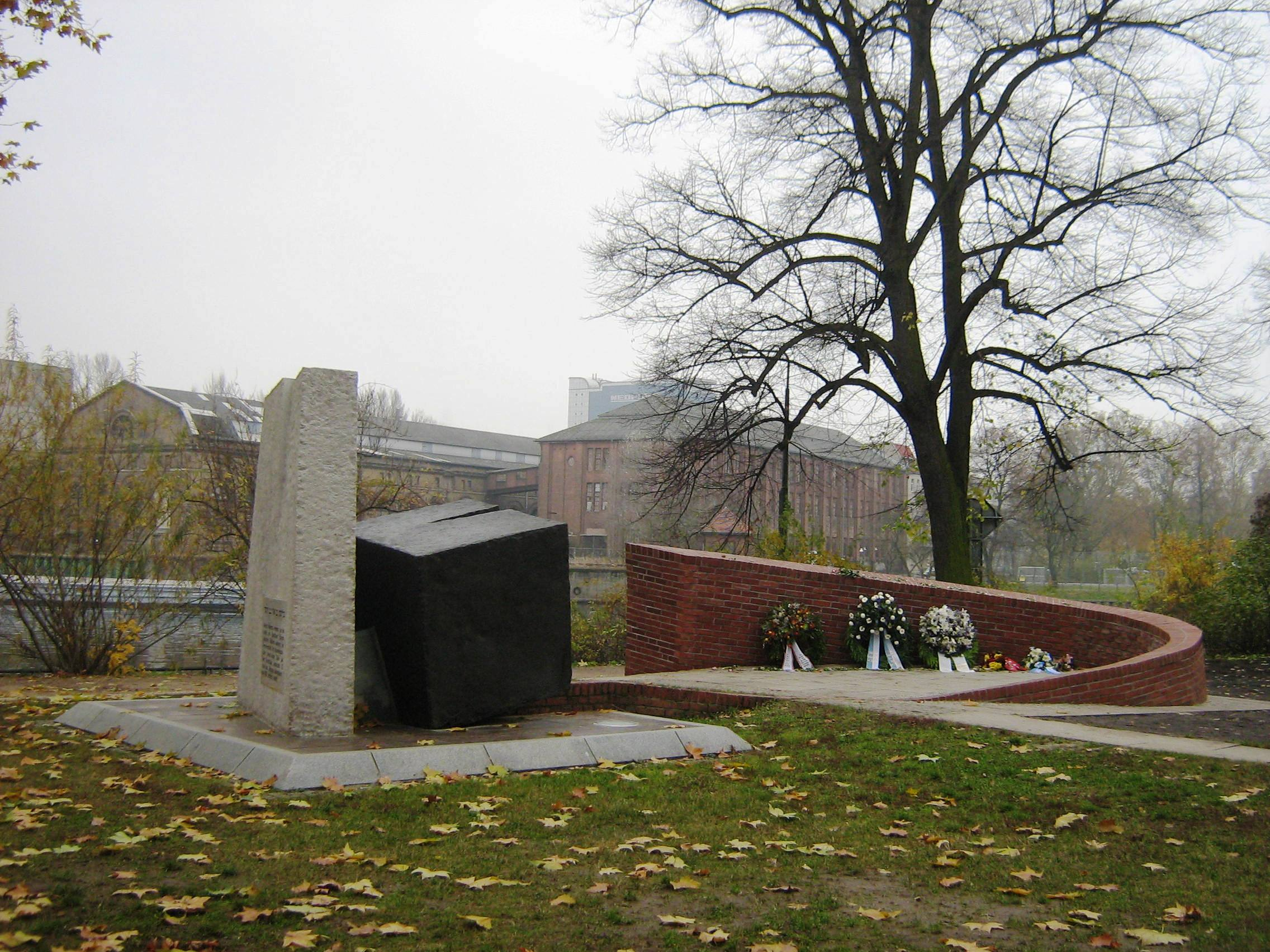
2012 extension of the memorial with the names of 115 Spandau Jews who were deported and murdered.

== See also ==
- History of the Jews in Germany
- List of synagogues in Germany (in German)
- Monuments in Spandau (in German)
