= Spree Island =

Island in Germany

Coordinates: 52°31′00″N 13°24′07″E

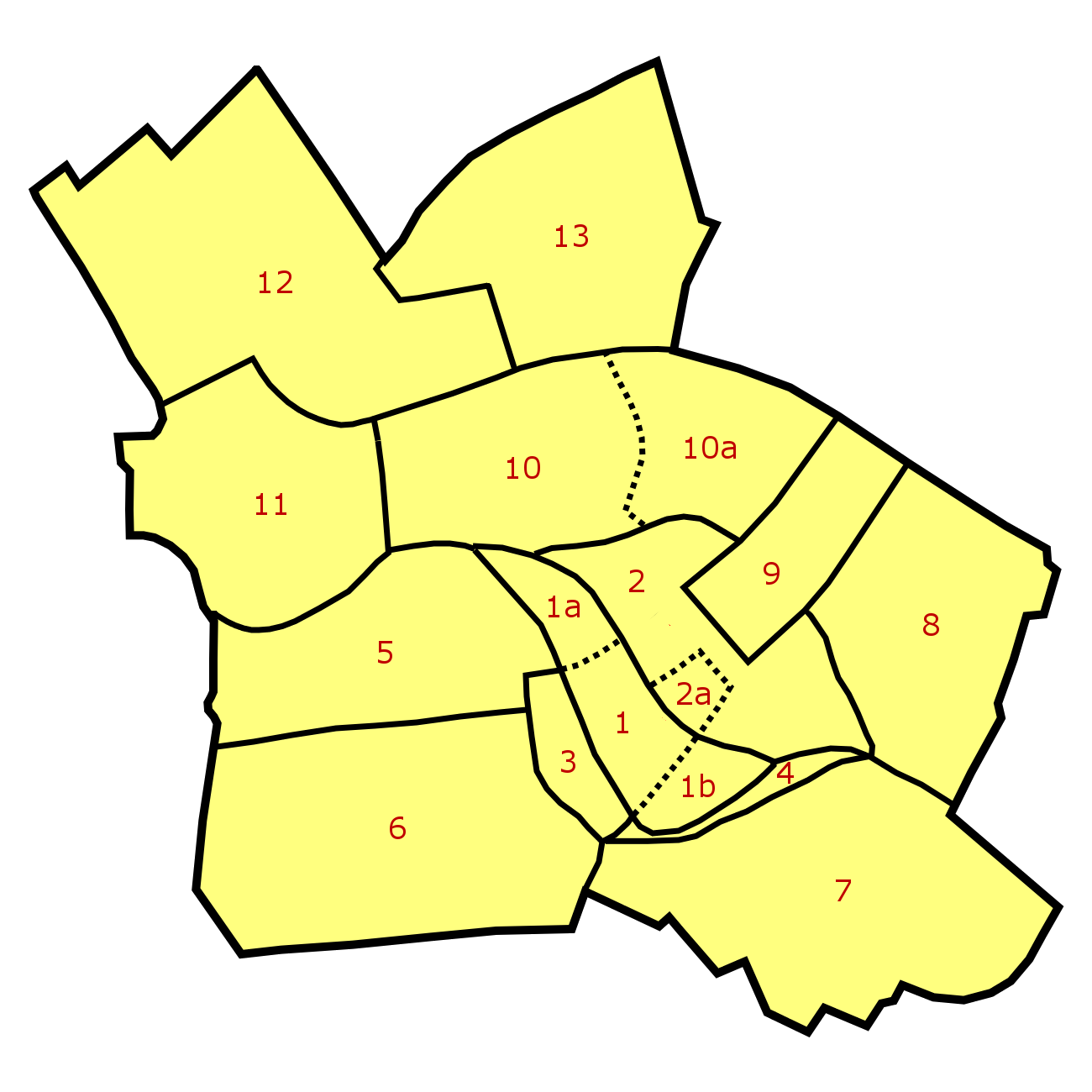
Quarters of Berlin-Mitte: Cölln (the Spreeinsel) (1); Museum Island (1a); Fisher Island (1b); Alt-Berlin (2); Nikolaiviertel (2a); Friedrichswerder (3); Neukölln am Wasser (4); Dorotheenstadt (5); Friedrichstadt (6); Luisenstadt (7); Stralauer Vorstadt (8); Alexanderplatz (9); Spandauer Vorstadt (10); Scheunenviertel (10a); Friedrich-Wilhelm-Stadt (11); Oranienburger Vorstadt (12); Rosenthaler Vorstadt (13)

The Spree Island (Spreeinsel) is an island in the River Spree which was formerly the location of the city of Cölln, the historic core of the modern Berlin-Mitte locality of the eponymous Mitte borough in central Berlin. The island is divided into three districts. The northern part of the island is known as Museum Island. The southern part is the Fischerinsel (Fisher Island). The middle has no distinct name.

== Museumsinsel (North) ==
The Museumsinsel in the north, in the middle ages a swamp, accommodated parks such as the Lustgarten and museums starting in the 19th century and since 1999 a UNESCO world heritage site. Many of the prominent museums of Berlin are located here, such as the Bode Museum, the Pergamon Museum and the Alte Nationalgalerie.

== The Middle ==
The Middle featured a medieval castle for the noblemen of Brandenburg and the Kings of Prussia that were also the German Kaisers after 1871. Then known as the Berliner Stadtschloss, it suffered heavy damages in WWII and was torn down in 1950. It was partially reconstructed in 2021 as the headquarters of the Humboldt Forum.

Before German reunification, the middle district featured many prominent buildings of the Regime of East Germany. The size of the Berliner Stadtschloss was known as the Marx-Engels-Platz with the prominent Palast der Republik, (opened 1976). In the South stood the Staatsratsgebäude (built 1964) and the seat of the Volkskammer was built in the East of the island. Of these buildings, only the Staatsratsgebäude still stands today.

== Fischerinsel (South) ==
The south today kown as Fischerinsel was the location of the city of Cölln until 1709, when it grew together with Berlin. It is named after the former Fischerkiez, a fishermen's settlement which formerly occupied the southern end of the island. The Fischerinsel is normally said to extend south from Gertraudenstraße. Today it features many modern high-rise apartment buildings.

== Gallery ==
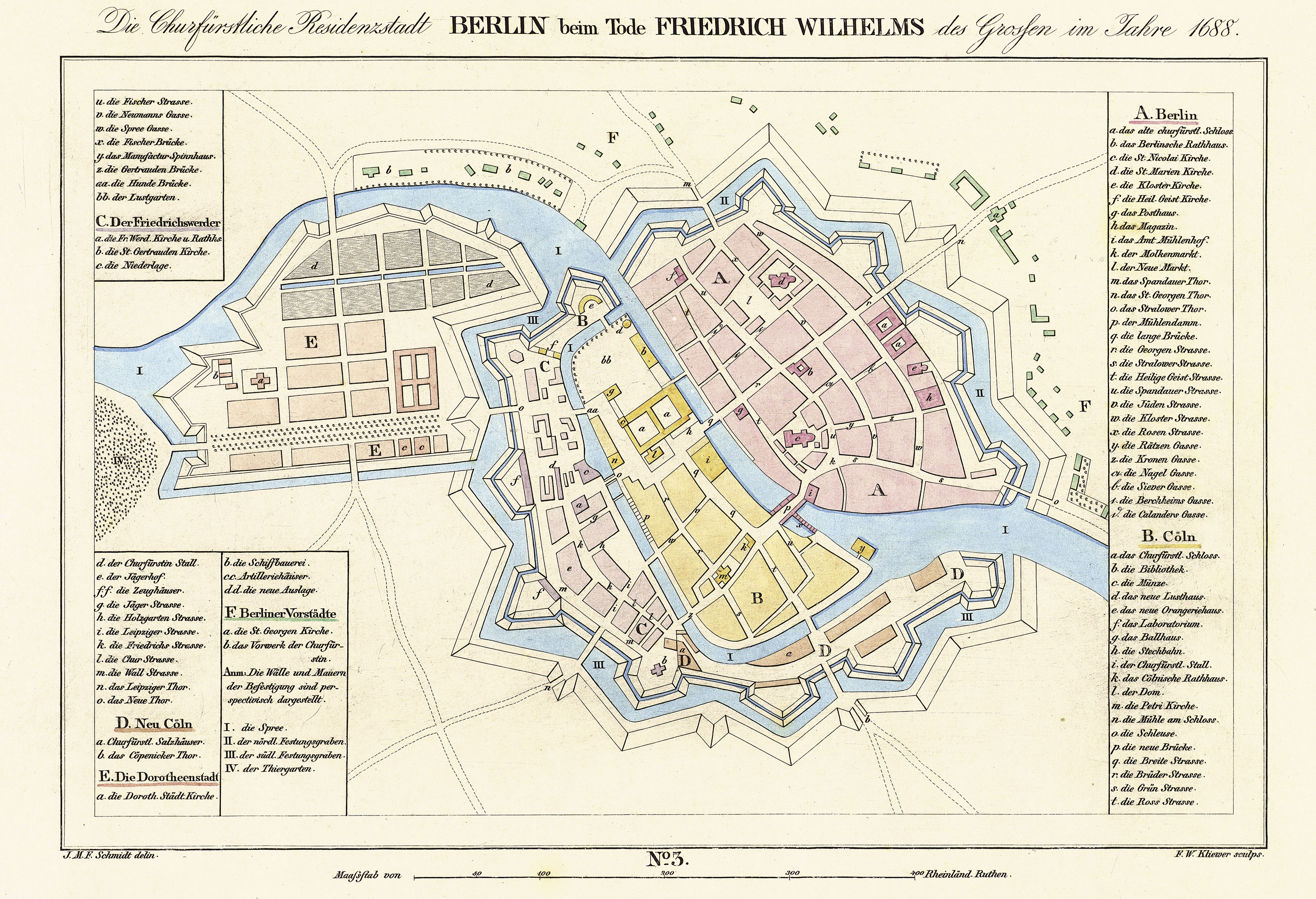
Spreeinsel (yellow) on a 1688 city plan

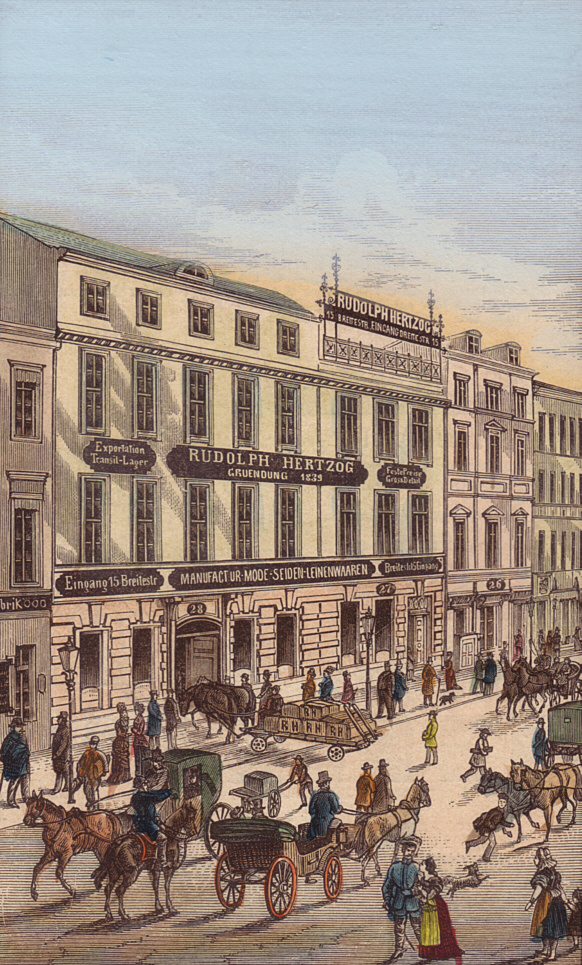
Historical Brüderstraße in the 19th century

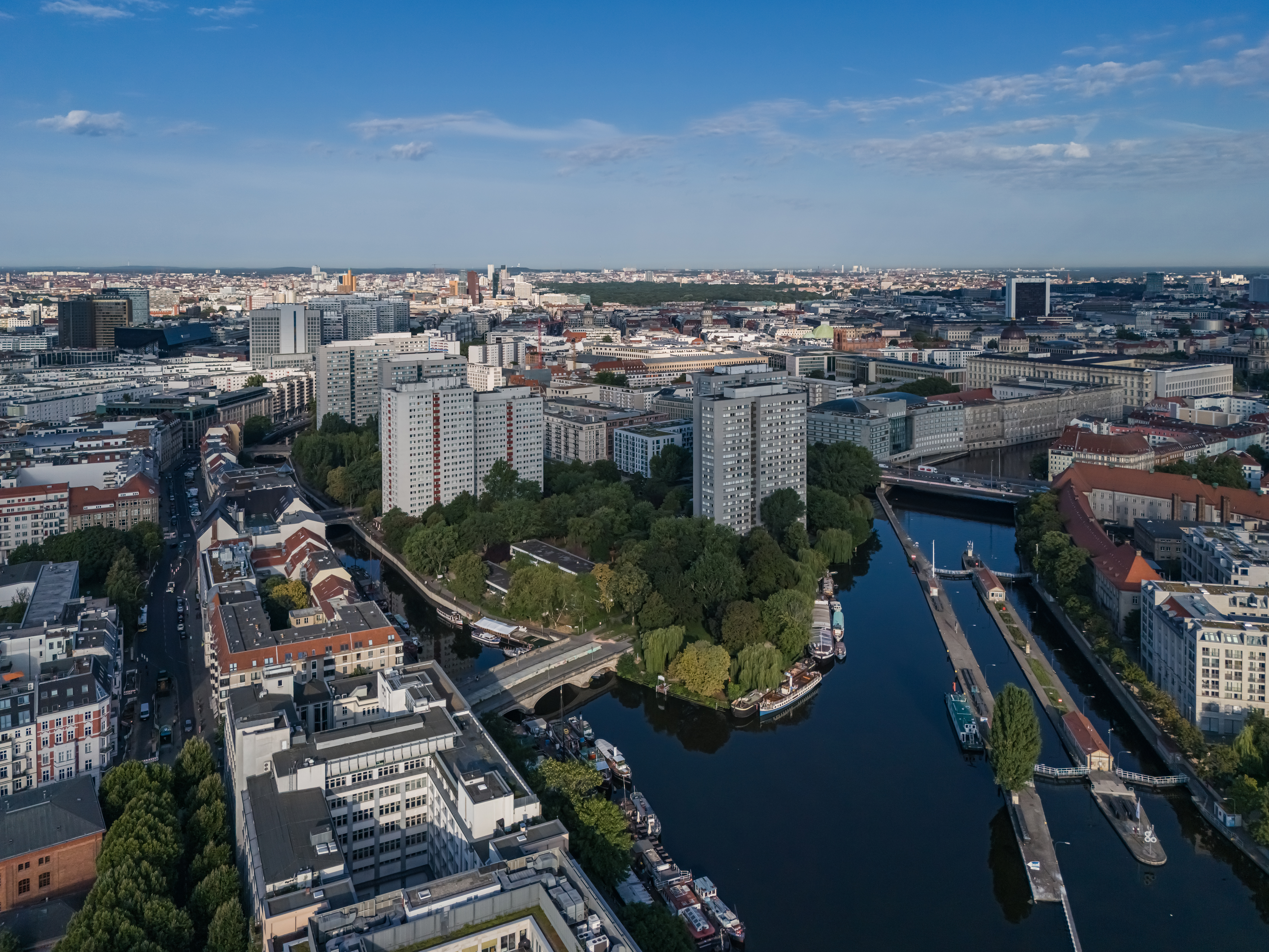
Spree Island today
