= Friedrichswerder =

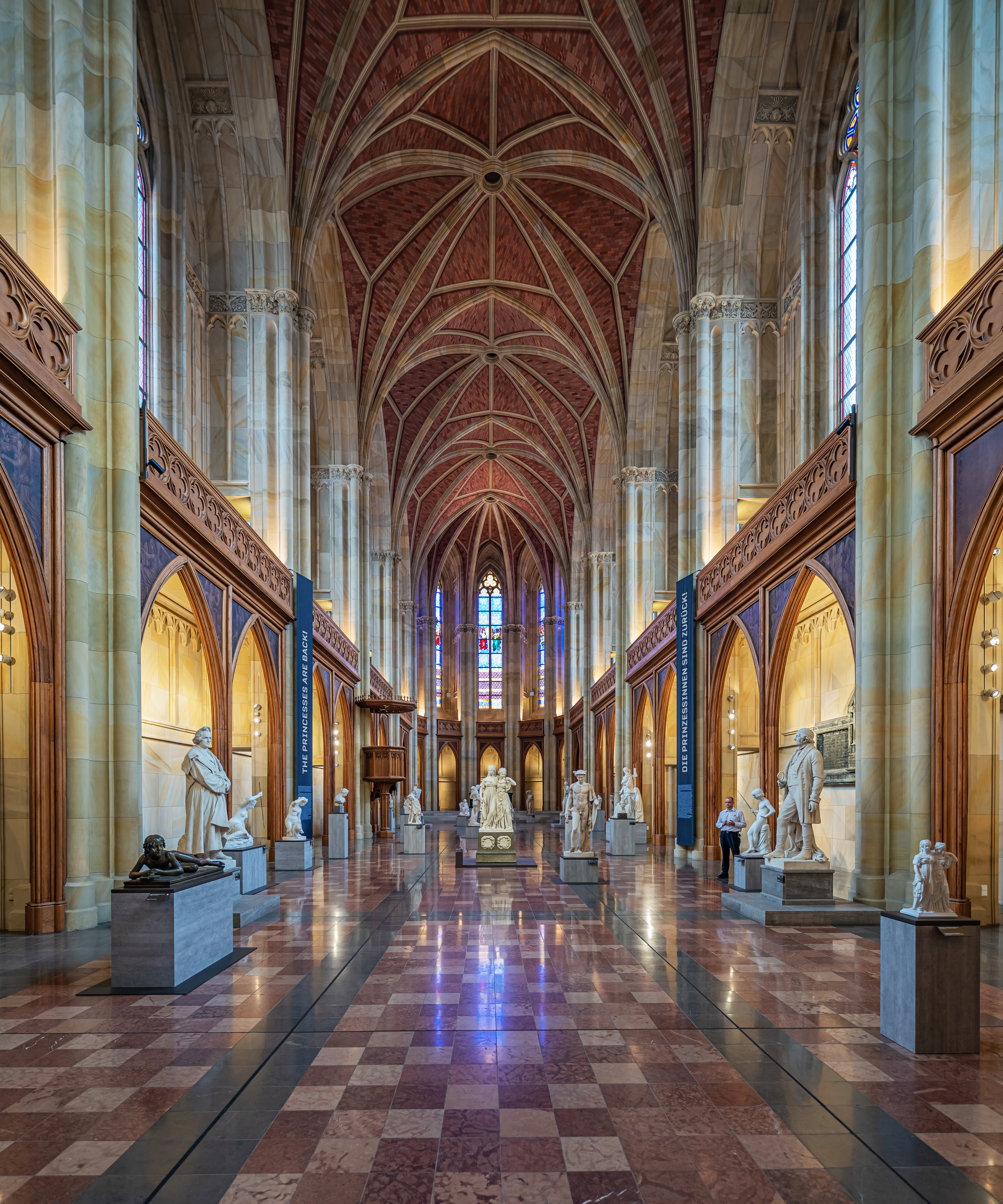
Friedrichswerder Church, Berlin - interior

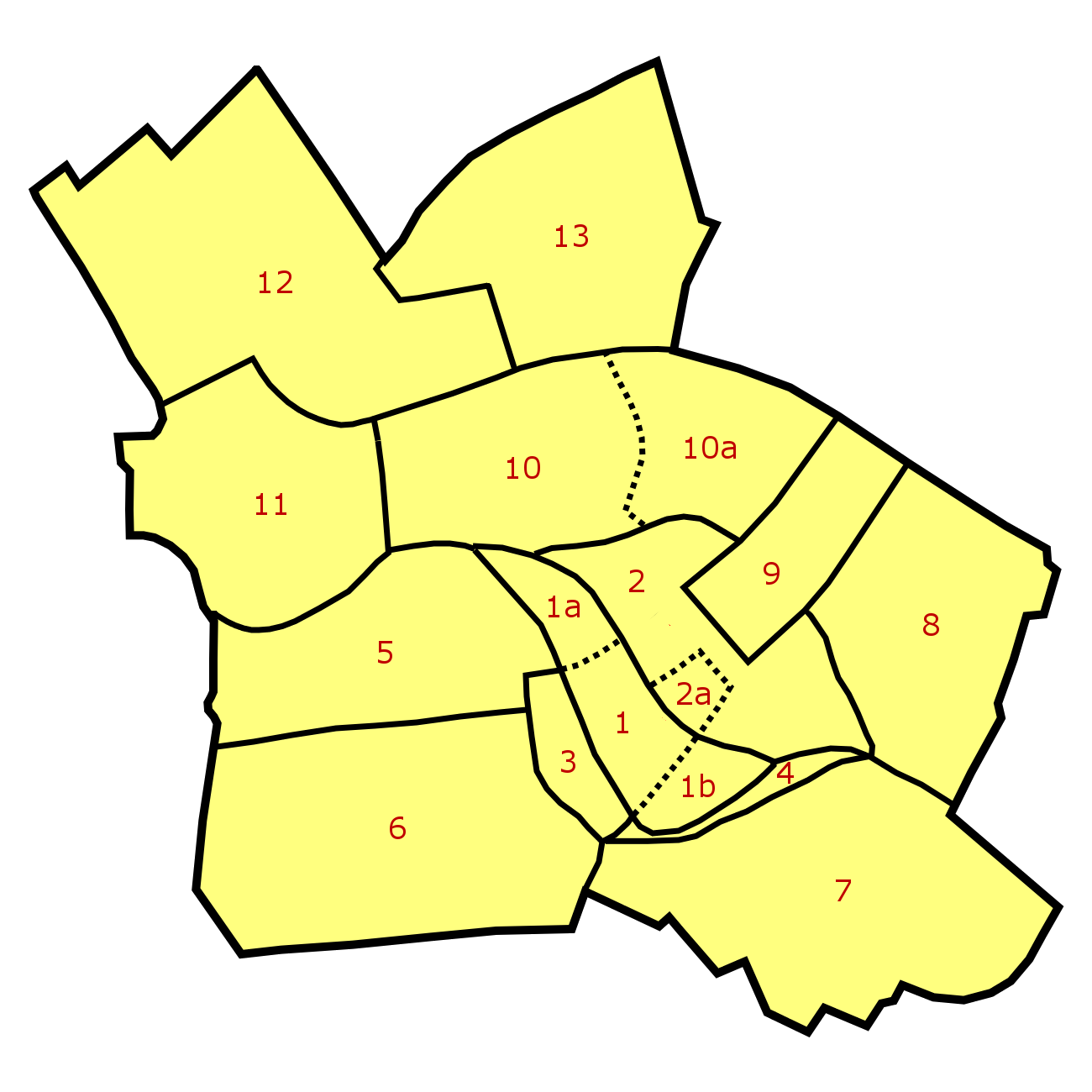
Quarters of Berlin-Mitte: Cölln (1); Museum Island (1a); Fisher Island (1b); Alt-Berlin (2); Nikolaiviertel (2a); Friedrichswerder (3); Neukölln am Wasser (4); Dorotheenstadt (5); Friedrichstadt (6); Luisenstadt (7); Stralauer Vorstadt (8); Alexanderplatz (9); Spandauer Vorstadt (10); Scheunenviertel (10a); Friedrich-Wilhelm-Stadt (11); Oranienburger Vorstadt (12); Rosenthaler Vorstadt (13)

Friedrichswerder is a neighborhood (Stadtviertel), situated in the Berliner locality (Ortsteil) of Mitte, part of the homonymous borough. It is identical to the town of Friedrichswerder, founded in 1662, which was an independent town until 1710. From 1710, Friedrichswerder belonged to the Prussian residence city of Berlin. The former town and the later district is named after Elector Friedrich Wilhelm.

== Geography ==
=== Location ===
Friedrichswerder lies between the Spreekanal and the moat, which was filled in between 1833 and 1883, the course of which can still be seen today on the property boundaries and which is characterized by the Moorish colonnades and the street on the moat. In the south the district borders on Neu-Kölln, in the west on Friedrichstadt.

The Eiserne Bridge, the Schlossbrücke, the Schleusen Bridge and the Jungfern Bridge lead to the eastern part of the Cölln district.

== Structure ==
The Friedrichswerder was divided into two quarters around 1727:

- Gertraudenviertel between Alte Leipziger Strasse and Neu-Kölln
- Schleusenviertel between Alte Leipziger Strasse and today's Dorotheenstrasse
