= Scheunenviertel =

- sub-neighborhood
- Location within Germany
- Coordinates: 52°31′34″N 13°24′36″E

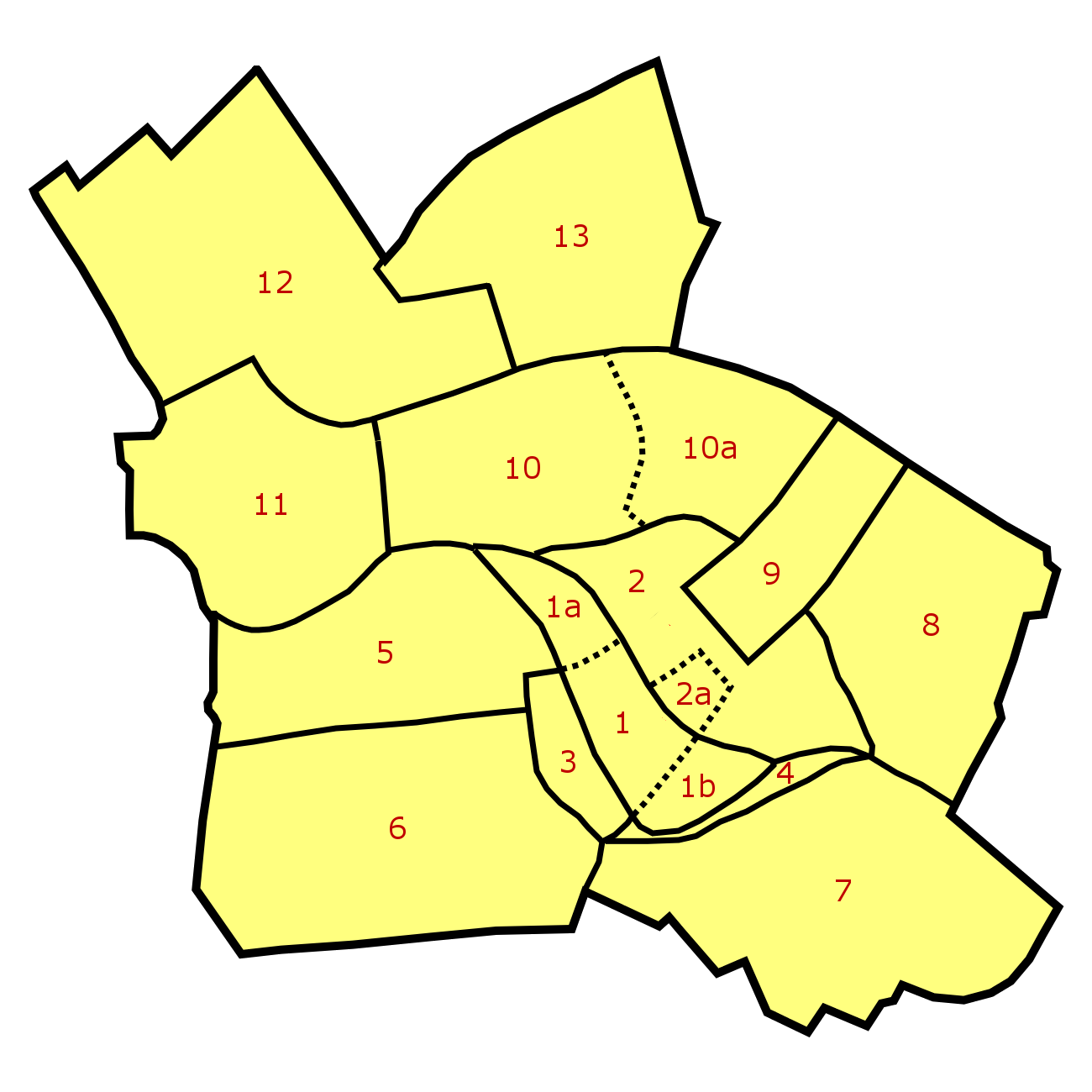
Quarters of Berlin-Mitte: Cölln (1); Museum Island (1a); Fisher Island (1b); Alt-Berlin (2); Nikolaiviertel (2a); Friedrichswerder (3); Neukölln am Wasser (4); Dorotheenstadt (5); Friedrichstadt (6); Luisenstadt (7); Stralauer Vorstadt (8); Alexanderplatz (9); Spandauer Vorstadt (10); Scheunenviertel (10a); Friedrich-Wilhelm-Stadt (11); Oranienburger Vorstadt (12); Rosenthaler Vorstadt (13)

Scheunenviertel (German: "Barn Quarter") is a neighborhood of Mitte in the centre of Berlin. It is situated to the north of the medieval Altberlin area, east of the Rosenthaler Straße and Hackescher Markt.

Until the Second World War it was regarded as a slum district and had a substantial Jewish population with a high proportion of migrants from Eastern Europe.

== History ==
The name derives from several barns erected here outside the city walls in 1672 by order of Elector Frederick William of Brandenburg. The barns were used to store hay for use at a large cattle market at nearby Alexanderplatz. In 1737 King Frederick William I of Prussia required Berlin Jews to settle here.

Prior to World War I, the Berlin City Council (Magistrat) redeveloped parts of the area. Since then the core of the neighborhood is the triangular Rosa-Luxemburg-Platz, former Bülowplatz, where on 9 August 1931 the Communist and later Stasi Executive Erich Mielke shot two police officers. Mielke fled to Moscow shortly afterwards and did not face trial for the murders until 1992.

Since German reunification the Scheunenviertel, together with the neighbouring Spandauer Vorstadt, has become a fashionable district popular with younger people.

Note that Scheunenviertel is often mistakenly used as a synonym for Berlin's Jewish quarter. Jewish cultural and commercial life was, however, centered on the neighboring Spandauer Vorstadt, where the New Synagogue and other Jewish establishments are located. The Nazis had applied the term Scheunenviertel to both of the neighborhoods in order to damage the Jewish neighborhood of Spandauer Vorstadt's reputation.

== Sights ==
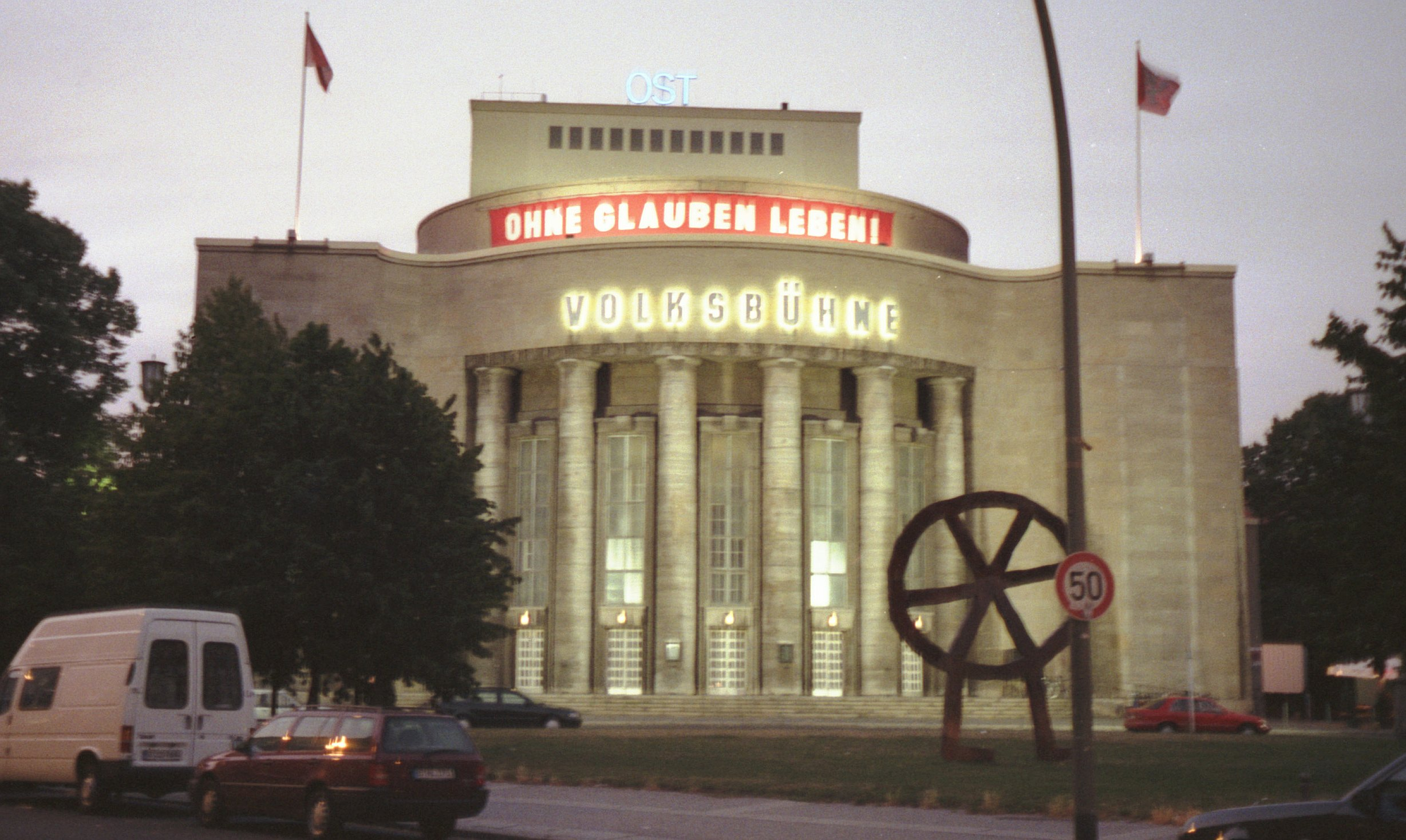
Volksbühne at Rosa-Luxemburg-Platz

- Volksbühne theatre at Rosa-Luxemburg-Platz by Oskar Kaufmann and Franz Metzner, 1914
- Karl-Liebknecht-Haus, 1912, former seat of the Central Committee of the Communist Party of Germany (Kommunistische Partei Deutschlands), now headquarters of The Left party (Die Linke)
- "Babylon" Cinema by Hans Poelzig, 1929, a location of the annual Berlin International Film Festival
- Old Garrison Cemetery (Alter Garnisonsfriedhof), dedicated about 1706, burial site of lieutenant general Ludwig Adolf Wilhelm von Lützow (1782–1834), writer Friedrich de la Motte Fouqué (1777–1843), field marshal Karl Friedrich von dem Knesebeck (1768–1848) and theologian Emil Frommel (1828–96).
- Museum of Otto Weidt's Workshop. Located in the workshop of Otto Weidt, who, as owner of the workshop, employed deaf and blind Jews during World War II. His employees were protected from deportation thanks to him. He provided them with forged IDs and hid Jewish families in his studio. The atelier, where historical documents and letters are on display, is open to visitors.

== See also ==
- History of Berlin
