= Friedrichstadt (Berlin) =

Historic neighbourhood of Berlin, Germany

- Neighborhood
- Coat of arms

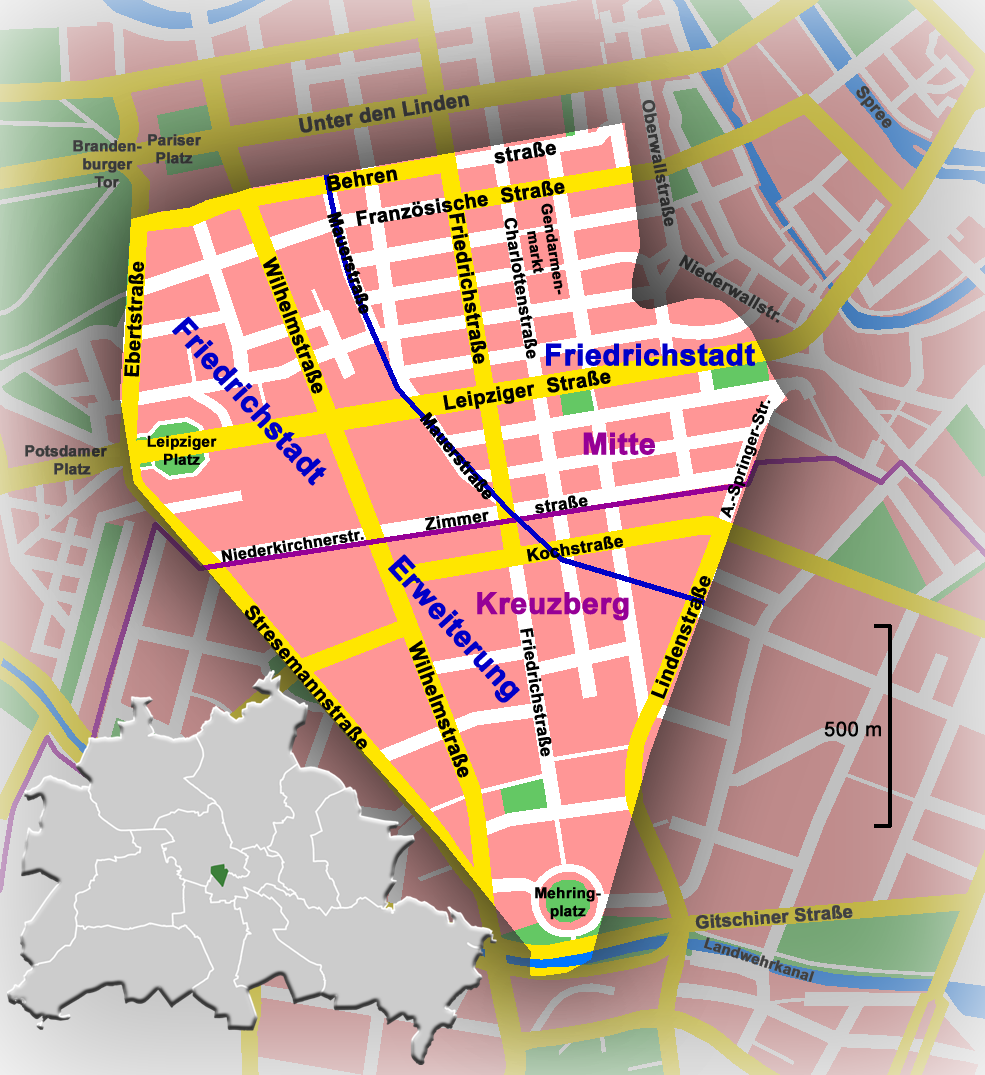
- Coordinates: 52°30′30″N 13°23′30″E
- Country: Germany
- City: Berlin
- Borough: Mitte (north) and Friedrichshain-Kreuzberg (south)
- Locality: Mitte (north) and Kreuzberg (south)

Area
  - Total: 2.1 km^{2} (0.81 sq mi)
- Elevation: 34 m (112 ft)

Population (1725)
  - Total: 12,144

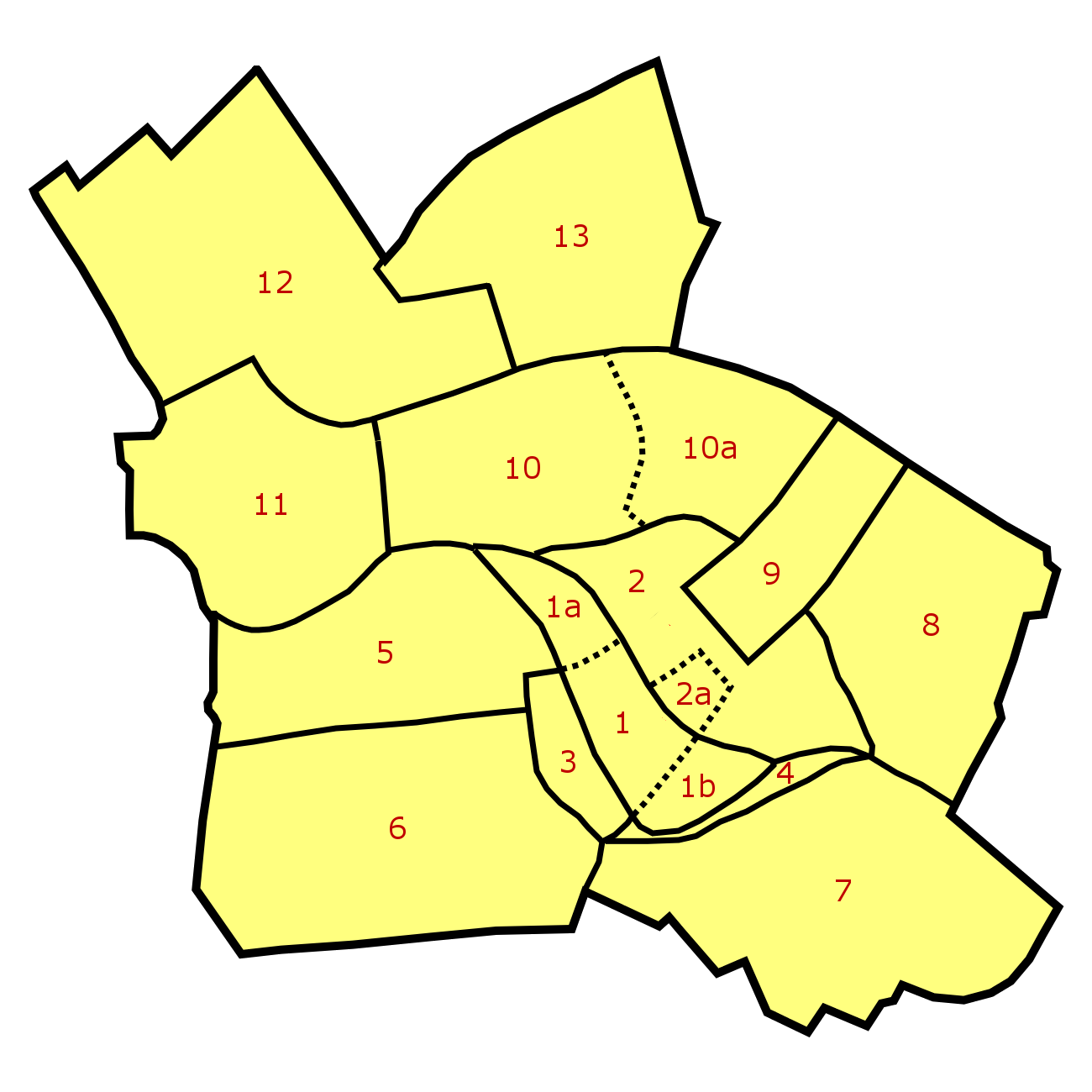
Quarters of Berlin-Mitte: Cölln (1); Museum Island (1a); Fisher Island (1b); Alt-Berlin (2); Nikolaiviertel (2a); Friedrichswerder (3); Neukölln am Wasser (4); Dorotheenstadt (5); Friedrichstadt (6); Luisenstadt (7); Stralauer Vorstadt (8); Alexanderplatz (9); Spandauer Vorstadt (10); Scheunenviertel (10a); Friedrich-Wilhelm-Stadt (11); Oranienburger Vorstadt (12); Rosenthaler Vorstadt (13)

Friedrichstadt (German pronunciation: [ˈfʁiːdʁɪçˌʃtat]) was an independent suburb of Berlin, and is now a historical neighbourhood of the city itself. The neighbourhood is named after the Prussian king Frederick I, who founded it in 1691 as the third expansion of the Berlin-Cölln city centre, after Dorotheenstadt and Friedrichswerder. The neighbourhood is located in central Berlin, with its northern part in the borough of Berlin-Mitte and its southern part in Friedrichshain-Kreuzberg. It was designed with broad streets intersecting at right angles, and quickly attracted Huguenot settlers fleeing persecution in France.

By 1725 it counted 12,144 residents. In 1709, a royal decree incorporated Friedrichstadt into the newly unified "Royal Residence and Capital City of Berlin," ending its independence. Friedrichstadt was severely damaged during World War II, particularly during the Allied bombing on 3 February 1945, and further disrupted by the construction of the Berlin Wall through the neighbourhood. Reconstruction efforts intensified after German reunification, restoring much of the area's historical character. Today, Friedrichstadt is home to several notable landmarks, including the Gendarmenmarkt, the Memorial to the Murdered Jews of Europe, and Checkpoint Charlie. The neighbourhood also serves as a major centre of government, hosting seven federal ministries, numerous state liaison offices, and foreign embassies.

== Geography ==
Friedrichstadt is located south of the Dorotheenstadt neighbourhood, and southwest of the historical suburb of Friedrichswerder. It is located south of the twin-city zone of Berlin and Cölln. Today, the northern part of the neighbourhood is located in the borough of Berlin-Mitte, while the southern part of the neighbourhood is located in borough of Friedrichshain-Kreuzberg. The border between the two boroughs runs along the southern side of Niederkirchnerstraße and Zimmerstraße.

The official boundaries of Friedrichstadt extend from the Spittelmarkt starting between northbound streets Niederwall- and Oberwallstraße, along Behrenstraße west to Ebertstraße, and then south over the Potsdamer Platz, Stresemann- and Gitschiner Straße, ending at the Hallesches Tor, and then again north over Linden- and Axel-Springer-Straße, back to the Spittelmarkt. A large portion of the Spittelmarkt and adjoining Hausvogteiplatz were once part of a military installation associated with the historical suburb of Friedrichswerder.

== History ==
An early drawing of the Friedrichstadt street layout.

After the death of prince-elector Frederick William of Brandenburg in 1688, his son, prince-elector Friedrich III, later king Frederick I of Prussia, was allowed to establish a new city on the outskirts of Cölln, one of the precursor cities of modern-day Berlin. In order to assist with the street layout and the placement of buildings and houses, various architects and engineers, including Johann Nering, Johann Behr, and Martin Grünberg were called in. The new city was founded in 1691. Friedrichstadt was the third expansion of the Berlin-Cölln city center, after Dorotheenstadt and Friedrichswerder. Friedrichstadt was built outside of Berlin's fortifications, south of Dorotheenstadt and west of Friedrichswerder. However, the city was protected both by the militia of Leipzig and a lengthening of the western city wall of Dorotheenstadt. Today, this is the site of Mauerstraße (English: Wall Street). Toward the south, Friedrichstadt originally extended to the present-day Zimmerstraße. From that southern point, the city extended approximately to the fortifications of the city of Neu-Cölln. To enter the city from Friedrichswerder, one entered through the Leipziger Tor (English: Leipzig Gate), and to enter from Dorotheenstadt, one came through the Friedrichs-Tor. This new area of the city, however, was not referred to as Friedrichstadt until 1706, fifteen years after its founding.

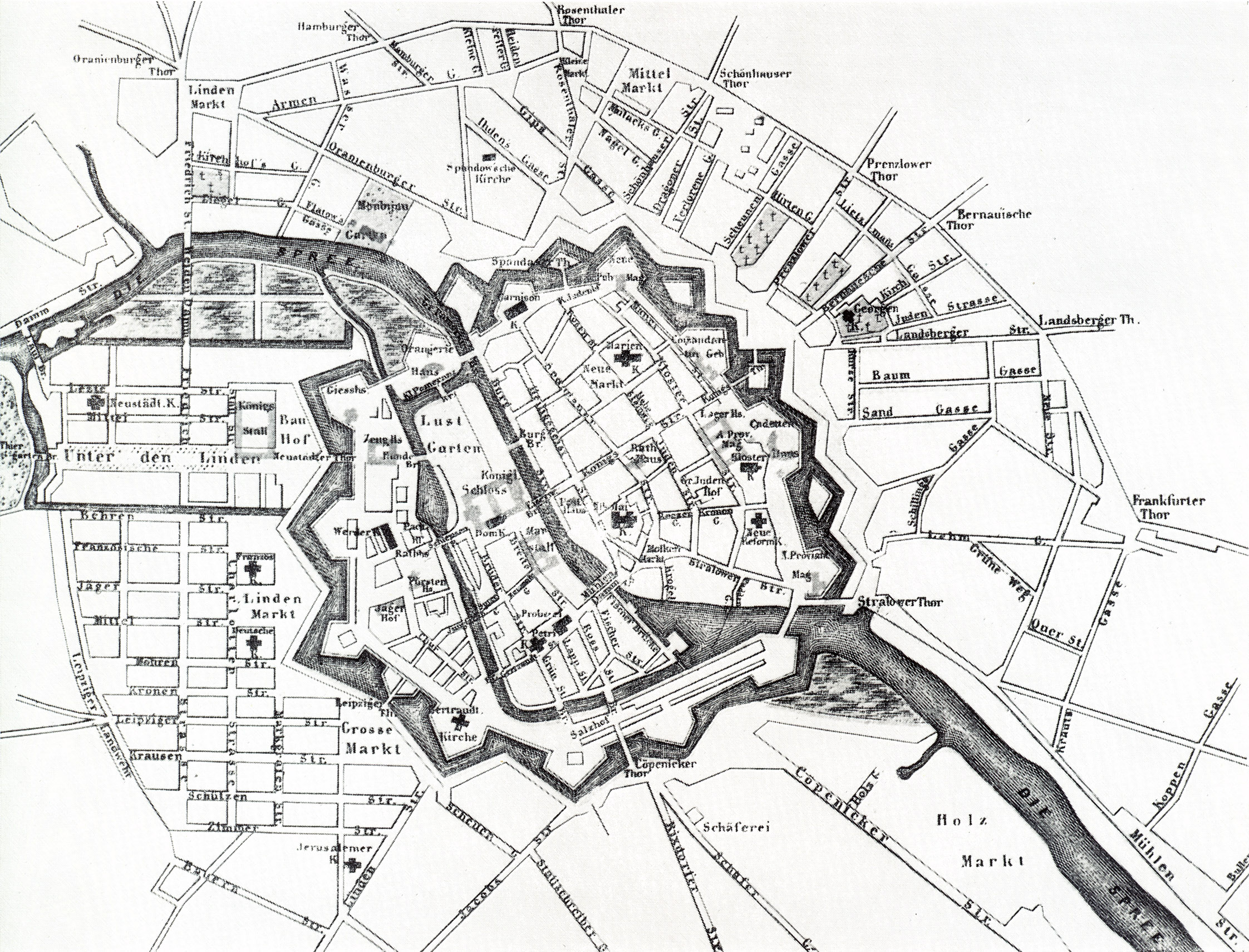
A map of Berlin in 1710. Friedrichstadt appears in the lower left

Friedrichstadt was designed with an unusually austere geometric style for the time, with broad streets which intersected at right angles to each other. Because the ground upon which the new neighbourhood was to be built was boggy and unstable, many houses in the city had to be built on stilts and stakes. As a result of government sponsored building rush, 300 houses stood in Friedrichstadt in 1692, just one year after its founding. Many settlers in the city were Huguenots seeking refuge from the French government. Jerusalem's Chapel, which used to stand outside of the built-up area before, was included into Friedrichstadt's municipal borders and became its first parish church. In 1689 and 1693–1695 Giovanni Simonetti restored and extended the chapel to become Jerusalem's Church, which was continuously staffed with a Calvinist and a Lutheran preacher from 1694 on, thus becoming a simultaneum. In 1701 the Judge Krause at the neighboured Kammergericht (then Supreme Court of Brandenburg) added a sepulchre chapel for his family to the church building. To accommodate more German and French settlers, ground was broken on the constructions of two large churches, the French Church of Friedrichstadt, and the German New Church, in 1701. Construction of new homes continued in the city until 1708. In 1711 at the corner of Jäger and Markgrafen streets a new building for the "Societät der Wissenschaften" (English: Society of the Sciences), founded by Gottfried Leibniz, opened. Today the building is occupied by the Berlin-Brandenburg Academy of Sciences and Humanities, which is the third oldest scientific academy in Europe.

Through a royal decree issued by king Frederick I on January 18, 1709 Friedrichstadt, along with the cities of Berlin, Cölln, Friedrichswerder, and Dorotheenstadt were to be consolidated into the "Königliche Haupt- und Residenzstadt Berlin" (English: Royal Residence and Capital City of Berlin), effective January 1, 1710. With that, the independence of Friedrichstadt ended, as it was incorporated as a part of the new Berlin.

King Frederick William I observes construction in Friedrichstadt, background: Trinity Church.

After Frederick I's son, Frederick William I became king, he allowed Berlin, and the Friedrichstadt neighbourhood, to grow considerably. In the 1720s, a new fortified wall was to be constructed. The main construction of the wall took place between 1734 and 1736, however. During this time, a large portion of the military protections between the Friedrichswerder and Friedrichstadt neighbourhoods was removed. The Friedrichstadt neighbourhood was allowed to expand as far as the new fortified security wall. A large proportion of the new residents of the neighbourhood were Huguenots, who continued to be persecuted for their beliefs in France.

By 1725, the neighbourhood comprised 700 houses and counted 12,144 residents. In addition, the neighbourhood was home to 85 taverns and 114 distilleries. The actual houses were usually two stories in height, built in the usual Baroque urban style of the day, but also with a harsh regularity. The houses were built with the long side, never the gable, toward the street. This was because the amount of assistance granted by the government for the construction of houses was based on the length of the front of the house. Because of this, the houses had large gardens in back. With the encouragement of the king, old and unsightly homes were torn down. However, other high authorities wished more homes to be built in the area, to accommodate soldiers and extra French Huguenot refugees, and lots for homes were given away. Along Koch Street, guild halls and tradesmens’ unions were constructed. The construction of a large manor in a neighbourhood could give it a large boost, but the rejection or absence of such plans could result in economic disaster. Friedrichstadt fared favorably, when a French baron, François Mathieu Vernezobre de Laurieux, built a large palace on Wilhelm Street because of the marriage of his daughter to a local army captain. In 1735 the Marcher Consistory, the Kammergericht and all the other supreme courts of the different territories ruled in personal union by the Hohenzollern moved into the new so-called Collegienhaus, without formally merging the different juridical systems. In 1913 the Kammergericht (meanwhile having incorporated the other courts) moved into a new edifice and the Collegienhaus was exclusively used by the Consistory (then competent for Berlin and Brandenburg, the predecessor of today's Evangelical Church of Berlin-Brandenburg-Silesian Upper Lusatia). After its destruction in the Allied bombing of Berlin in World War II on 3 February 1945 the ruins were reconstructed to house the Berlin Museum. The Collegienhaus is one of the few still existing baroque structures in Friedrichstadt and is now part of the Jewish Museum Berlin.

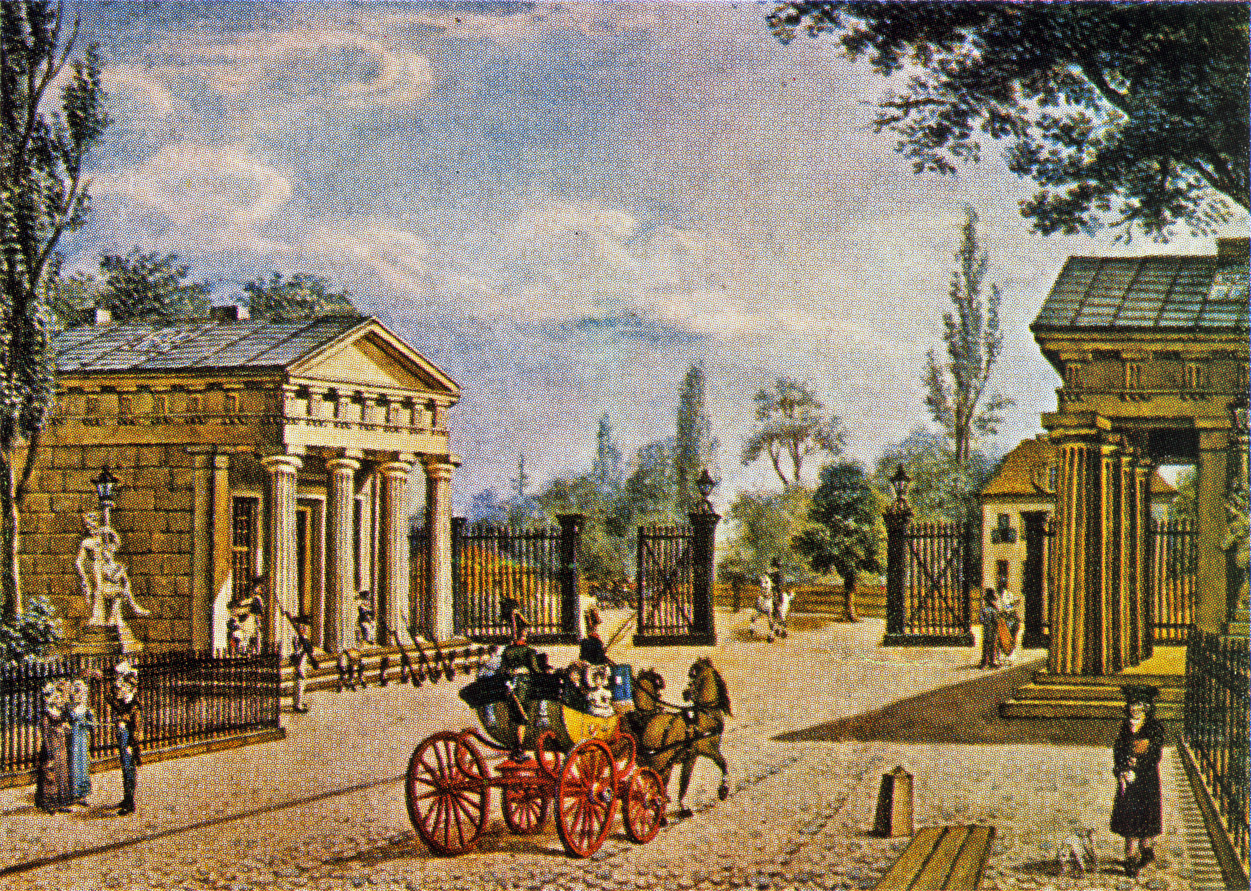
The Potsdamer Tor, c. 1820.

The neighbourhood contained two markets, the Mittelmarkt, now called the Gendarmenmarkt, and the Dönhoffplatz, which is located near the former fortress. Within the neighbourhood, Leipziger Straße, site of the Dönhoffplatz, and Friedrichstraße developed into the neighbourhood’s main streets. Between 1725 and 1737 another 1,000 houses were built in the neighbourhood. However, as the neighbourhood grew, three other open areas remained at the edges of the neighbourhood. As the construction of the neighbourhood continued, the open areas became more and more important. The main director of construction in the neighbourhood, Philipp Gerlach, developed these open areas into important city plazas, and they were originally named the Wilhelms-Markt, the Achteck am Potsdamer Thor, and the Rondell. The Wilhelms-Markt is so named because it is located on Wilhelmstraße. The plaza is square, and planted with linden trees. Each corner of the square plaza contains a large marble statue of a famous Prussian general. The four generals honored in the plaza are Kurt Christoph Graf von Schwerin, Hans Karl von Winterfeldt, Friedrich Wilhelm von Seydlitz, and Francis Edward James Keith. The Achteck am Potsdamer Thor was renamed the Leipzigplatz (now Leipziger Platz) in 1814 for the Battle of Leipzig, and as its German names implies, the plaza has eight corners. The Rondell is a round plaza, and was subsequently renamed twice. It was renamed the Belle-Alliance-Platz in 1815 (named after La Belle Alliance and used as an alternative name for the Battle of Waterloo), and the Mehringplatz, after Franz Mehring, in 1947.

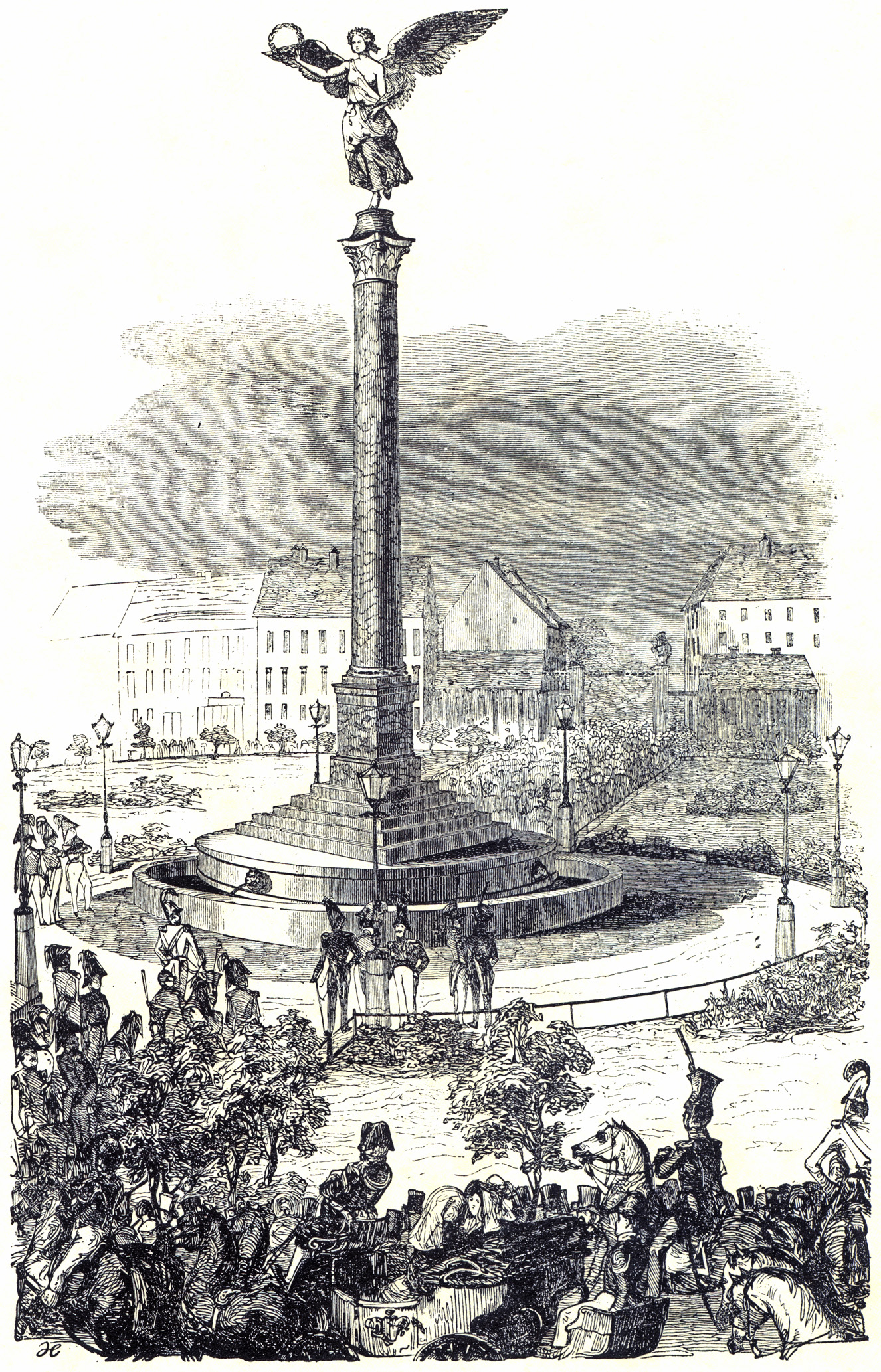
The Peace Column in Belle-Alliance-Platz.

The Gendarmenmarkt, Friedrichstadt's main plaza, experienced many changes toward the end of the 18th century. Between 1774 and 1776, a small French theater house was built, which was later christened the Nationaltheater as the establishment came to the forefront in German theater. Also, between 1780 and 1785, the French and German churches on the plaza built distinctive cupolaed towers on top of their churches, leading to the two being known as the Deutscher Dom and the Französischer Dom (English: German and French Cathedrals, respectively) to the present day. In 1800, the Nationaltheater was replaced with a larger theater, the Schauspielhaus (English: Play House), whose architecture had to be designed to compete with the new cupola towers on the Gendarmenmarkt's twin churches. However, public reaction to the new theater's design was negative, and many people called the Carl Gotthard Langhans-designed building the "Koffer" (English: Trunk or suitcase). Luckily for dissatisfied Berliners, the Schauspielhaus burnt to the ground in 1817 and a new theater, designed by Karl Friedrich Schinkel, was built in its place. In 1843, after 25 years of peace in Prussia, a monument to this achievement, the Friedenssäule (English: Peace Column) was built in the then Belle-Alliance-Platz.

The fortified walls which surrounded greater Berlin became a hindrance to traffic, which was becoming consistently busier and more uncontrolled. Although the walls had been constructed for the purposes of keeping invaders out, and stopping smuggling and deserters, the walls had become an increasing nuisance. Extra gates were deemed necessary. Another gate, the third for the Friedrichstadt neighbourhood, was built in 1839, and opened in 1840.

The writer Max Osborn captures a picture of the economic development of Leipzig Street, and of Friedrichstadt as a whole during the 1870s in one of his memoirs:

"The center of commercial life in Friedrichstadt was in its shops and offices, but these were somewhat sparse. Linden trees slowly filled the gaps between businesses which had been open for decades, before Leipzig Street had asserted its importance...

Leipzig Street had a lot of potential, but when it just began, it differed greatly from our current perceptions of a great shopping street. There was no talk of the strings of closed and failed businesses which would occur; there were large gaps in the stores along the streets. However, even then the street was not defeated, its character remained. There were still many respectable middle-class families who lived comfortably in the upper stories of the buildings. In great numbers, they changed the pleasure gardens in the backs of the houses into vegetable gardens, and opened these to the public as inns and other such establishments, where one could sit under tall, old trees.

The neighbourhood's traffic played out over the pavement in patterns we no longer know. Leipzig Street was not the only place people went in the neighbourhood for shopping of peace of mind ... However, the conquest of Leipzig Street came in phases. While its eastern section was being besieged by the hordes of shoppers, its western sections remained calm."

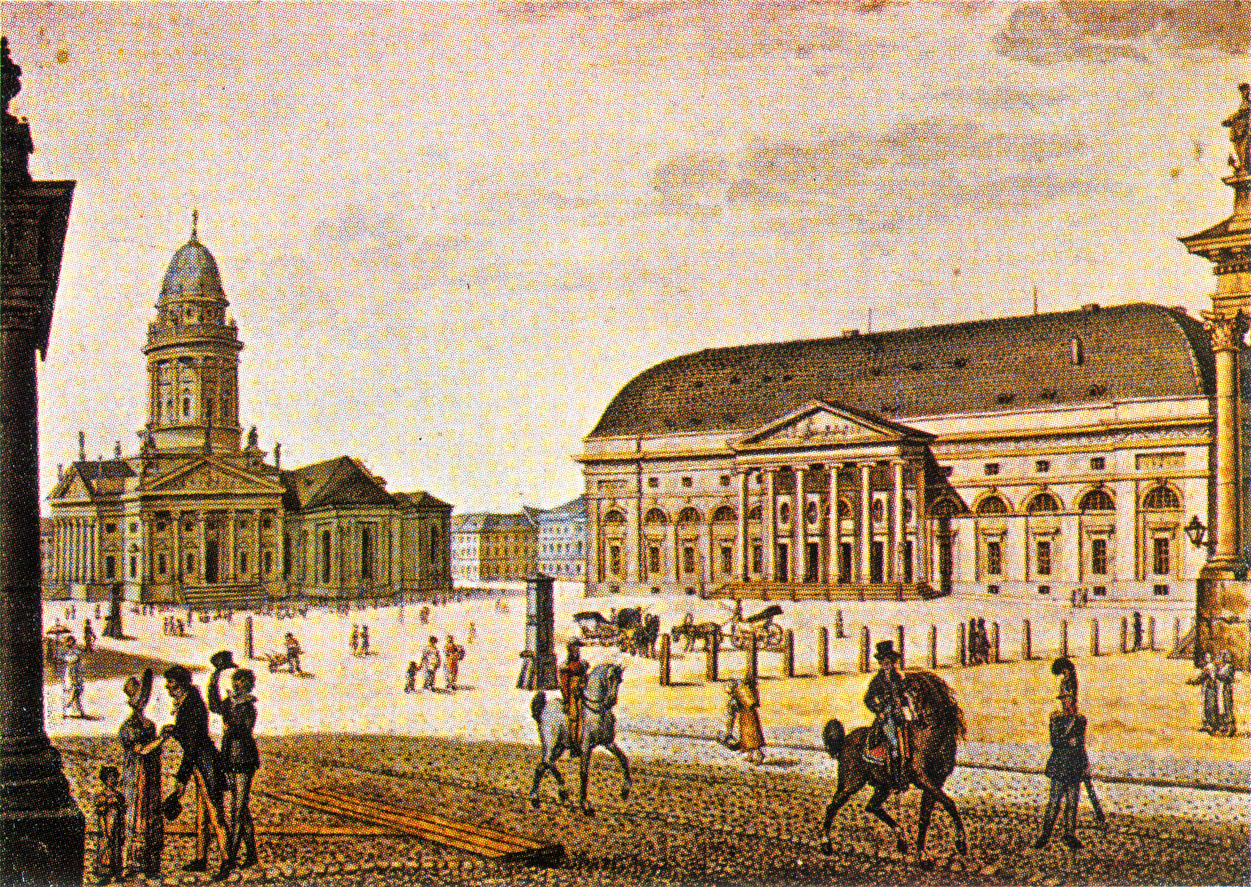
The Gendarmenmarkt as it appeared in 1815.

Friedrichstraße, named after King Frederick I, the founder of Friedrichstadt, including the section in the Dorotheenstadt neighbourhood, is 3.3 km (2.1 mi) in length. It was the first shopping and amusement street in Berlin, and was a major artery in the road network. The street was so large that the royal army used it as a venue to practice marching, due to its length and width.

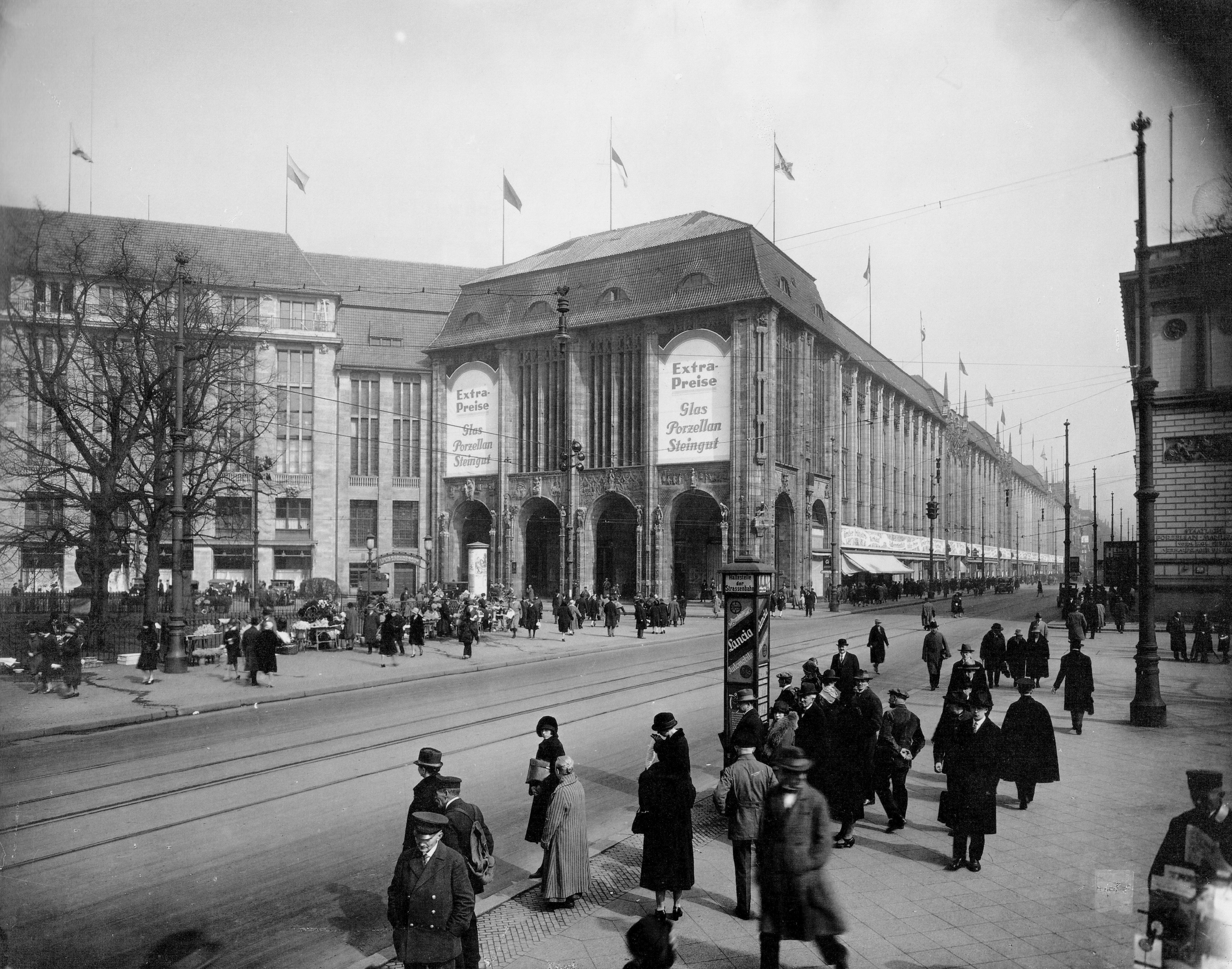
The Wertheim department store.

On the western side of the neighbourhood, along the parallel-running Wilhelmstrasse, which was named after the crown prince, later king Frederick William, many government offices were constructed, and many government employees lived nearby. In 1896 on the Leipziger Platz, the Wertheim department store was built. It was at the time the largest department store in Europe. Although the store was destroyed in World War II, its size has been exceeded only by Harrods in London.

Friedrichstadt was severely damaged in the widespread destruction which accompanied World War II, especially in the first area bombardment organised and carried out by the United States Air Force on the morning of February 3, 1945. The bombs consisted mostly of inflammables, hardly explosives. The bombing was so dense that it caused a city fire spreading eastwards, driven by the wind, over the centre and south of Friedrichstadt and the northwest of neighboured Luisenstadt. The fire lasted for four days until it had burnt everything combustible in its range to ashes and after it had reached waterways, and large thoroughfares, parks and the like over which the fire could not jump any further. The death-toll amounted to 2,894 (although this official number is somewhat dubious, for the Nazis always underscored the number of dead to hide their inability to protect the domestic population), whereas the US estimated to have killed some 20,000. The number of wounded amounted to 20,000 and 120,000 lost their homes. Fortunately due to the exhaustion of German supplies the German anti-aircraft defense was underequipped and weak so that out of the 1,600 US aircraft only 36 were shot down and their crews, as far as they survived the crash of their planes, taken prisoner of war.

Many of the historic buildings in the neighbourhood were so badly damaged that they had to be condemned or torn down. The construction of the Berlin Wall directly through the neighbourhood brought only more destruction. In the northern portion of the neighbourhood, which lay within the boundaries of Mitte Borough, which was part of East Berlin, systematic rebuilding began in 1970. Leipzig Street had been almost completely flattened.

== Reconstruction ==
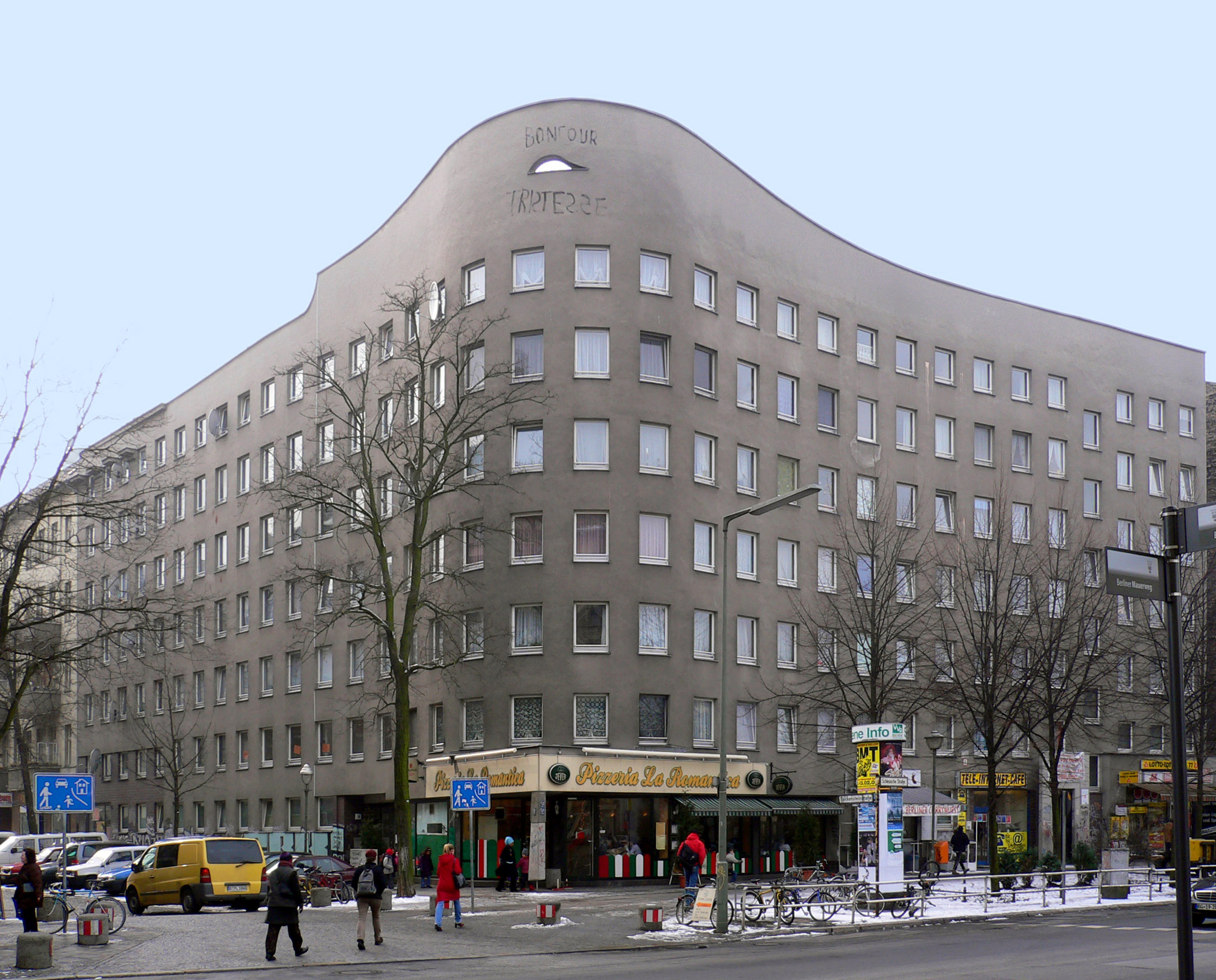
Bonjour tristesse apartment building by Alvaro Siza

In the 1970s Friedrichstadt was little more than wasteland near the Berlin Wall with few crumbling 19th century tenements buildings. In 1979 the West Berlin Councilman for Housing and Construction Harry Ristock initiated preparations for the International Building Exhibition Berlin (IBA). Southern Friedrichstadt became the main focus for inner-city regeneration. Prominent international architects joined urban planners.

After the German reunification, a more comprehensive reconstruction effort was made in the neighbourhood, with the goal of restoring the neighbourhood to its former prominence. Many new and luxurious buildings were built with attention to historical styles. Many new businesses, including several high-end department stores and shops opened in the neighbourhood. Gradually the Friedrichstadt neighbourhood is restoring its famous pre-war charm.

== Points of interest ==
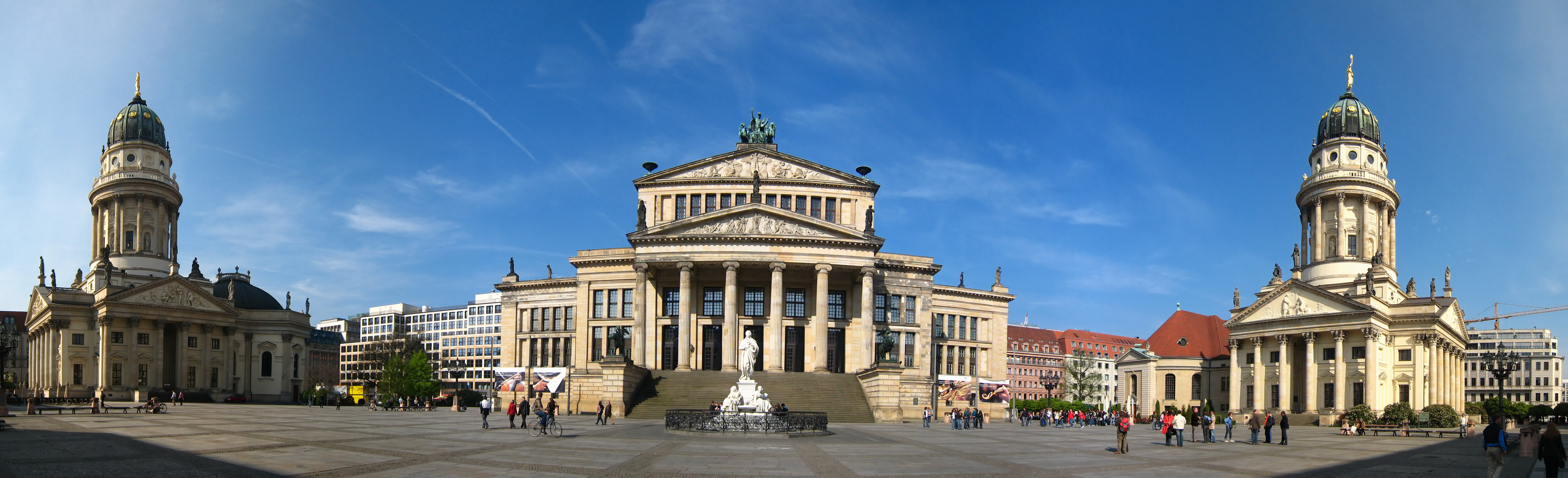
A panorama of the Gendarmenmarkt, including the theater and both churches.

The Gendarmenmarkt is considered to be among the most beautiful plazas in all of Europe. In the middle of the plaza is a major theater, flanked by two important churches, the Deutscher and Französischer Dom (English: German and French cathedrals). Many new buildings have been constructed in the area as well. Due to the destruction from World War II, the oldest surviving building on the Gendarmenmarkt is the former Prussian State Bank, built in 1901. Other buildings on the square have been carefully reconstructed. The German and French cathedrals were built from 1701 to 1708, and the cupolaed towers were added by each church at the same time, over 100 years later. Between these, the twice-destroyed Konzerthaus now seats 1,850.

Because Berlin is an independent city-state within Germany, Berlin has its own parliament at the state level. Berlin's Prussian parliament building, now housing the House of Representatives of Berlin, is located in Friedrichstadt, along Niederkirchnerstraße. The building has been in use since 1899, when the Prussian House of Commons used it. The neighbourhood is also host to the Memorial to the Murdered Jews of Europe, a large and sometimes controversial monument located one block south of the Brandenburg Gate. It is located in the northwest corner of the neighbourhood. Another famous landmark in Friedrichstadt is Checkpoint Charlie, the most infamous border crossing between East and West Berlin between 1945 and 1990.

== Government buildings ==
Because of Friedrichstadt central location within Berlin, many government ministries and offices have their headquarters in the Friedrichstadt neighbourhood. Although many ministries occupy older buildings, many are opting for newer, more modern headquarters, and new construction to accommodate these departments is not uncommon. Seven government ministries have their headquarters in the neighbourhood, including the ministries of Finance, Scientific Research and Development, Family Services, Seniors', Women's, and Children's Services, Health, Justice, and Housing.

Many of the German federal states have their liaison offices to the federal government in Friedrichstadt as well, including the states of Bavaria, Brandenburg, Hamburg, Hesse, Mecklenburg-Vorpommern, Lower Saxony, Rhineland-Palatinate, Saarland, Schleswig-Holstein, and Thuringia.

In addition to this, many foreign countries also have their embassies in the neighbourhood. These countries are: Australia, Belgium, Bulgaria, Brunei, Canada, Chile, the Czech Republic, Greece, Ireland, Kenya, Libya, Morocco, Myanmar, New Zealand, North Korea, Portugal, Singapore, Slovenia, and South Africa.

In addition to all of this, one of Germany's major political parties, the Social Democratic Party, has its national headquarters at the southern end of this neighbourhood.
