= Dorotheenstadt =

Historic zone or neighbourhood of central Berlin, Germany

Coordinates: 52°31′13″N 13°23′0″E

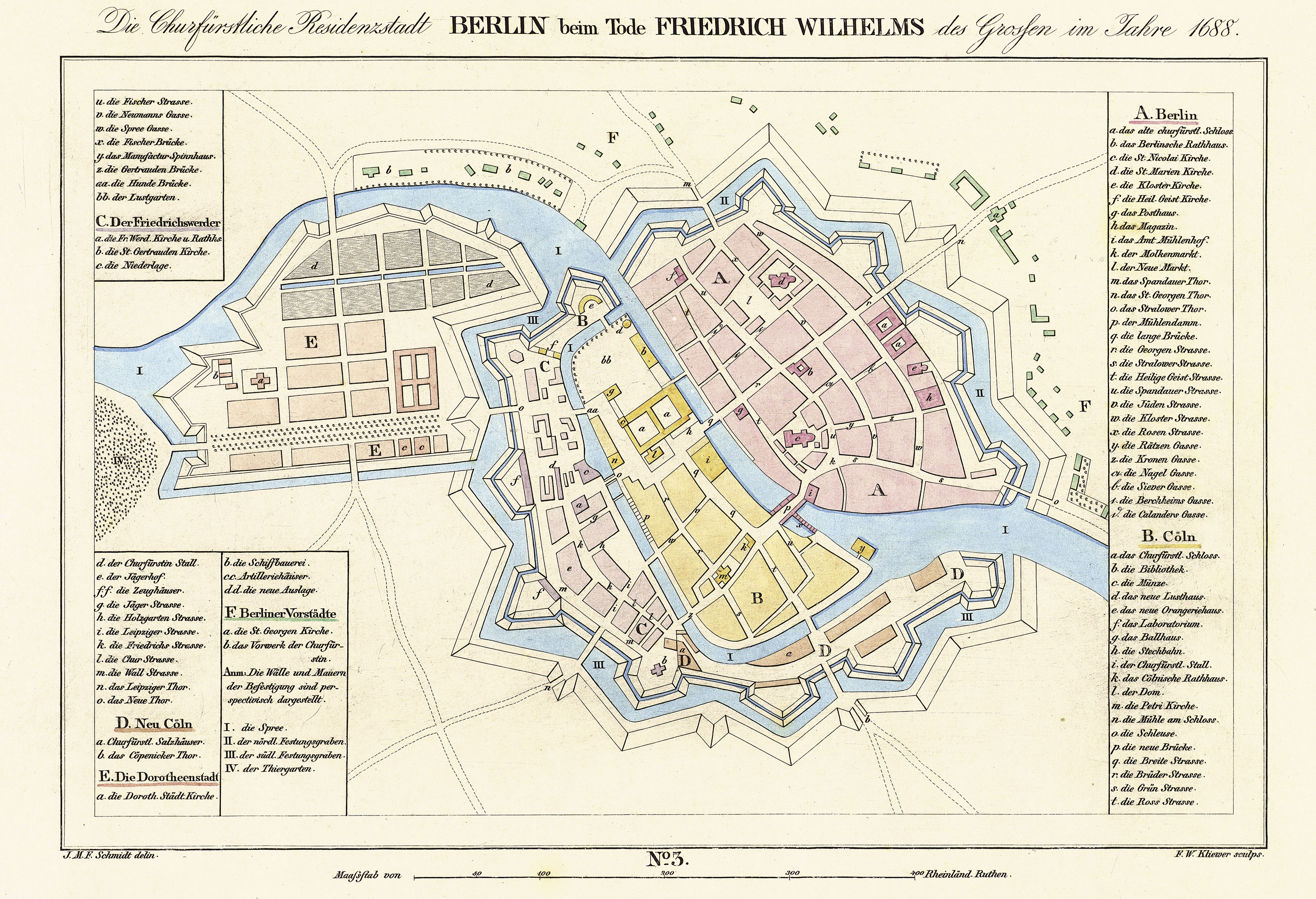
Dorotheenstadt (E) within Berlin in 1688

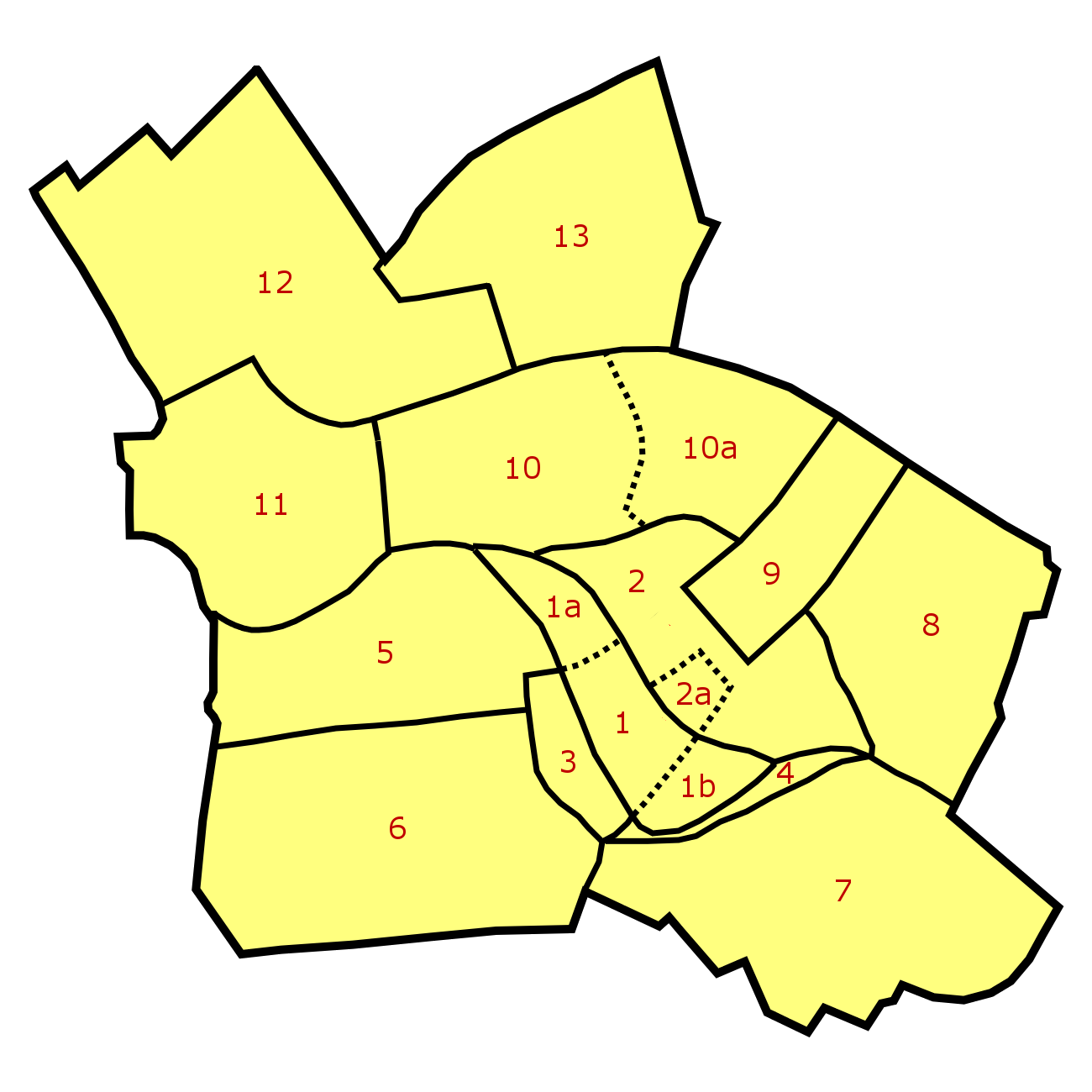
Quarters of Berlin-Mitte: Cölln (1); Museum Island (1a); Fisher Island (1b); Alt-Berlin (2); Nikolaiviertel (2a); Friedrichswerder (3); Neukölln am Wasser (4); Dorotheenstadt (5); Friedrichstadt (6); Luisenstadt (7); Stralauer Vorstadt (8); Alexanderplatz (9); Spandauer Vorstadt (10); Scheunenviertel (10a); Friedrich-Wilhelm-Stadt (11); Oranienburger Vorstadt (12); Rosenthaler Vorstadt (13)

Dorotheenstadt is a historic zone or neighbourhood (Stadtviertel) of central Berlin, Germany, which forms part of the locality (Ortsteil) of Mitte within the borough (Bezirk) also called Mitte. It contains several famous Berlin landmarks: the Brandenburg Gate, the Pariser Platz, and Unter den Linden.

== Location ==
Dorotheenstadt is bordered in the west by the Großer Tiergarten, in the north by the River Spree, in the northeast by the Kupfergraben (part of the Spree canal system), in the east by Hinter dem Gießhaus and Oberwallstraße and in the south by the Behrenstraße.

== History ==
In 1670, the "Great Elector" Frederick William made a gift to his second wife, Sophie Dorothea of Schleswig-Holstein-Sonderburg-Glücksburg, of the Cölln estate of Tiergarten, located between the wall surrounding Berlin and the Großer Tiergarten. A new settlement, initially called Neustadt (New Town), was laid out according to a strict rectangular street grid planned by Joachim Ernst Blesendorf, the Overseer of Fortifications and Construction, between the Georgenstraße in the north and the Schadowstraße in the south. Neustadt received town privileges in 1674 and was renamed Dorotheenstadt in Sophie Dorothea's honour in 1681, although the term was in use earlier.

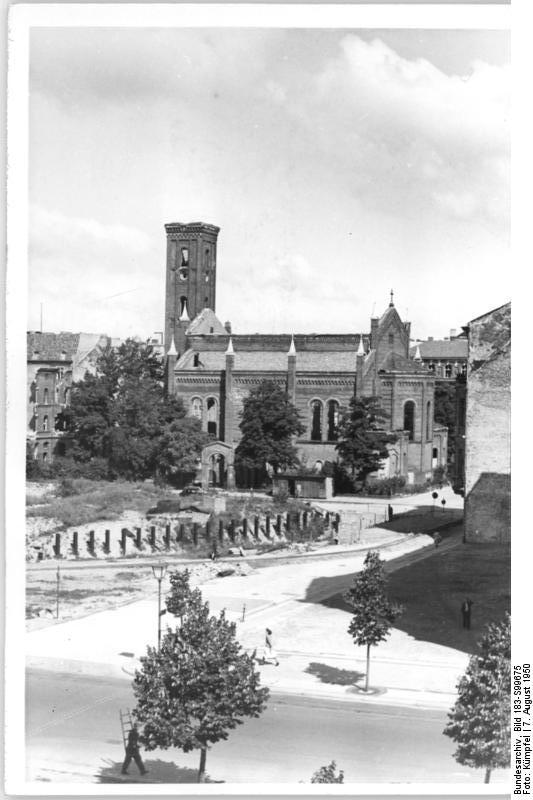
The burnt out Dorotheenstadt Church on Neustädtische Kirchstraße in 1950 (removed in 1968)

In 1709, Dorotheenstadt was united with the two cities of Berlin and Cölln and the other two electoral 'new towns' of Friedrichswerder and Friedrichstadt to form the "royal capital and residence city" of Berlin. As the 18th century continued, it was extended to the Spree in the north and the Tiergarten in the west. Originally the new towns were overwhelmingly residential, filled with stone houses 2 or 3 storeys in height, but in the second half of the 19th century, large government and business buildings replaced them. The eastern part of Dorotheenstadt, near the museums, developed into an academic area, including the Berlin University (now Humboldt University) and the Berlin State Library. Following the construction of the Berlin Stadtbahn in 1880, a vibrant urban centre grew up around Friedrichstraße station alongside the desirable and elegant district of Unter den Linden. The population fell from 20,144 in 1867 to 11,492 in 1910, as the area became less residential. In 1920, with the creation of Greater Berlin, Dorotheenstadt was incorporated into the newly created borough of Mitte.

After extensive destruction in World War II and the incorporation of Mitte into the Soviet Sector of the divided Berlin, which became East Berlin, many historic buildings, among them the Humboldt University, the Berlin State Opera and the Alte Bibliothek were rebuilt under the German Democratic Republic. Since German reunification in 1990, the western part of Dorotheenstadt around the Pariser Platz has also been rebuilt.

== Major buildings and landmarks ==
- Pariser Platz
  - Brandenburg Gate
  - U.S. Embassy
  - Academy of Arts
  - French Embassy
- Wilhelmstraße
  - Marschall Bridge
  - Jakob-Kaiser-Haus
  - British Embassy
- Unter den Linden
  - Russian Embassy
  - Komische Oper
  - Humboldt University
  - Staatsbibliothek
  - Alte Bibliothek
  - Bebelplatz
  - Berlin State Opera
  - Statue of Frederick the Great
  - Neue Wache
- Friedrichstraße
  - Weidendammer Bridge
  - Admiralspalast
  - Friedrichstraße station
  - Checkpoint Charlie Museum

== Cultural mentions ==
- Jens Gerlach, an East German poet, wrote a collection of poems called Dorotheenstädtische Monologe (Berlin: Aufbau, 1972)

== Sources ==
- Hermann Zech. Die Dorotheenstadt in Berlin-Mitte. Berlin: H. Zech, 2000. ISBN 3-9804914-2-0
