= Alt-Berlin =

Human settlement in Germany

- Neighborhood
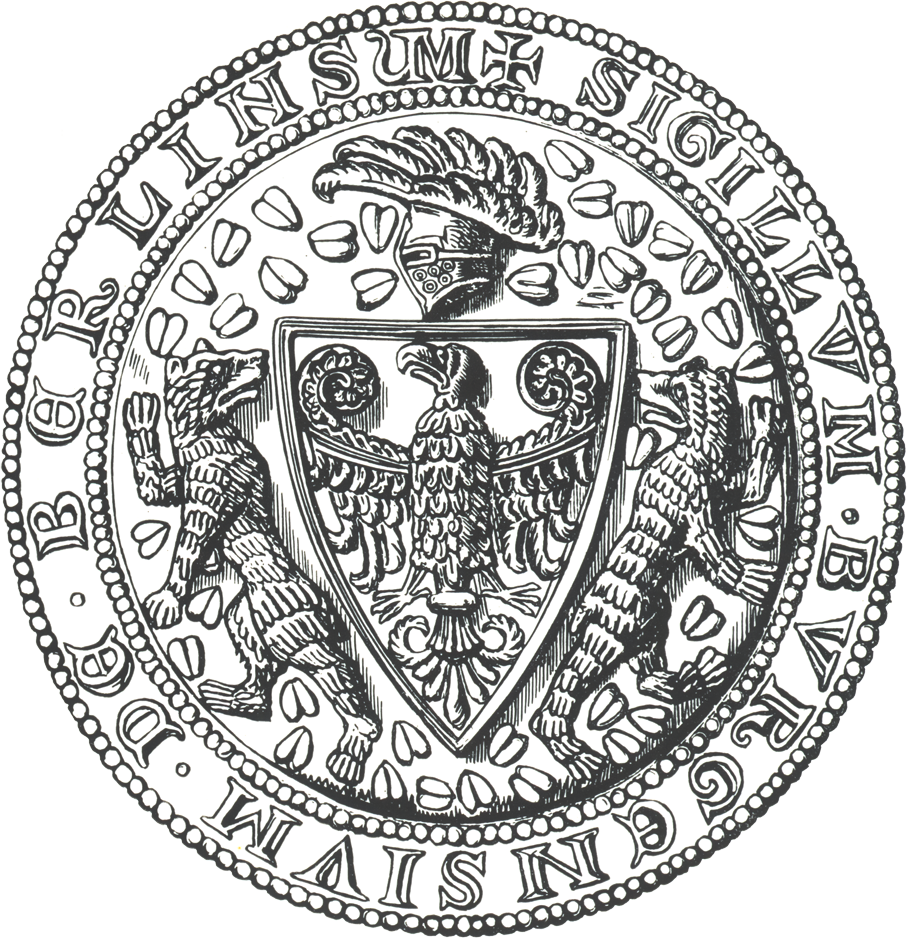
- Coat of arms

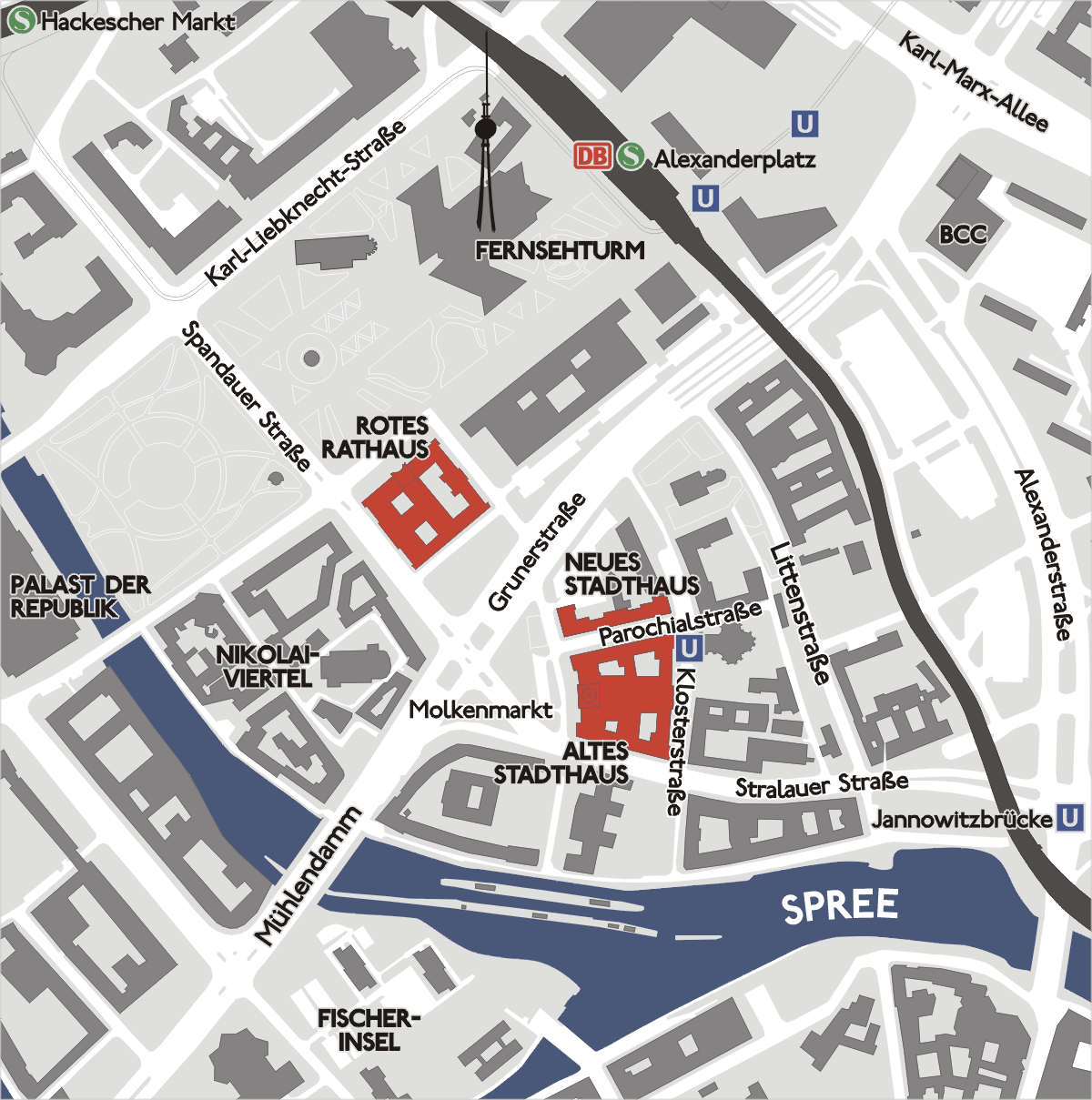
- Coordinates: 52°31′05″N 13°24′34″E
- Country: Germany
- City: Berlin
- Borough: Mitte
- Locality: Mitte
- Elevation: 34 m (112 ft)

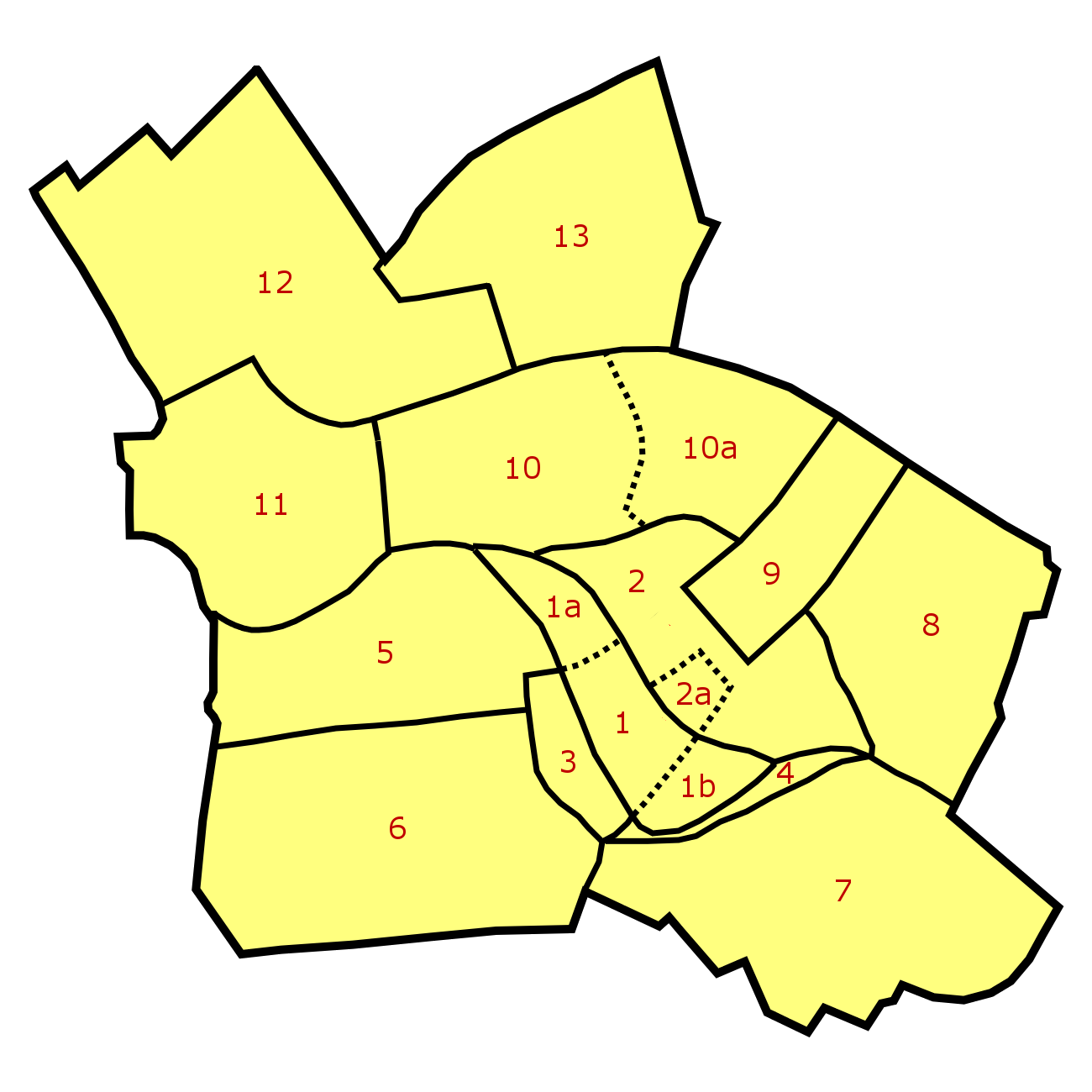
Quarters of Berlin-Mitte: Cölln (1); Museum Island (1a); Fisher Island (1b); Alt-Berlin (2); Nikolaiviertel (2a); Friedrichswerder (3); Neukölln am Wasser (4); Dorotheenstadt (5); Friedrichstadt (6); Luisenstadt (7); Stralauer Vorstadt (8); Alexanderplatz (9); Spandauer Vorstadt (10); Scheunenviertel (10a); Friedrich-Wilhelm-Stadt (11); Oranienburger Vorstadt (12); Rosenthaler Vorstadt (13)

Alt-Berlin ("Old Berlin"), also spelled Altberlin, is a neighborhood (Stadtviertel), situated in the Berliner locality (Ortsteil) of Mitte, part of the homonymous borough. In the 13th century it was the sister town of the old Cölln, located on the northern Spree Island in the Margraviate of Brandenburg. The neighbourhoods (Viertel) of Nikolaiviertel, Marienviertel, Klosterviertel are within Alt-Berlin.

== History ==
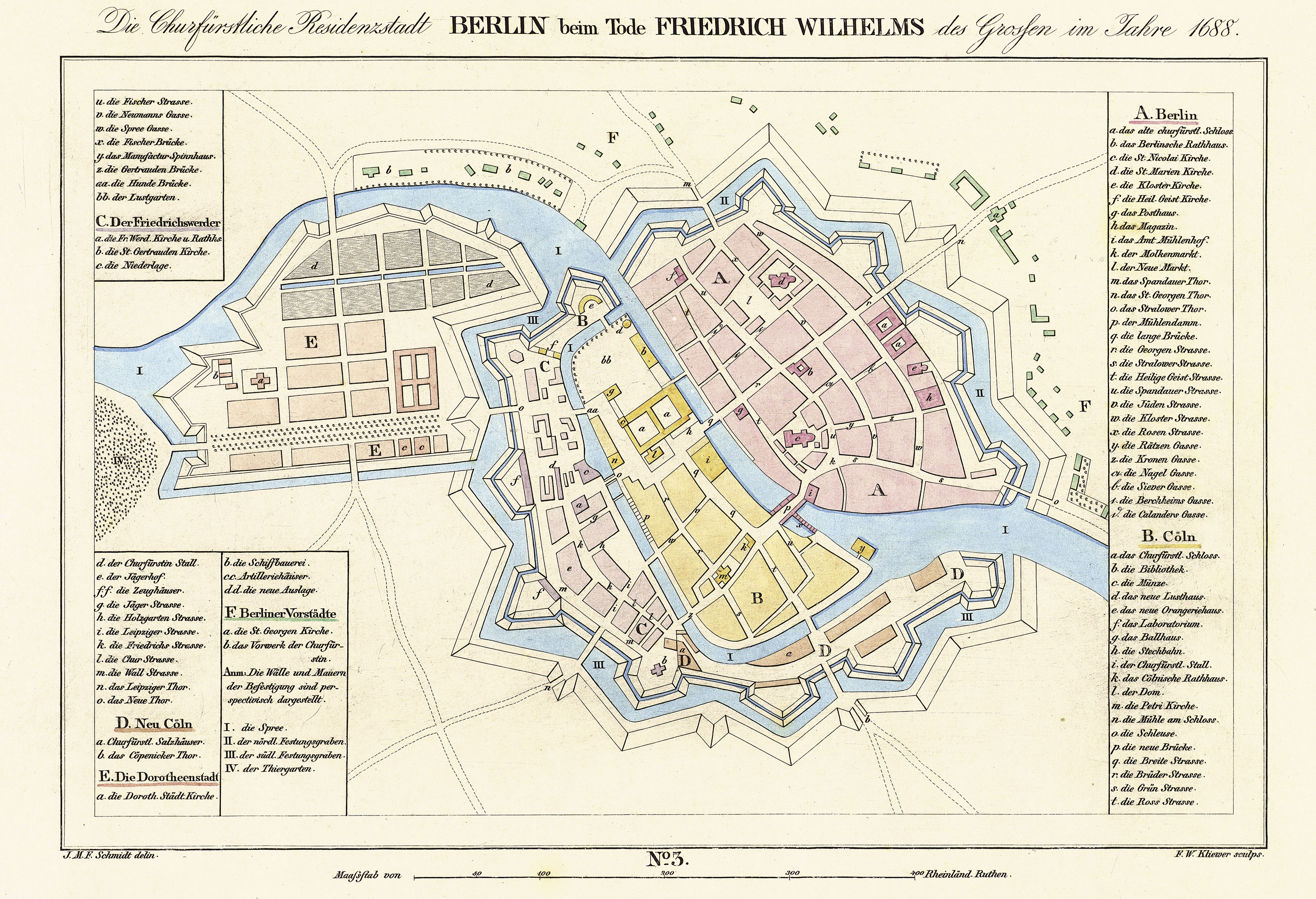
Central Berlin map of 1688 with Altberlin shown in pink

First mentioned in 1244, 7 years after Cölln, it represents the original core of the modern Berlin. The first stone fortification was built, to defend both cities, in 1250 and in 1251 it gained city rights. In 1280 Berlin, gained the right to mint currency. In that period it appeared on a coat of arms for the first time, close to the symbol of the imperial eagle, two stylized bears, antecedents of the bear currently serving as the symbol of the city. On 20 March 1307 the town was united with Cölln (maintaining its name, Berlin) forming a trading union on political and security matters, and participated in the Hanseatic League.

== Geography ==
Alt-Berlin, crossed at its southern borders by the river Spree, is located in the middle of the city. Its northern borders are represented, except for the square area of Alexanderplatz, by the Stadtbahn railway line between the station of Jannowitzbrücke and a rail bridge after Hackescher Markt station.

== Photogallery ==
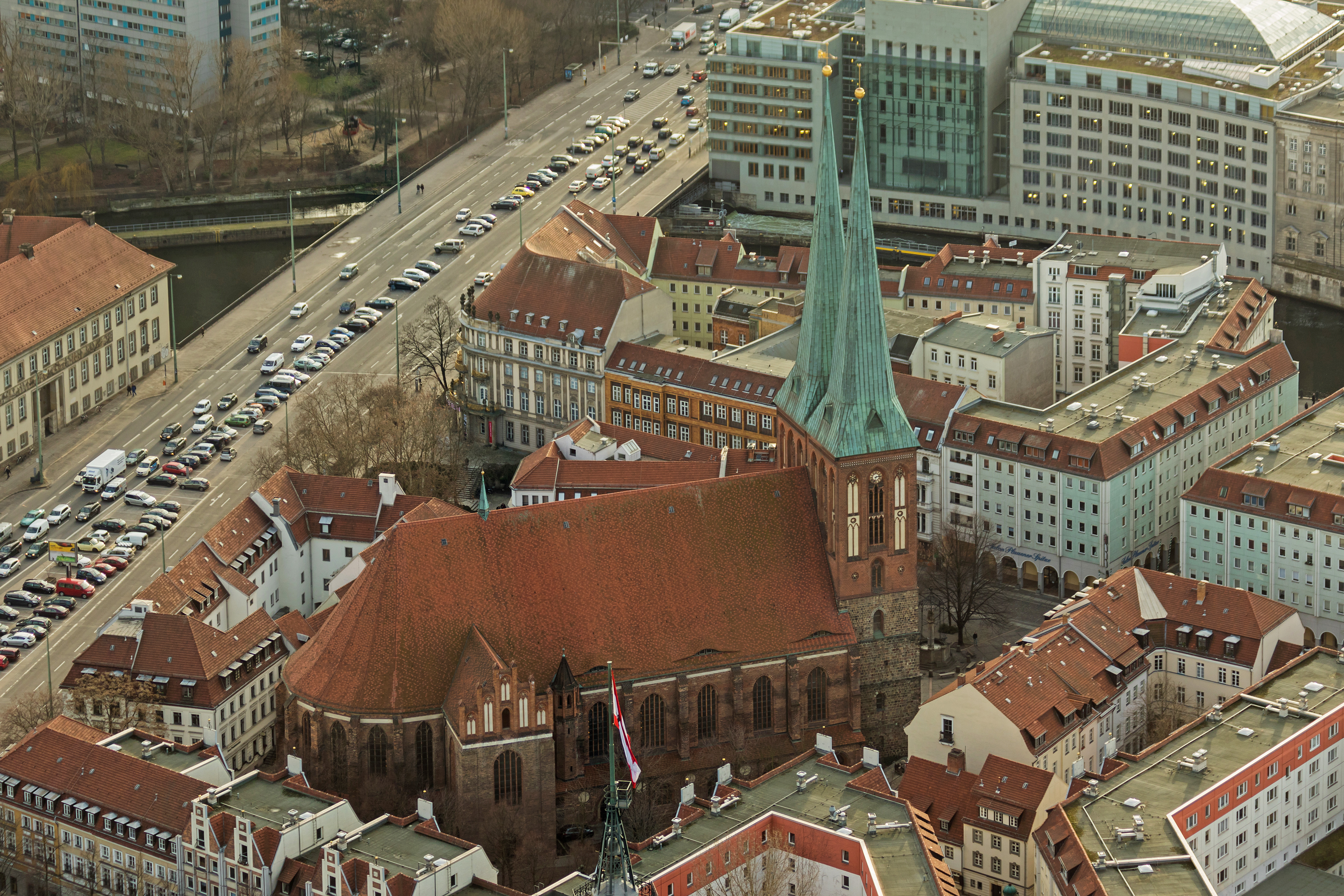
Aerial view of the Nikolaikirche in the Nikolaiviertel

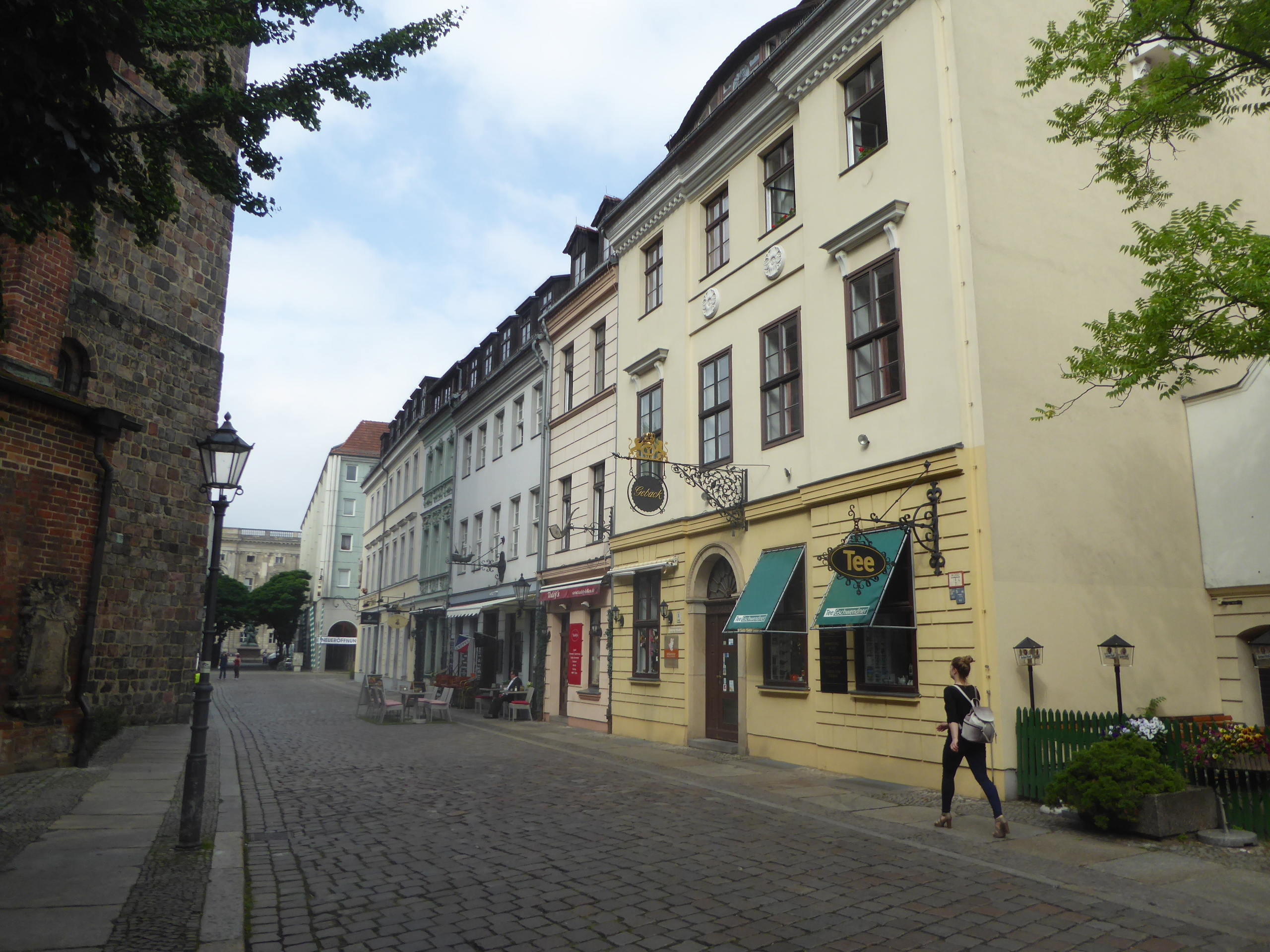
Probststraße in the Nikolaiviertel

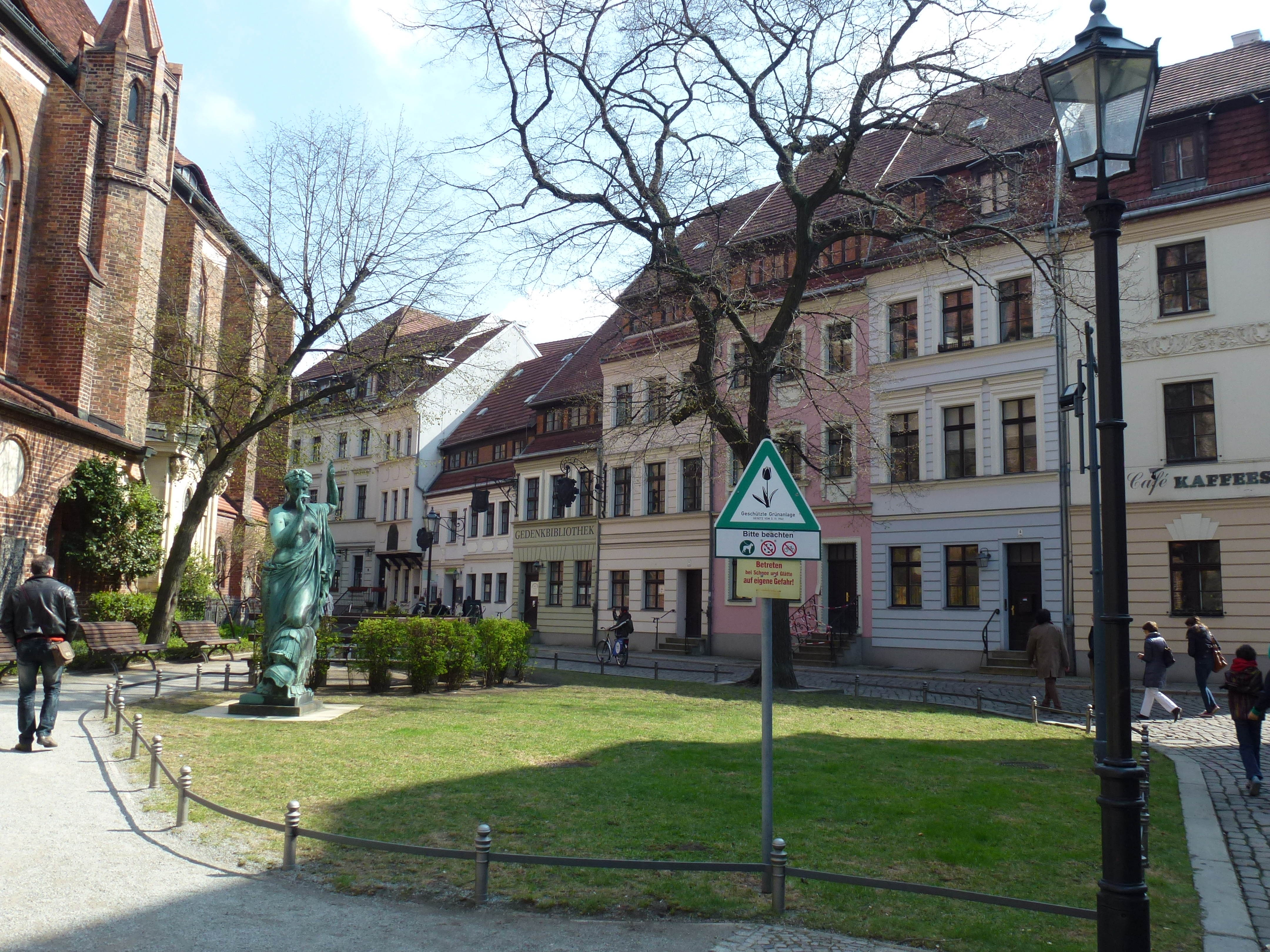
Nikolaikirchplatz in the Nikolaiviertel

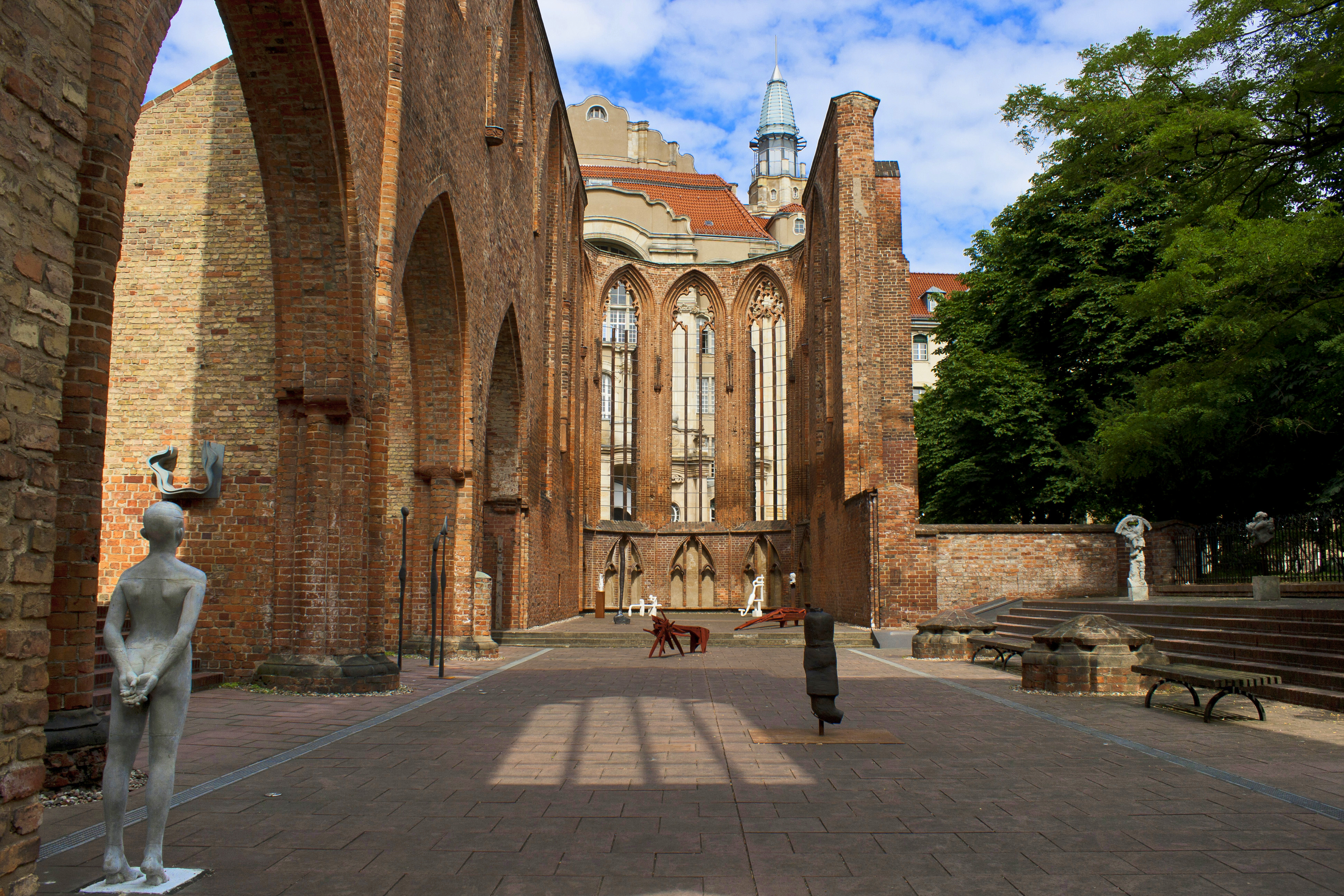
Ruins of the so-called "Gray Monastery" with the Franziskaner-Klosterkirche

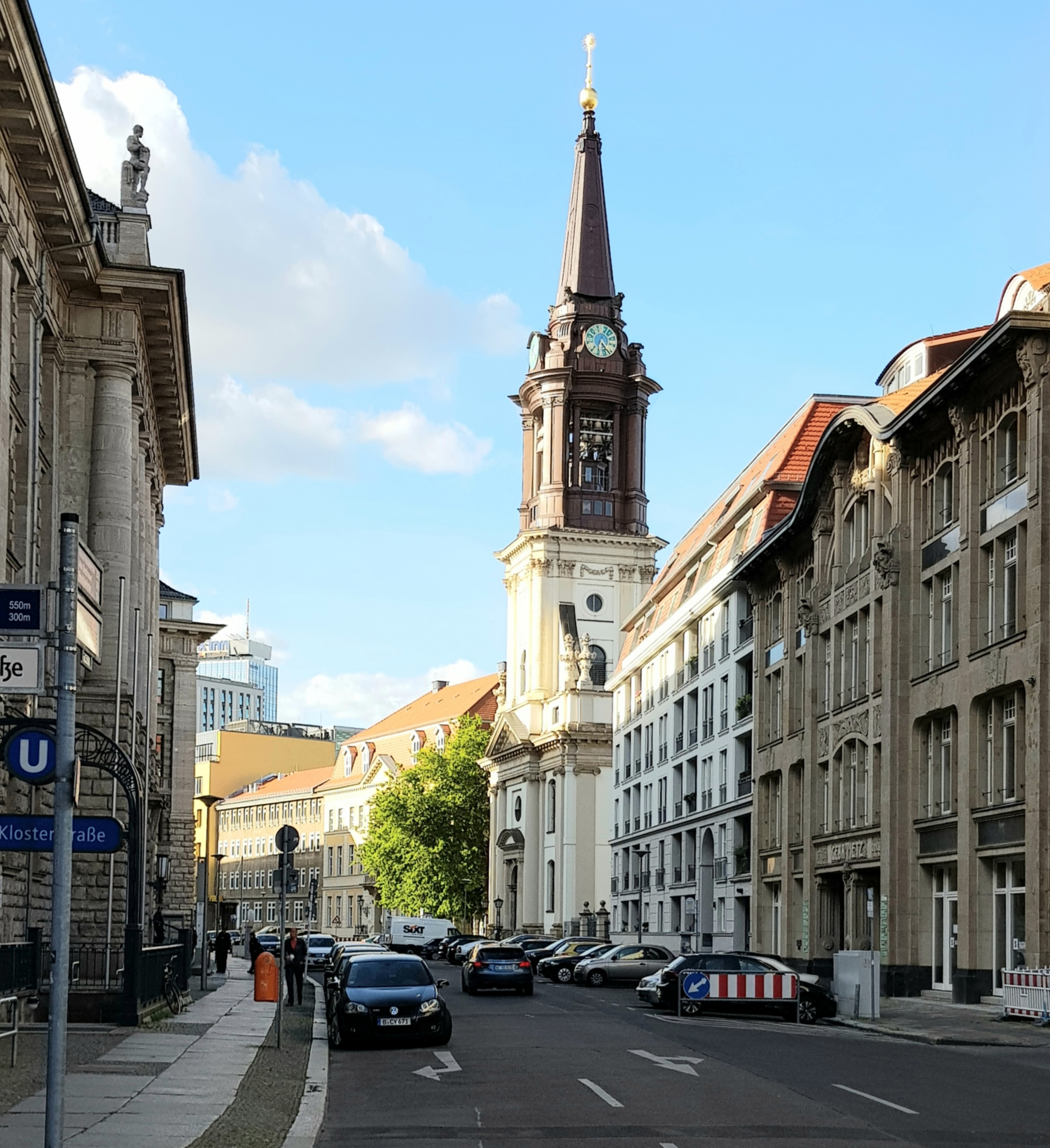
Klosterstraße with the Parochialkirche

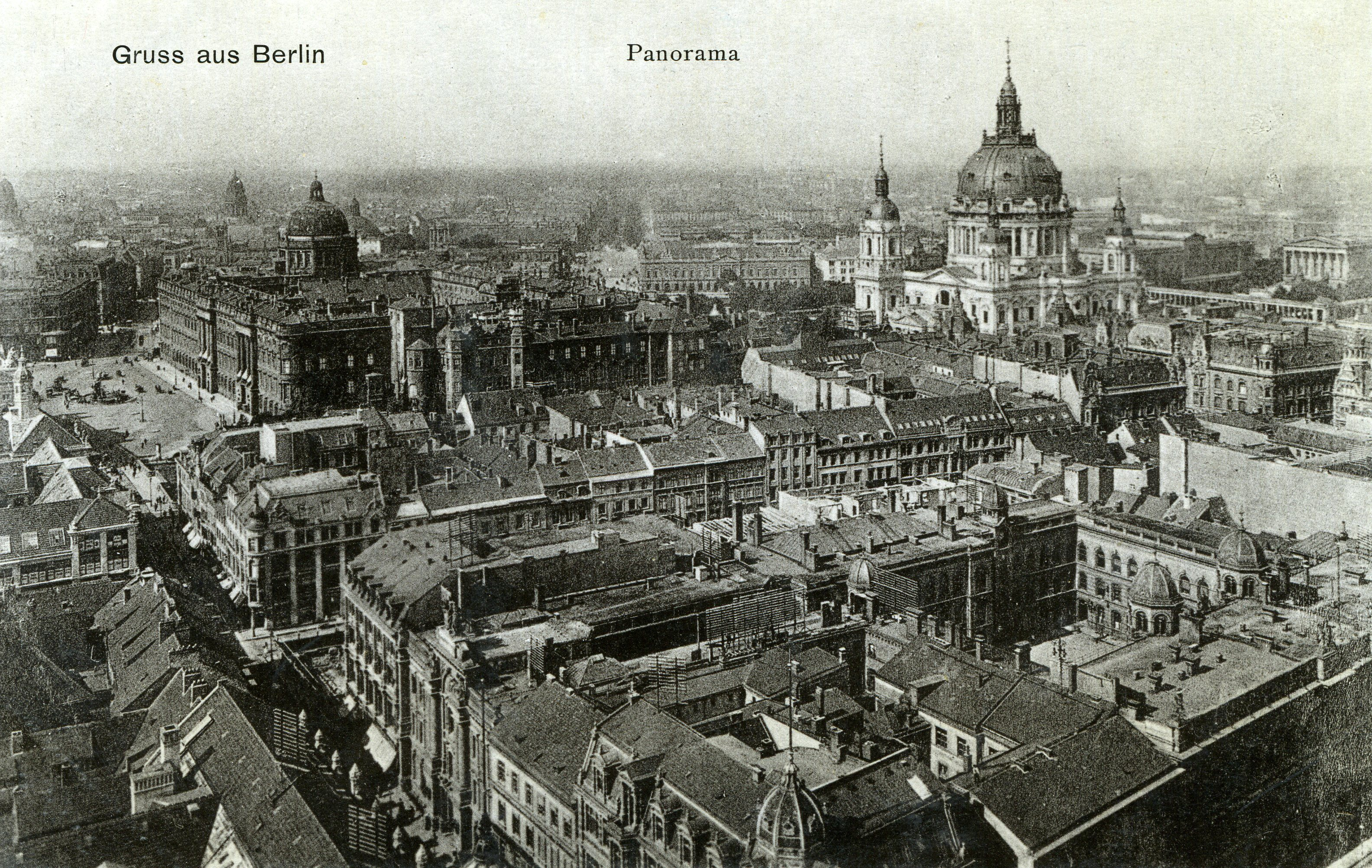
Heilige-Geist-Viertel in Alt-Berlin, in the background is the Berlin Palace and the Berlin Cathedral, taken from the tower of the Rotes Rathaus, ca. 1910

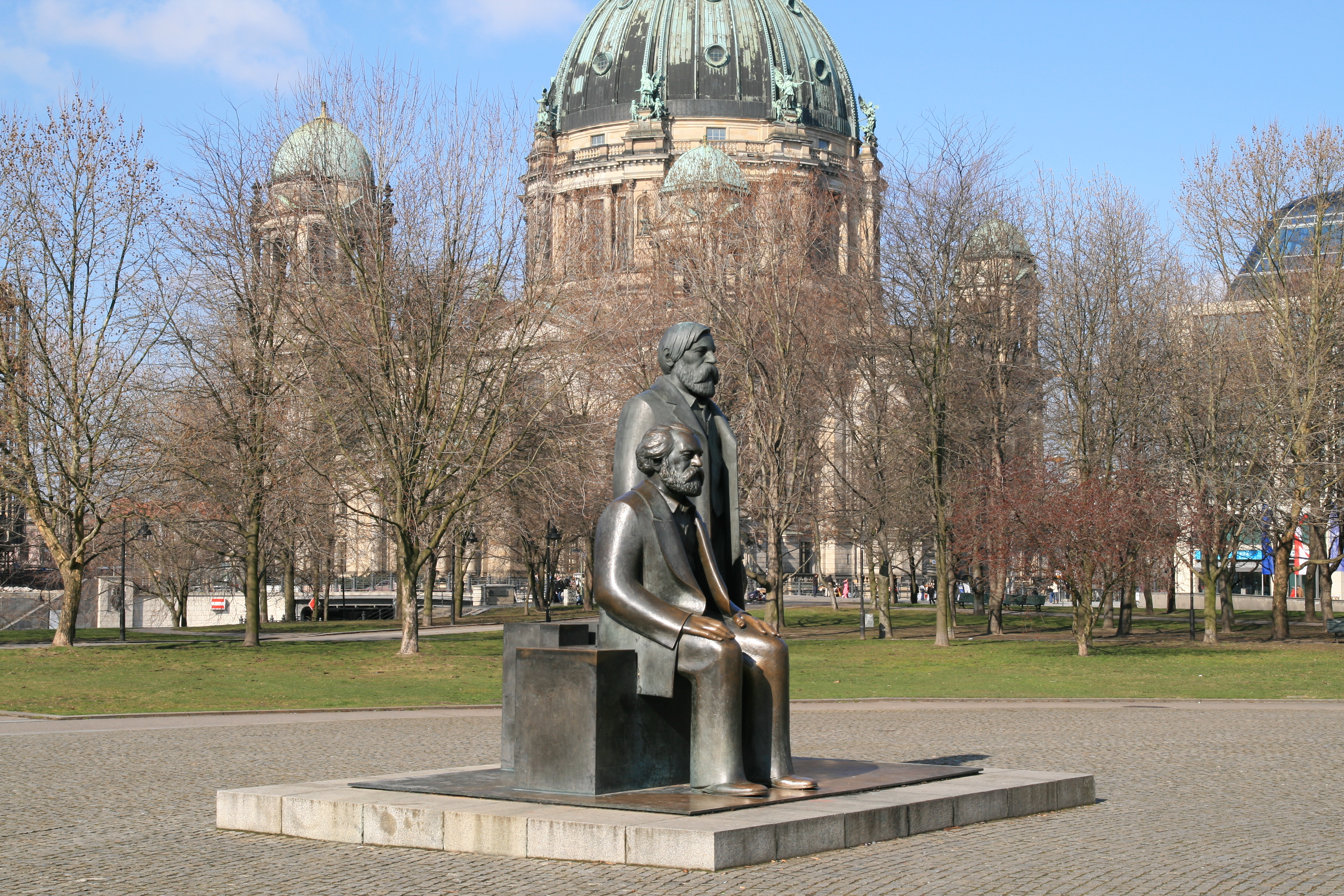
The Marx-Engels-Forum, located at the site of the Heilige-Geist-Viertel

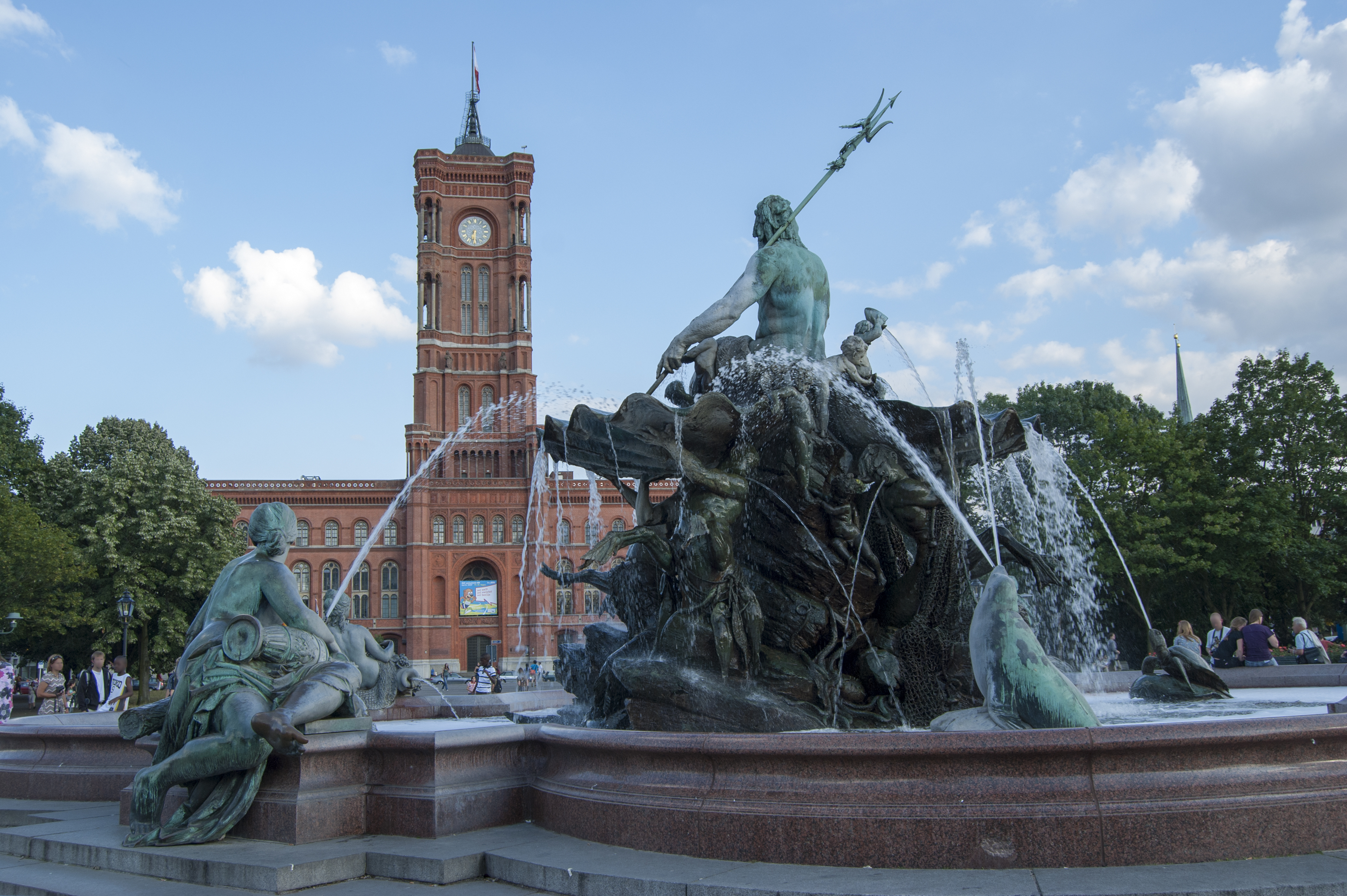
Rotes Rathaus, the city hall of Berlin and Neptunbrunnen

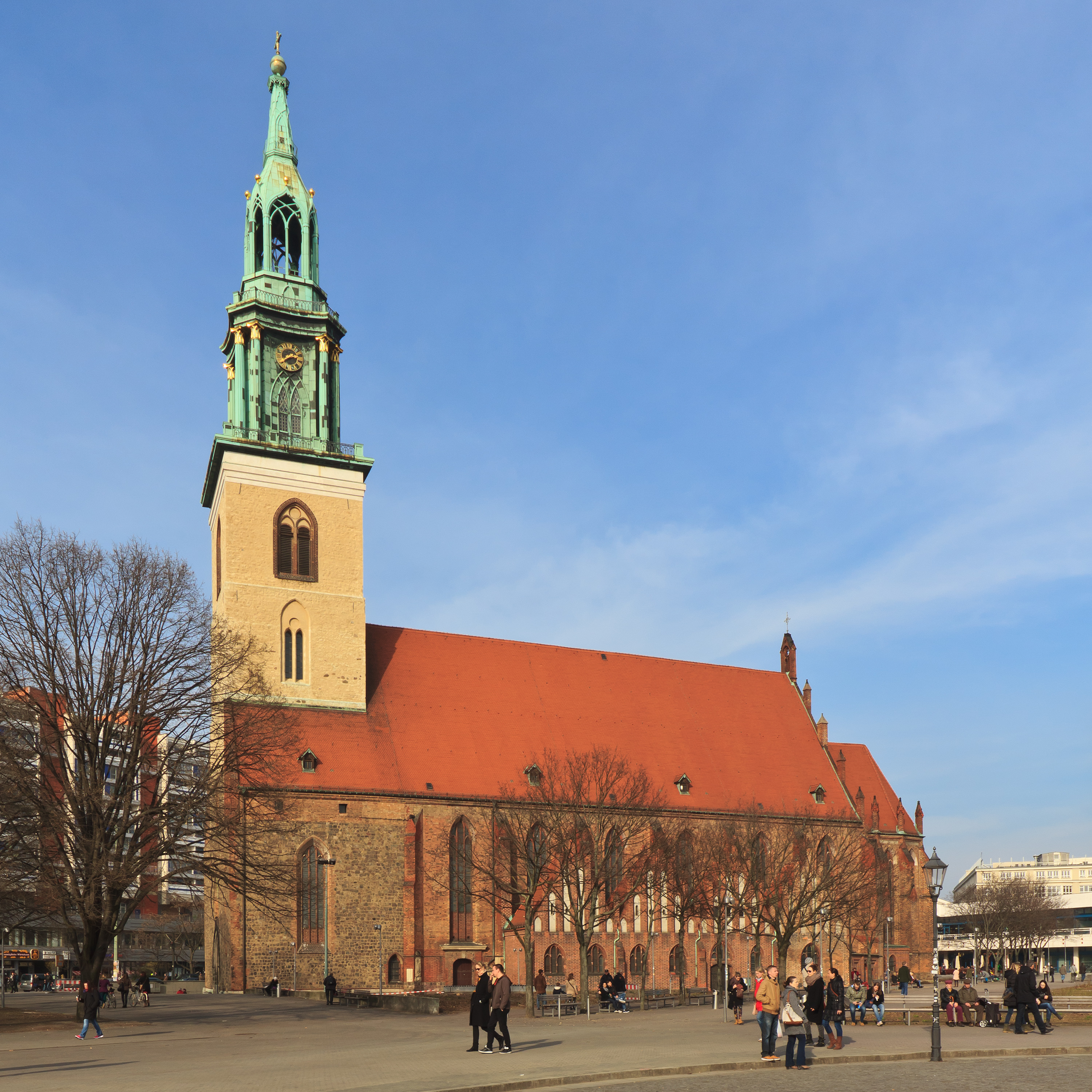
St. Mary's Church, the only remaining pre-war building in the Marienviertel district
