= Jungfern Bridge =

Bridge in Berlin, Germany

Jungfern Bridge Jungfernbrücke (Berlin)
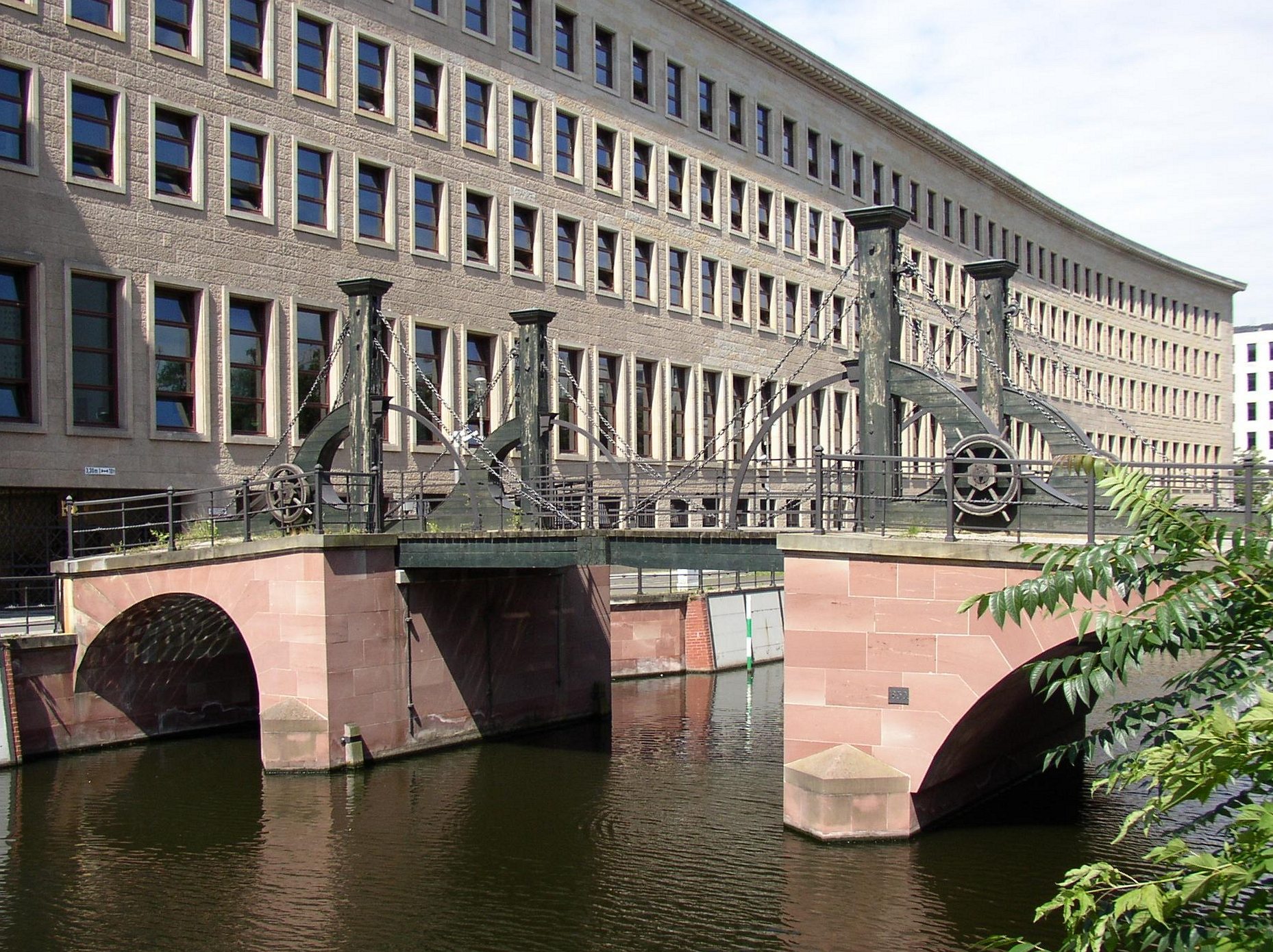
- Jungfern Bridge
- Coordinates: 52°30′49″N 13°24′05″E
- Carries: Pedestrians
- Crosses: Kupfergraben
- Locale: Mitte, Berlin, Germany

Characteristics
- Design: Bascule bridge
- Material: Iron
- Total length: 28 metres (92 ft)
- Width: 4.5 metres (15 ft)
- Longest span: 8.7 metres (29 ft)
- No. of spans: 3
- Piers in water: 2
- Clearance below: 4.5 metres (15 ft)

History
- Constructed by: hölzerne Klappbrücke auf Steinwiderlagern

Location
- Interactive map of Jungfern Bridge

The Jungfern Bridge (German: Jungfernbrücke) is a bridge in Berlin. It is the oldest bridge in Berlin. There have been nine predecessors on its site in Berlin-Mitte, spanning the Spree arm Kupfergraben and linking Friedrichsgracht to Oberwasserstraße.
