= Marc Jordi =

Swiss architect

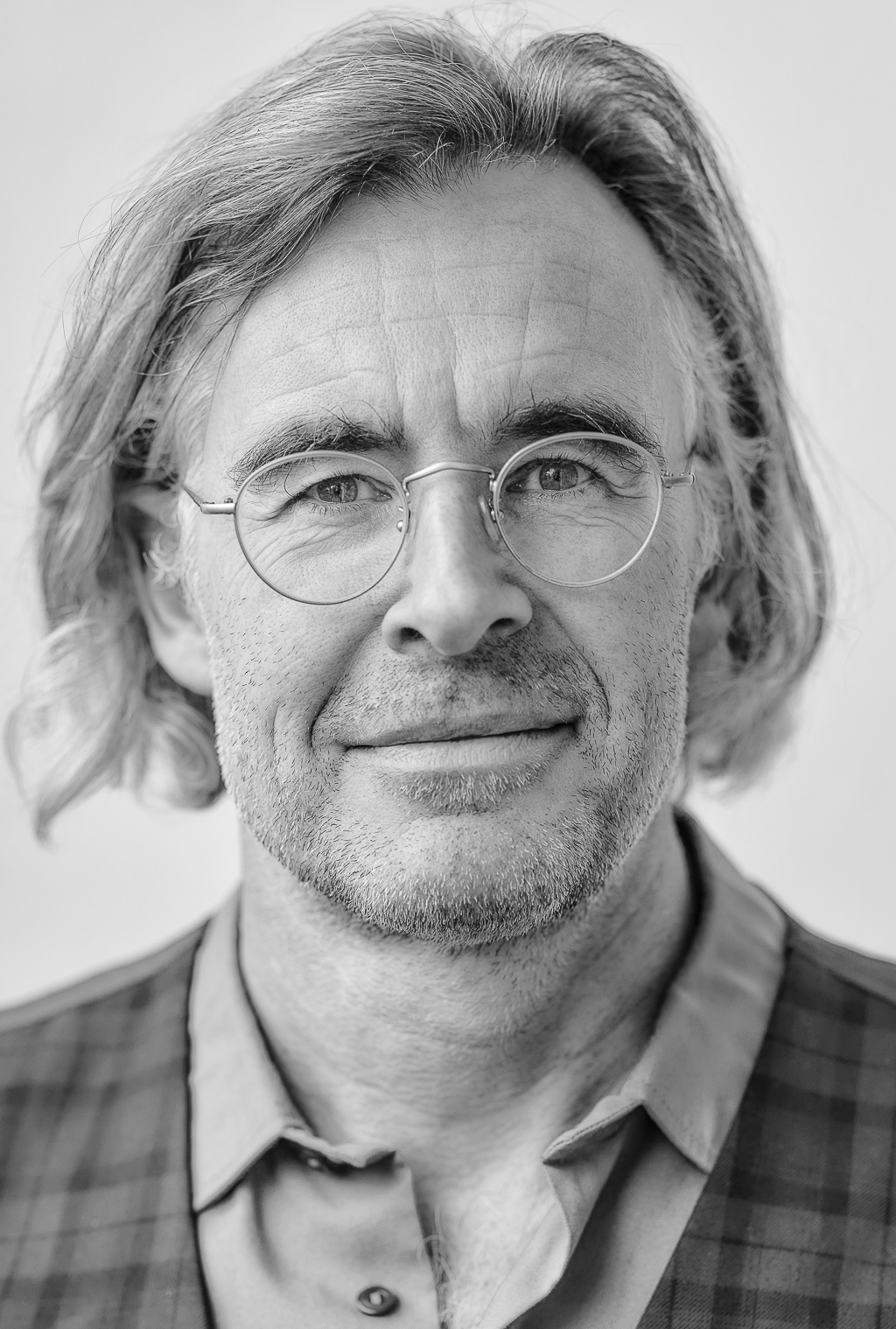
Marc Jordi, architect, illustrator, sculptor Photography by Stefan Freund

Marc Jordi (born 1967) is a Swiss architect and artist who lives and works in Berlin, Germany. His artistic work is in sculpture, drawing and photography. Jordi is a partner in the architecture office of Jordi-Keller. He is an advocate of "contextualism" in urban planning which bases the analysis of the surroundings and the history of the location as the foundation for the architectural design. His work consists of the integration of components from demolished buildings into the new buildings, and is so-called Spolia "virtuoso". In his "Torsi" sculptures he explores the relationship of becoming and decaying as testimony of aging and as a central theme of the creative process. As a photographer he presents a visual artistic attempt to explore the limits of power and size in small formats. His works were presented in exhibitions and architectural competitions in Berlin, Frankfurt and Leipzig and he received many prizes.In 2021 he founded the Jordi-Keller-Pellnitz architectural firm for large urban development projects and archeological studies as well as the Schlosskirche Buch working group for monument preservation and restoration projects.

== Biography ==
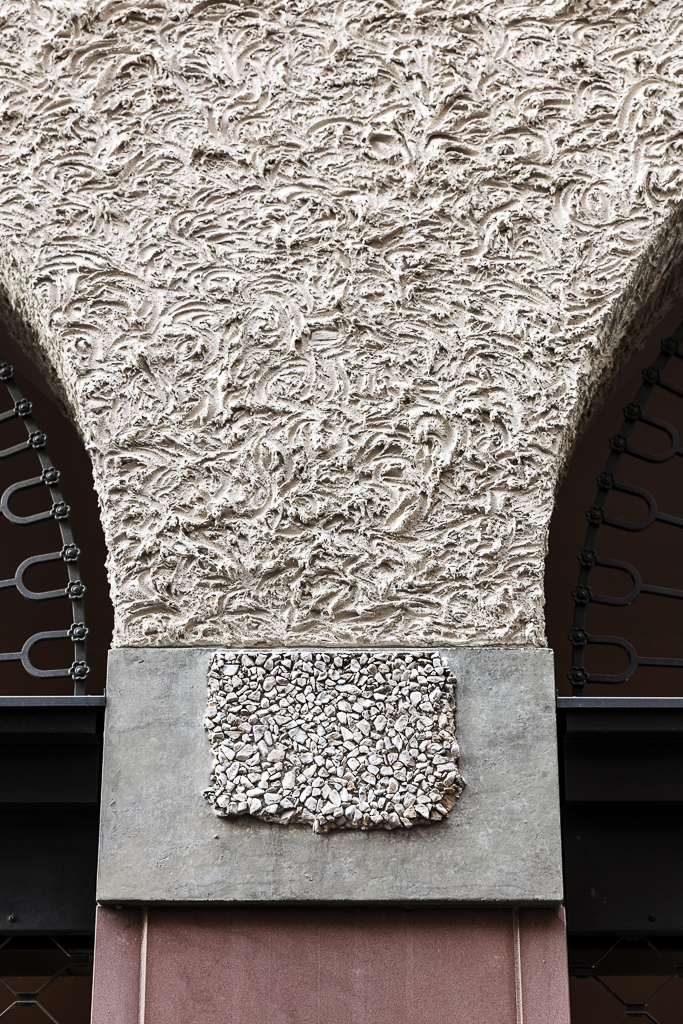
Markt 8, Frankfurt am Main, Neue Altstadt, Jordi & Keller Architects,

Born in Konolfingen Switzerland. Jordi completed his studies and apprenticeship as a draftsman and architect at the Technical College in Bern in 1993. In 1994 and 1995 he worked in various architectural firms and at the Berlin Senate Department for Urban Development. He founded with colleagues the Keller-Günther-Jordi architecture firm in 1996. In 2008 he founded together with Susanne Keller the Jordi-Keller architecture firm. Amongst Jordi's projects are the rebuilding of the house—"To the Three Romans"—at "Markt 40" in the Dom-Römer project in the historic center of Frankfurt, and the Stadthaus on Friedrichswerder, Berlin. He was in charge on the rebuilding of the house at Market 8 "Grober Rebstock" in the Dom-Romer project.

Jordi & Keller firm participated in the restoration of the medieval episcopal St. Mary's Church, Berlin (Marienkirche). Jordi explores the dialog between art and architecture. In his first exhibition of black and white architectural photos, Moments of the Monumental in Berlin, 2003, Jordi, tried to capture the transcendental moments and the monumental atmosphere in architectural spaces. In sculpture, his solo exhibition with 'Torsi' sculptures were presented in 2014 in Parochialkirche, Berlin. His drawings emphasize the sketchy quality of charcoal in quasi-architectural forms as a symbolic act of freedom from the burden of functionality and so evokes a sense of ambiguity.

== Art exhibitions ==
- 2014: 'Torsi', solo exhibition with sculptures, Parochialkirche Berlin.
- 2016: The mother of the arts - architectural sculpture and handicrafts in architecture, Ausstellungshalle Frankfurt.
- 2017: An exhibition in Berlin - Twilight in Brandenburg.
- 2019: Body - Memento Mori, solo exhibition with sculptures, Parochialkirche Berlin.
- 2020: 'Art Aber Fair', Direct auction.
- 2024: Donation of six drawings by Marc jordi to the Tchoban Foundation - Museum for Architectural Drawings Berlin.
- 2025: 'From cult object to house', solo exhibition with sculptures, Parochialkirche Berlin.

== Architecture awards ==
- 2008: 1st prize, Architecture Competition, 'New building of a residential ensemble Rittergut, Leipzig M. Jordi & S. Keller. (Ger.)
- 2008: 1st prize, Architecture Competition, KfW-Award 2008, New building 'Stadthaus auf dem Friedrichswerder', Berlin.(Ger.)
- 2011: 1st prize, Architecture Competition, Haus Markt 40, 'Zu den drei Römern', M. Jordi & S. Keller.(Ger.)
- 2011: 1st prize, Architecture Competition, Haus Markt 8, 'Großer Rebstock', 'DomRömer' in Frankfurt am Main, M. Jordi & S. Keller(Ger.)
- 2019: Second prize in the Konigsufer and Neustadter Market urban development competition in Dresden.
- 2019-20: Third prize at the international urban planning ideas competition Berlin-Brandenburg.
- 2025: Third prize in the 'Molkenmarket Los 1' achitechtural competition in berlin-Mitte, ArGe with Prof. Hans Kollhoff and Prof Uwe Schroder

== Selected articles ==
- Architecture with ADHD (Architektur mit ADHS)(2019).(Ger.)
- This is how the architects find Frankfurt's new old town (So finden die Architekten die neue Frankfurter Altstadt)(2018).„Traumwelt“ oder „peinlich“?: So finden die Architekten die neue Frankfurter Altstadt(Ger.)
- A decal, not an archetype (Ein Abziehbild, kein Archetyp)(2017).Kulturforum Berlin: Ein Abziehbild, kein Archetyp.(Ger)
- There is still time for accounting in Frankfurt (Noch ist in Frankfurt Zeit zur Abrechnung). Frankfurter Allgemeine Zeitung(2015)..(Ger.)
- Capital City to Leisure Landscape (Hauptstadt zu Freizeitlandschaft), Frankfurter Allgemeine Zeitung(2015). (Ger.)
- An unprecedented construction work: The competition’s core requirements(2013).
