= Hermann, Freiherr von Soden =

German Biblical scholar

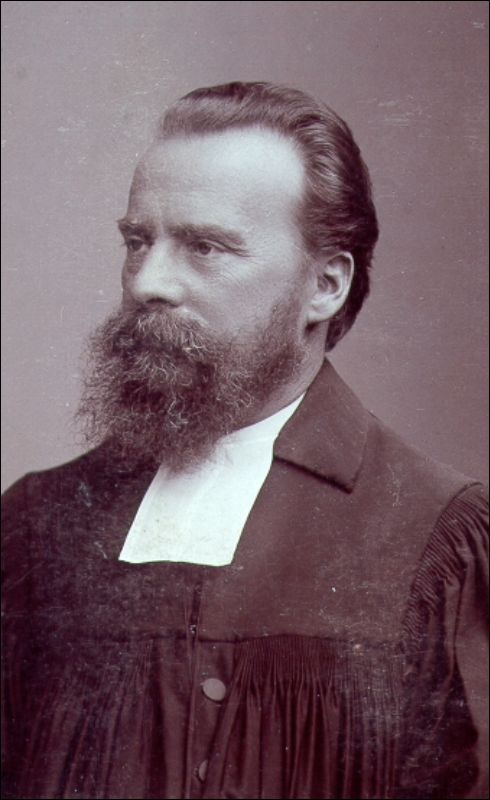
Hermann von Soden

Baron Hermann von Soden (16 August 1852 – 15 January 1914) was a German Biblical scholar, minister, professor of divinity, and textual theorist.

== Life ==
Born in Cincinnati, Ohio, on August 16, 1852, Soden was educated at the University of Tübingen. In 1881 he was appointed as the minister at Dresden-Striesen and in 1887 he became minister of the Jerusalem Church in Berlin. In 1889 he also became a privatdozent, a form of tutor, in the University of Berlin, and four years later was appointed as an extraordinary professor of divinity. He fought for a more presbyterian and democratic constitution in the congregations of the Evangelical State Church of Prussia's older Provinces. His grave is preserved in the Protestant Friedhof II der Jerusalems- und Neuen Kirchengemeinde (Cemetery No. II of the congregations of the Jerusalem's Church and the New Church) in Berlin-Kreuzberg, south of the Hallesches Tor.

Soden introduced a new notation of manuscripts and also developed a new theory of textual history. He believed that in the 4th century there were in existence three recensions of the text of the New Testament, which he distinguished as K, H and I. After establishing the text of I, H and K, Soden reconstructed a hypothetical text, I-H-K, which he believed to have been their ancestor. He then tried to show that this text was known to all the writers of the 2nd and 3rd centuries.

Soden died in a railway accident in Berlin on January 15, 1914. His descendant Wolfram von Soden became a noted Assyriologist.

== Works ==
His most important book is Die Schriften des neuen Testaments, in ihrer ältesten erreichbaren Textgestalt / hergestellt auf Grund ihrer Textgeschichte (4 vols., Berlin: Glaue, 1902-1910); certainly the most important work on the text of the New Testament which had been published since Westcott and Hort's The New Testament in the Original Greek. Other works include:

- Der Brief des Apostels Paulus an die Philipper, Freiburg i. Br., 1880.
- Hebräerbrief, Briefe des Petrus, Jakobus, Judas, Freiburg i. Br., 1890.
- Und was thut die evangelische Kirche? Erwogen angesichts der Reichstagswahlen, zumal in unseren Großstädten, 3rd. ed., Berlin: Nauck, 1890 (a pamphlet written during the campaign for the Reichstag election)
- Die Briefe an die Kolosser, Epheser, Philemon; die Pastoralbriefe, Freiburg i. Br., 1891.
- "Untersuchungen über neutestamentliche Schriften" in Protestantisches Jahrbuch für theologische Studien und Schriftkommentar, 1895–1897.
- Palästina und seine Geschichte, sechs volkstümliche Vorträge, Leipzig, 1899.
- Die wichtigsten Fragen im Leben Jesu, Ferienkurs-Vorträge Berlin, 1904.
- Die Schriften des Neuen Testaments in ihrer ältesten erreichbaren Textgestalt hergestellt auf Grund ihrer Textgeschichte. 4 volumes, Berlin, 1902–1913.
- Urchristliche Literaturgeschichte, die Schriften des Neuen Testaments, Berlin: Duncker, 1905.
- Hat Jesus gelebt? Aus den geschichtlichen Urkunden beantwortet von Hermann von Soden, Berlin, 1910.

He contributed to the 1903 Encyclopaedia Biblica and to the "Hand-Commentar zum Neuen Testament", several editions, started in 1855 by Heinrich Julius Holtzmann and Hans von Soden
