= Giovanni Simonetti =

Swiss architect, and plasterer (1652–1716)

- Born: 1652; Roveredo, then part of the Grey League
- Died: 4 November 1716 (aged 63–64); Berlin, Kingdom of Prussia
- Occupations: Architect, stucco plasterer

Giovanni Simonetti (1652 – 4 November 1716) was a Swiss architect and stucco plasterer who worked primarily in Germany. He became court stucco plasterer and master mason in Berlin and later court architect of Anhalt-Zerbst. His major commissions included the Berlin City Palace and Zerbst Palace, as well as churches in Berlin. Much of his work has been lost. He was an important figure in seventeenth-century Baroque art in central Germany.

== Biography ==
Giovanni Simonetti was born in 1652 in Roveredo, Grisons. His father, Simone Simonetti, was a builder who worked in Germany. Simonetti spent most of his career in Germany, working as a stucco plasterer and architect. He is first documented professionally in Prague in 1668, when he was a journeyman bricklayer. Simonetti later received an appointment as royal stucco plasterer at the Berlin-Brandenburg court. From 1682, he served as court stucco plasterer and from 1683 as court master mason in Berlin. In 1699, he was appointed court architect of Anhalt-Zerbst. He died in Berlin in 1716.

== Work ==
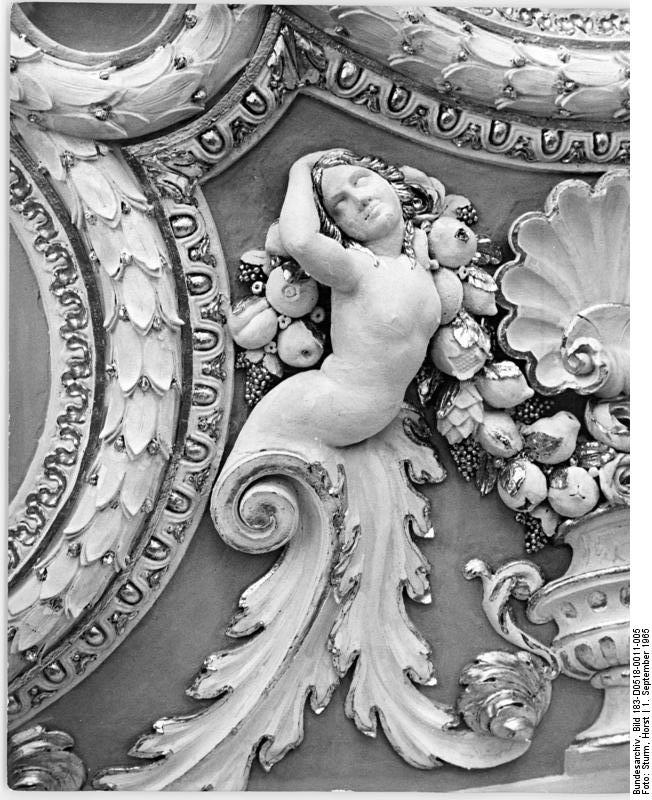
Detail of a stucco ceiling in a room at Köpenick Palace, Berlin

In 1680, Simonetti carried out stucco work in the Chapel of St Elisabeth at Breslau Cathedral, now in Wrocław. Between 1683 and 1689, he produced stucco work for the Junkerhaus in Frankfurt an der Oder. Several of Simonetti's stucco ceilings and fireplace decorations survive there. Around 1685, he carried out the stucco decoration in the main block of Oranienbaum Palace, where most of his upper-floor stucco ceilings survive. Between 1684 and 1690, Simonetti and Giovanni Caroveri carried out stucco work at Köpenick Palace during construction directed by Johann Arnold Nering.

In 1686, Simonetti worked on the Alte Börse in Leipzig, where he created the stucco ceiling in the main hall. From 1687, Simonetti worked on the construction of Barby Castle from designs by Johann Arnold Nering and also produced stucco work there. From 1689 to 1693, he carried out the rebuilding and enlargement of the Jerusalem Church in Berlin.

Simonetti designed the Baroque high altar for St Marien in Torgau, which was executed under his supervision between 1694 and 1698. From 1697 to 1698, Simonetti carried out work at Elector Frederick III’s palace in Oranienburg. In 1698, he worked with court sculptor Johann Michael Döbel the Younger on a new pulpit for Berlin Cathedral.

From 1698 to 1706, Simonetti directed and coordinated the stucco work at the Berlin City Palace. Working from designs by Andreas Schlüter, he produced decorations for several rooms and cabinets in the palace. Works securely attributed to Simonetti included the Four Continents in the Rittersaal, the Fall of the Giants in the Great Staircase and the atlantes in the Elisabethsaal. The demolition of the Berlin City Palace in 1950 destroyed Simonetti's surviving work there.

Simonetti also worked as an architect. In 1700–01, he carried out the construction of the Werdersche Kirche in Berlin from designs by Martin Grünberg. He also executed the Neue Kirche, another Grünberg design, between 1701 and 1708.

At Zerbst Palace, Simonetti carried out much of the stucco work in the main block between 1693 and 1696 and took over construction management after Cornelis Ryckwaert's death in 1693. After Ryckwaert's death, he took over the interior work at the Trinity Church in Zerbst, which continued until 1696. From 1703 to 1708, he was responsible for the westward extension of Zerbst Palace and also prepared its designs. In 1708, Simonetti took over construction management of the Dompropstei in Magdeburg and worked with other craftsmen on its interior stucco decoration.

Much of Simonetti's work has been lost, including major commissions at the Berlin City Palace, the Alte Börse in Leipzig and Zerbst Palace. Surviving examples include a stucco ceiling at the Junkerhaus in Frankfurt an der Oder, work at Coswig Palace and the baptismal font at St Nicolai in Coswig. The Simonettihaus in Coswig was built between 1699 and 1705. It takes its name from its Baroque stucco ceilings, which are attributed to Simonetti and his workshop. In 2007, a local association saved the building from demolition. Simonetti was an important figure in seventeenth-century Baroque art in central Germany.
