= Philipp Gerlach =

Prussian court architect

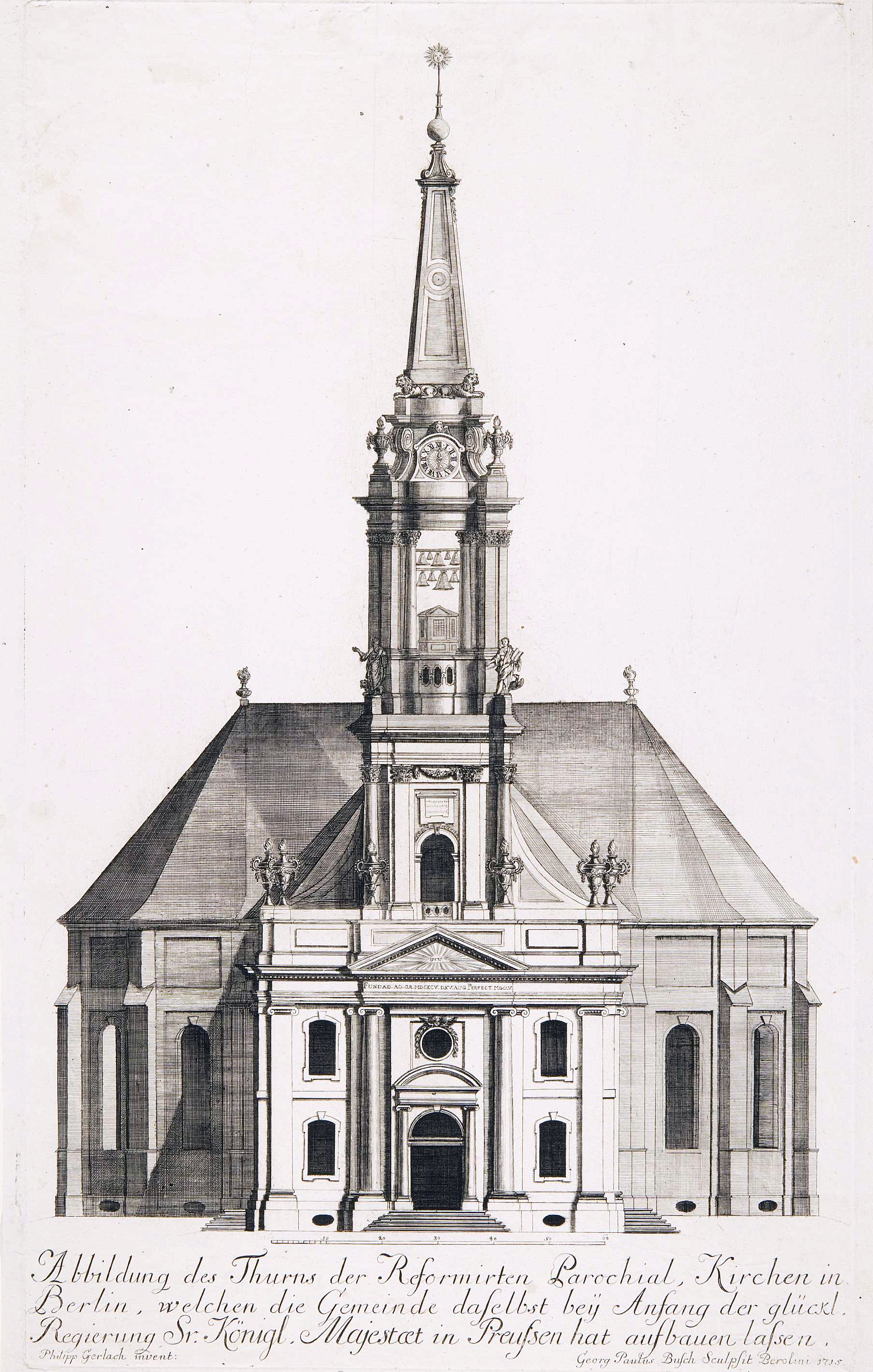
Parochialkirche in Berlin built after Gerlach's design

Johann Philipp Gerlach (24 July 1679 – 17 September 1748) was a Prussian court architect, who built churches and public buildings in and around Berlin and Potsdam.

== Career ==
Gerlach was born in Spandau. In 1707, he succeeded Martin Grünberg as royal director of building (königlicher Baudirektor und Leiter des Bauwesens) in Berlin. King Frederick William I of Prussia promoted him to Oberbaudirektor der königlichen Residenzen in 1720, making him responsible for all building of the state including bridges and fortifications. Gerlach directed the remodelling of the Kronprinzenpalais in 1733, and built the Kollegienhaus/Kammergericht in 1734/35.

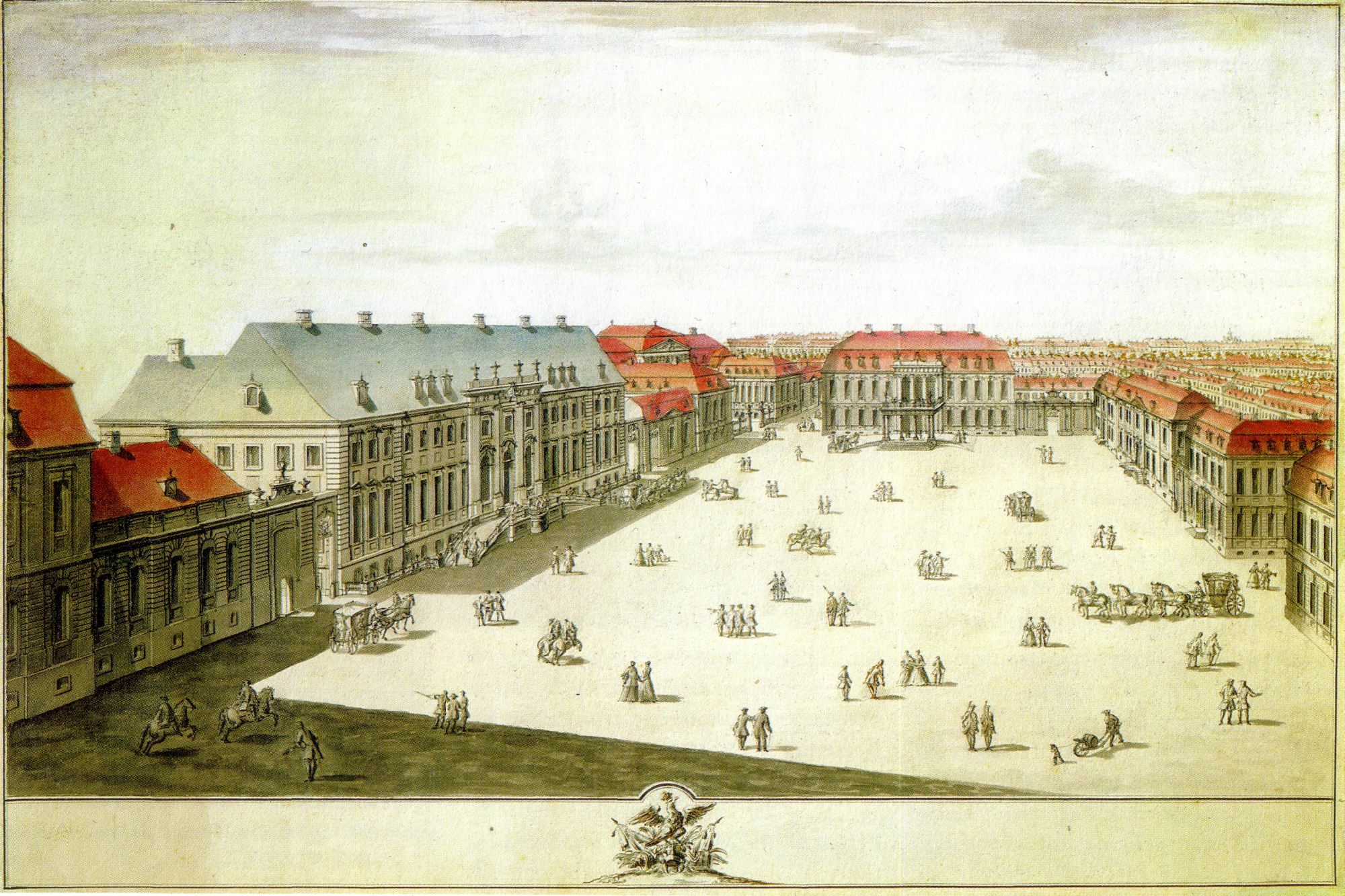
Wilhelmplatz in Berlin

He also designed three mayor squares in Friedrichstadt: Pariser Platz (Quarree), Leipziger Platz (Oktogon) and Mehringplatz (Rondell). The Garnisonkirche in Potsdam was his major work as an architect. Its ruin was demolished in 1963, the church is currently being rebuilt.

He retired in April 1737 for health reasons, succeeded by Titus de Favre. He died in Berlin.

== Works ==
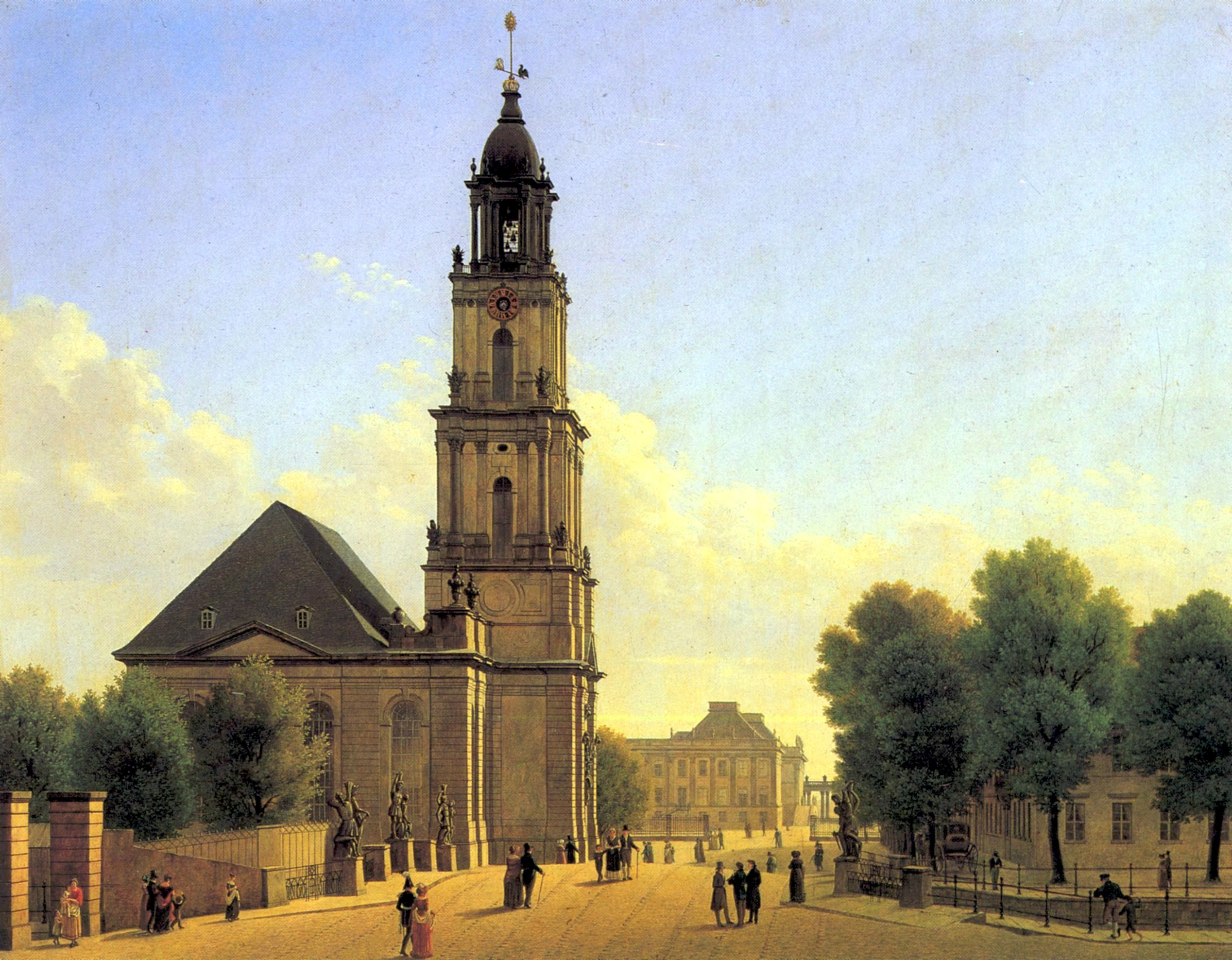
Garrison Church (Garnisonkirche) in Potsdam

- 1710–1713 Charlottenburg municipal church, later called Luisenkirche, completed by Martin Böhme, in 1821 with a new steeple by Karl Friedrich Schinkel
- 1712–1713 Sophienkirche in Berlin
- 1713–1714 Church tower of Parochialkirche in Berlin
- 1721–1722 Garnisonkirche, changed in 1816 by Rabe, and in 1863 by Stüler, not extant
- 1721–1724 St. Nikolai in Potsdam, burnt in 1795
- 1724 Town hall and Hauptwache in Prenzlau, not extant
- 1725–1731 Jerusalemer Kirche, changed by E. Knoblauch, not extant
- 1731–1735 Garnisonkirche in Potsdam, currently being rebuilt
- 1735 Brandenburger Tor, replaced in 1788 for the new gate by Carl Gotthard Langhans
- 1736 Palais Marschall, demolished in 1872
