= Luisenkirche, Charlottenburg =

Luisenkirche
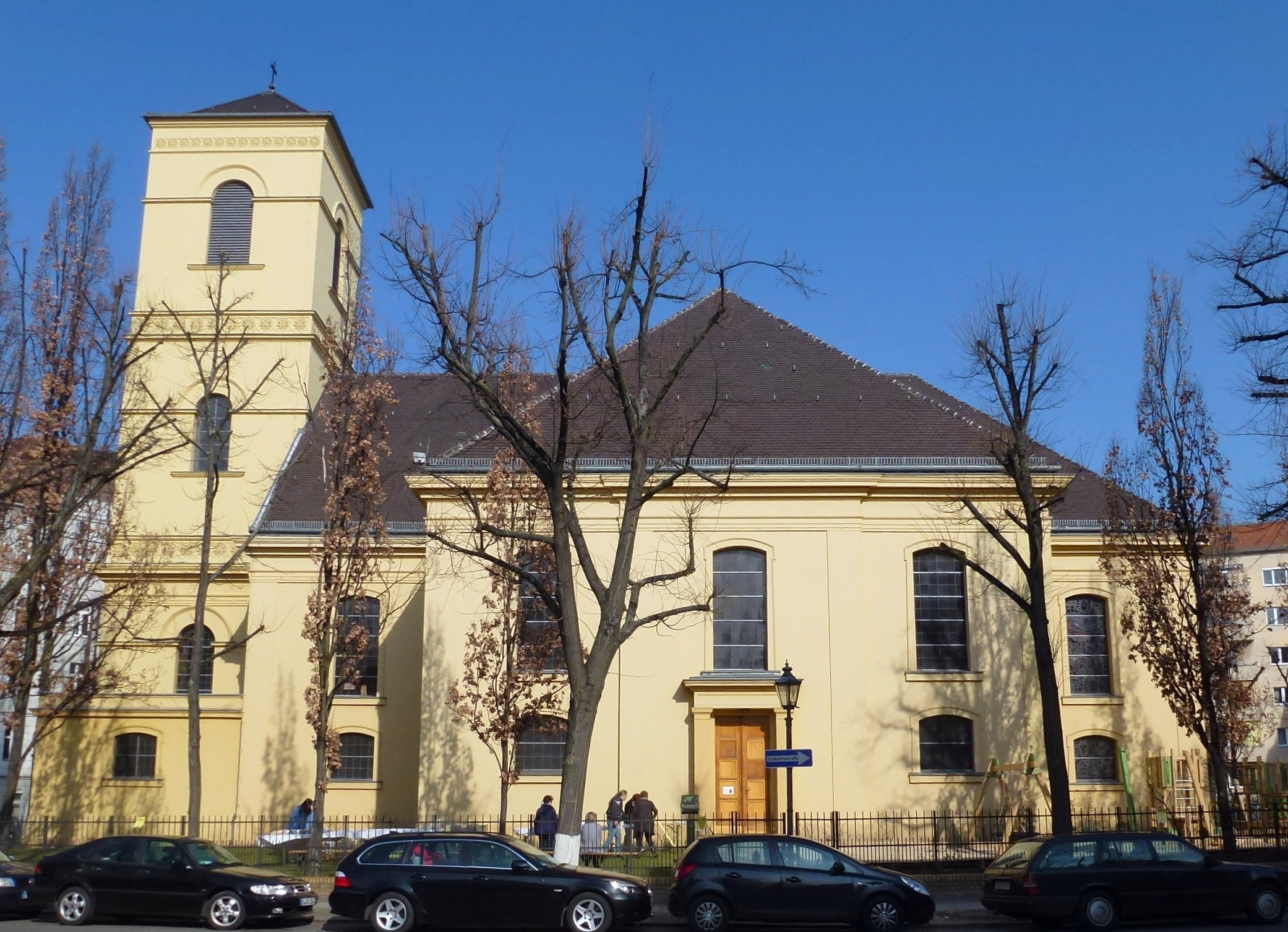
- The parish church, named later after Queen Luise of Prussia, from the south
- Luisenkirche
- 52°31′02″N 13°18′09″E
- Location: Charlottenburg
- Country: Germany
- Denomination: Evangelical Church in Berlin, Brandenburg and Silesian Upper Lusatia
- Website: www.luisenkirche.de

Architecture
- Architects: Philipp Gerlach; Karl Friedrich Schinkel
- Style: Baroque

The Luisenkirche is a Protestant municipal and parish church in Charlottenburg, now part of Berlin, Germany. The original building in Baroque style was begun in 1710, and around 100 years later named after Queen Luise of Prussia. Karl Friedrich Schinkel made suggestions for the addition of a steeple and interior changes in 1821, which were partly carried out from 1823. The Luisenkirche burned down in World War II and was rebuilt in the 1950s. A restoration in 1987/88 revived some of Schinkel's design.

== History ==
Charlottenburg, the location of the royal Schloss Charlottenburg, was made a town in 1705. The cornerstone of the church, the first church in town, was laid on 13 July 1712. King Frederick I of Prussia who had decreed to grant the citizens a church and finance it, said on the occasion: "Friedrich der Erste, König in Preußen, gewährt eine größere und eigene Stätte zur Abhaltung des Gottesdienstes und lässt diese Parochialkirche auf seine Kosten erbauen und für immer abwechselnd dem Kultus beider protestantischen Bekenntnisse geweiht sein." (Frederic I, King in Prussia, grants a larger and dedicated place to hold worship, and has this parish church built at his expense, and forever dedicated to the cult of both Protestant confessions [i.e. Lutheran and Reformed] in alternation.)

The original plan of the church in Baroque style was by Philipp Gerlach, but it was simplified by Martin Heinrich Böhme, a pupil of Andreas Schlüter. The church was inaugurated on 12 July 1716 as the municipal and parish church by Michael Roloff of the Friedrichswerdersche Kirche in Berlin. The building has a floor of a Greek cross. It first had no steeple, but a little wooden ridge turret. In 1814, the turret was unstable and had to be removed. Karl Friedrich Schinkel made a suggestion in 1821 how to rebuild the church, with a steeple on a side. His plans were approved in 1823, but again in a simplified form. The steeple, which holds three bells, was inaugurated on 11 June 1826.

King Friedrich Wilhelm III gave permission to name the church after Queen Luise of Prussia who had died in 1810. It burned down in September 1943, during World War II. The church was rebuilt between 1950 and 1956 by Hinnerk Scheper. In 1976, the exterior was restored. In 1987 and 1988, the interior was reconstructed according to Schinkel's plans by Jochen Langeheinecke. It was inaugurated again on 13 December 1987.

== Literature ==
- Günther Kühne, Elisabeth Stephani (1978), Evangelische Kirchen in Berlin (in German) (1. ed.), Berlin: C.Z.V.-Verlag, ISBN 3-7674-0158-4
- Henrike Hülsbergen, ed. (1987). Charlottenburg ist wirklich eine Stadt – aus den unveröffentlichten Chroniken des Johann Christian Gottfried Dressel (1751–1824) (in German). Berlin: Edition Divan. ISBN 3-925683-04-6.
- Klaus-Dieter Wille (1987), Die Glocken von Berlin (West). Geschichte und Inventar (in German), Berlin: Gebr. Mann, ISBN 3-7861-1443-9
- Melanie Mertens und Hellmut Lorenz (1997), "Kirchen zwischen 1648 und 1780", in Architekten- und Ingenieur-Verein zu Berlin (ed.), Teil VI: Sakralbauten, Berlin und seine Bauten (in German), Berlin: DOM publishers, p. 16, ISBN 3-433-01016-1
- Christine Goetz, Matthias Hoffmann-Tauschwitz (2003), Kirchen Berlin Potsdam (in German), Berlin: Morus Verlag, ISBN 3-87554-368-8
- Georg Dehio (2006), Berlin, Handbuch der deutschen Kunstdenkmäler (in German) (3., durchgesehene und ergänzte ed.), Berlin/München: Deutscher Kunstverlag, ISBN 3-422-03111-1
