= Jerusalem Church (Berlin) =

Protestant church in Friedrichstadt, Berlin, Germany

Jerusalem Church Church of the Archangels Michael and Gabriel (1944/45) Jerusalemskirche (de) Kirche zu den Erzengeln Michael und Gabriel (1944/45)
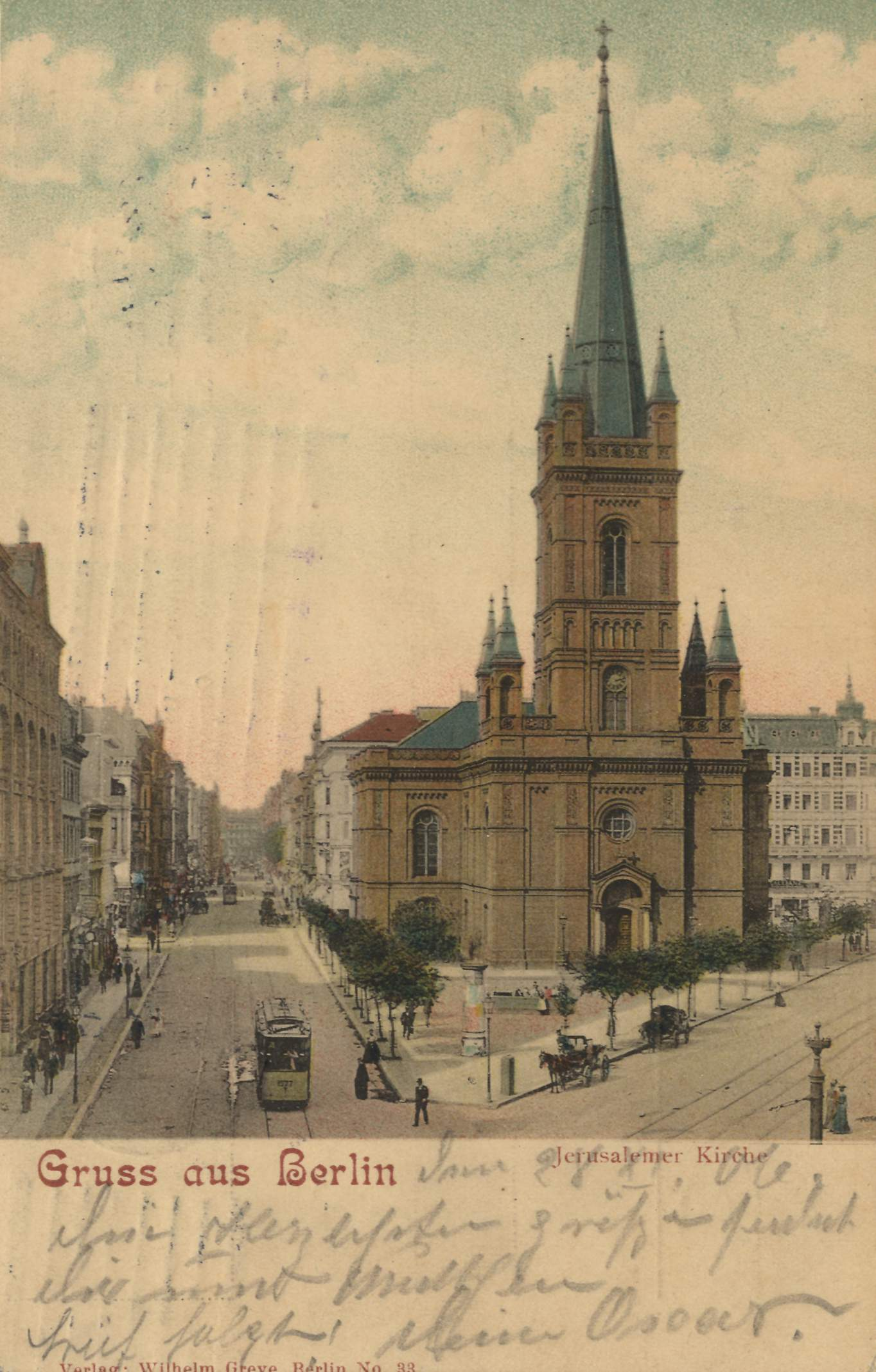
- Jerusalem Church in 1906, seen from south (Lindenstraße), view into Jerusalemer Straße with Lindenstr. continuing to the right

Religion
- Affiliation: United Protestant since its reconstruction in 1968, originally Roman Catholic, from 1539 on Lutheran, deserted in the Thirty Years War, Calvinist (1658–1662), a Calvinist and Lutheran simultaneum (1682–1830), Evangelical Protestant (1830–1941), Romanian Orthodox (1944–1945), then destroyed.
- District: Sprengel Berlin, Kirchenkreis Berlin Stadtmitte
- Province: Evangelical Church of Berlin-Brandenburg-Silesian Upper Lusatia

Location
- Location: Kreuzberg, a locality of Berlin
- Interactive map of Jerusalem Church; Church of the Archangels Michael and Gabriel (1944/45); Jerusalemskirche (de); Kirche zu den Erzengeln Michael und Gabriel (1944/45)
- Coordinates: 52°30′14″N 13°23′43″E

Architecture
- Architects: Giovanni Simonetti (1693–1695), Karl Friedrich Schinkel (1831), Edmund Knoblauch (1878/1879), Sigrid Kressmann-Zschach (1967–1968)
- Completed: 14th century, repaired 1484, new construction 1695, refurbish 1831, total rebuild 1878/1879, destroyed 1945, new construction 1968
- Materials: originally brick, now concrete partly clad with brick

Jerusalem Church (German: Jerusalem(s)kirche, Jerusalemer Kirche) is one of the churches of the Evangelical Congregation in the Friedrichstadt (under this name since 2001), a member of the Protestant umbrella organisation Evangelical Church of Berlin-Brandenburg-Silesian Upper Lusatia. The present church building is located in Berlin, borough Friedrichshain-Kreuzberg, in the quarter of Friedrichstadt. Jerusalem Church is fourth in rank of the oldest oratories in the town proper (except of suburbs incorporated in 1920, which are partly older).

== Early history of Roman Catholic Jerusalem Church ==
A certain Müller, a burgher of Berlin, endowed a chapel in gratitude for his lucky rescue from a Saracen assault during his pilgrimage to Jerusalem. On 18 October 1484 Arnold von Burgsdorff, Prince-Bishop of Brandenburg, issued an indulgence, promising all those helping to restore the chapel 40 days less in the purgatory. The indulgence is the oldest surviving document mentioning the chapel, then consecrated to Mary(am) of Nazareth, the Holy Cross, Pope Fabian, and Sebastianus of Narbonne. The chapel was then located in the fields about 1 km outside of St. Gertrud's Gate (close to today's Gertraudenbrücke) of the city of Cölln (a part of today's borough Mitte of Berlin) on the highway to Magdeburg and Leipzig (today's Axel-Springer-Straße and Lindenstraße).

The chapel was known for its copy of the Holy Sepulchre, as imagined at that time. This structure within the chapel earned it its name, which in 1540 appeared first in a document (Capella zu Hierusalem). Also the present north–south directed street then ending at the chapel thus got its name Jerusalemer Straße in 1706. In 1484 a warden (Kleuser, literally Hermit) took care of the chapel and collected alms from the passing travellers for the pertaining hospital.

== As a Lutheran place of worship (1539–1682) ==
In 1539 Prince Elector Joachim II Hector converted from Catholicism to Lutheranism, as many of his subjects had done earlier. The Jerusalem Chapel thus became Lutheran too, like most of the electoral subjects and all the churches in the Electorate of Brandenburg. During the Thirty Years' War (1618–1648) with its severe decimation of the population chapel and hospital were given up.

In 1680 Johann Martitz, an Electoral Councillor, donated a new hospital dedicated to the inhabitants of Friedrichswerder, an adjacent city under electoral domination, founded in 1658 next to Cölln, a city of town privileges. Frederick William, the Great Elector, the founder of Friedrichswerder, bestowed the deserted chapel as the first, then Calvinist parish church to the new city. In 1662 Friedrichswerder got its own church within the city's boundary, the Friedrichswerder Church.

== As a Calvinist and Lutheran Simultaneum (1682–1830) ==
In 1682 Jerusalem Chapel became a Calvinist and Lutheran simultaneum. In 1688 Prince-Elector Frederick III founded another new city under electoral domination, Friedrichstadt, which included Jerusalem Chapel in its municipal boundary. In 1689 and 1693–1695 Giovanni Simonetti restored and extended the chapel to become Jerusalem Church, which was continuously staffed with a Calvinist and a Lutheran preacher from 1694 on. In 1701 the Judge Krause at the Kammergericht (then Supreme Court of Brandenburg) added a sepulchre chapel for his family to the church building.

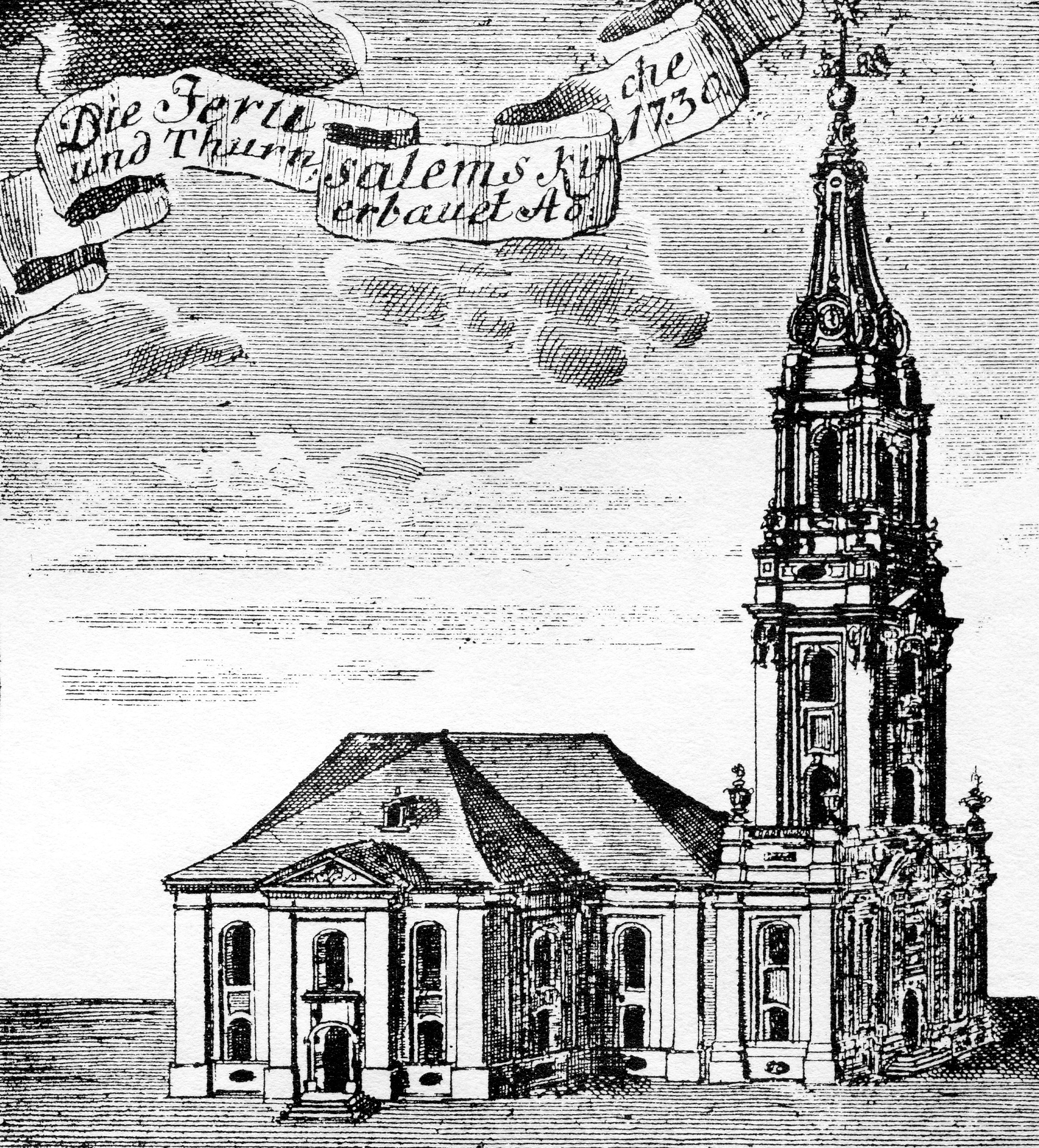
Philipp Gerlach's new structure of Jerusalem Church.

In 1708 the parish of Jerusalem Church, meanwhile too small for the Calvinist and the Lutheran parishioners, was divided, when the New Church, another simultaneum, was opened and took over the northern part of the parish district. Both Calvinist and both Lutheran congregations of the New Church and of Jerusalem Church kept a kind of parish federation, e.g. maintaining common cemeteries, three of which are comprised – with cemeteries of other congregations – in a compound of an overall of six cemeteries.

They are among the most important historical cemeteries of Berlin. They are located in Berlin-Kreuzberg south of Hallesches Tor (Berlin U-Bahn) (Friedhöfe vor dem Halleschen Tor). With effect from 1 January 1710 Friedrichstadt (and thus the parish of Jerusalem Church) and four other cities were united to form the Royal Residence and Capital City of Berlin (German: Königliche Haupt- und Residenzstadt Berlin).

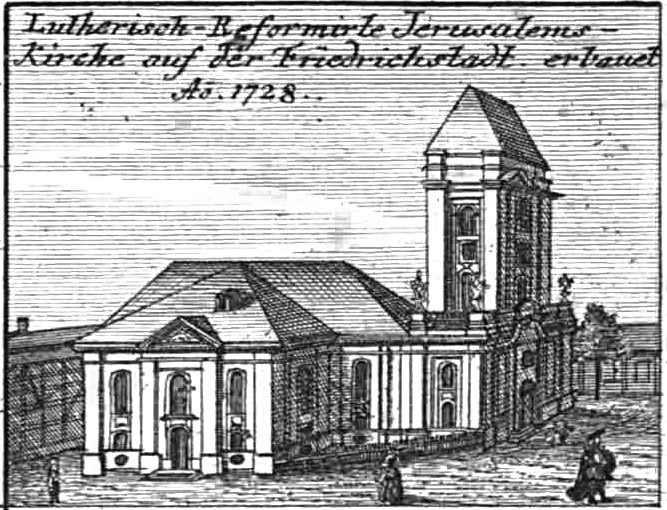
Jerusalem Church with its tower stump in 1757.

Frederick William I of Prussia commanded on 1 November 1725 to build the church building, the foundation stone was laid on 27 November 1727 and since 1728 has been built on the church building. In 1728–1731 Philipp Gerlach replaced the old structure including the sepulchre chapel by a new church building, whose southerly tower had a wooden top, which – poorly built as it was – had to be torn down again in 1747. The tower then remained a stump. Due to the position of the site in the middle of a crossroads with streets entering from five directions the quire of the church was not oriented, but directed to the north.

In 1817, under the auspices of King Frederick William III of Prussia, the Calvinist and the Lutheran congregations at Jerusalem Church, like most Prussian Protestant congregations, joined the common umbrella organisation called the Evangelical Church in Prussia (under this name since 1821), with each congregation maintaining its former denomination or adopting the new united denomination. At first both congregations maintained their respective denomination, thus continuing the simultaneum.

== As a Prussian Union place of worship (1830–1941) ==
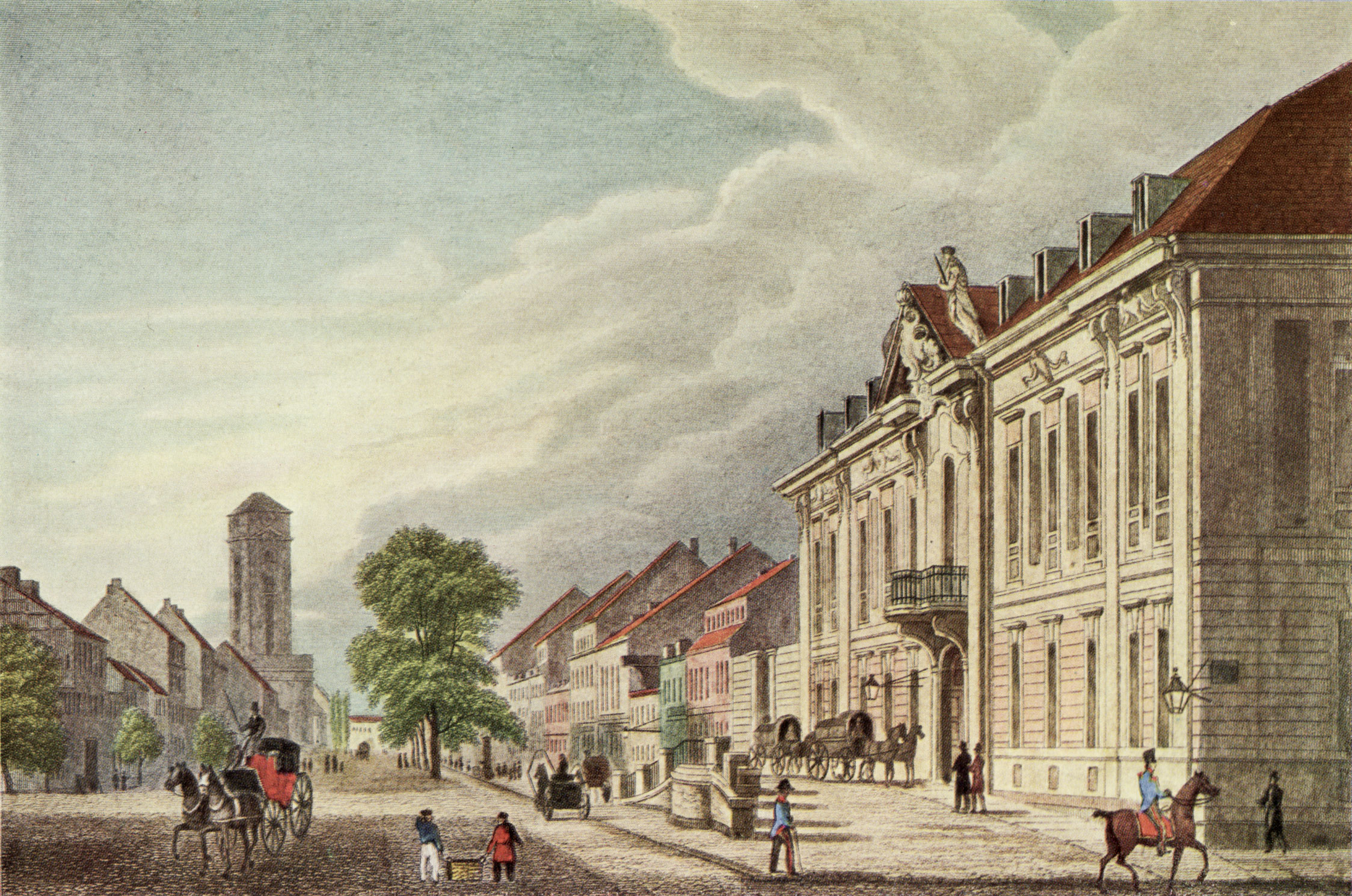
View in 1850 from the Collegiengebäude (Brandenburg Consistory and Kammergericht joint office building) northeastwards through Lindenstraße towards the tower stump of Jerusalem Church before its refurbish in 1878.

In 1830 the congregations merged and adopted the new denomination of the Prussian Union. The parish federation with the congregations of the New Church ended then. In 1838 – maybe as reward for adopting the Union – Karl Friedrich Schinkel rebuilt the church on state expenses and added a new tower top, reaching the height of 72 m.

In 1878/1879 Edmund Knoblauch completely restructured Jerusalem Church, only keeping its curtain walls, which were covered with a new layer of yellow bricks and decorated with terracotta forms. Inside the prayer hall were 1,400 seats, illuminated by stained glass windows and covered by a structured wooden ceiling. In the following years the congregation lost many of its parishioners because its parish became commercialised and huge edifices of publishing houses and insurances gradually superseded the prior residential buildings. The number of parishioners shrunk to 10,000 (1933), then considered a small number for an urban congregation. Thus in July 1933 the congregation reunited with that of the New Church, reducing the number of pastors at Jerusalem Church from two to one.

=== During the Struggle of the Churches ===
During the Third Reich the congregation and the umbrella, to which it belonged, fell into deep disunity (For the general outline see Evangelical Church of the old-Prussian Union and Struggle of the Churches). The polarisation within the old-Prussian Church started already before the Nazi takeover in 1933. In the orderly election of the presbyters and synodals on 13 November 1932 the Nazi Faith Movement of German Christians ran for the first time for seats in the presbyteries of the congregations and synods of the old-Prussian church body. The Positive Union, a conservative Kirchenpartei with traditions back in the 19th century, had no candidates running for presbytership in the congregation of Jerusalem Church, thus many nationalist parishioners rather voted for the German Christians. Among the congregations in the inner city of Berlin that of Jerusalem Church was one of the four, where the German Christians gained already at this time a, narrow though, majority of the seats in the presbytery (German: Gemeindekirchenrat).

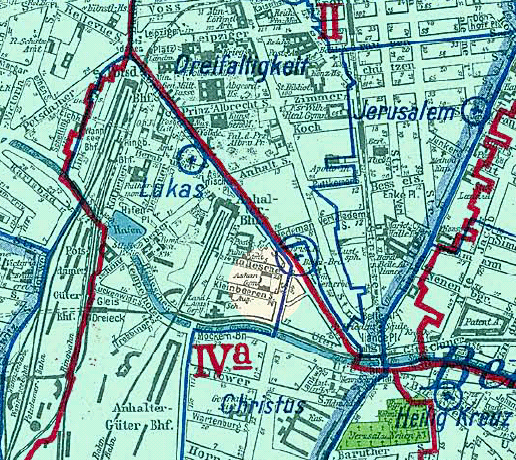
Map of the parish of Jerusalem Church and neighbouring congregations, 1925

Jerusalem Church then belonged to the deanery (German: Kirchenkreis) Friedrichswerder I, whose superintendent (cleric in chief in a deanery) Friedrich Geest (1868–1940), pastor of confidence of Paul von Hindenburg, held an ambiguous position as to the Nazi opposing Confessing Church. The liberal D. Alfred Fischer (1874–1940), since 1901 pastor at Jerusalem Church and opposing the German Christians, and his younger colleague Dr. Rudolf Köhler (until May 1933) had hard times with them dominating the presbytery since 1932.

At the unconstitutional premature re-election of the presbyters and synodals, discretionarily decreed by Hitler for 23 July 1933 the German Christians could increase their share of the seats in the presbytery to 65%. Their presbyterial speaker Walter Hartig, president (Obermeister) of Berlin's professional association of the men's tailors (Herrenschneiderinnung), tried to establish the Führerprinzip within the congregation. Fischer, being by his office as senior pastor chief executive of the presbytery, was supported in his fight by the other opposing presbyters Justizrat Eschenbach, Köhler, Otto Nagler, the director Seibt, and the merchant Zaepke, but Fischer, being already an old man, did not stand the permanent quarrels.

Following the merger with the congregation of the New Church one of its pastors, Dr. Curt Horn, started to also serve at Jerusalem Church and Horn joined in May 1934 the German Christians. Thus in 1934 Eschenbach, a longtime presbyter, resigned from the presbytery. Fischer retired from ministry in 1936.

Soon the German Christians in the presbytery fell out with each other, some siding with Hartig (now representing the radical Thuringian branch of the German Christians), others with Horn, blaming each other to use psychological terror and authoritarianism against each other. Horn, preserving some dignity as a pastor, requested the presbytery to reaccept Martha Fränkel (then living in Kochstraße 62), a parishioner of Jewish descent. Geest sided with the somewhat more moderate Horn, but in 1940 the consistory of the March of Brandenburg ecclesiastical province within the old-Prussian Church decided to completely dissolve the presbytery of the united congregation of Jerusalem Church and New Church, for it had turned – with all its quarrels – incapacitated to function.

After 1936 Fischer still held contact with some parishioners. Christiane Ilisch (daughter of the Protestant literary historian Dr. Heinrich Spiero, classified a Jew, meaning within the Nazi ideology a member of a genetic group not a religion, which one could choose or secede from) and her husband asked Fischer to baptise their children. The German Christian-dominated presbytery denied it to them, regarding Christianity a religion reserved for persons of so-called Aryan blood and therefore to be denied to persons fully or partially of Jewish descent. Fischer thus baptised the children in a ceremony held in the Ilischs' private apartment. In 1941 Jerusalem Church, whose services after all the quarrels hardly attracted any congregants any more, was closed as a place of worship.

== As a Romanian Orthodox place of worship (1944–1945) ==
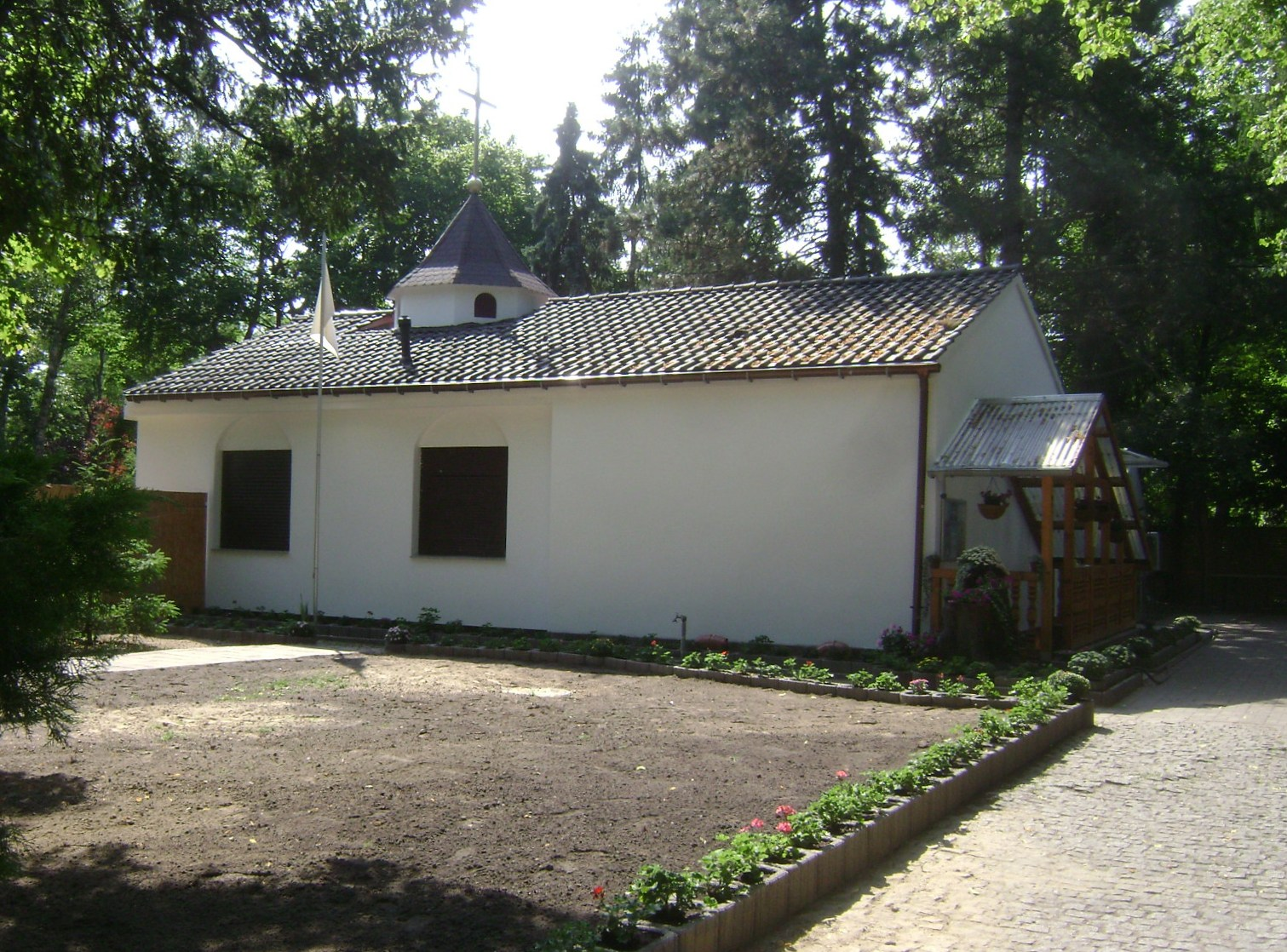
The new Church of the Archangels Michael and Gabriel, est. in 2006, Westend, Berlin

In August 1943, the Kingdom of Romania bought the church building and the pertaining rectory and conveyed them to the Romanian Orthodox congregation of Berlin (est. September 1940). The church was then refurbished according to Orthodox liturgical requirements. On 24 January 1944 Archpriest Emilian Vasiloschi consecrated Jerusalem Church as the Romanian Orthodox Church of the Archangels Michael and Gabriel and celebrated the first service with the congregants from Berlin.

This was not to last for long, because most buildings in the neighbourhood, including Jerusalem Church and rectory, were destroyed in the area bombardment organised and carried out by the United States Army Air Forces on 3 February 1945. Berlin's Romanian Orthodox congregation continued in rented locations until 2006, when a new building was acquired in Westend (Berlin).

== Ruined state and the new building of 1968 ==
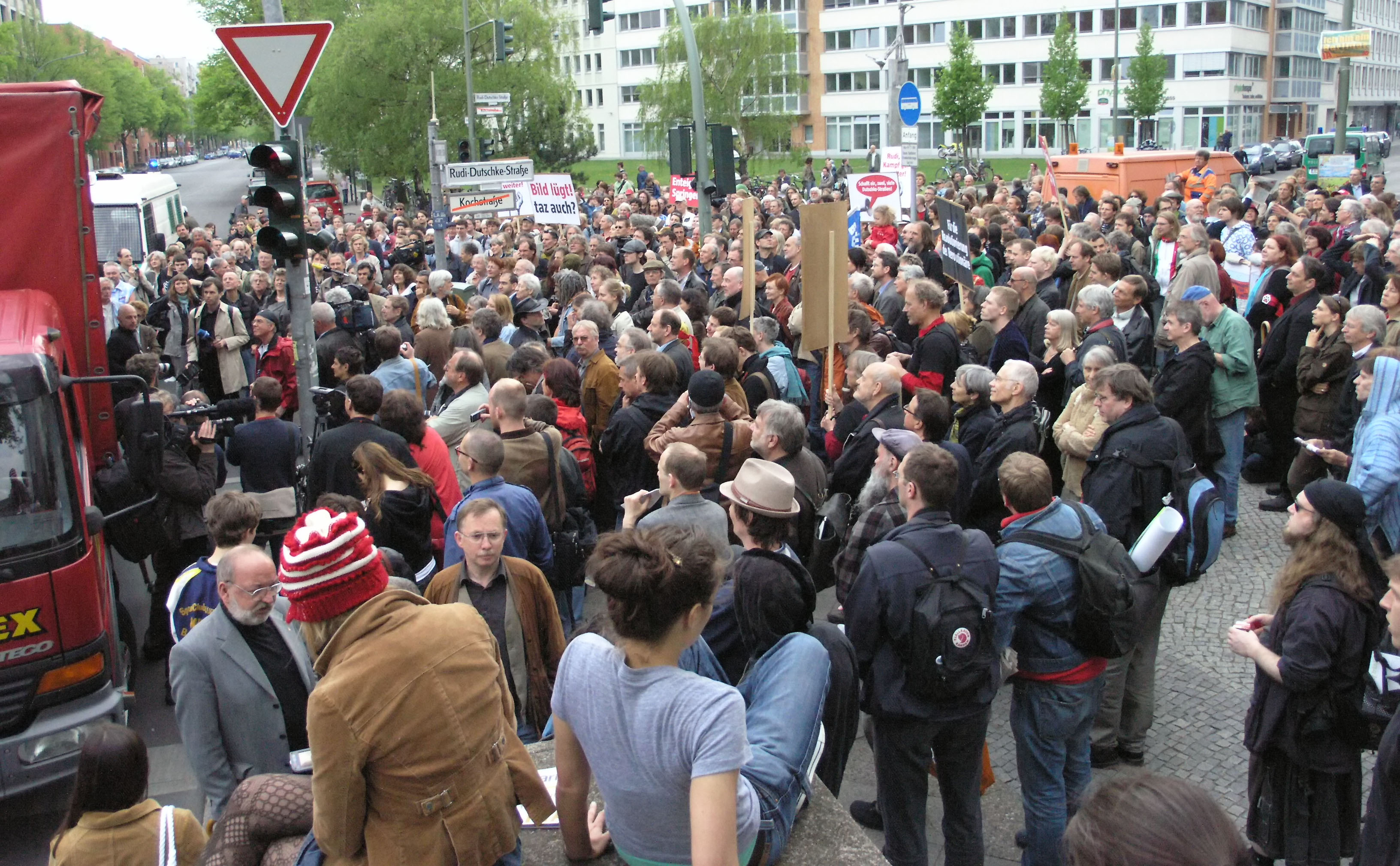
The now void previous location of the old Jerusalem Church south of Axel Springer Verlag during a demonstration in 2008.

After long negotiations with the People's Republic of Romania, the Senate of Berlin bought the site with the ruins of Jerusalem Church, which were afterwards demolished (March 1961). The site was cleared and integrated into the wider crossroads of today's Axel-Springer-Straße (from northeast), Lindenstraße (from southwest), Oranienstraße (from the southeast) and Rudi-Dutschke-Straße (from the west). The access of Jerusalemer Straße (from the north) was blocked by the new office building of Axel Springer Verlag publishing house (1959–1966). The publishing house paid for a little memorial for the church and the setting of cobble stones, laid into the asphalt of the crossroads, to indicate the contour of the former outside walls.

With the erection of the Berlin Wall in August 1961, the parish district of Jerusalem and New Church congregation was divided, with the New Church being in the politically eastern old Mitte borough, and the geographically southern Friedrichstadt in the politically western borough of Kreuzberg. The politically western section of the congregation under the presbyters Werner Gericke, Günter Heyder, Erwin Köhn and Georg Schmidt decided to erect a new church building.

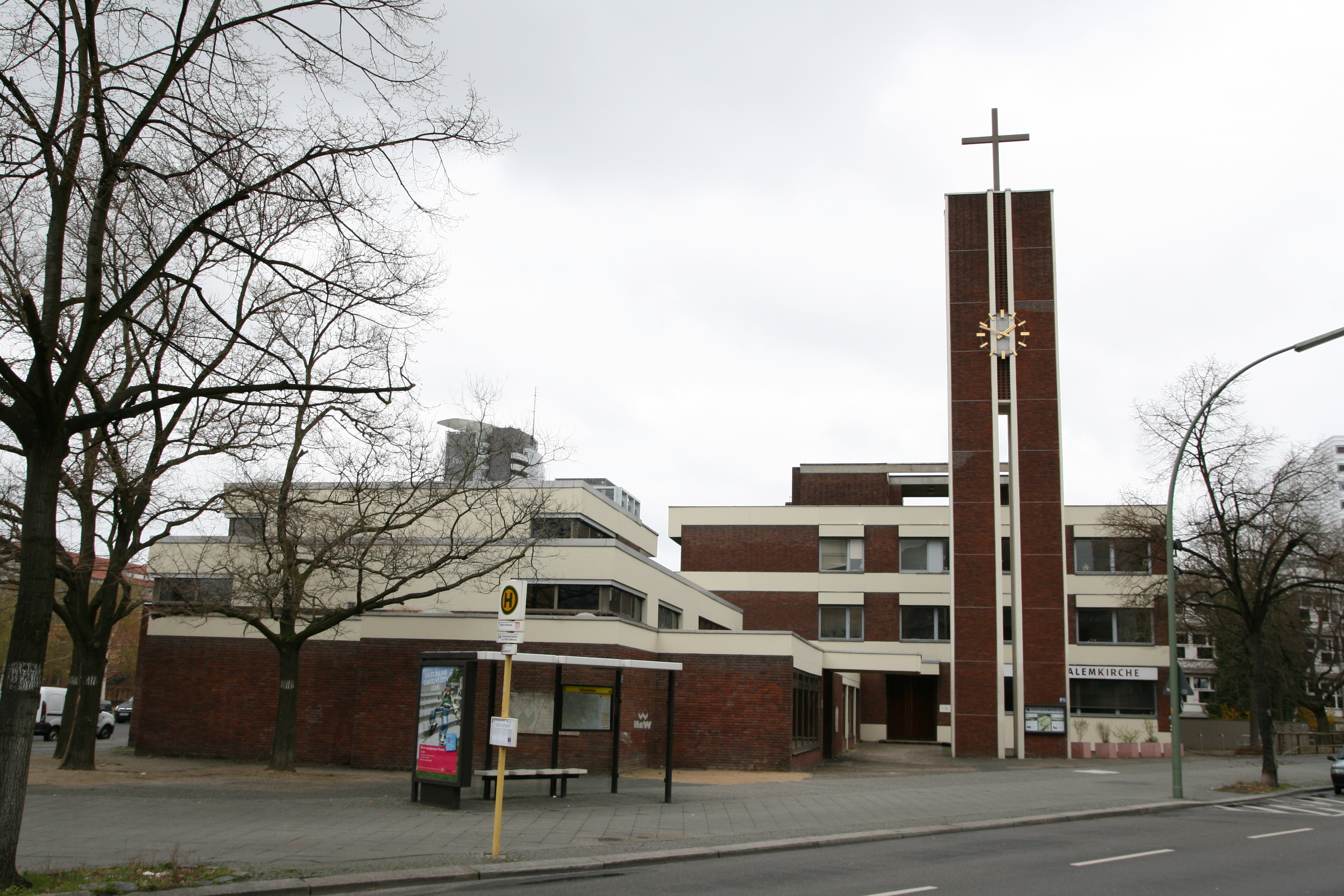
New Jerusalem Church of 1968 as seen from the south.

On the first Advent 1967 (3 December) General Superintendent Hans-Martin Helbich, competent for the Sprengel I (the then diocese of the Evangelical Church in Berlin-Brandenburg comprising Berlin {West}), laid the cornerstone on a site somewhat more south on Lindenstraße at the corner of Markgrafenstraße, diagonally opposite to the now Jewish Museum Berlin (whose entrance building comprises the Collegiengebäude). The architect Sigrid Kressmann-Zschach built the new Jerusalem Church after her designs. Pastor Herbert Kriwath inaugurated the new church building on the fourth Advent 1968 (22 December). Axel Springer donated the campanile and the bells. The walls of church and campanile are from concrete and partly covered with red bricks.

Since the creation of the Congregation in the Friedrichstadt in 2001, a merger of three prior congregations, the congregation does not hold services any more in Jerusalem Church, but in two other functioning churches, Luke's Church and French Church of Friedrichstadt, out of its four church buildings altogether. Jerusalem Church is now used as a convention centre for groups active in Christian Jewish dialogue. Since 2002 the church also hosts the Dutch Oecumenical Congregation of Berlin, which regularly celebrates its services there.

== Furnishings ==
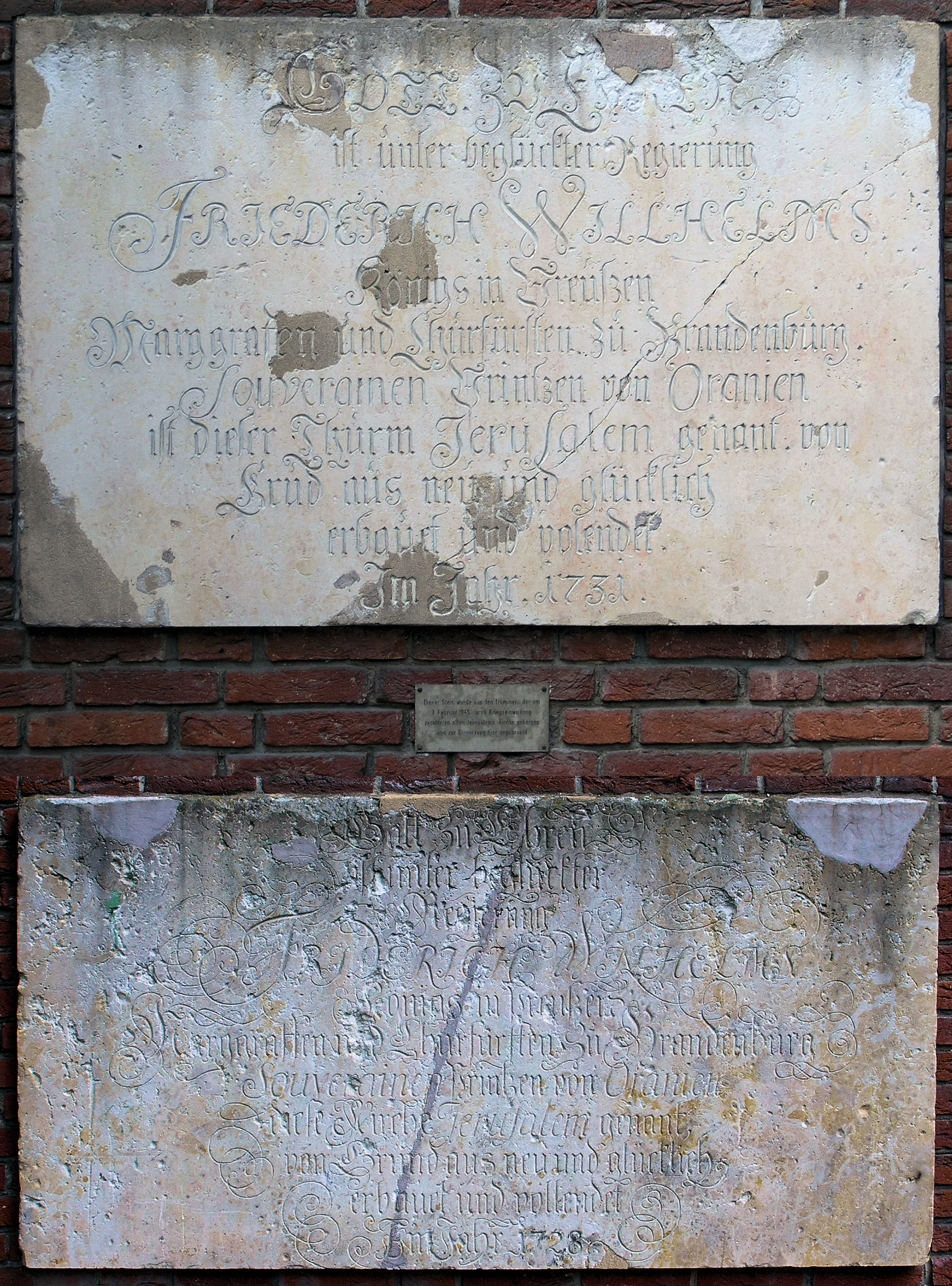
Commemorative plaques of 1728 and 1731, translated from old to new Jerusalem Church

The old church building housed a famous organ, a masterpiece built by Wilhelm Sauer and often played in concerts, which burnt on 3 February 1945. The typical Protestant Kanzelaltar, combining pulpit and altar table, was removed in the remodelling for orthodox liturgy, needing an iconostasis. Other, movable furnishings were translocated, when the church was closed in 1941. The carrara statue of Jesus of Nazareth, created in 1898 by Prof. Adolf Brütt or his disciple Franz Tübbecke after Paul Heisler, from the old altar stands now in the chapel (since 29 May 2005 used as Bulgarian Orthodox Cathedral of St. Boris the Baptiser) on the Friedhof V der Jerusalems- und Neuen Kirchengemeinde (Cemetery No. V of the congregations of Jerusalem Church and New Church) in Neukölln, Hermannstraße 83–90.

The new building of Jerusalem Church houses a Jugendstil altar crucifix, which in 1942 goldsmith H. J. Wilm donated for the New Church, further two altar candlesticks from New Church and the 1838-created christening bowl from old Jerusalem Church (donated by Luise Brandenburg, née Wassmannsdorf). Two commemorative plaques from the old church building are fixed on the outside wall, recalling that King Frederick William I of Prussia commissioned Gerlach to begin and finish the construction of a new Jerusalem Church in 1728 and 1731.

== Cemeteries ==
The congregation comprised many known Berliners as parishioners since its parish included quarters of central Berlin fancy to live in among the better off in the 19th century. The cemeteries still preserve many graves of known parishioners. The cemeteries are each called Friedhof der Jerusalems- und Neuen Kirche and are numbered:

- Friedhof I der Jerusalems- und Neuen Kirche, opened in the 1730s, Zossener Straße opposite to #58, Berlin-Kreuzberg
- Friedhof II der Jerusalems- und Neuen Kirche, opened in the mid-18th century, access via Friedhof I
- Friedhof III der Jerusalems- und Neuen Kirche, opened in 1819, Mehringdamm 21 (near the homonymous U-Bahn station), Berlin-Kreuzberg
- Friedhof IV der Jerusalems- und Neuen Kirche, opened in 1852, Bergmannstraße 45–47, Berlin-Kreuzberg
- Friedhof V der Jerusalems- und Neuen Kirche, opened in 1872, Hermannstraße 84–90, Berlin-Neukölln (close to Leinestraße U-Bahn station)

== Noteworthy Parishioners ==
- Adelbert von Chamisso
- Wilhelm Heinrich von Grolman
- Richard G. Salomon
- Hermann, Freiherr von Soden
