= Neue Kirche, Berlin =

Church building in Mitte, Germany

New Church, colloquially "German Cathedral"
- Neue Kirche; colloquially "Deutscher Dom"
- The New Church on Gendarmenmarkt, 2022

Religion
- Affiliation: Profaned since its reconstruction originally a Reformed (i.e. Calvinist) and Lutheran simultaneum, 1830s?–1943 united Protestant (Prussian Union)
- District: March of Brandenburg ecclesiastical province, Kirchenkreis Berlin Stadt I (deanery)
- Province: last: Evangelical Church of the old-Prussian Union

Location
- Location: Friedrichstadt, a locality of Berlin
- Interactive map of New Church, colloquially "German Cathedral"
- Coordinates: 52°30′46″N 13°23′33″E

Architecture
- Architects: Martin Grünberg (design), Giovanni Simonetti (church construction 1701–8); Carl von Gontard (design); Georg Christian Unger (tower construction 1781–85); Johann Wilhelm Schwedler (design); Hermann von der Hude, Julius Hennicke (new prayer hall 1881–82); Otto Lessing (exterior sculptures 1885); Manfred Prasser, Roland Steiger and Uwe Karl (outside reconstruction 1977–81)
- Completed: 9 April 1708, 1882 (new prayer hall), reconstruction 1988

The New Church (German: Neue Kirche; colloquially German: Deutscher Dom, meaning "German Cathedral"), is located in Berlin on the Gendarmenmarkt across from French Church of Friedrichstadt (French Cathedral). Its parish comprised the northern part of the then new quarter of Friedrichstadt, which until then belonged to the parish of the congregations of Jerusalem's Church. The Lutheran and Calvinist (in German Reformed Church) congregants used German as their native language, as opposed to the French-speaking Calvinist congregation of the adjacent French Church of Friedrichstadt. The congregants' native language combined with the domed tower earned the church its colloquial name Deutscher Dom. While the church physically resembles a cathedral, it is not a cathedral in the formal sense of the word, as it was never the seat of a bishop.

After being heavily damaged during the bombing of Berlin in World War II, reconstruction was completed 1988; the church now serves as a museum.

== Church and congregations ==
In 1701–1708, Giovanni Simonetti built the first church after a design of Martin Grünberg. It was the third church in Friedrichstadt, established in 1688, which was a town of princely domination, while the neighbouring old Berlin and Cölln were cities of town privileges. The Prince-Elector originally only provided for a Calvinist congregation, since they - the Hohenzollerns - themselves were Calvinists. But also more and more Lutherans moved in. Therefore, in 1708 the New Church became a Calvinist and Lutheran Simultaneum.

The site for the church was disentangled from the so-called Swiss Cemetery, which had been provided for Huguenots, who had come to Berlin between 1698 and 1699 from their intermittent refuge in Switzerland. The original building had a pentagonal footprint with semicircular apses. The interior was characterised by a typical Protestant combined altar and pulpit leaning against the eastern central pillar opposite to the entrance.

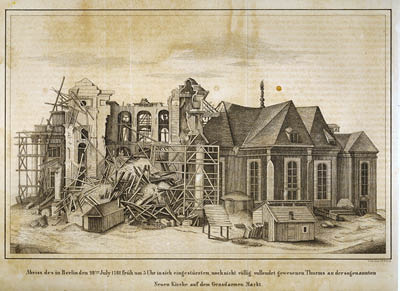
The New Church after the collapse of its tower in 1781

In 1780, Carl von Gontard designed and started the construction of a tower, easterly adjacent to the actual prayer hall. His design of the domed towers, a second one being added to the French Church, followed the Palladian tradition and received the shape of the Parisian Church of Sainte-Geneviève (now the Panthéon), then still under construction by Jacques-Germain Soufflot. The construction of the domed towers aimed at making the Gendarmenmarkt resemble the Piazza del Popolo in Rome. Still under construction the tower of the New Church collapsed. Thus Georg Christian Unger was commissioned to carry out Gontard's plan.

Christian Bernhard Rode created the statues, representing characters from the Old and New Covenant, which are added to the tower. The dome was topped by a statue symbolising the victorious virtue (now a post-war replica). The gable relief depicts the Conversion of Sha'ul Paul of Tarsus. In 1817, the two congregations of the German Church, like most Prussian Reformed and Lutheran congregations joined the common umbrella organisation named Evangelical Church in Prussia (under this name since 1821), with each congregation maintaining its former denomination or adopting the new united denomination.

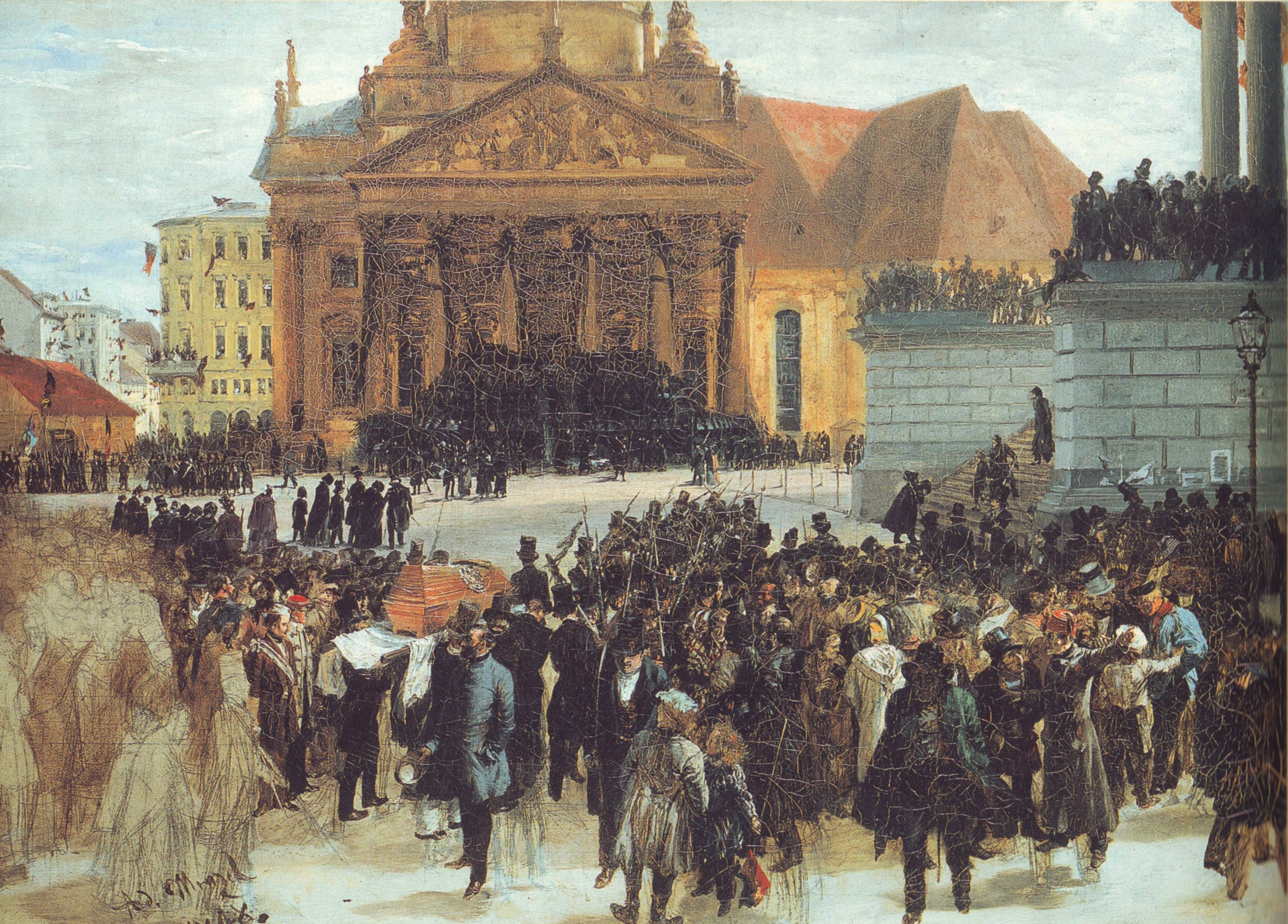
The coffins of the casualties of the March Revolution (1848) at the German Church with its old prayer hall from 1708, painting by Adolph Menzel

The New Church became famous as a place of Prussian history. On 22 March 1848, the coffins of 183 Berliners, who had been killed during the March Revolution, were shown on the northern side of the church. After an Evangelical service within the prayer hall outside an Evangelical pastor, a Catholic priest and a rabbi, one after the other, shortly addressed the audience, before the throng accompanied the coffins to the graves.

In 1881, the dilapidated prayer hall was torn down and Hermann von der Hude and Julius Hennicke replaced it with a new one on a pentagonal groundplan, according to the neobaroque design of Johann Wilhelm Schwedler. Otto Lessing designed the six statues on the attic of the new prayer hall. On 17 December 1882, the new prayer hall was inaugurated.

In 1934, the congregations of the New Church had united with that of Jerusalem's Church and have become - after further mergers - today's Evangelical Congregation in the Friedrichstadt (as of 2001). For services it uses the French Church on the opposite side of Gendarmenmarkt and Luke's Church in Berlin-Kreuzberg.

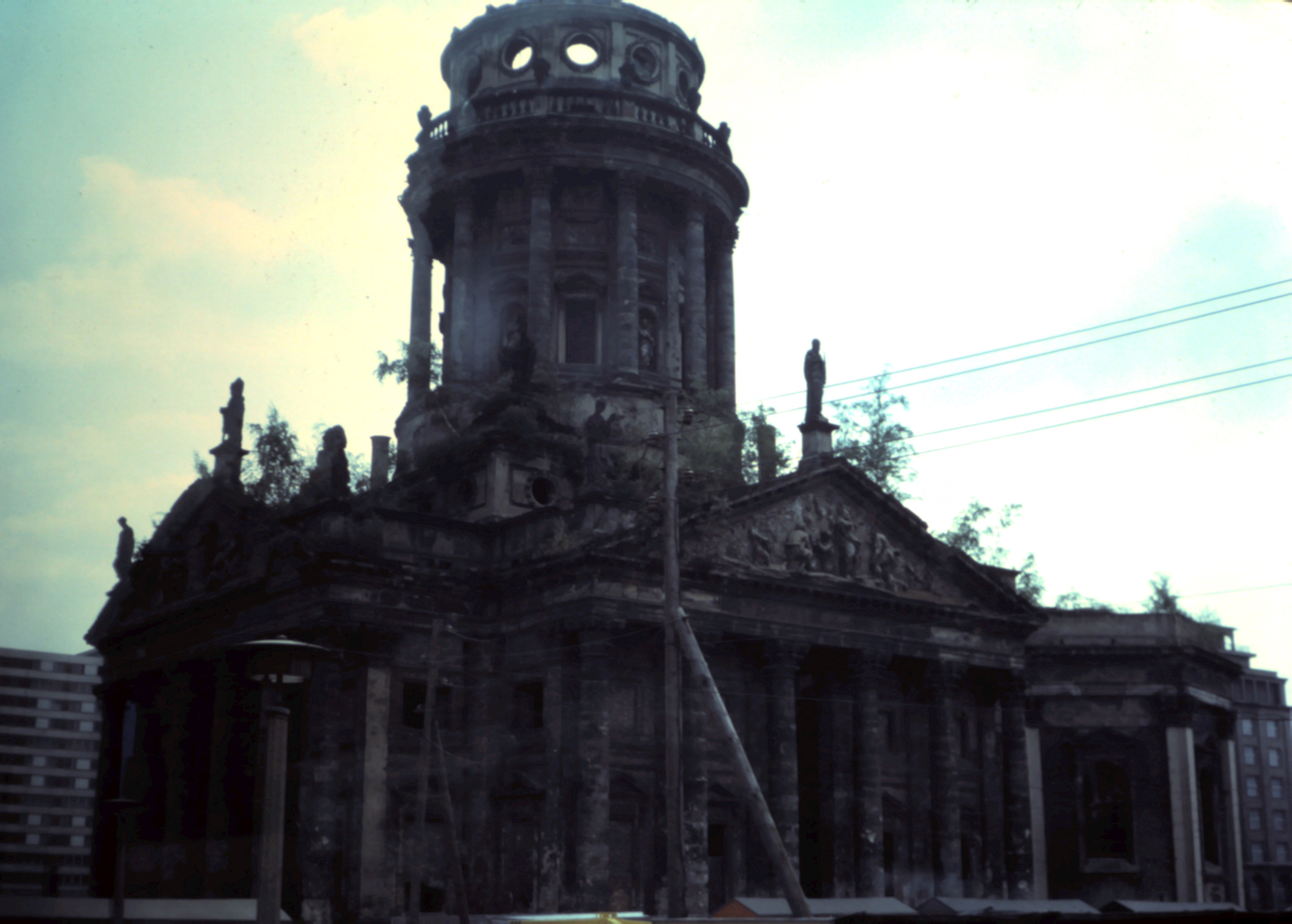
The Church in July 1981, overgrown with weeds and still domeless, its wartime damage still very much apparent

In 1943, the New Church was almost completely destroyed in the bombing of Berlin in World War II and was subsequently rebuilt from 1983 to 1996. Meanwhile, the German government acquired the building and the site. The church building was updated, deconsecrated and reopened in 1996 as the Bundestag's museum on German parliamentary history (Milestones - Setbacks - Sidetracks, The Path to Parliamentary Democracy in Germany).

The New Church seen at twilight, with the marble monument of Friedrich Schiller in the foreground

The two congregations of the New Church maintained cemeteries with the two congregations of the neighbouring Jerusalem's Church (another simultaneum), three of which are comprised – with cemeteries of other congregations – in a compound of six cemeteries all together, which are among the most important historical cemeteries of Berlin. They are located in Berlin-Kreuzberg south of Hallesches Tor (Berlin U-Bahn) (Friedhöfe vor dem Halleschen Tor).

== Noteworthy parishioners ==
- E. T. A. Hoffmann
- Georg Wenzeslaus von Knobelsdorff, originally also buried in the church, later translated to the cemetery south of Hallesches Tor.
- Antoine Pesne, originally buried within the church, later translated to the cemetery south of Hallesches Tor.
