= Martin Grünberg =

German architect and master builder

Martin Grünberg or Martin Ginsberg (born 1655, Insterburg, then in the Duchy of Prussia, now in Russia – between 16 and 23 October 1706 or 1707) was a German architect and master builder.

== Life ==
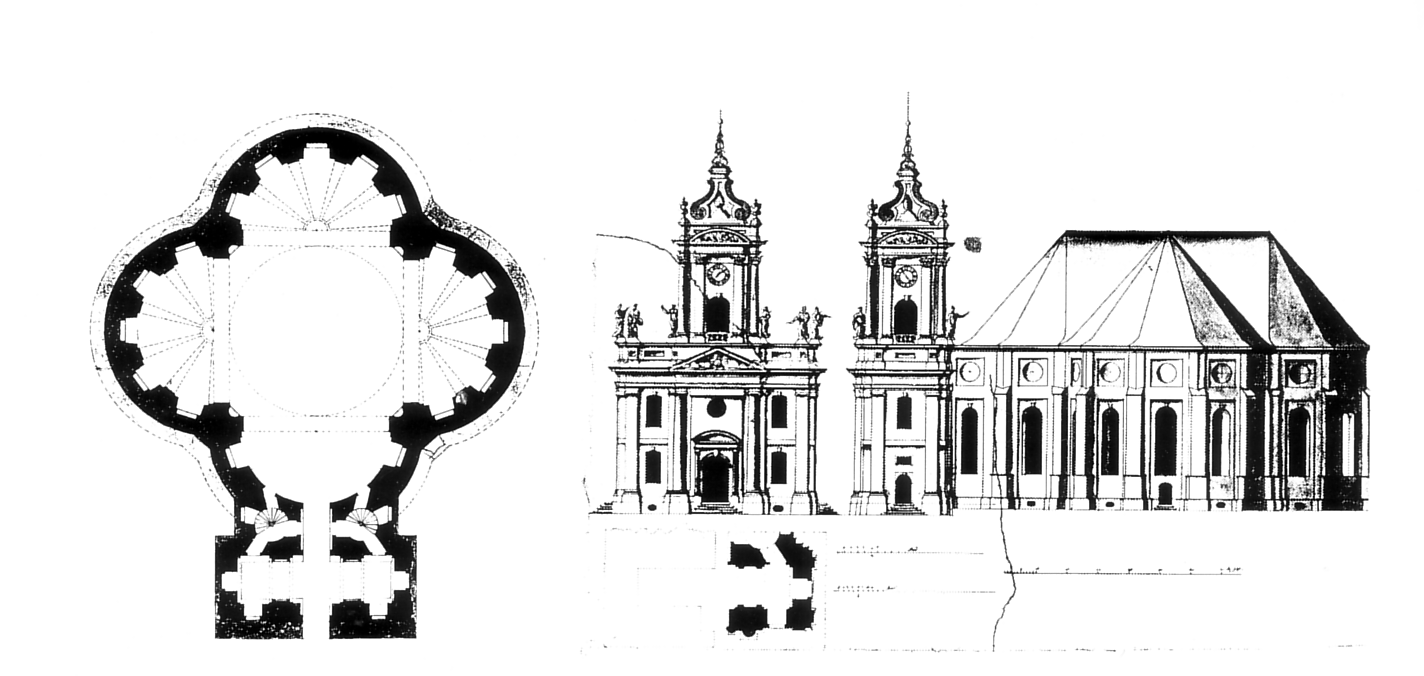
Plan of the Parochialkirche in Berlin

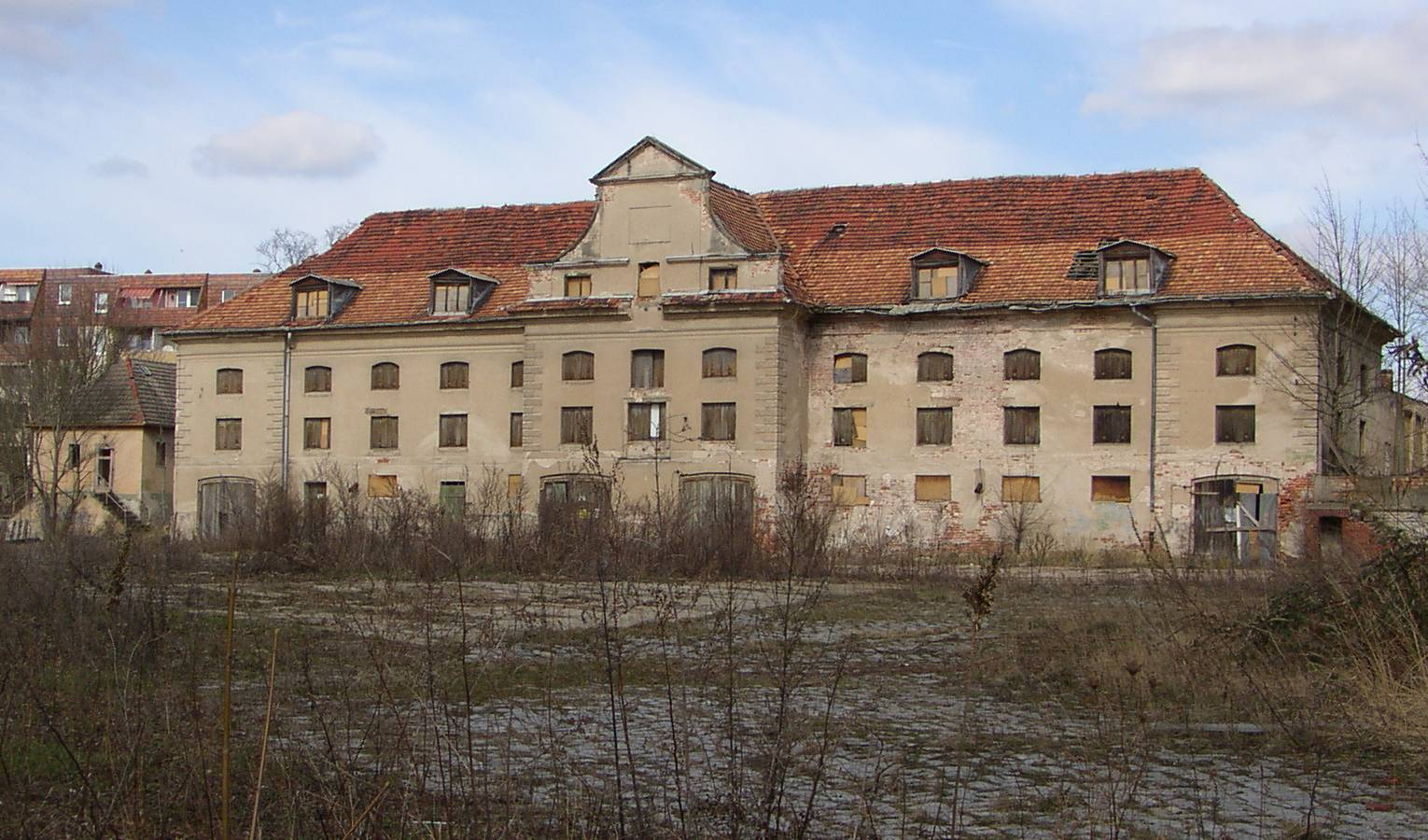
A former hunting lodge in Fürstenwalde

He was active in Berlin from 1687 onwards, after several trips to France and Italy. In Berlin he took part in the construction of the Friedrichstadt and oversaw the construction in the Kurmark alongside the Electorate of Brandenburg's head architect Johann Arnold Nering, who he succeeded from 1695 to 1698, when he again became the head-architect's subordinate. These works included the building of the Schloss and Residenz buildings.

Like Nering he was a representative of the Dutch Baroque style. His other designs include the Marstallgebäudes on the Unter den Linden as far as the later Dorotheenstraße (including the first Berlin Observatory), the Jungfernbrücke (formerly known as the Spreegassenbrücke) and the Sebastiankirche (later known as the Luisenstädtische Kirche). On occasions he was also master builder to Berlin's Zeughaus and the Parochialkirche. In 1699-1700 he built the Jagdschloss (hunting lodge) in Fürstenwalde/Spree for Frederick III. In 1701 he was the first architect and master builder to join the Prussian Academy of Arts.

== References and notes ==
- (in German) Günther Schiedlausky: Grünberg, Martin. In: Neue Deutsche Biographie (NDB). Vol 7, Duncker & Humblot, Berlin 1966, S. 187 f.
- (in German) Hans-Jürgen Wende, Kurt Wernicke: Berliner Bezirkslexikon – Mitte. Edition Luisenstadt, Berlin 2001. ISBN 3-89542-111-1
