= Parochialkirche =

Church in Berlin, Germany

Coordinates: 52°31′01″N 13°24′47″E

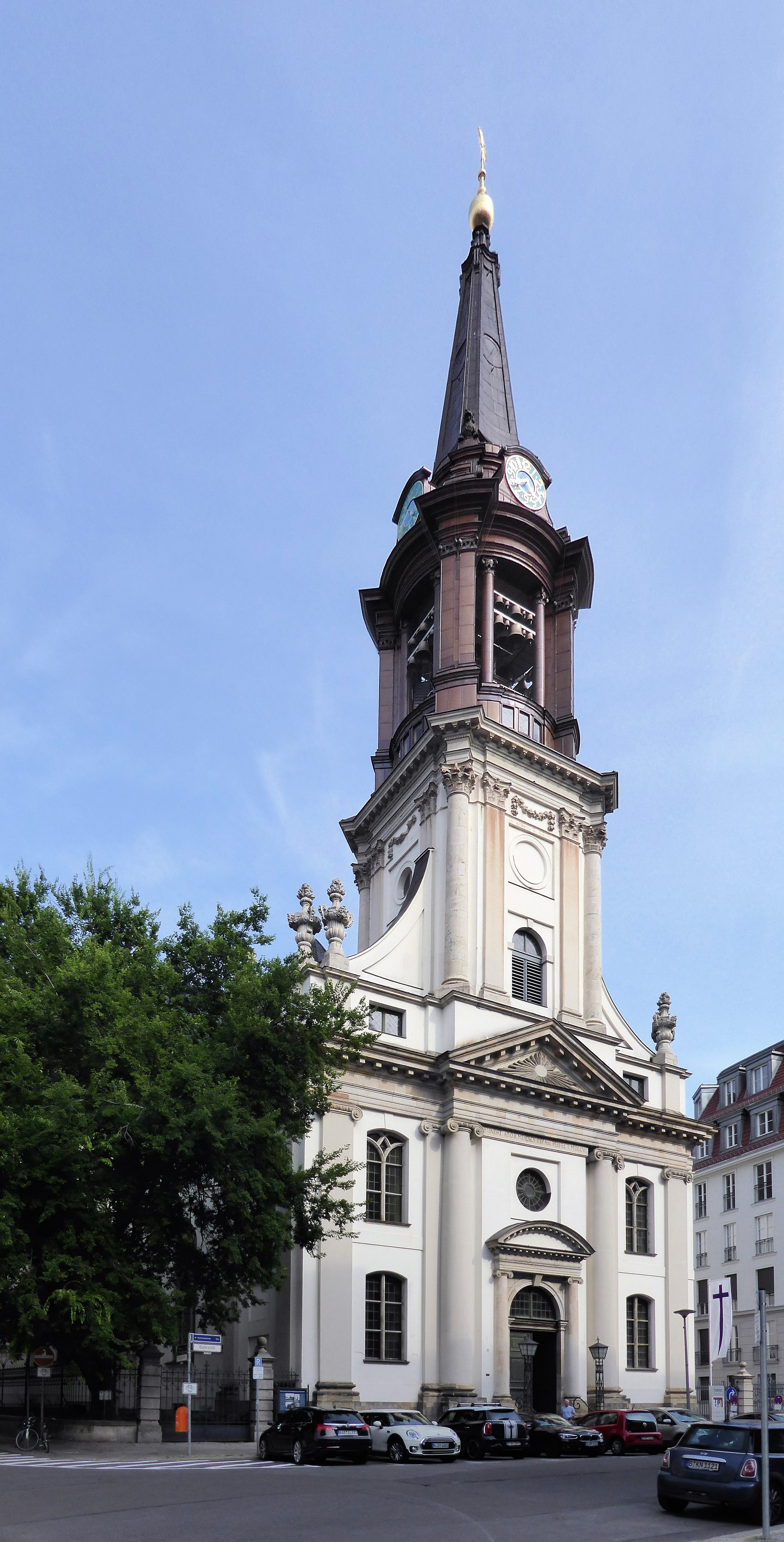
Parochialkirche with church tower, 2017

The Parochialkirche (literally the Reformed parochial church) is a Reformed church in the Klosterviertel neighbourhood of the Mitte borough in Berlin. The church, now a listed building, was built between 1695 and 1703. It is the oldest church in Berlin built as a Protestant place of worship. The church is now used and owned by the congregation of St. Mary's and St. Peter's, the merger of the parishes in the historical city center concluded on 23 September 2005. The congregation forms part of the Evangelical Church Berlin-Brandenburg-Silesian Upper Lusatia, a Protestant regional church body comprising Lutheran, Reformed and united Protestant congregations.

== Name ==
When the prince-electoral family of Brandenburg, the Berlin-based Hohenzollern, converted from Lutheranism to Calvinism (in German usually: Reformed Church; in English mostly: Presbyterian church) in 1613, all parish churches of Berlin, then under the patronage and advowson of the Lutheran city council, remained Lutheran. So, only the Cölln Palace and Collegiate Church, the court church, was dedicated as a Reformed place of worship.

However, the number of ordinary German-speaking Berliners of Reformed denomination (i.e., churchgoers not employed at or belonging to the court) grew, mainly by immigration, and a separate parochial church for them in addition to the Palace Reformed Church was needed. Parochialkirche was the first and initially the only Reformed church for prevailingly ordinary Reformed congregants in Berlin, thus the undifferentiated name. As a Reformed church building, Parochialkirche is not dedicated or even consecrated to any patron saint. The church was erected in Klosterstraße at the corner with Freier Fahrweg (renamed Parochialstraße in 1862) because the sites along Klosterstraße then formed a prince-electoral immunity district (kurfürstliche Freiheit) not under the legislation of the Lutheran city council, thus circumventing the council's objection against its construction.

== History ==
=== 1944 to present ===
Concert for the opening of the clock on 23 October 2016

Firebombing on 24 May 1944 completely destroyed the tower and the interior of the church. In 1946 a makeshift floor was built from the porch into the church, which could not be structurally secured until 1950–1951. Fritz Kühn made a cross from scrap iron found in the ruins, which was hung in the sanctuary in 1961. The last religious service took place in the building on 20 August 1961 and for the rest of the East Berlin-era the building was used for exhibitions and concerts and then (from 1970) as a furniture warehouse. A new roof was put on in 1988. From 1991 onwards the building was gradually restored. Works on the porch and tower were postponed in 2001 and on the nave in 2004.

In summer 2016, the bell tower dome with the golden sun was restored after 72 years and the carillon with 52 bells has been rung since 23 October 2016 from the Parochialkirche's 65 m tower.

== Cemetery ==
The church's cemetery is one of the oldest surviving ones in Berlin and includes the tomb of the Reformed theologian Daniel Ernst Jablonski.

== Gallery ==
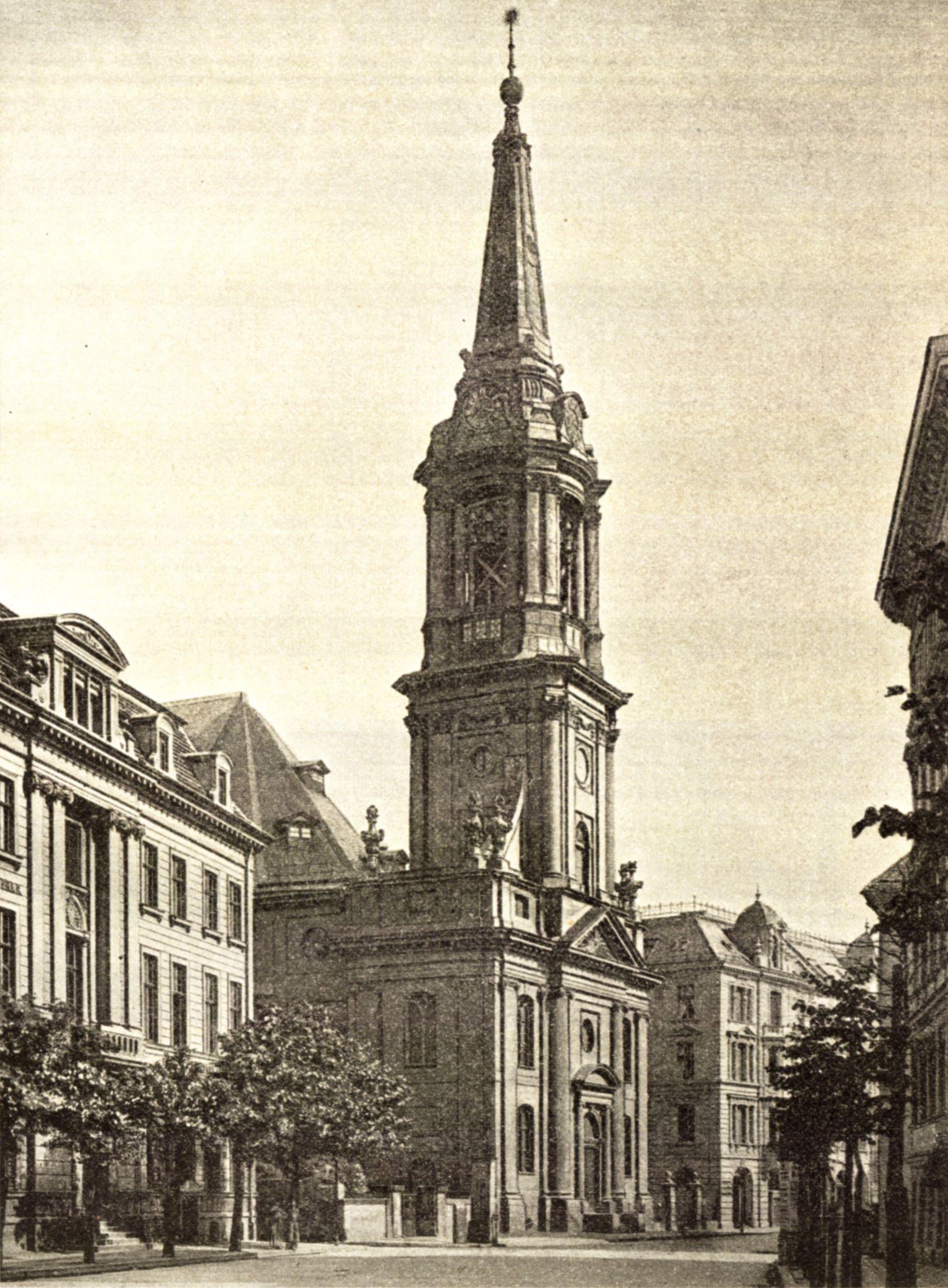
The Parochialkirche in 1896

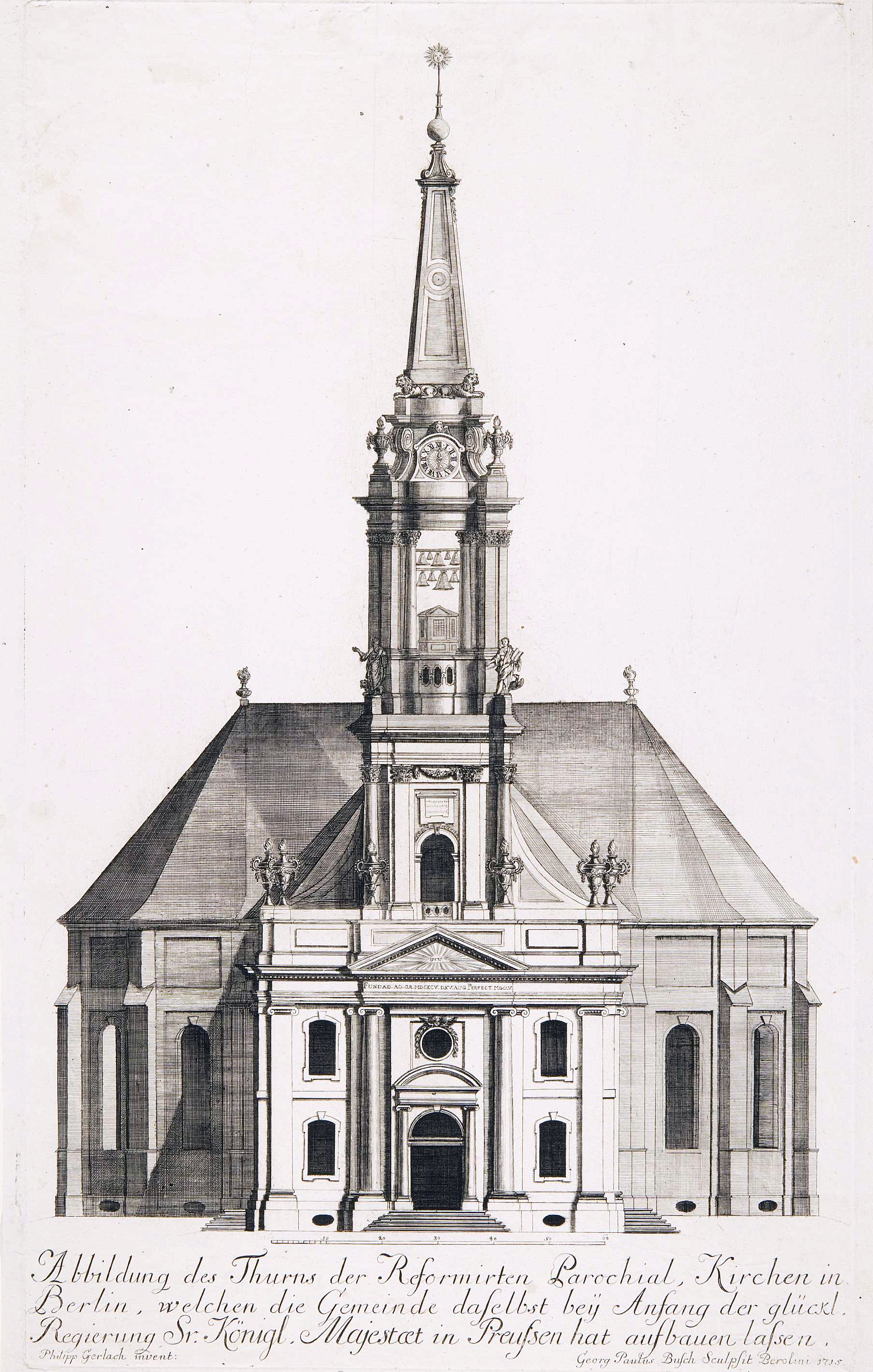
Engraving of the Parochialkirche, Georg Paul Busch after Philipp Gerlach, 1715

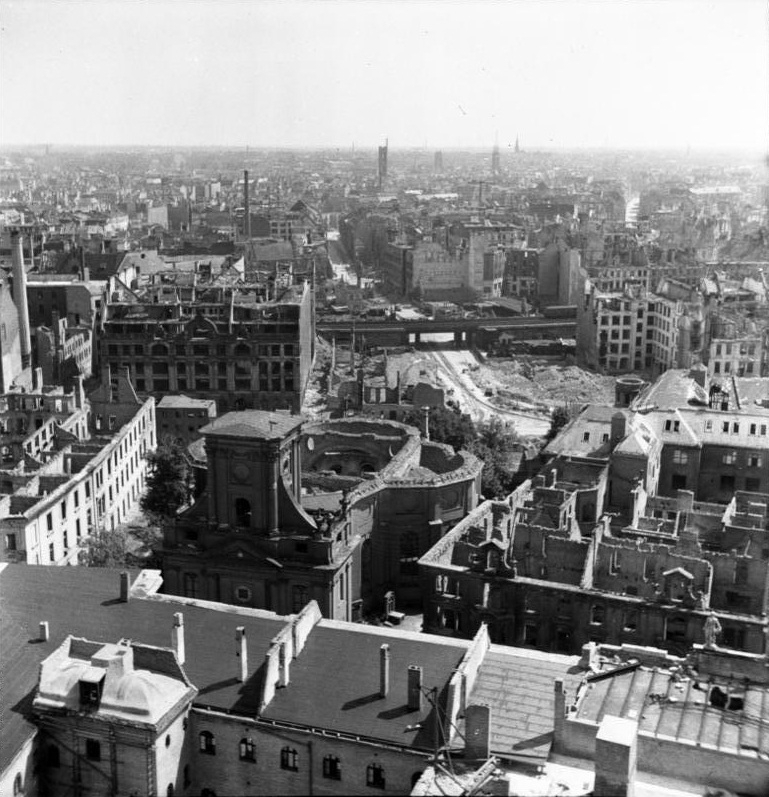
Ruins of the church (1947)

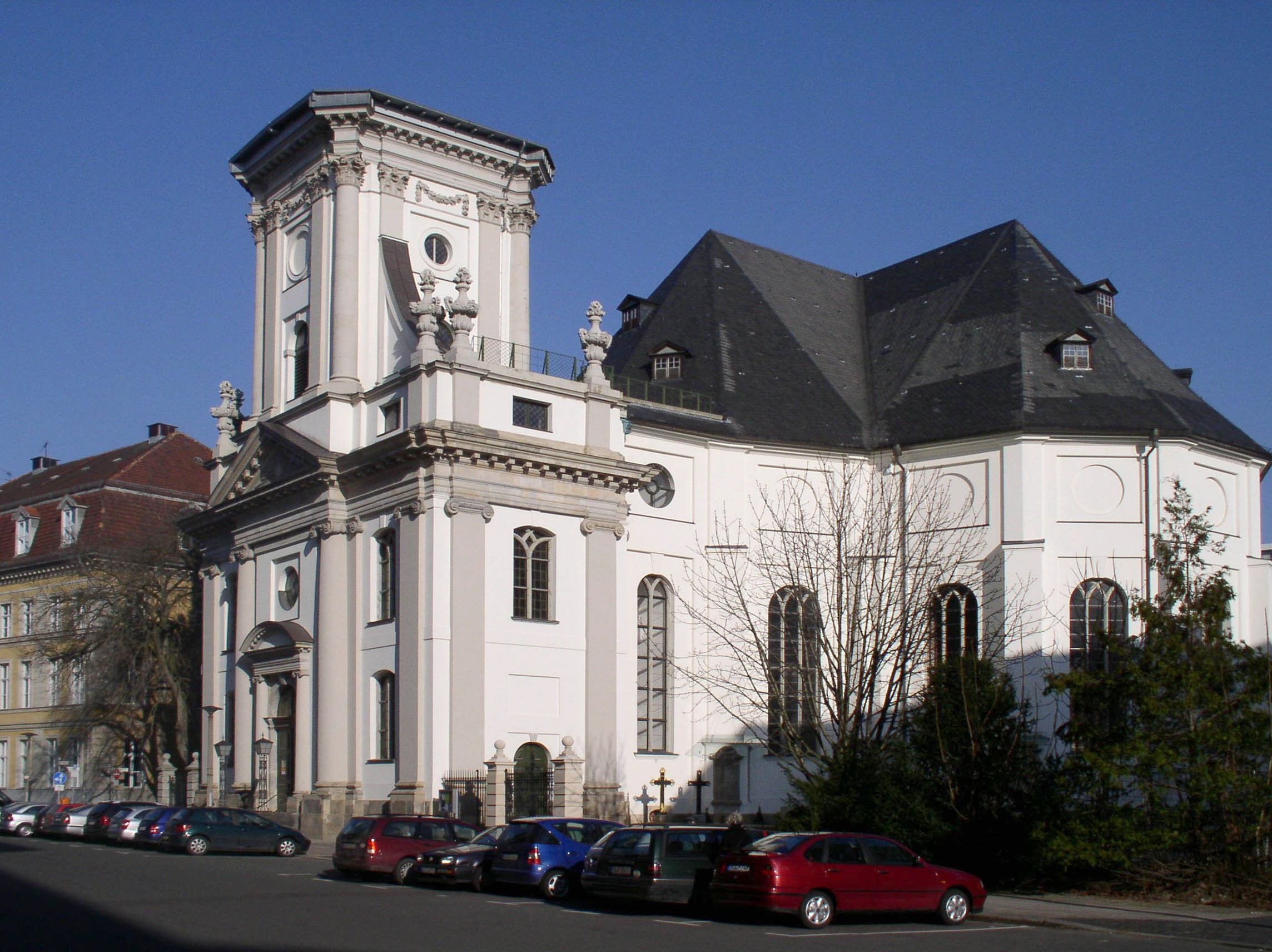
The Parochialkirche in 2006

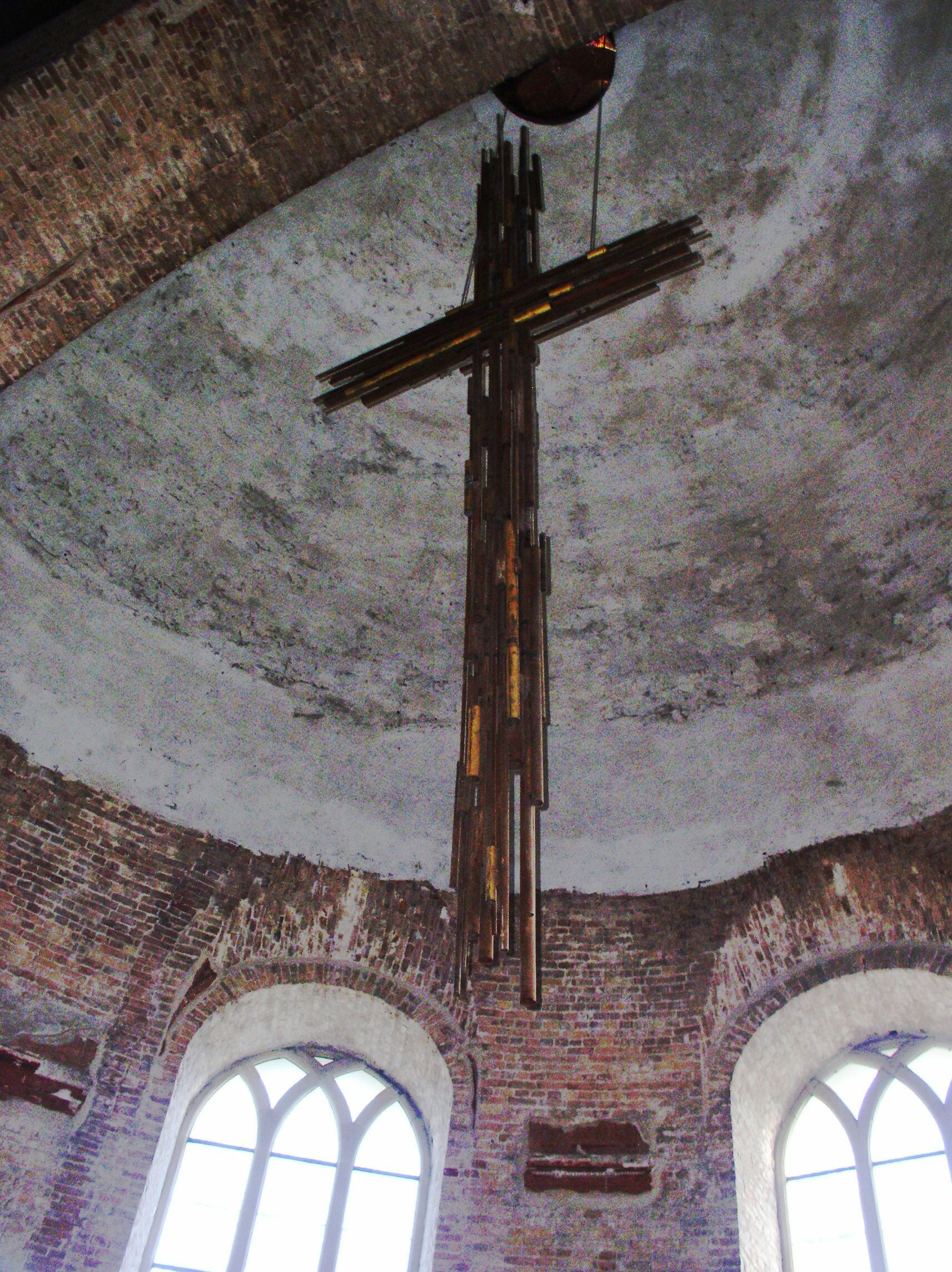
The iron cross inside the church

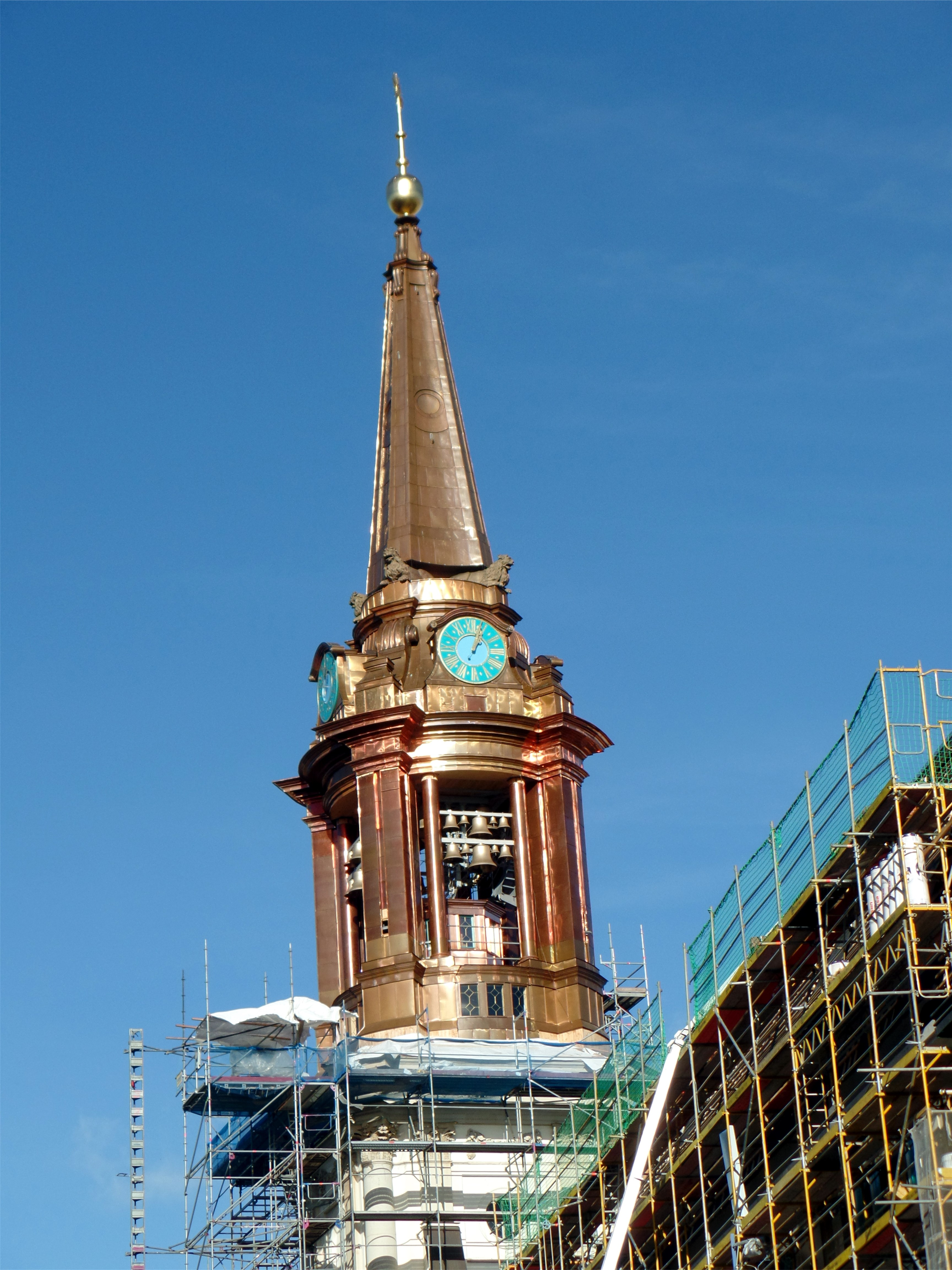
Reconstruction of the top of the tower, end of October 2016

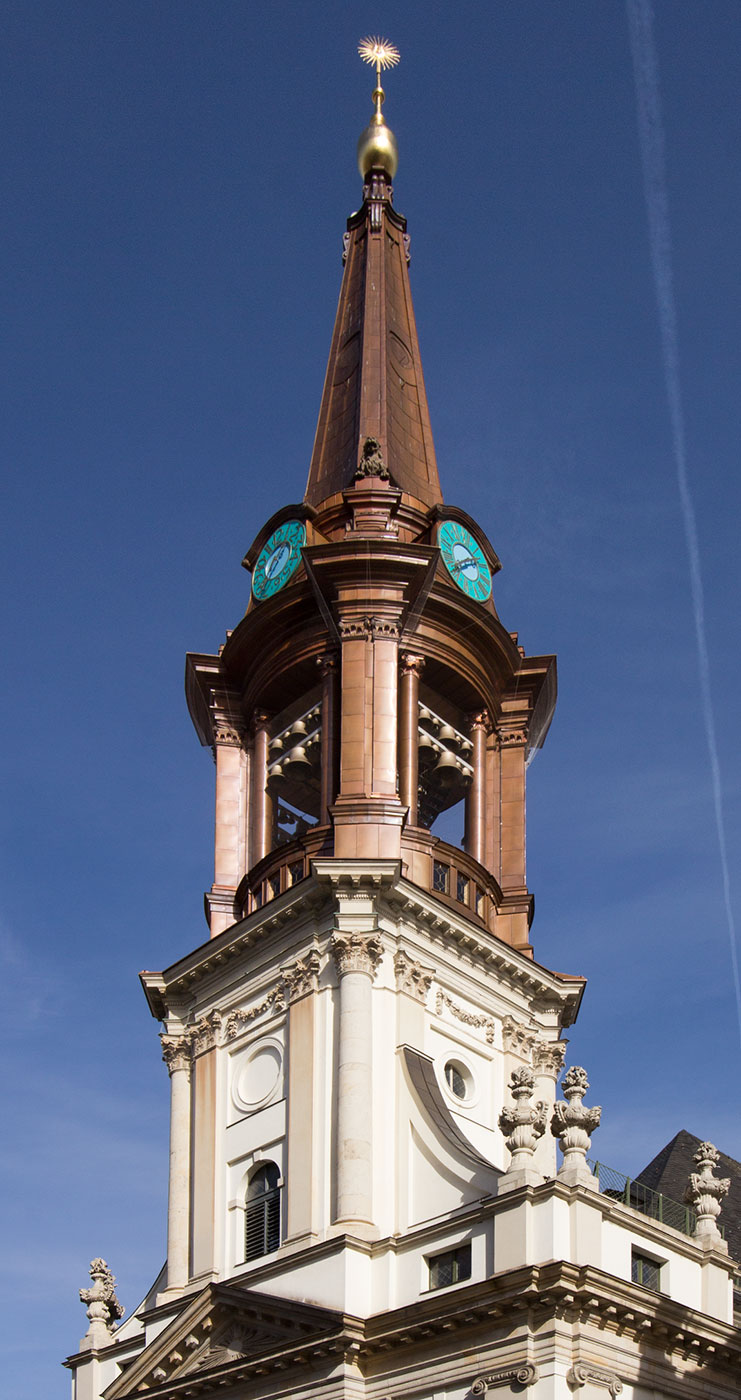
Church tower of the Parochialkirche with the carillon, 2017

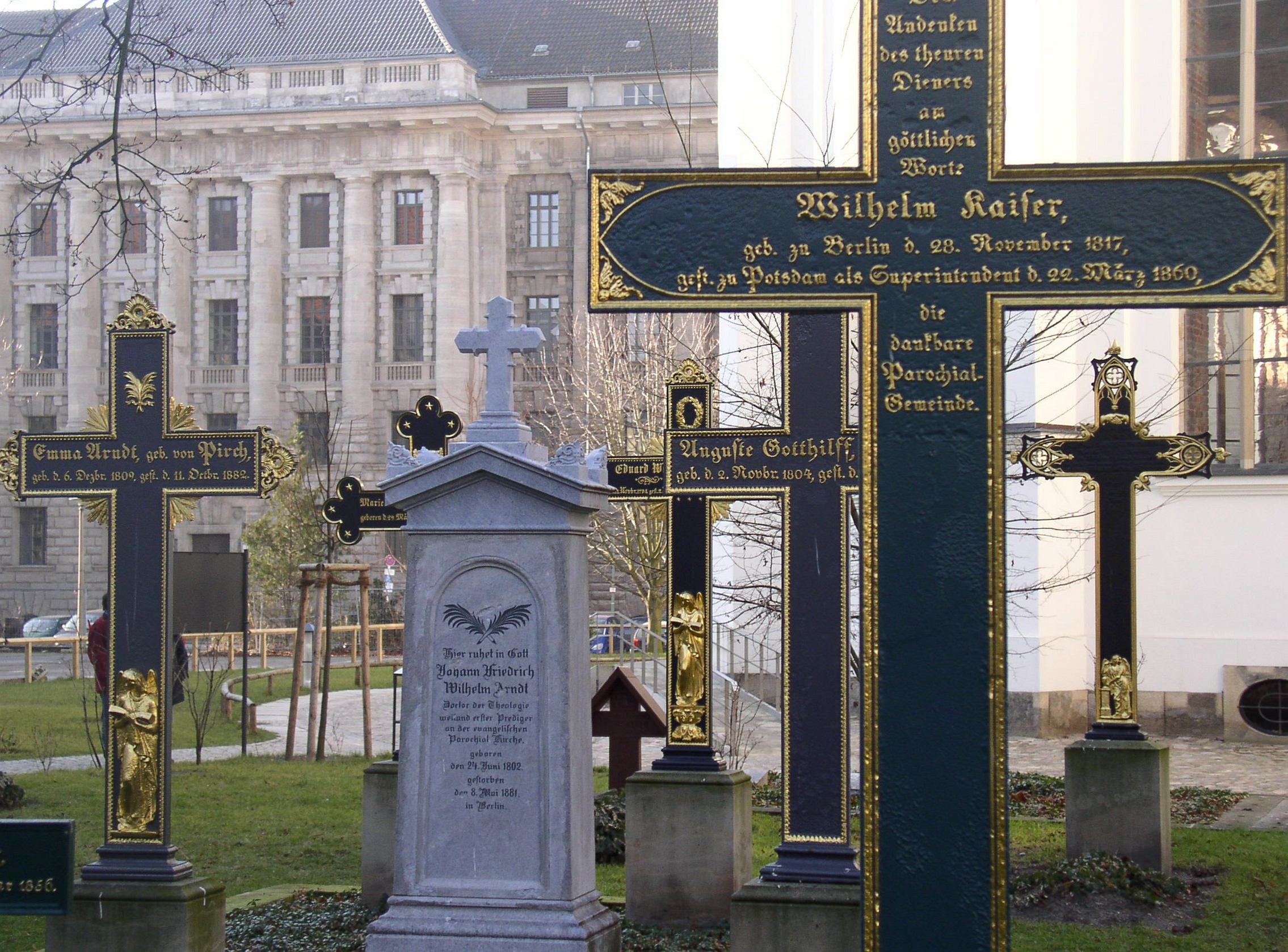
Parochial cemetery

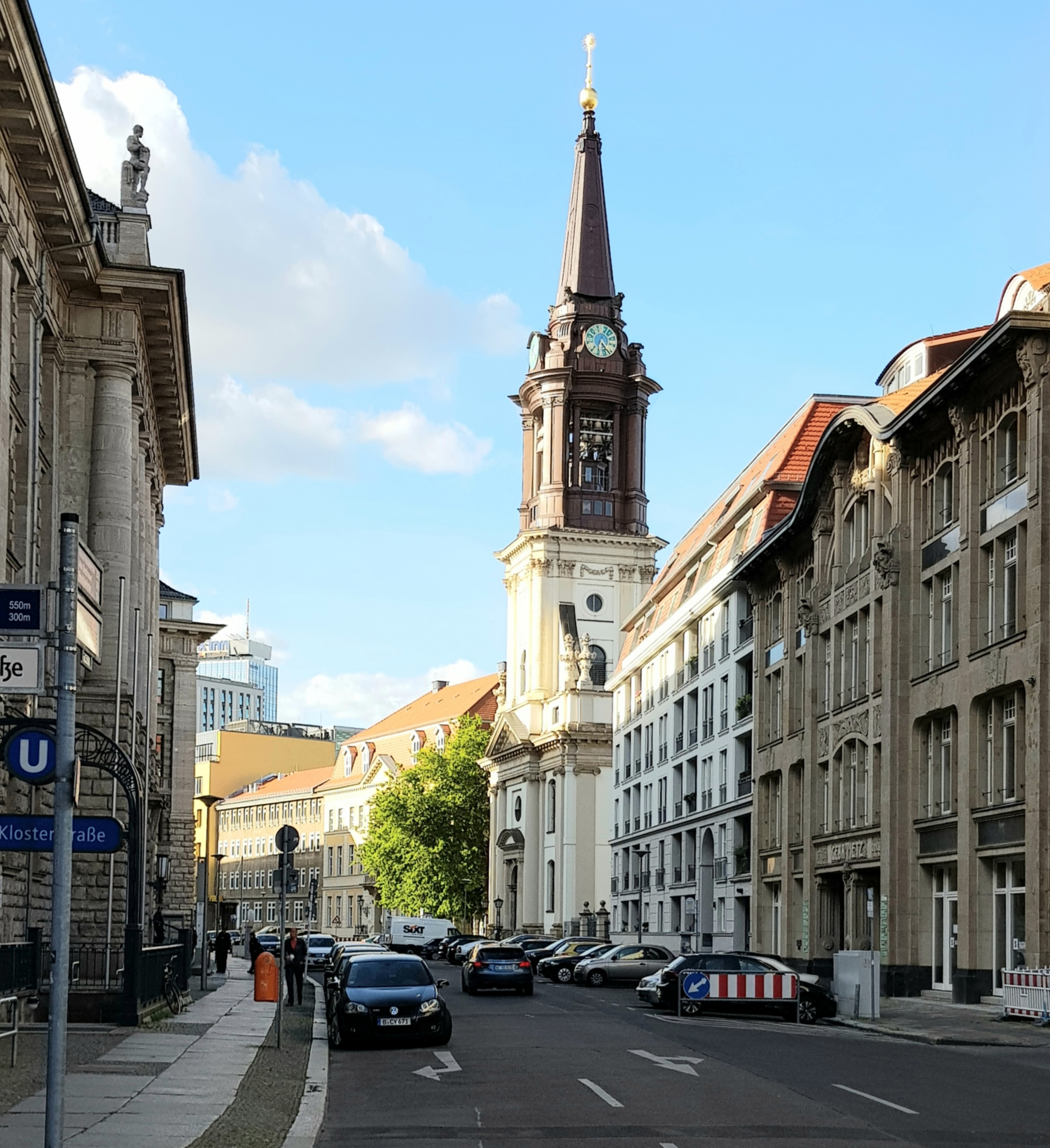
Klosterstraße with Parochialkirche, 2020
