= Thoralf =

Thoralf is a given name. Notable people with the name include:

- Thoralf Arndt (born 1966), former professional German footballer
- Thoralf Glad (1878–1969), Norwegian sailor who competed in the 1912 Summer Olympics
- Thoralf Hagen (1887–1979), Norwegian rower who competed in the 1920 Summer Olympics
- Thoralf Klouman (1890–1940), Norwegian satirical illustrator and actor
- Thoralf Knobloch (born 1962), contemporary German painter based in Dresden
- Reidar Thoralf Larsen or Reidar T. Larsen (1923–2012), Norwegian politician
- Thoralf Peters (born 1968), German rower
- Thoralf Pryser (1885–1970), Norwegian journalist and newspaper editor
- Thoralf Rafto or Thorolf Rafto (1922–1986), human rights activist and professor in Economic History
- Thoralf Sandaker (born 1923), Norwegian former rower who competed in the 1948 Summer Olympics
- Thoralf Skolem (1887–1963), Norwegian mathematician who worked in mathematical logic and set theory
- Thoralf Strømstad (1897–1984), Norwegian Nordic skier who was awarded the Holmenkollen medal in 1923

== See also ==
- Thorolf
- Tora (given name)
- Toralf
