= Nikolaiviertel =

Old quarter of the German capital of Berlin

Coordinates: 52°31′00″N 13°24′26″E

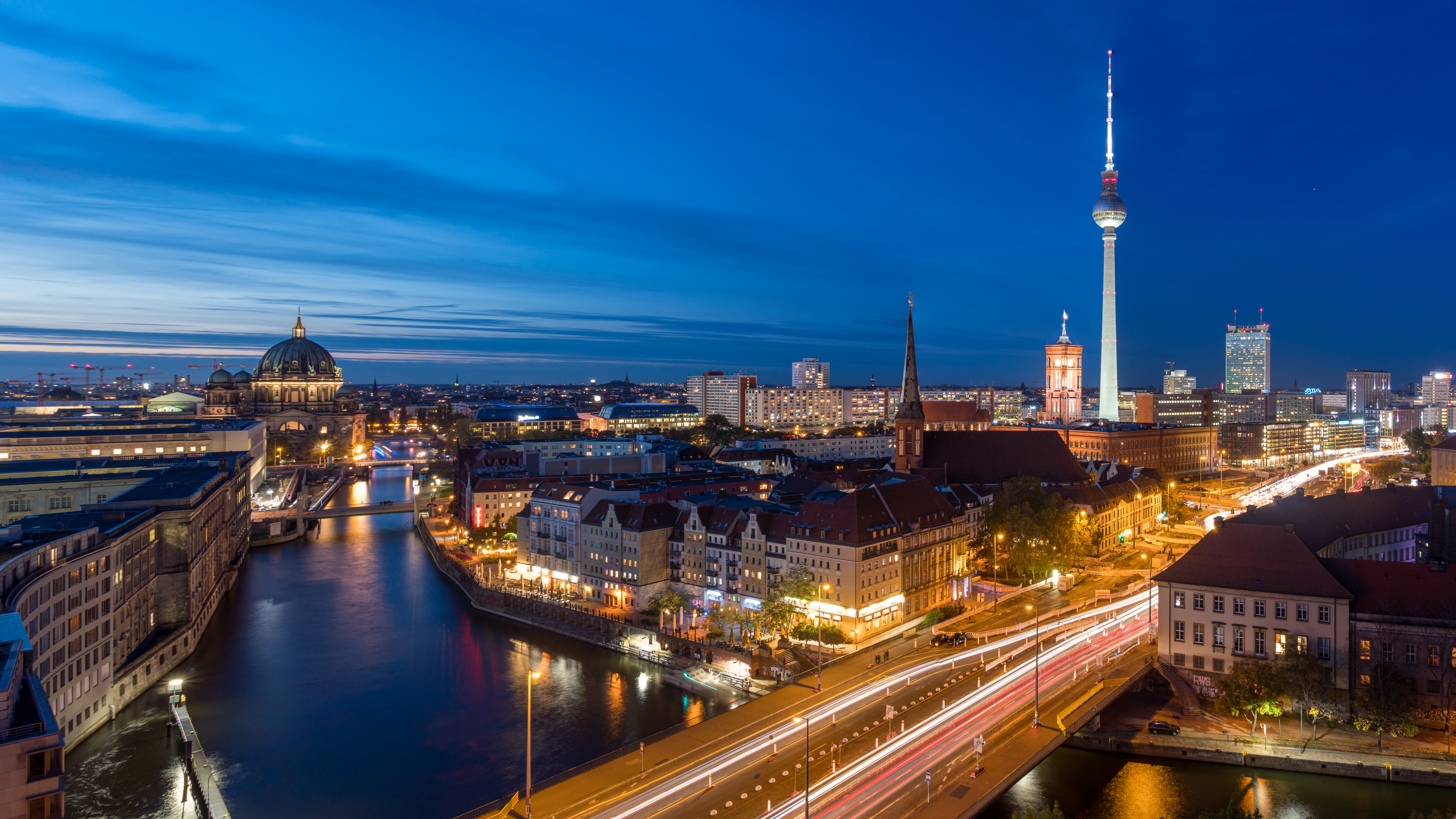
Nikolaiviertel and St. Nicholas Church in the center of the image

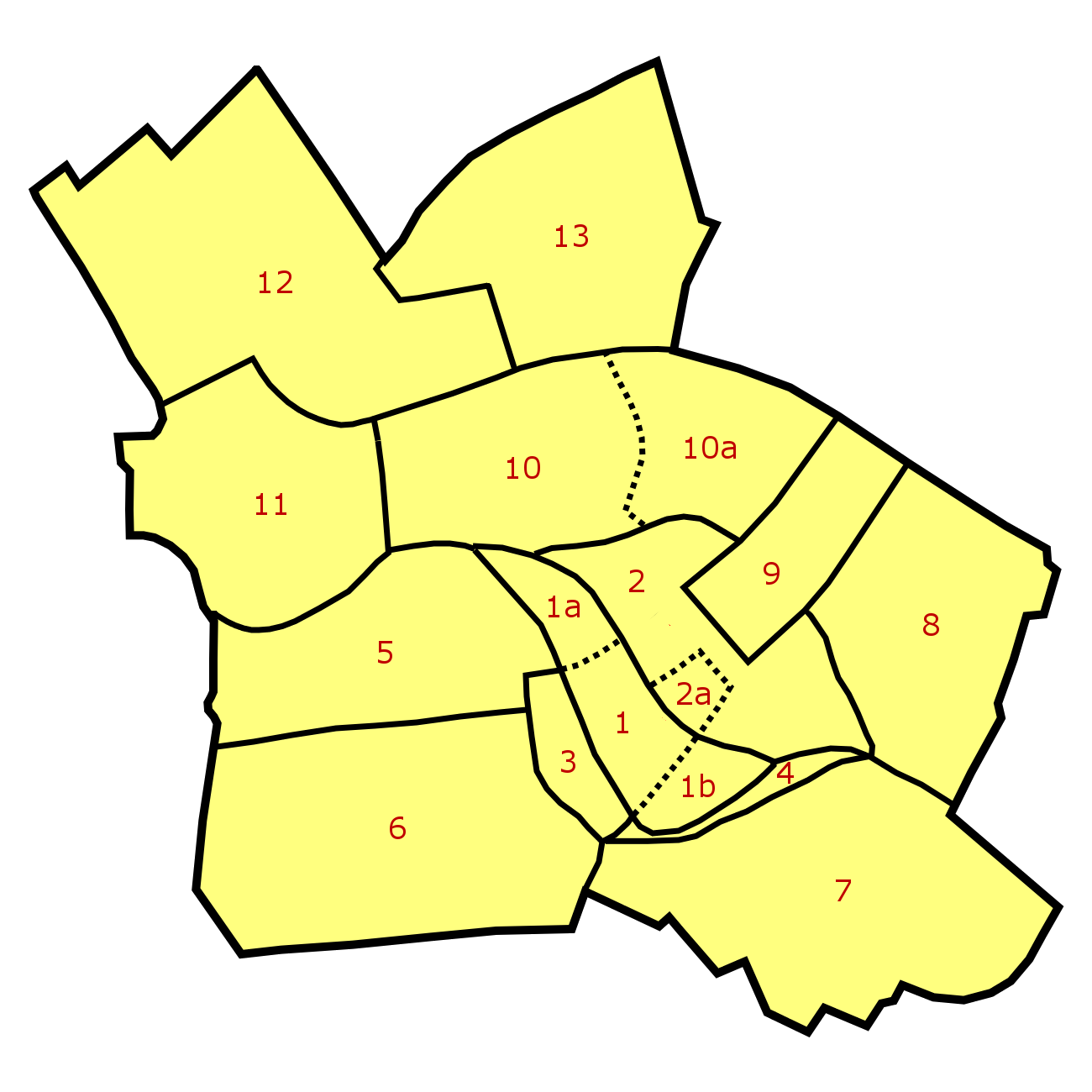
Quarters of Berlin-Mitte: Cölln (1); Museum Island (1a); Fisher Island (1b); Alt-Berlin (2); Nikolaiviertel (2a); Friedrichswerder (3); Neukölln am Wasser (4); Dorotheenstadt (5); Friedrichstadt (6); Luisenstadt (7); Stralauer Vorstadt (8); Alexanderplatz (9); Spandauer Vorstadt (10); Scheunenviertel (10a); Friedrich-Wilhelm-Stadt (11); Oranienburger Vorstadt (12); Rosenthaler Vorstadt (13)

The Nikolaiviertel ('Nicholas Quarter') is an old quarter of the German capital of Berlin, founded c. 1200. Together with nearby Cölln, they jointly make up Alt-Berlin, the reconstructed historical heart of the city. Located in the Mitte locality (in the homonymous district), it is five minutes away from Alexanderplatz and Berlin Palace.

== Geography ==
Situated on the eastern shore of the river Spree, it is bounded by the streets Rathausstraße, Spandauer Straße and Mühlendamm. The neighborhood itself is named for the eponymous deconsecrated Nikolaikirche ('St. Nicholas Church') at its heart. This is Berlin's oldest church and was dedicated to Saint Nicholas.

== History ==
The two settlements of Old Berlin as well as Cölln on the other side of the Spree originated along an old trade route, the Mühlendamm ('Mills Dam'), a ford where the river could be easily crossed. The Nikolaikirche, originally a late Romanesque basilica, was erected about 1230. The area around the church with its medieval alleys in the main had been preserved throughout the centuries, until it was destroyed by air raids and the Battle of Berlin during World War II.

At Berlin's 750th anniversary in 1987 the house-building was restored in a peculiar mixture of reconstructed historic houses and concrete slab Plattenbau blocks, giving the area an unmistakable appearance. Today the small area is famous for its traditional German restaurants and bars.

== Places of interest ==
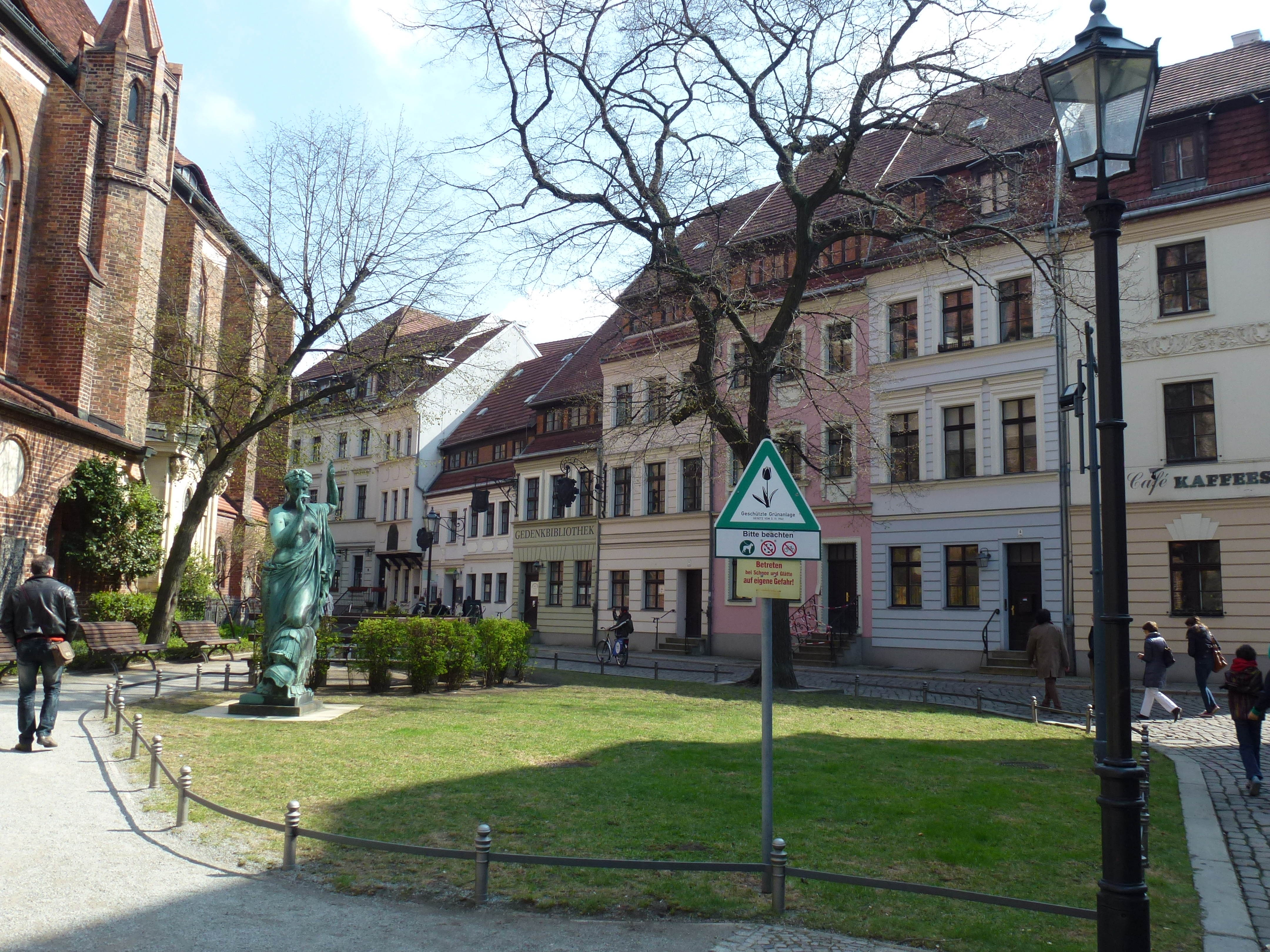
Nikolaikirchplatz, the heart of Nikolaiviertel

Beside Saint Nicholas' Church, the best-known building of the quarter is the Ephraim-Palais, built in 1766 for Veitel-Heine Ephraim, the financier of King Frederick II of Prussia. The Rococo façade at the intersection of Mühlendamm and Poststraße became famous as Berlin's "finest corner", until the house was demolished in 1936 for the laying out of the enlarged Mühlendamm street. Parts of the façade were stored in the western outskirts of Berlin, West Berlin authorities delivered them to East Berlin's magistrate in 1982 to support the reconstruction. The palace was rebuilt between 1983 and 1987, about 12 meters (39 ft) away from its original site. Today, it serves as a museum.

On the other side of the Poststraße is the Knoblauchhaus from 1760, with a neoclassical façade from the 19th century. One of the few preserved historic original buildings, it was the residence of the notable Knoblauch family with members like the architect Eduard Knoblauch or the physicist Karl-Hermann Knoblauch. It is home of a Biedermeier museum, the oldest civic museum of Berlin.

On the banks of the Spree stands the red sandstone Kurfürstenhaus ('House of the Prince-elector'), erected in 1897 at the site of an older building, where John Sigismund, Elector of Brandenburg died on December 23, 1619. As he believed a White Lady haunted the Stadtschloss ('City Palace'), he had fled to the home of his valet before dying there.

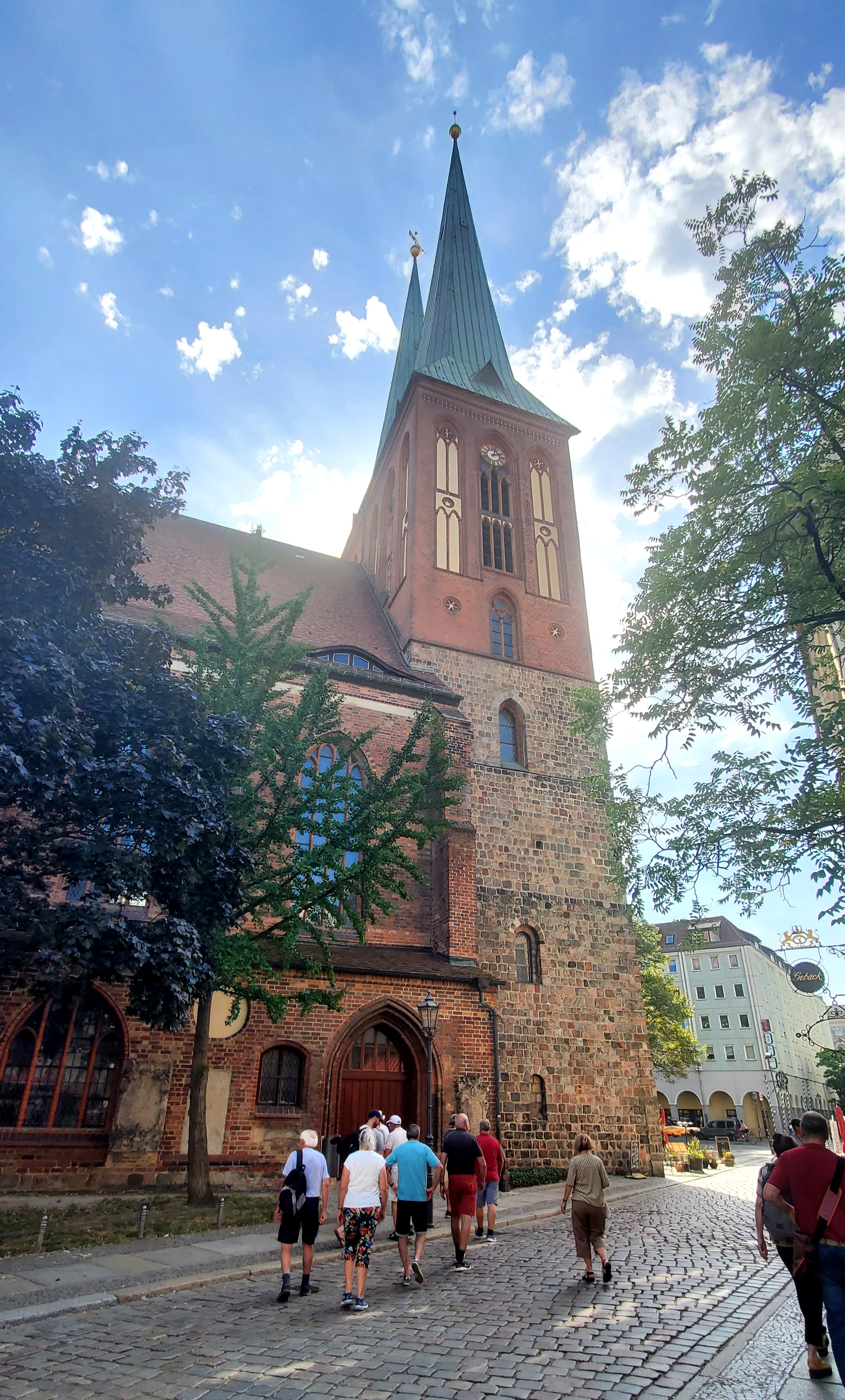
St. Nicholas Church, Berlin

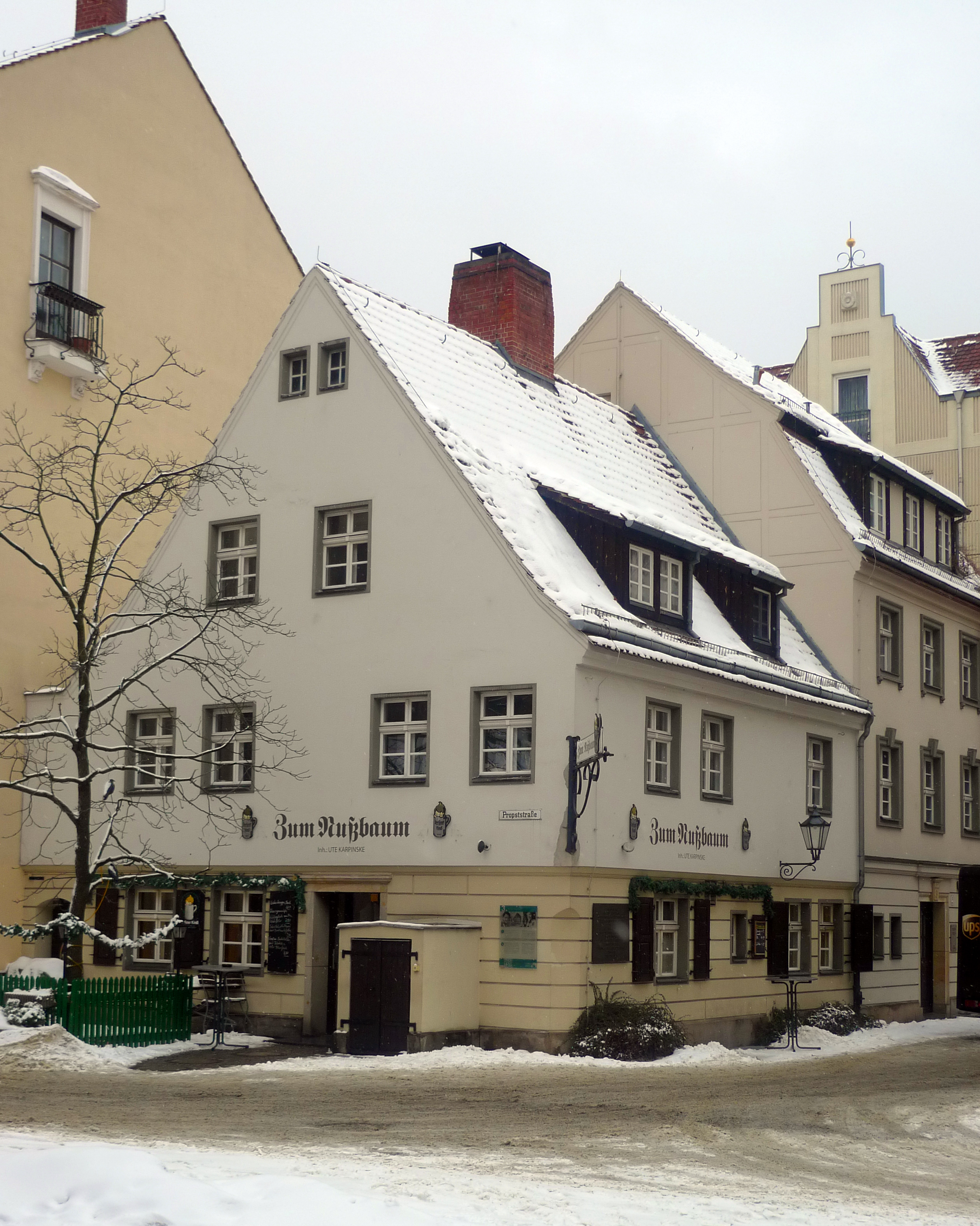
Zum Nußbaum, a historic inn

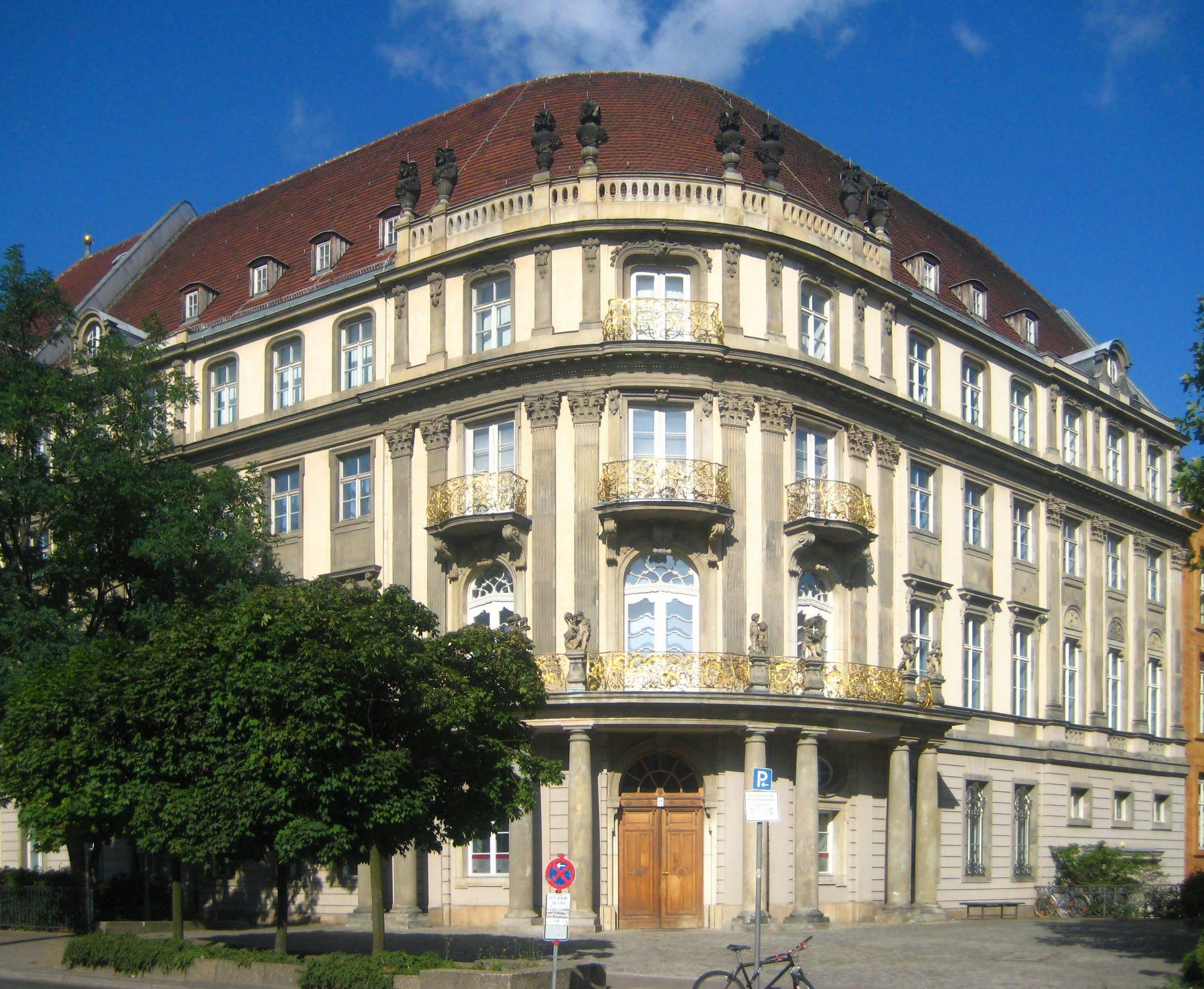
Ephraim-Palais

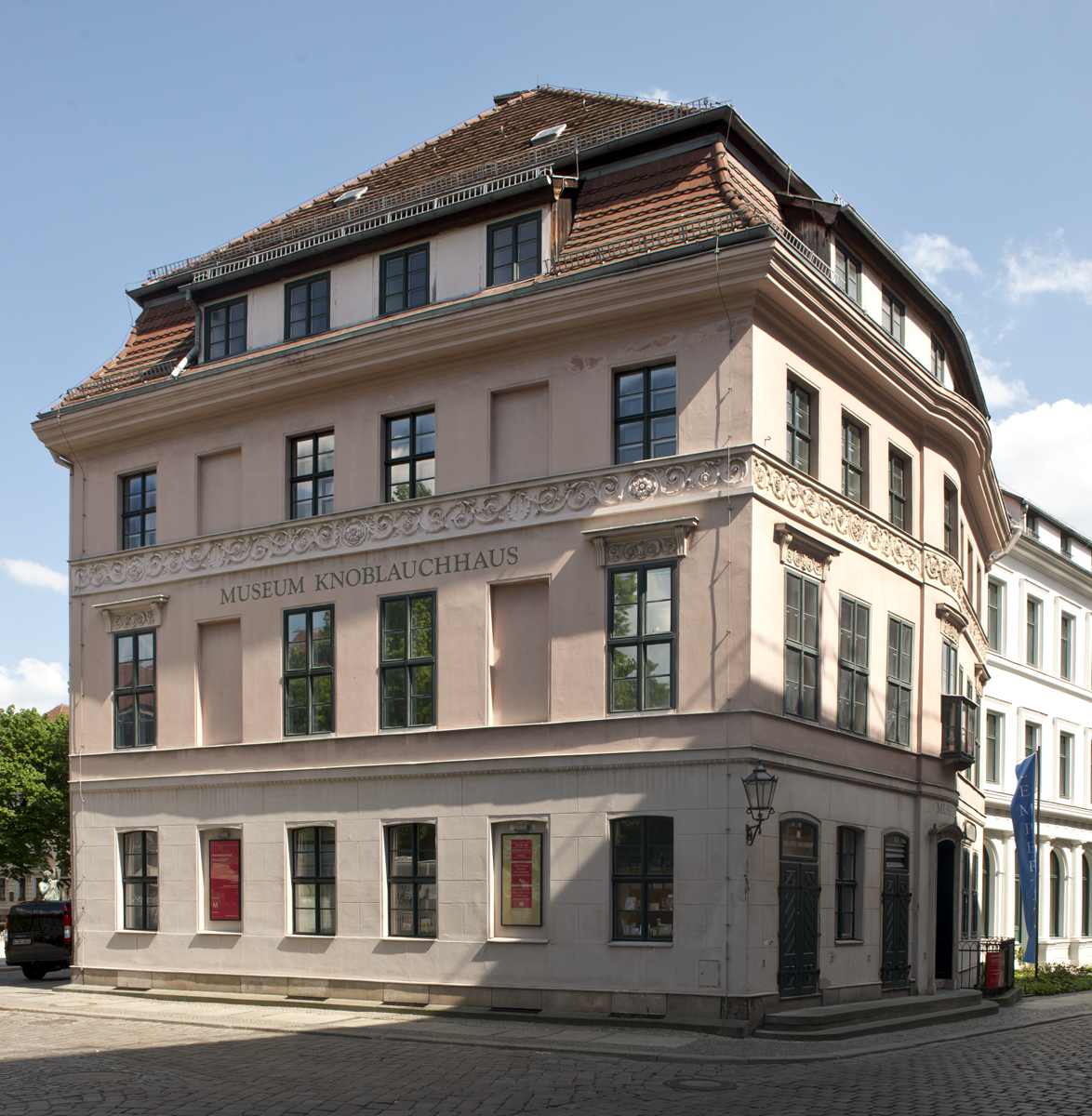
Knoblauchhaus

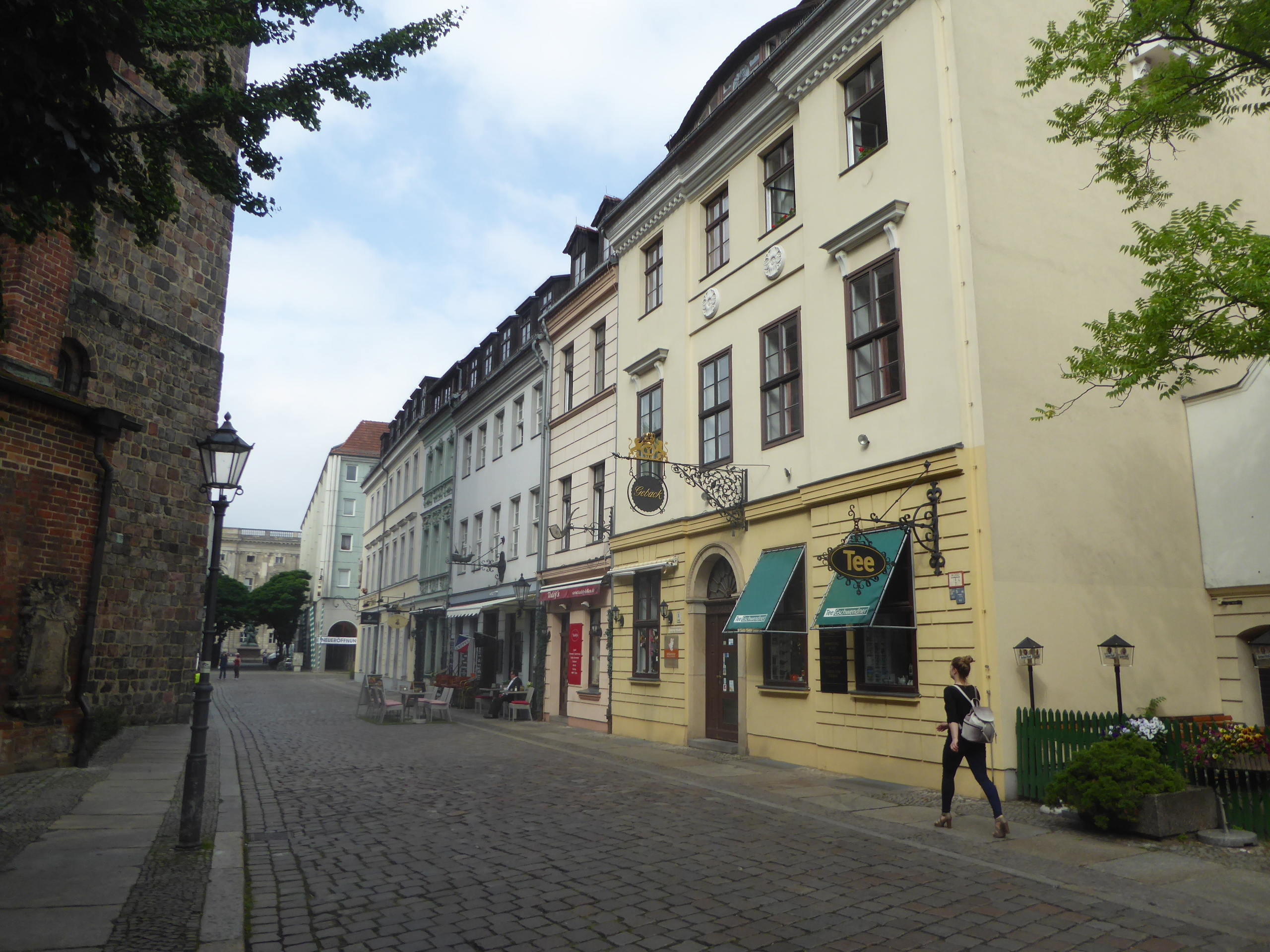
Propststraße

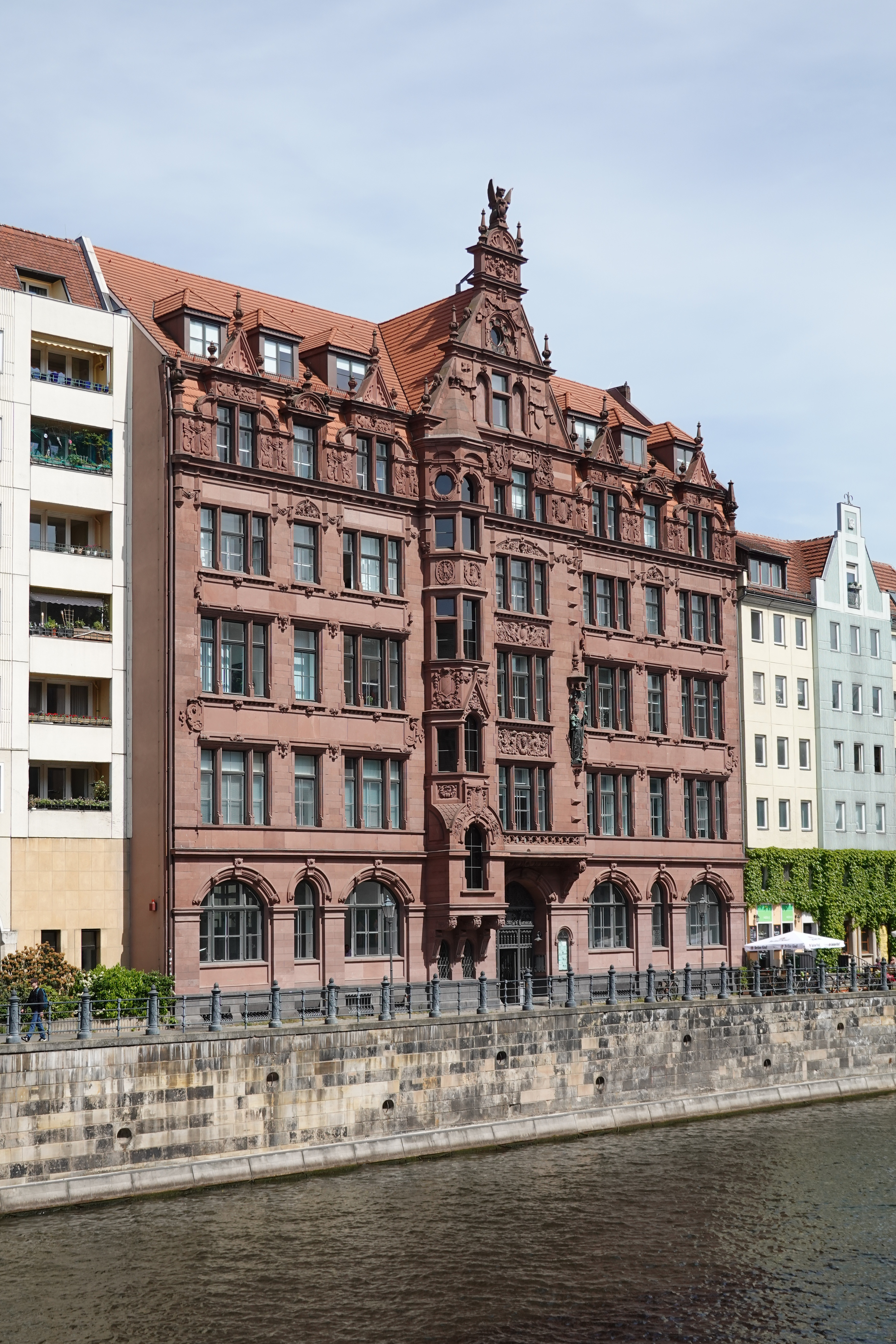
Kurfürstenhaus

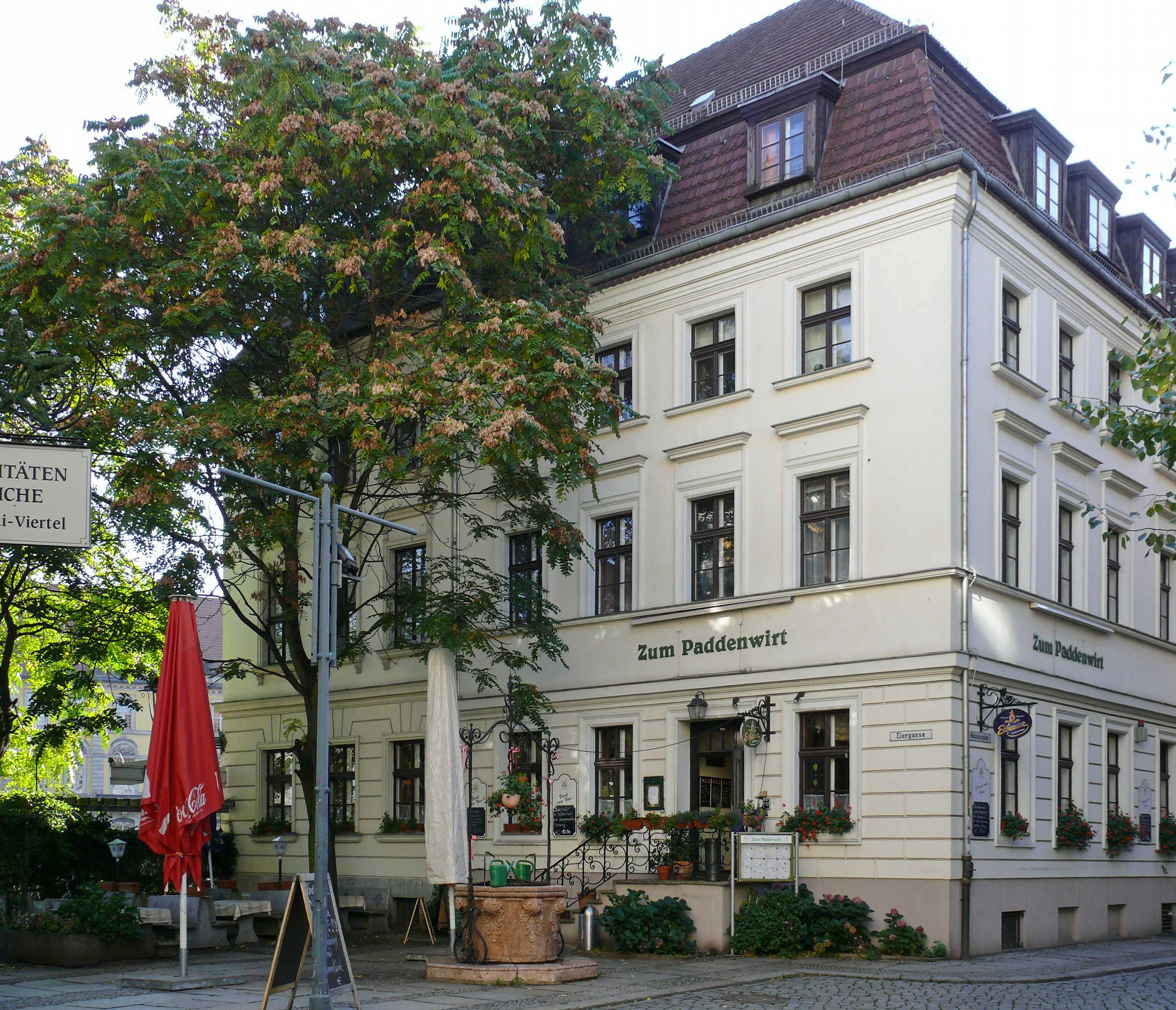
Eiergasse

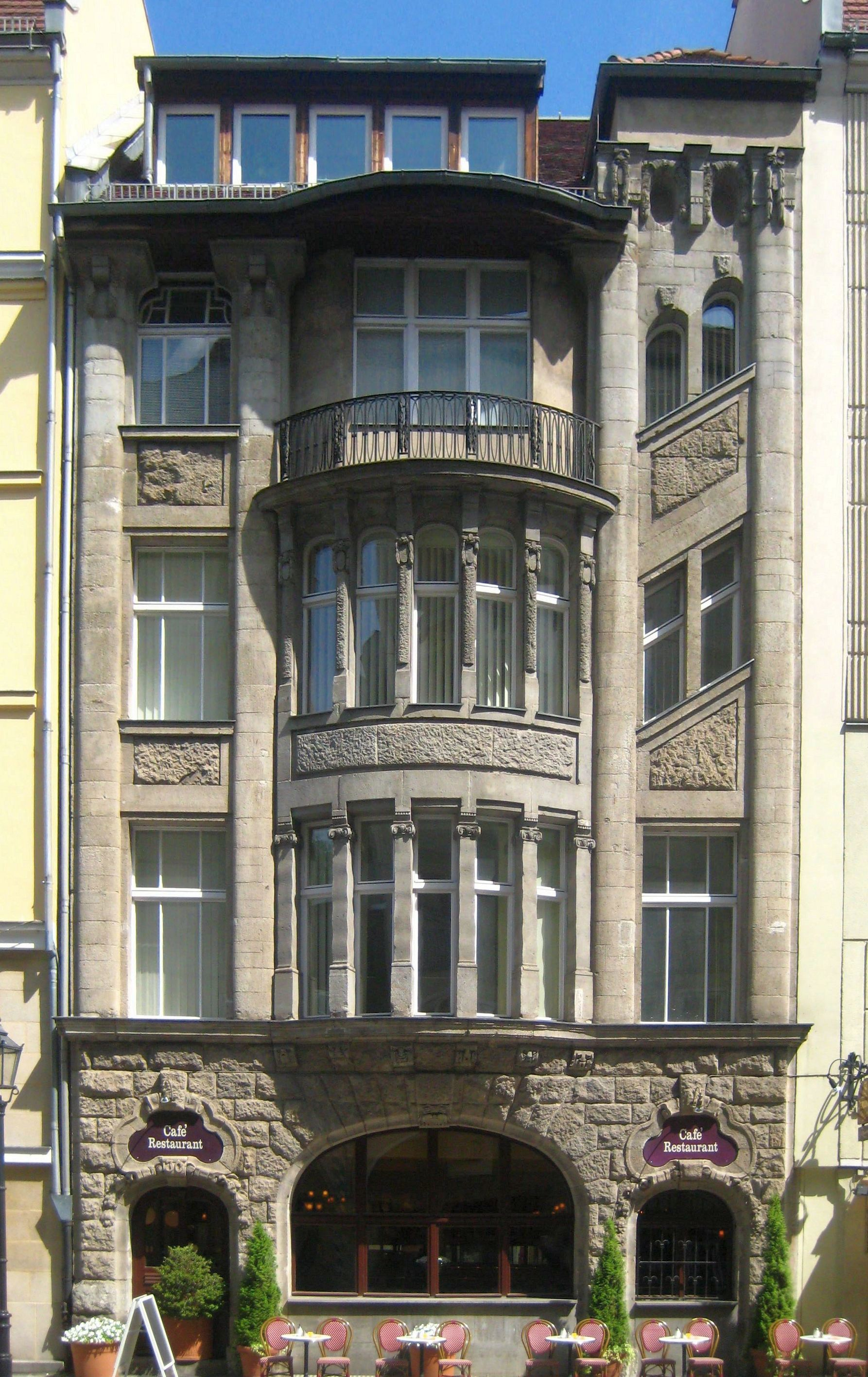
Schmales Haus

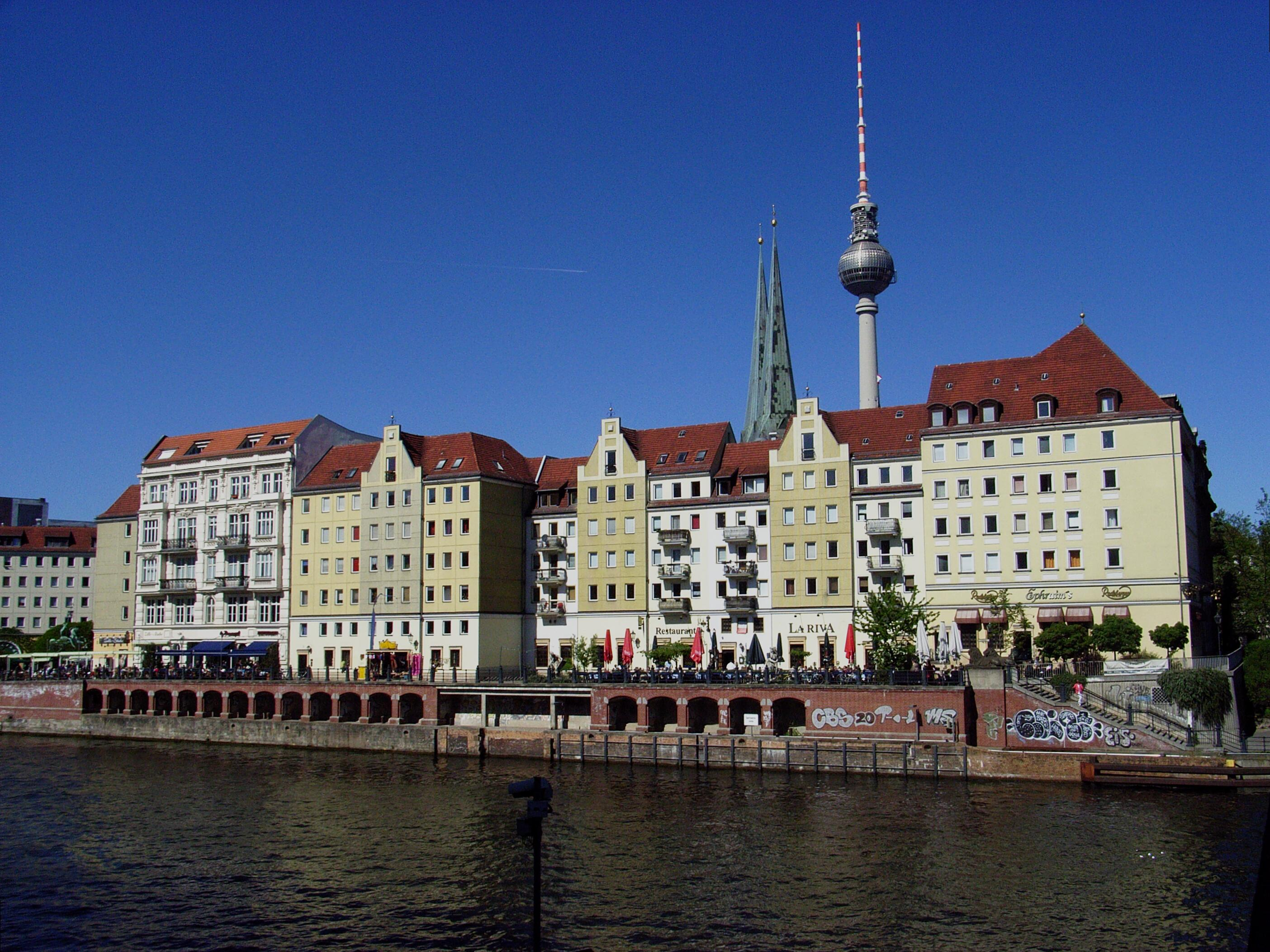
Nikolaiviertel with Spree

== See also ==
- History of Berlin
