= Knobloch =

Knobloch or Knoblock is a surname. Notable people with the surname include:

- Charlotte Knobloch (born 1932), Vice President of the European Jewish Congress
- Clay Knobloch (1839–1903), American politician
- Eberhard Knobloch (born 1943), German historian
- Edgar Knobloch (1927–2013), Czech historian
- Edward Knoblock (1874–1945), American dramatist
- Ferdinand Knobloch (1916–2018), Czech psychiatrist
- J. Fred Knobloch (born 1953, aka Fred Knoblock), American singer-songwriter
- Hans-Wilhelm Knobloch (1927–2019), German mathematician
- Heinz Knobloch (1926–2003), German writer and journalist
- Miloš Knobloch (1901–????), Czech cyclist
- Richard A. Knobloch (1918–2001), American brigadier general
- Thoralf Knobloch (born 1962), German artist
- Valentin Knobloch (born 1980), German judoka
- W.H. Knobloch, namesake of the Knobloch syndrome

== See also ==
- Knobloch, de.wikipedia
- Knoblauch
- Jim Knobeloch, American actor
- Alexandre Knoploch (born 1986), Brazilian politician
