= Knoblauch =

Knoblauch is a surname of German origin, a metonymic occupational name for a gardener or trader with garlic. It is also the German word for garlic. It may refer to:

- Chuck Knoblauch (born 1968), American baseball player
- Charles E. Knoblauch (1922–1984), American politician
- Eduard Knoblauch (1801–1865), German architect
- Emil Friedrich Knoblauch (1864–1936), German botanist
- Johannes Knoblauch (1855–1915), German mathematician
- Karl-Hermann Knoblauch (1820–1895), German physicist
- Kris Knoblauch (born 1978), Canadian professional ice hockey coach
- Mary Bookstaver (1875–1950) (married name Knoblauch), American feminist

== See also ==
- Knobloch
