= Rudolf Rothe =

German mathematician (1873–1942)

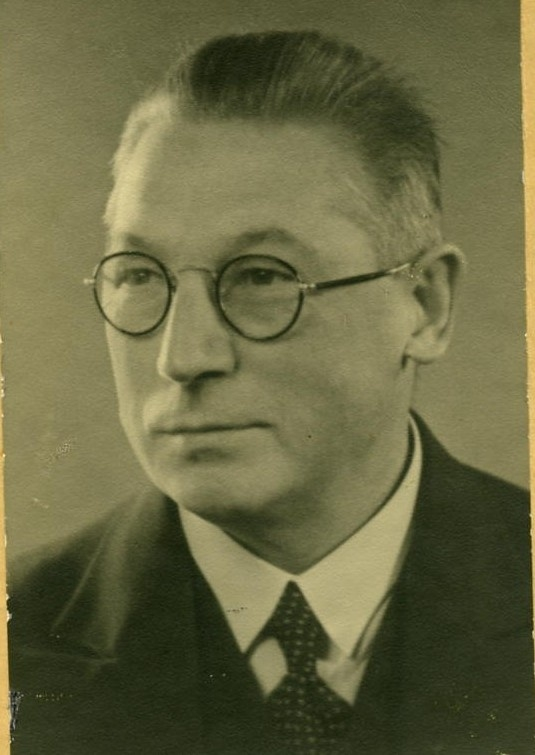
Rudolf Ernst Rothe

Rudolf Ernst Rothe (15 October 1873 in Berlin – 26 October 1942 in Berlin) was a German applied mathematician.

== Biography ==
After graduating from the Sophien-Gymnasium in Berlin, Rothe studied from 1892 under Hermann Amandus Schwarz, Johannes Knoblauch, Lazarus Immanuel Fuchs, and Ferdinand Georg Frobenius at the Humboldt University of Berlin. There in 1897 he received his Promotion (Ph.D.) with dissertation Untersuchungen über die Theorie der isothermal Flächen (Investigations on the theory of isothermal surfaces) supervised by Schwarz. In 1905 Rothe completed his habilitation at the Technische Hochschule Berlin-Charlottenburg (now Technische Universität Berlin). He was a professor from 1908 to 1914 at the Clausthal University of Technology (TU Claustral) and from 1914 to 1915 at the Technische Hochschule Hanover (University of Hanover), where he founded the Institute for Applied Mathematics. From 1915 he was a professor at Technische Hochschule Berlin, where he was rector in 1921. After retiring in 1939, he was an honorary senator of Technische Universität Berlin.

His research deals with differential geometry and function theory. During WW I, he did research on ballistics and on determining the trajectories for the projectiles fired from the "Paris gun" (which in 1918 was fired at Paris from 120 kilometers away).

In 1926 he was elected a member of the German National Academy of Sciences Leopoldina.

In 1930 he was president of the Deutsche Mathematiker-Vereinigung. From 1916 to 1918 and from 1939 to 1941 he was chair of the Berlin Mathematical Society, of which he was a founding member.

After the death of Johannes Knoblauch, Rothe completed the editing and publishing of the collected works of Karl Weierstrass. Rothe was co-editor with Felix Auerbach of the Taschenbuch für Mathematiker und Physiker (Pocket-sized book for mathematicians and physicists), published by B. G. Teubner Verlag in 1911 and 1913 (and first published in 1909 by Auerbach alone).

== Selected publications ==
- Untersuchungen über die Theorie der isothermen Flächen, Dissertation, Mayer und Müller, Berlin 1897
- Untersuchungen über die geodätische Abbildung zweier Flächen konstanten Krümmungsmaßes aufeinander (Investigations into the geodetic mapping of two surfaces of constant curvature onto each other), Journal für die reine und angewandte Mathematik, vol. 132, 1907, p. 36
- Anwendungen der Vektoranalysis auf die Differentialgeometrie (Applications of vector analysis to differential geometry), Jahresbericht DMV, vol. 21, 1912, p. 249
- Darstellende Geometrie des Geländes (Descriptive geometry of terrain), Mathematisch-Physikalische Bibliothek, Teubner 1914
- Elementarmathematik und Technik, Teubner 1924
- Höhere Mathematik für Mathematiker, Physiker und Ingenieure (Higher mathematics for mathematicians, physicists and engineers), parts 1–6, Teubner, 1st published in 1925 (new edition in the 1960s, updated by István Szabó)
- Funktionentheorie und ihre Anwendung in der Technik (Function theory and its application in technology), Springer 1931 (English translation, MIT Press 1933, Dover 1961)
- Differentialgeometrie, De Gruyter 1937
- mathematical section of the engineering, pocket-sized book Hütte for several years in the 1930s
- "Verzeichnis de mathematischen Aufsätze von Rudolf Ernst Rothe (publication list of Rudolf Ernst Rothe)" (PDF). wikimedia.org.
