= Großgaststätte Ahornblatt =

Former building in Berlin

Coordinates: 52°30′47.35″N 13°24′20.79″E

The Großgaststätte Ahornblatt (German: [ˈɡʁoːsˌɡastʃtɛtə ˈaːhɔʁnˌblat], Great Maple Leaf Restaurant) was a building located in the Mitte district of Berlin. Built between 1971 and 1973 as part of the new Fischerinsel residential condominium project, it accommodated a self service restaurant with 880 seats and a shopping arcade for the employees of the East German Ministry of Construction and for the workers of other nearby offices. Despite protests, the building was demolished in 2000.

== Background and construction ==
The Ahornblatt was built between 1970 and 1973 along with the tall towers of the new Fischerinsel residential condominium project, and was intended to serve as its social center. The building was located on the corner of Gertraudenstraße and Fischerinsel.

The Ahornblatt design came from the architects Gerhard Lehmann and Rüdiger Plaeth, following the urban concepts of Helmut Stingl. The Ahornblatt name resulted from the leaf-like, outwardly curved shape of the roof. The construction of the concrete shell was made by Ulrich Müther (1937–2007), one of the world's leading authorities in this area, using the VEB special concrete from Binz. The outer walls were glazed and divided by arranged horizontal louvres.

Its construction lasted from 1970 to 1973, with its main function being a restaurant for employees of the East German Bauministerium, the Ministry of Construction. After 1976, it was also used as a bar for the construction workers of the Palast der Republik. After working hours, various recreational events (disco dances, brigade evenings, etc.) took place there.

== After reunification ==
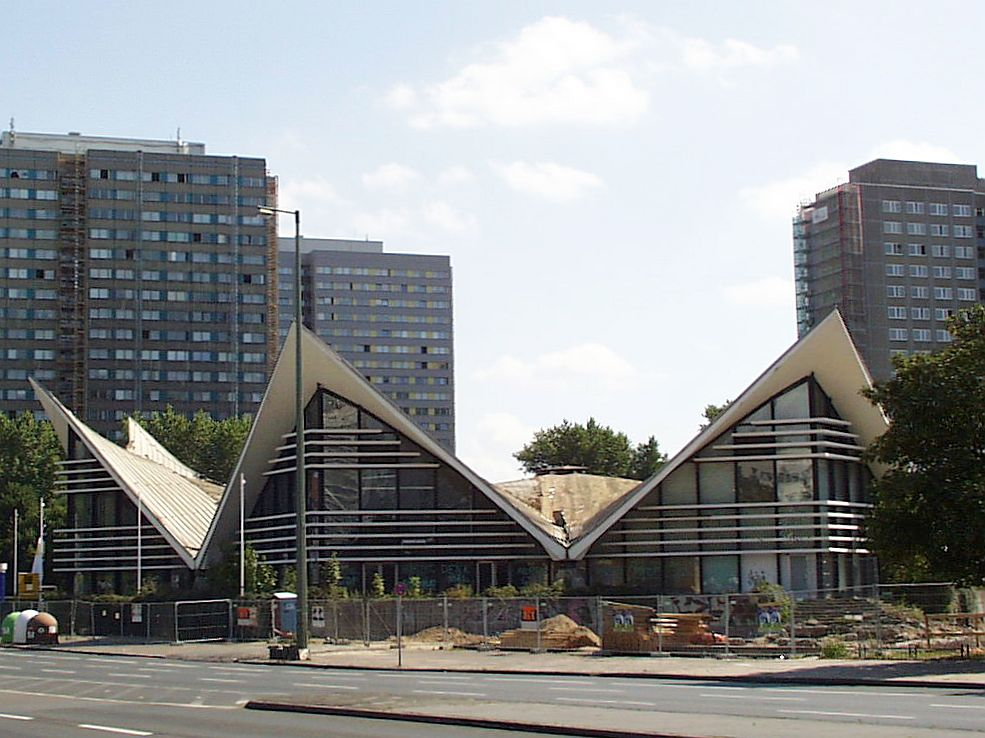
The Ahornblatt ready for imminent demolition, 2000.

After German reunification, the building was used as a nightclub, under the name Exit. DJ Tanith held his first regular after-hour events there. Later, the Ahornblatt fell into disuse. In 1997, the local Oberfinanzdirektion (revenue office) sold the site to the private firm Objekt Marketing GmbH.

The demolition of the Ahornblatt was seen as part of an ongoing destruction of modern architecture from East Germany; Müther's Hyparschale in Magdeburg, while still standing, is unoccupied and under threat of ruin. Despite numerous protests against the demolition of the Ahornblatt, the new owner obtained a demolition permit for the Ahornblatt, with the consent of the Denkmalschutzbehörde (preservation authority), even in the absence of general agreement. On 21 January 2000, Müther held the last guided tour in his building. Demolition began on 19 July 2000. The Accor Group built a hotel for business travelers and families on the site.

== Bibliography and media ==
- Falser, Michael. "Zweierlei Erbe auf ein und derselben Insel: Das 'UNESCO-Weltkulturerbe' der nördlichen Museumsinsel und der Abriss des "Ahornblatt" auf der südlichen Fischerinsel (1999/2000)" and "Steinbruch, Mythenraum, Geschichtswerkstatt – die Berliner Spreeinsel und ihr Umfeld nach der deutschen Wiedervereinigung", in Zwischen Identität und Authentizität. Zur politischen Geschichte der Denkmalpflege in Deutschland. Dresden: Thelem, 2008. pp. 243–250. ISBN 978-3-939888-41-3. (in German)
- Fuchs, Margarete. Für den Schwung sind Sie zuständig. Documentary, 58 min. Produced: 2002, Released: 2006. Also includes archival footage about the construction of the Ahornblatt. (in German)
