= Toralf =

Toralf is a Norwegian given name that may refer to:

- Toralf Arndt (born 1966), German association football player
- Toralf Engan (born 1936), Norwegian ski jumper
- Toralf Konetzke (born 1972), German association football player
- Toralf Lyng (1909–2005), Norwegian sports official
- Toralf Sandø (1899–1970), Norwegian film director and actor
- John Toralf Steffensen (1919–1996), Norwegian politician
- Toralf Tollefsen (1914–1994), Norwegian concert accordionist
- Toralf Westermoen (1914–1986), Norwegian developer of high-speed craft
