= Fischerinsel =

Part of island

Coordinates: 52°30′47″N 13°24′24″E

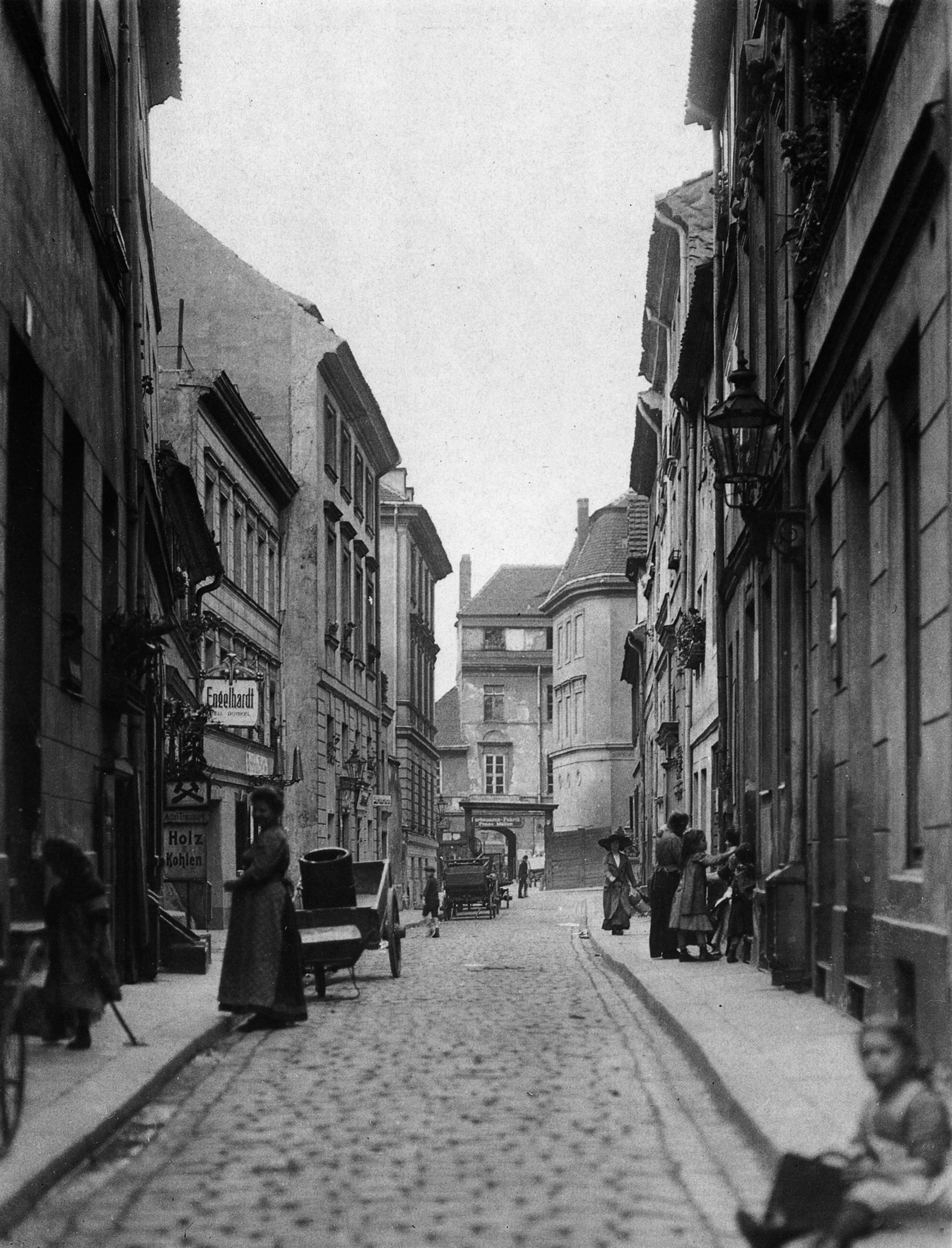
Köllnische Straße on the Fischerinsel, ca. 1900

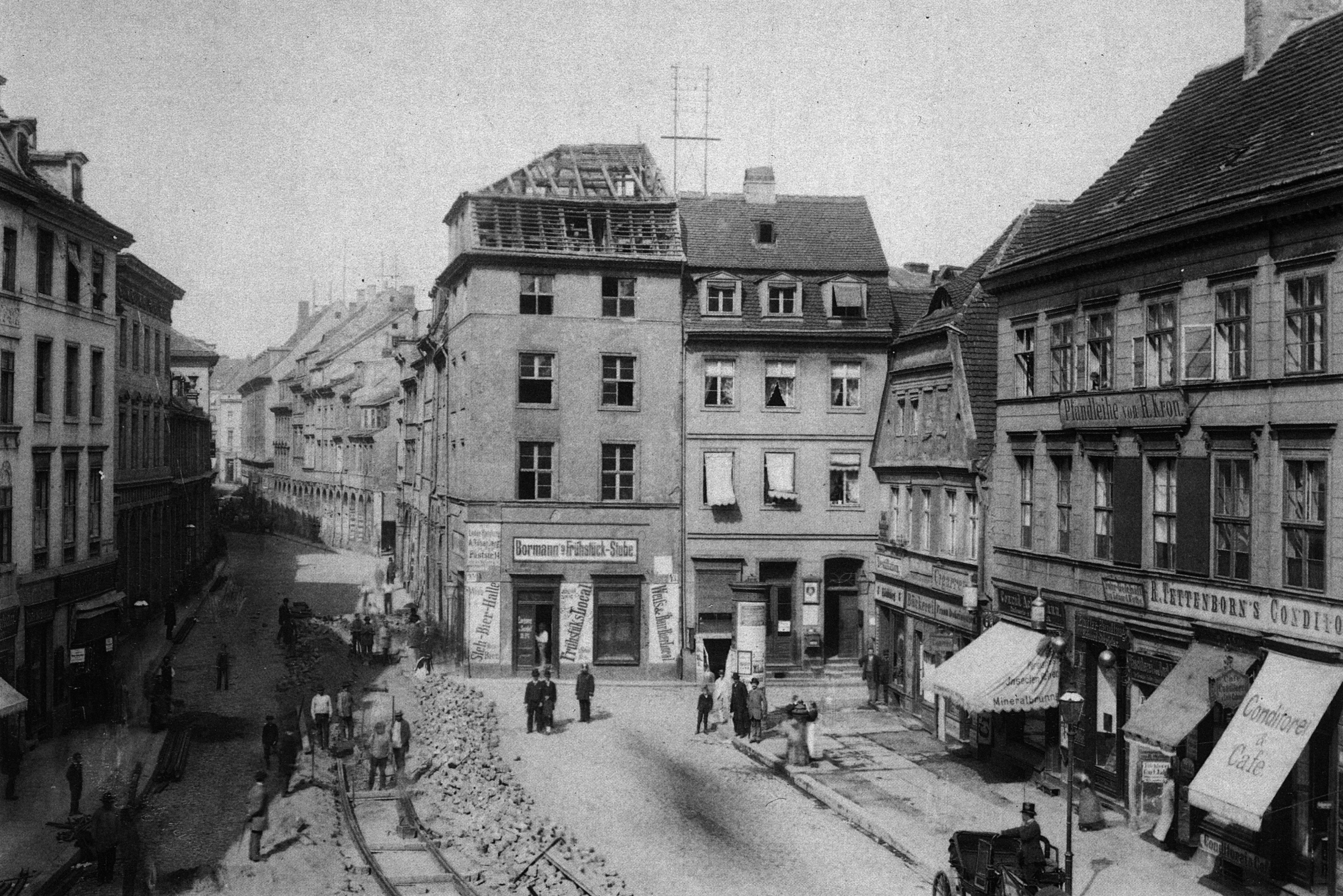
Köllnischer Fischmarkt, 1886; Breite Straße now meets Gertraudenstraße at this point

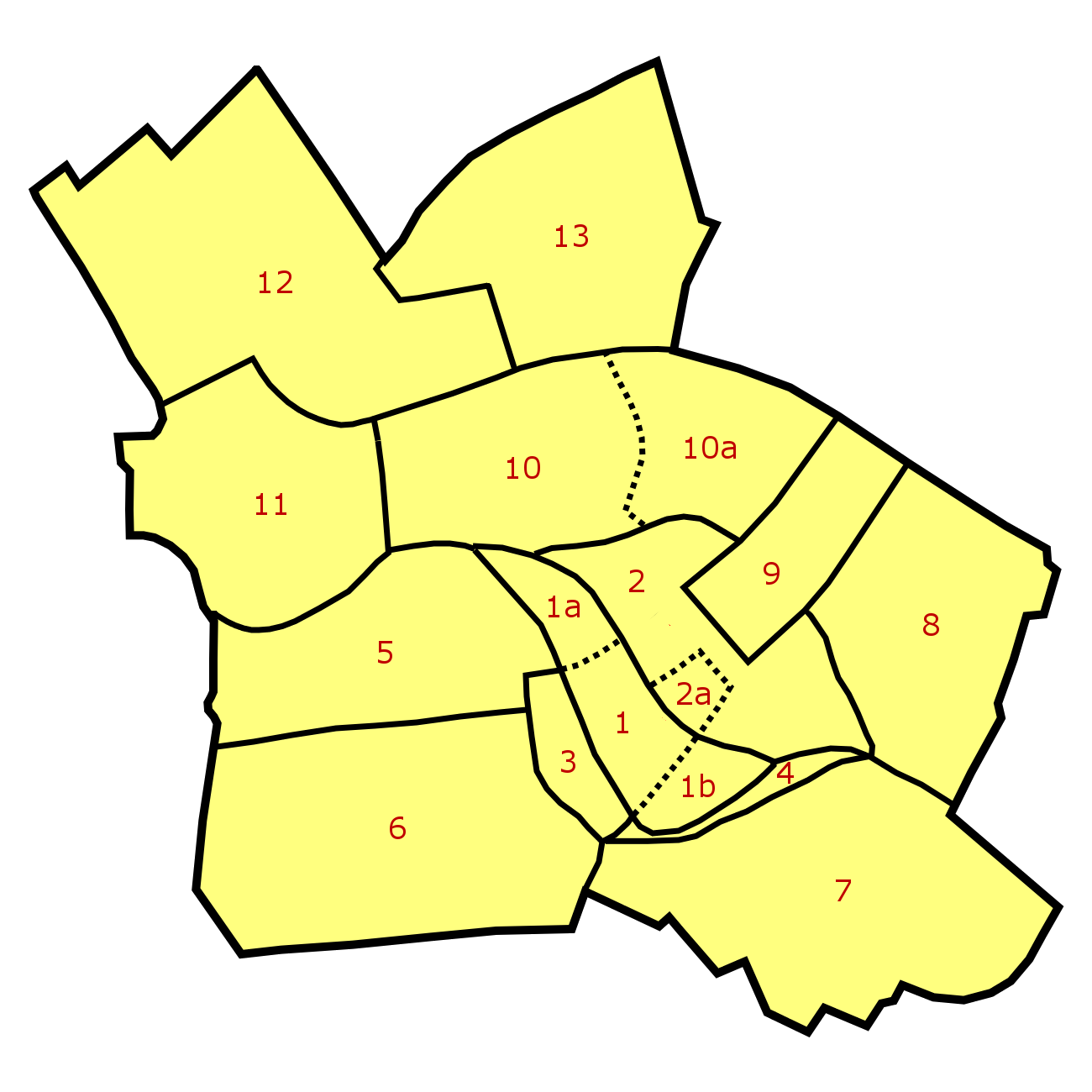
Quarters of Berlin-Mitte: Cölln (1); Museum Island (1a); Fisher Island (1b); Alt-Berlin (2); Nikolaiviertel (2a); Friedrichswerder (3); Neukölln am Wasser (4); Dorotheenstadt (5); Friedrichstadt (6); Luisenstadt (7); Stralauer Vorstadt (8); Alexanderplatz (9); Spandauer Vorstadt (10); Scheunenviertel (10a); Friedrich-Wilhelm-Stadt (11); Oranienburger Vorstadt (12); Rosenthaler Vorstadt (13)

Fischerinsel (German pronunciation: [ˈfɪʃɐˌʔɪnzl̩], Fisher Island) is the southern part of the island in the River Spree which was formerly the location of the city of Cölln and is now part of central Berlin. The northern part of the island is known as Museum Island. Fischerinsel is normally said to extend south from Gertraudenstraße and is named for a fishermen's settlement which formerly occupied the southern end of the island. Until the mid-twentieth century it was a well preserved pre-industrial neighbourhood, and most of the buildings survived World War II, but in the 1960s and 1970s under the German Democratic Republic it was levelled and replaced with a development of residential tower blocks.

== History ==
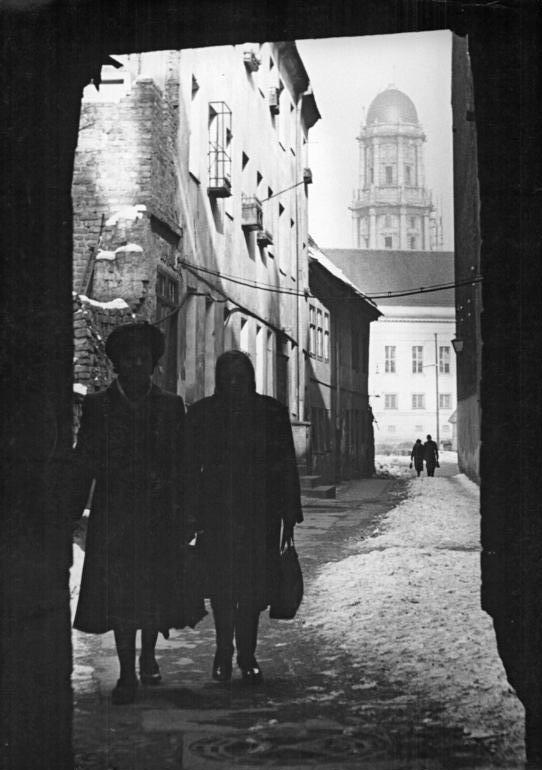
Off Fischerstraße, 1952, Altes Stadthaus tower in the background

The original settlement of fishermen and other boatmen and their families was part of Cölln from 1237 on. The neighbourhood, which occupies approximately 8 hectares (20 acres; 0.031 sq mi) had many relatively well to do inhabitants, but during the 17th century it became a crowded neighbourhood of poor people and came to be known as the Fischerkiez (fishing village). In 1709, Cölln united with Berlin, whose old centre lay on the east bank of the river. In the 18th century, boating professions became less important as the city industrialised. As a result, in the early 19th century, the Fischerinsel district stopped developing and became a neighbourhood which preserved the look of old Berlin, including the last gabled houses in the city. In the 20th century it became a tourist attraction.

The neighbourhood and its high street, Fischerstraße, remained comparatively untouched after World War II. (Note: The Luisenstädtische Bildungsverein encyclopedia entry and the city tourist information page on the Fischerinsel state that there was considerable destruction in the Fischerinsel: "stark zerstört", "weitgehend zerstört".) Like the rest of the borough of Mitte, it fell into the Soviet Zone which became East Berlin. In 1954, a plan was drawn up for the neighbourhood which emphasised conservation of the surviving buildings. Later plans envisaged replacement with low density housing (1957) and a perimeter development of tower blocks. However, in 1960 an overall plan was adopted for central Berlin which required demolition of all the buildings in the Fischerinsel area. This was done beginning in 1964, including 30 registered landmarks, and the ancient street plan was effaced. The painter Otto Nagel, in the last years of his life, documented it in a series of pastels entitled Abschied vom Fischerkiez (Farewell to the Fishing Village), after calling in vain for its preservation in 1955.

Breite Straße was extended and beginning in 1967, five residential tower blocks were built; they were announced as the "first group of high-rise buildings in the capital", but later conflicted with plans for a grand central urban axis. In 1971–73, the dramatic Großgaststätte Ahornblatt (Great Maple Leaf Restaurant) was added to serve the neighbourhood, which ultimately also included the five 21-storey blocks, a double block with 18- and 21-storey sections, (Note: According to the city tourist information page, there are two double tower blocks.) a swimming centre opened in October 1979, two kindergartens, and a supermarket. In 2000 the Ahornblatt was demolished, to be replaced by a multi-use centre including a hotel, flats and offices, despite protests that it should be preserved. As a result of the redevelopment of the site, the old locations of Roßstraße, Petristraße, Grünstraße and Gertraudenstraße can be seen in places.

Fischerinsel is today the seat of Historic port of Berlin (Historischer Hafen Berlin), a non profit association focused on renovating old ships and giving them new life. One of them, MS Heimatland, built in 1910, is a seat of Hošek Contemporary, art residency and gallery. The gallery focuses primarily on site specific installations, performing arts and experimental sound installations.

== Notable buildings ==
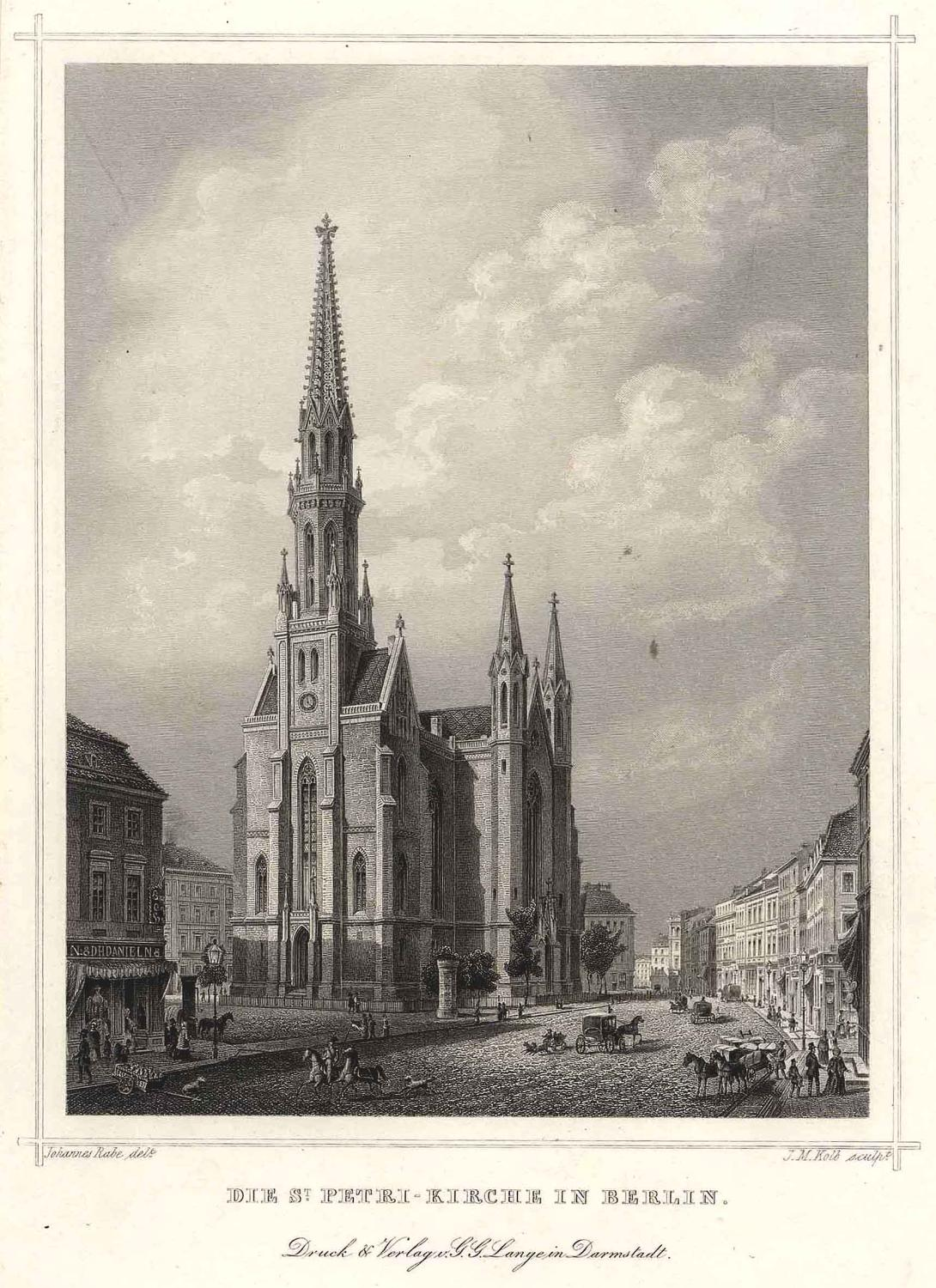
Petrikirche in the 19th century

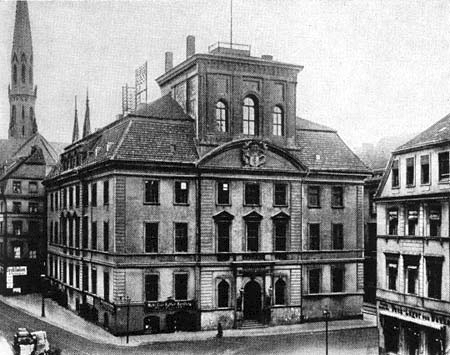
Cölln Town Hall, about 1880; Petrikirche in the background

The Petrikirche (St. Peter's Church) on Petriplatz, abutting Gertraudenstraße on the north side, was the parish church of Cölln and is presumed to have been founded in the first half of the 13th century, around the time the cities of Berlin and Cölln were both granted their charters. The last of five churches on the site, the second neo-Gothic church in the city, was designed by Heinrich Strack and built in 1846–53. It had a spire 111 metres (364 ft) high which was for some time the tallest building in Berlin. The building was wrecked by artillery fire and burnt during the battle for Berlin in 1945 because a Waffen-SS unit was holed up inside, and was demolished in 1964 as part of the clearance of the Fischerinsel. In its place will be built the House Of One - the world's first house of prayer for three religions.

The last Cölln Town Hall (Rathaus) faced the Köllnischer Fischmarkt. It was designed by the court architect, Martin Grünberg, and built in 1710–23 in baroque style, but as a cost-cutting measure, the tower and entrance stairs were not built. It was demolished in 1899/90.

The inn Zum Nußbaum at Fischerstraße 21, built in 1705 according to an inscription over the cellar entrance and named for the nut tree which formerly stood outside it, was one of the oldest remaining drinking establishments in the city. It was popular with tourists and had been frequented and depicted by Heinrich Zille and Otto Nagel. Destroyed in 1943, it was recreated in 1987 in the Nikolaiviertel as part of the East German creation of a tourist old town there. (Note: The Ermelerhaus, a patrician townhouse in rococo style that stood at Breite Straße 11, within old Cölln but north of the Fischerinsel neighbourhood, was demolished in 1966/67 but likewise reconstructed, at Märkisches Ufer 12 in Neukölln am Wasser, on the other side of the Spree Canal from the Fischerinsel: Ermeler-Haus, Denkmale in Berlin, Senatsverwaltung für Stadtentwicklung und Umwelt, revised 13 July 2012 (in German). The city tourist information page, however, says that this was a house from Friedrichsgracht 15.)

The Großgaststätte Ahornblatt, designed by Gerhard Lehmann, Ulrich Müther, Rüdiger Plaethe and Helmut Stingel, was built in 1971–73. It was registered as a city landmark in 1995 for its modern East German architecture, but was nonetheless demolished in 2000.

== Notable residents ==
- Hans Kohlhase, on whom Heinrich von Kleist's novella Michael Kohlhaas is based; the house at Fischerstraße 28 was presumed to have been his.
- Markus Wolf, chief of foreign intelligence for the Stasi, lived in one of the tower blocks in the 1970s.

== Gallery ==
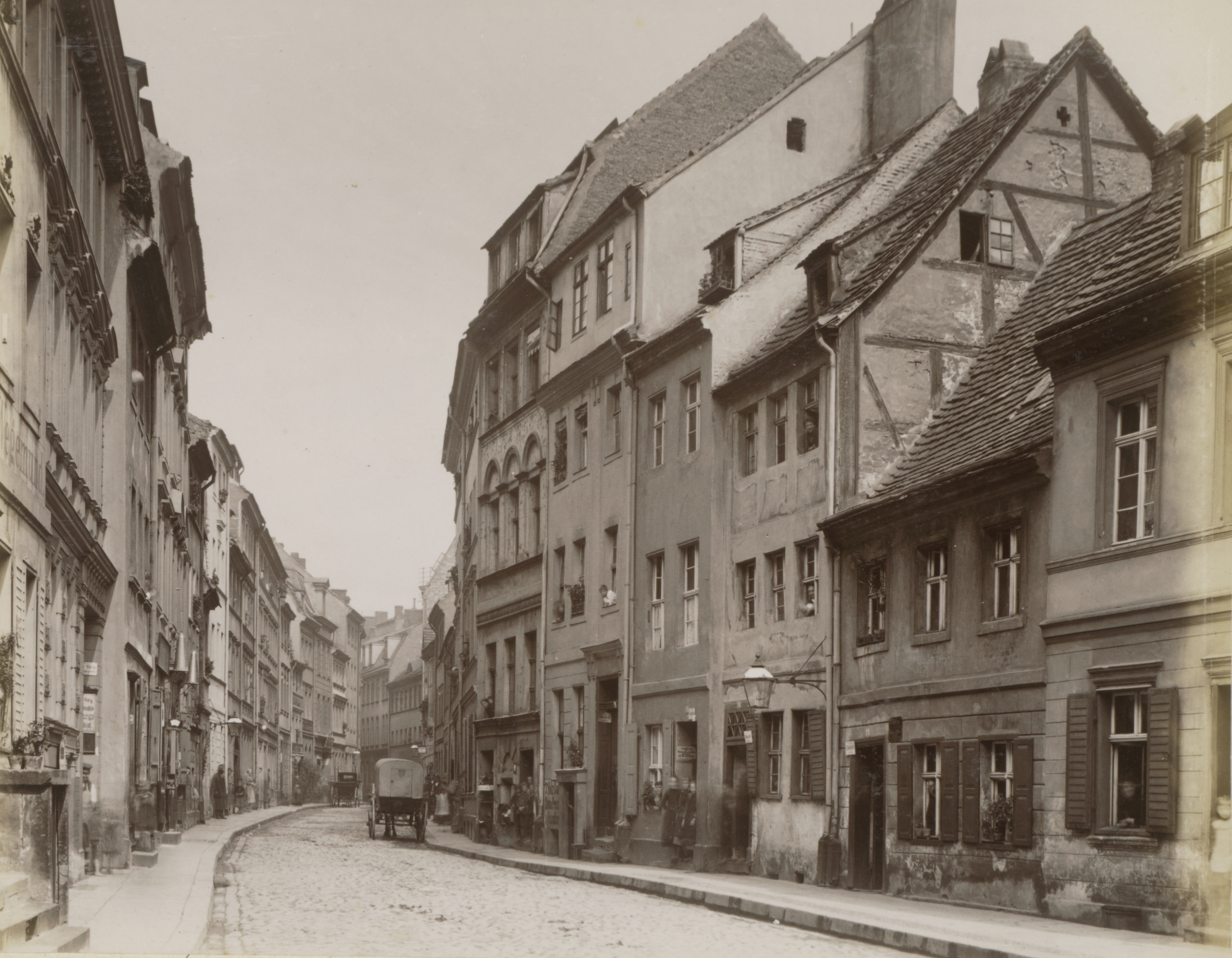
View south on Petristraße, around 1880

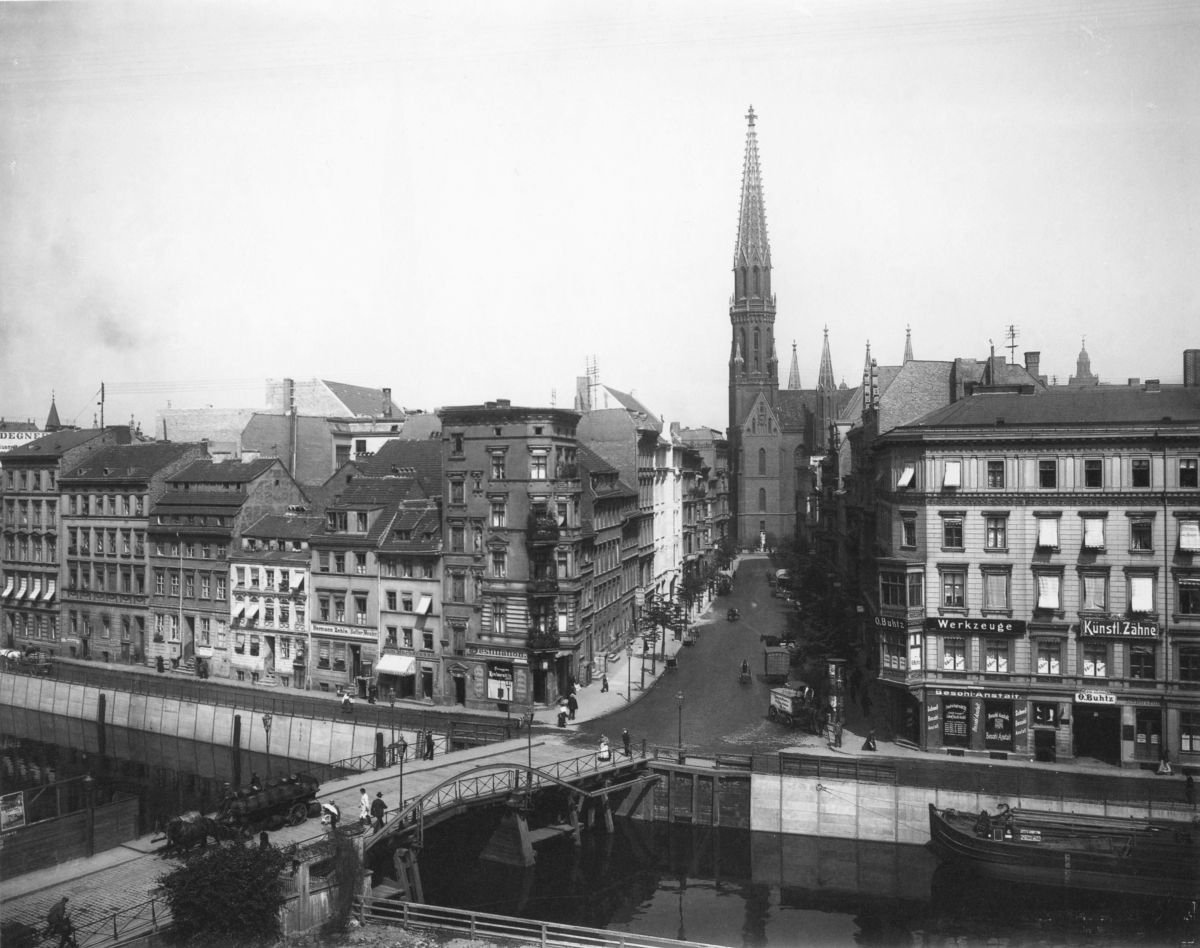
View down Grünstraße with the old Grünstraßenbrücke to the Petrikirche, 1903

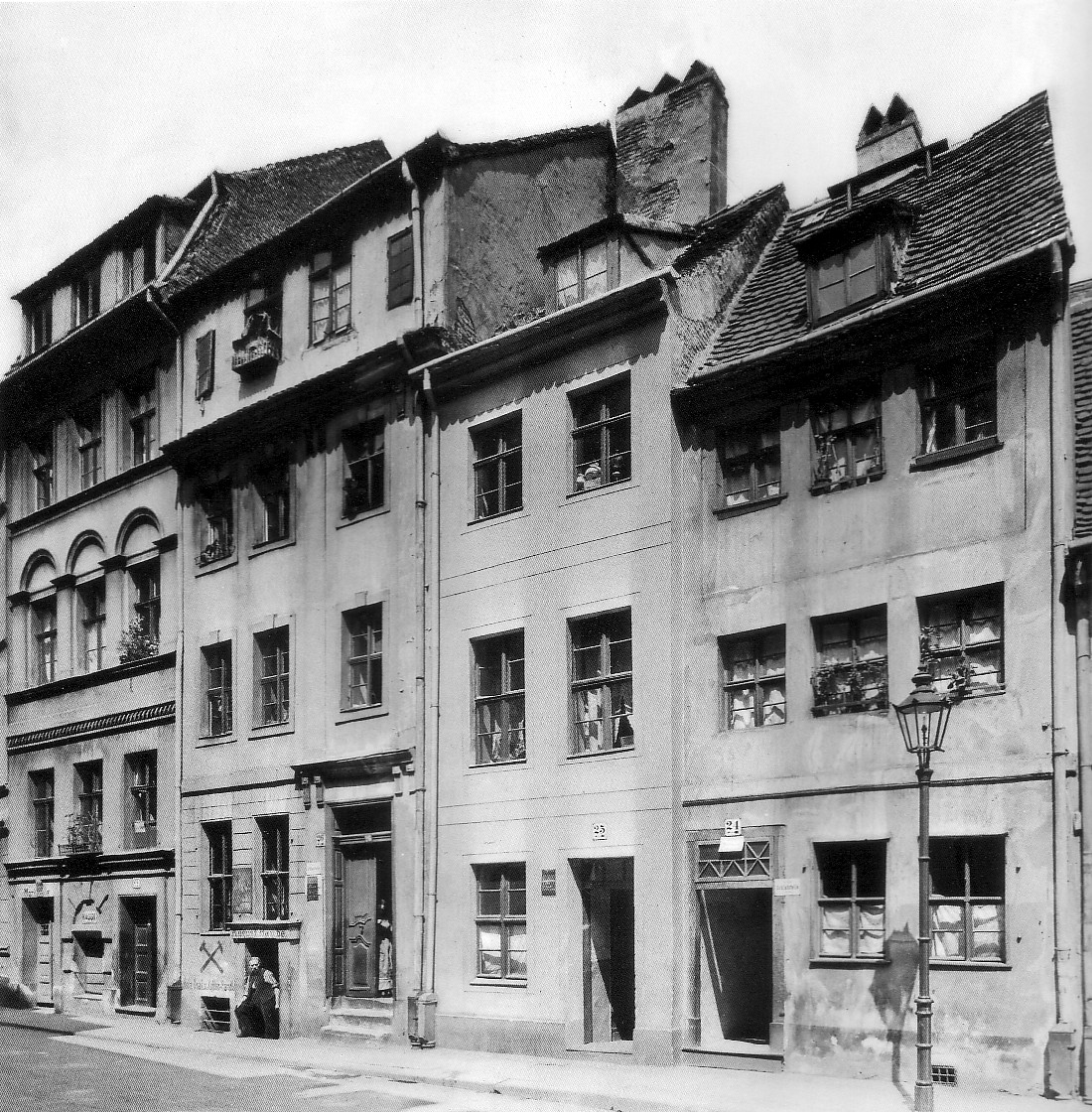
Houses in Petristraße, 1910

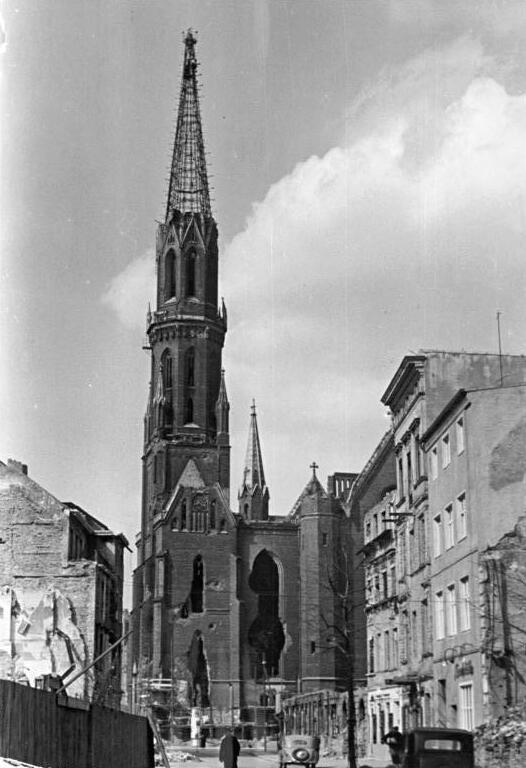
Petrikirche with war damage, 1951

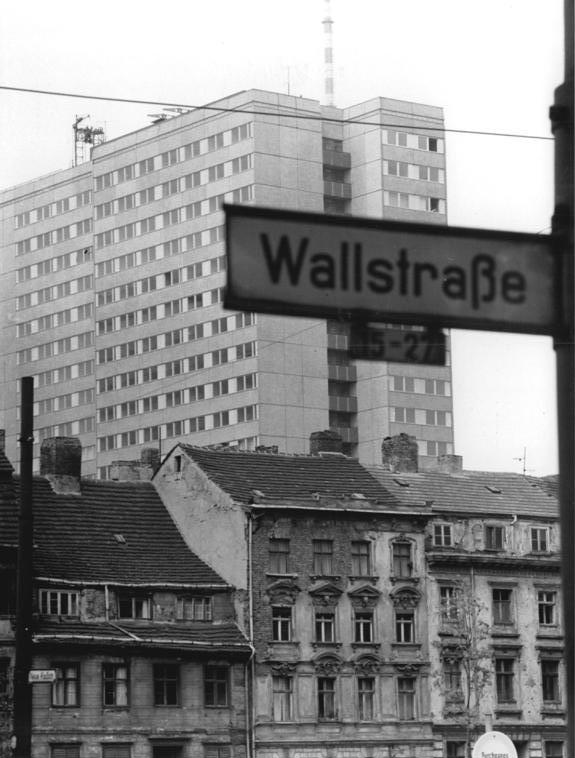
Old buildings on Wallstraße awaiting demolition in 1969, new residential tower blocks in background

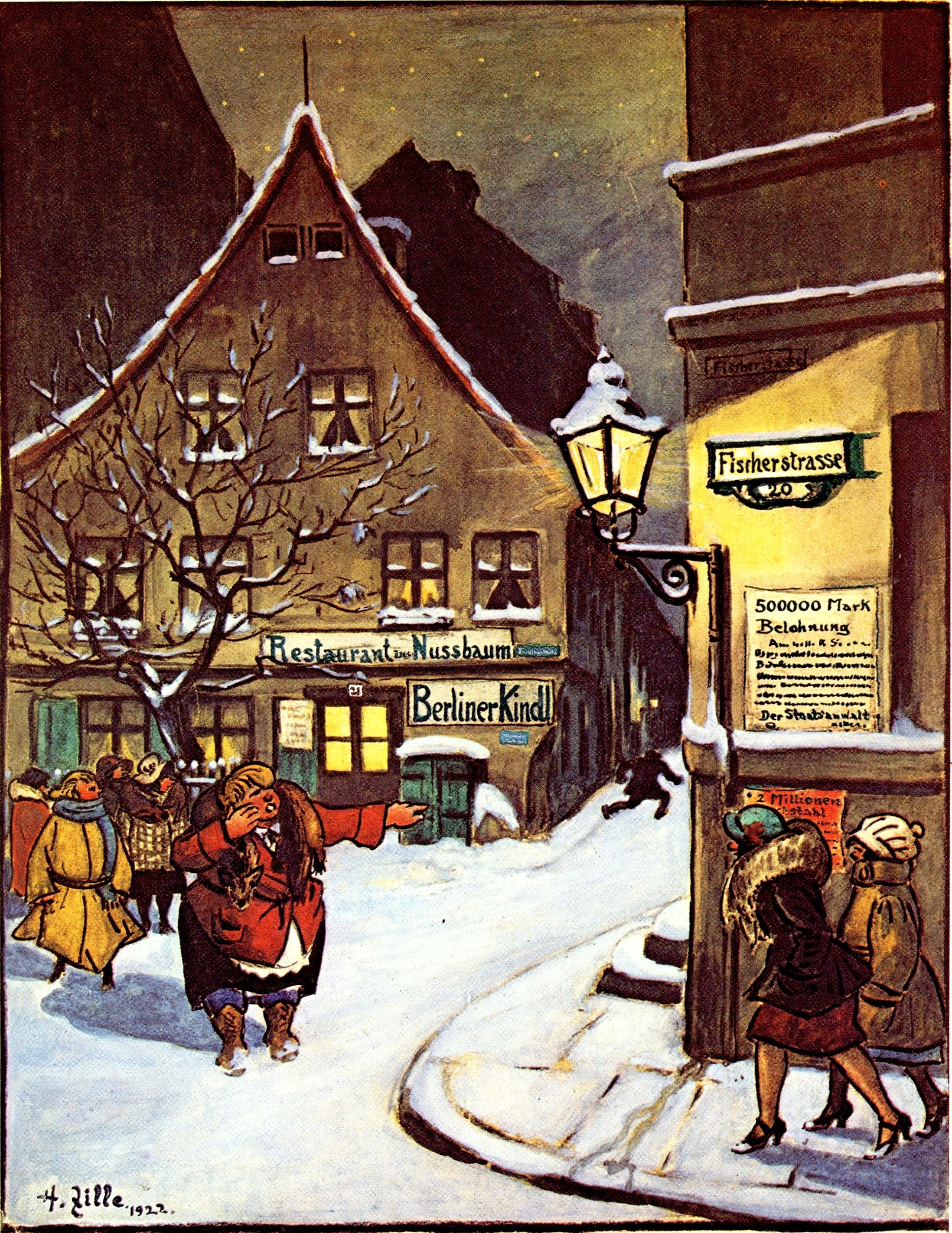
Zum Nußbaum in Fischerstraße; illustrated by Heinrich Zille, 1922

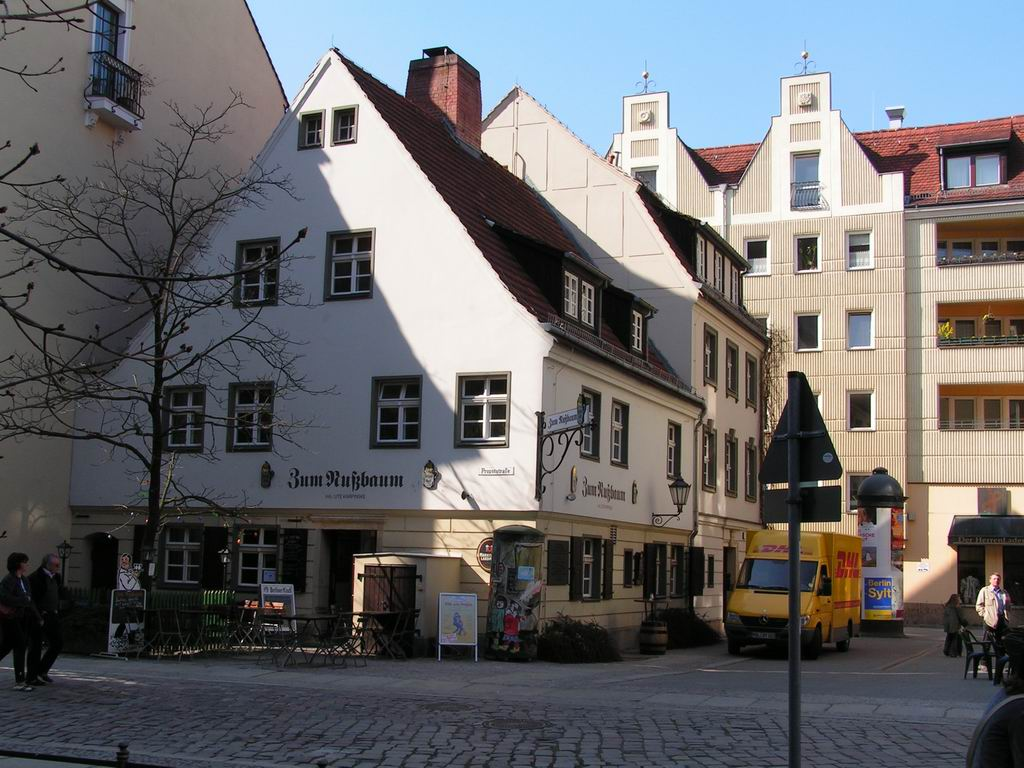
Zum Nußbaum in the Nikolaiviertel, 2005

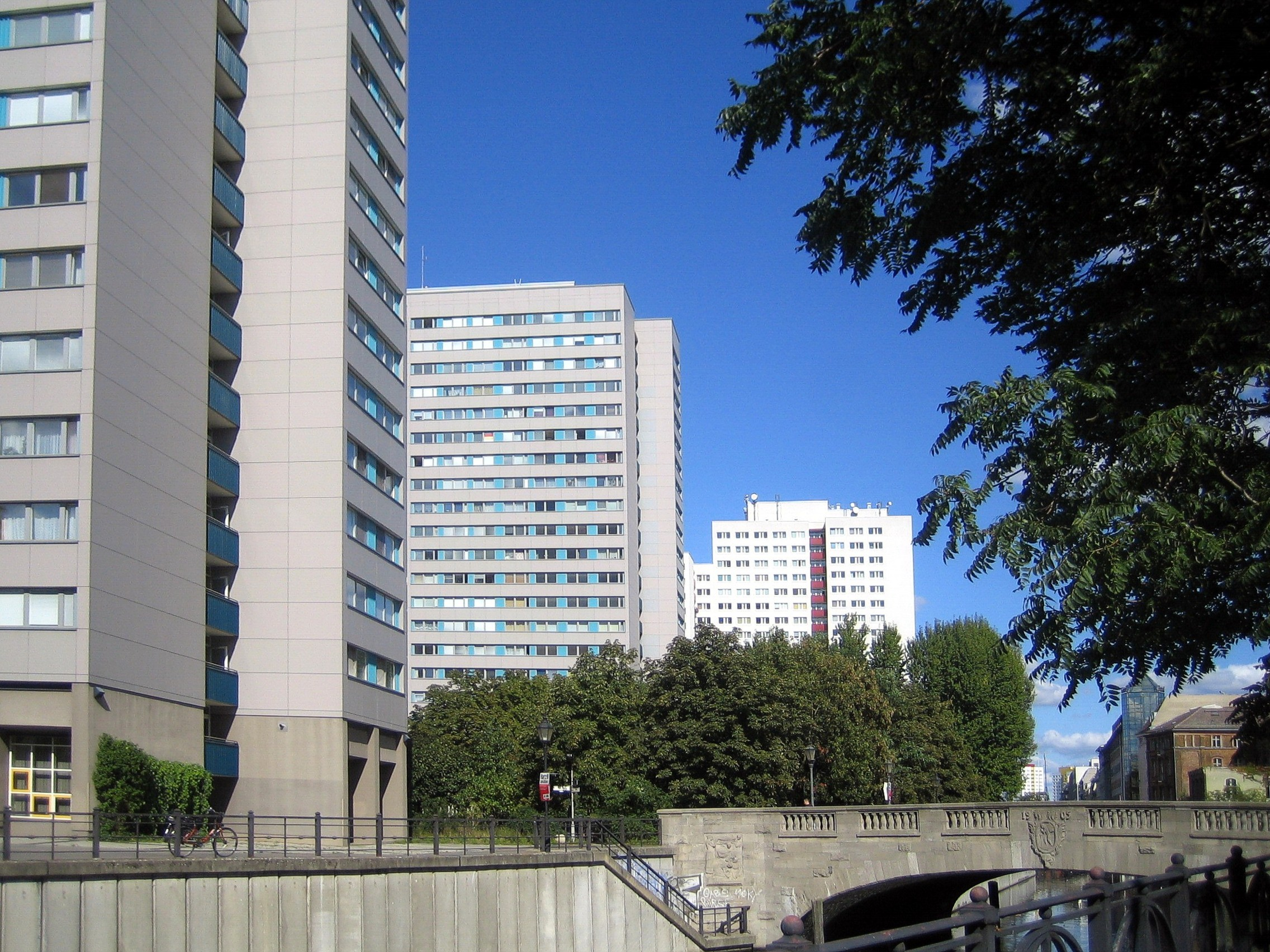
Residential tower blocks and new Grünstraßenbrücke on Fischerinsel, 2009

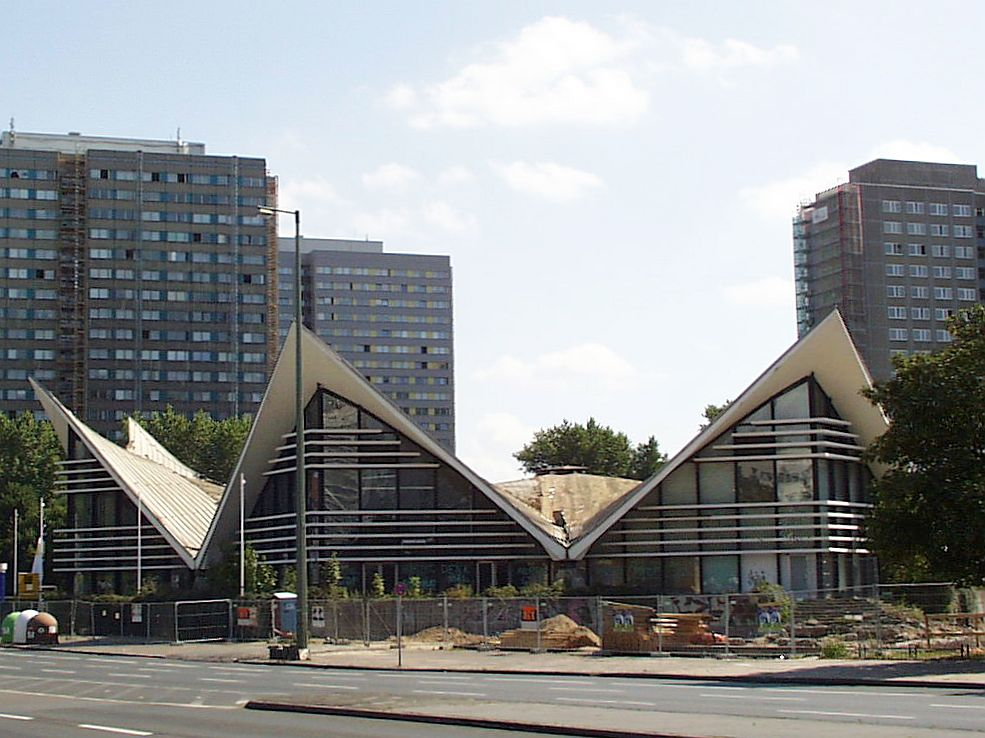
Großgaststätte Ahornblatt, 2000

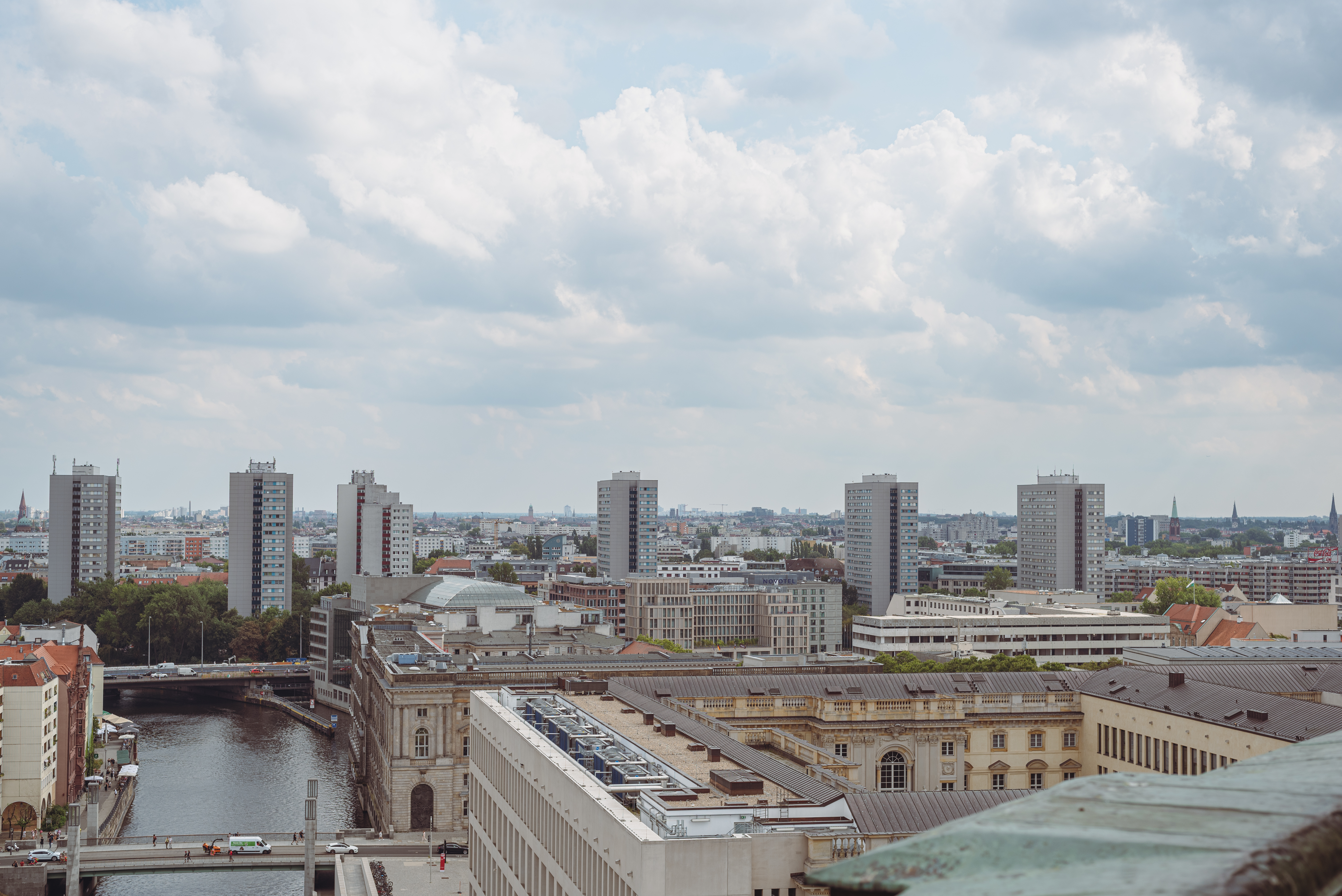
View from Berlin Cathedral to the residential tower blocks on Fischerinsel, 2024
