= Zum Nußbaum =

Coordinates: 52°31′01.7″N 13°24′25.9″E

Zum Nußbaum is a historic inn in Berlin, Germany. Formerly located in Fischerinsel, after its destruction in World War II it was recreated in the nearby Nikolaiviertel.

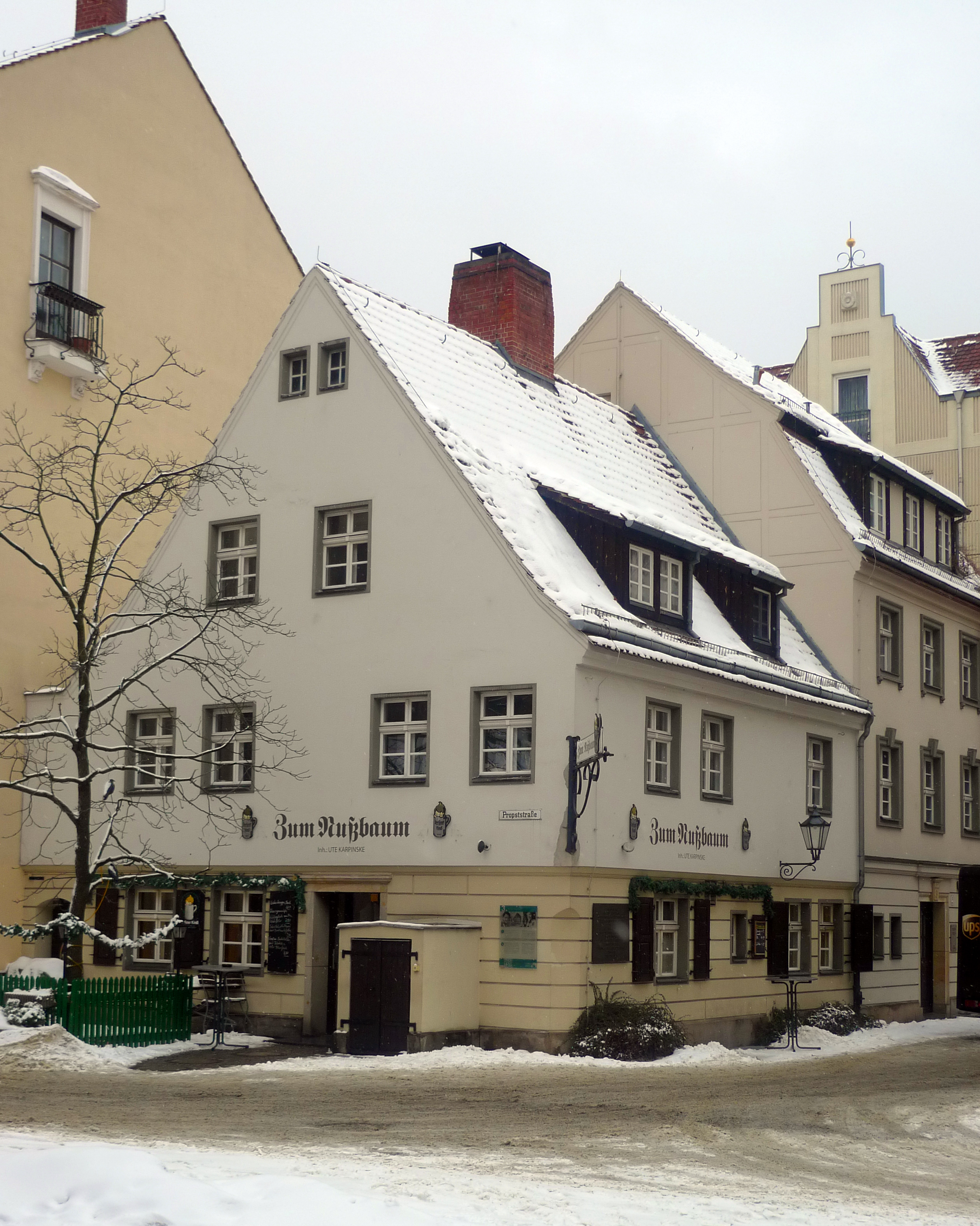
Zum Nußbaum 2010

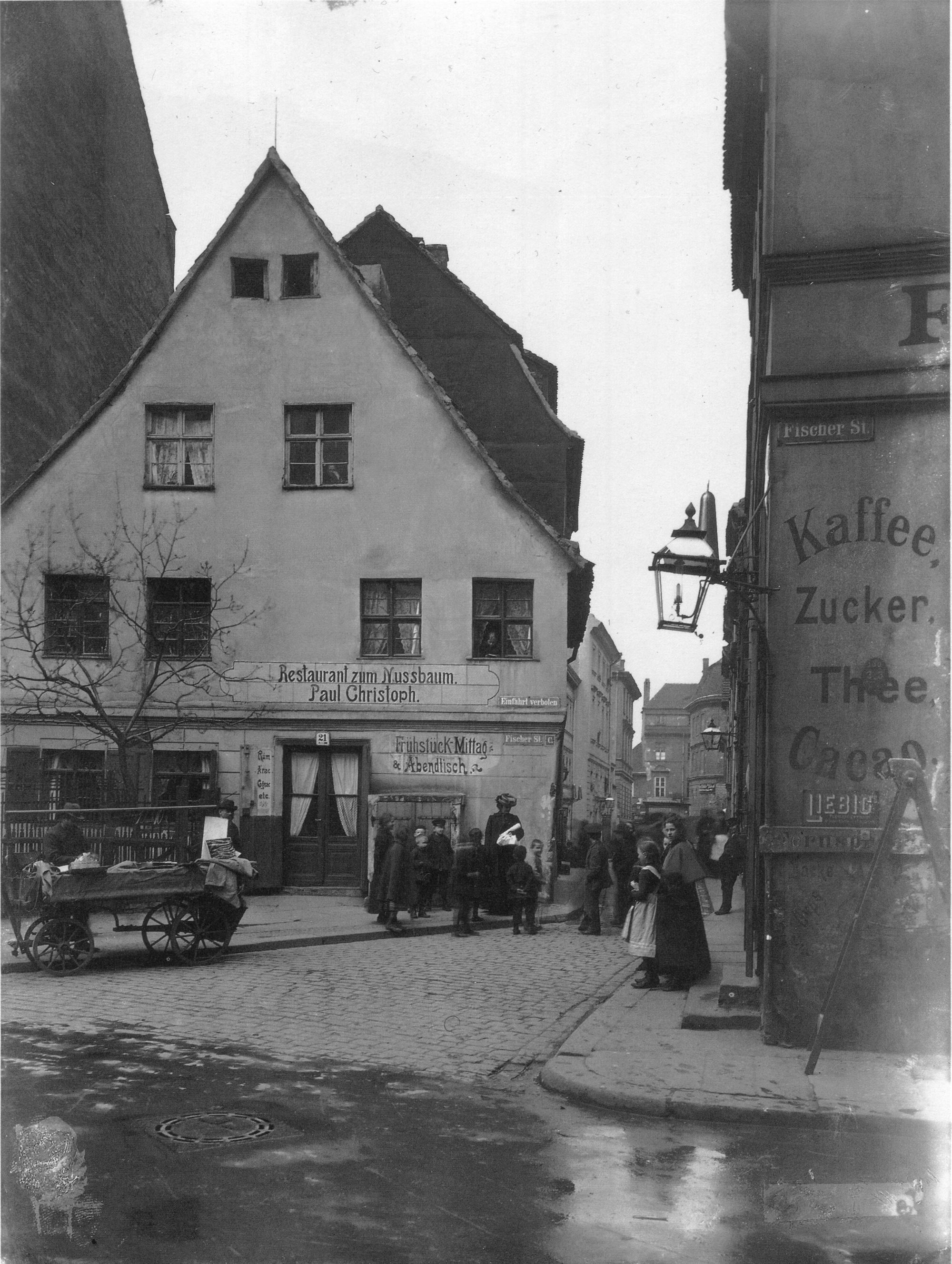
Zum Nußbaum in 1903

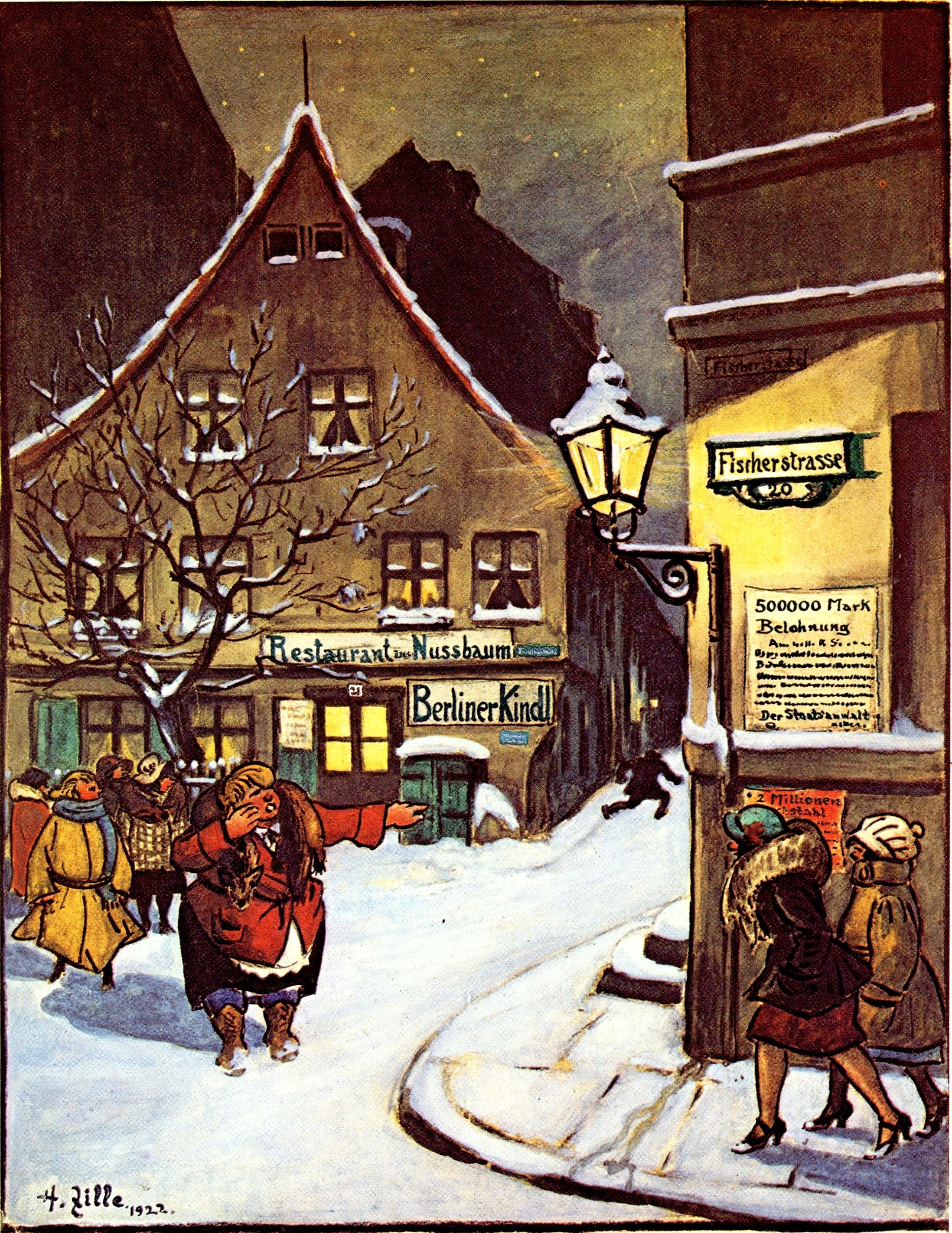
The inn in a painting by Heinrich Zille

The inn, originally located at Fischerstraße 21, was built either in 1505 or in 1705, according to different interpretations of the inscription over the cellar entrance. It was named for the nut tree which formerly stood outside it and was one of the oldest drinking establishments in the city. It was popular with tourists and had been frequented and depicted by artists such as Heinrich Zille and Otto Nagel.

The inn was destroyed in an Allied air-raid in 1943, along with most of the surrounding area. It was recreated in 1987 in the nearby Nikolaiviertel as part of the East German creation of a tourist old town there. It is adjacent to the Nikolaikirche (St. Nicholas' Church).
