= Hermann Knoblauch =

German physicist (1820–1895)

Karl Hermann Knoblauch
- Born: 11 April 1820; Berlin
- Died: 30 June 1895 (aged 75); Baden-Baden
- Education: University of Berlin
- Known for: Thermal Radiation; Diamagnetism; Deutsche Physikalische Gesellschaft; German Academy of Sciences Leopoldina
- Scientific career
- Fields: Physics, Chemistry
- Workplaces: University of Halle; University of Marburg; University of Bonn
- Doctoral advisor: Heinrich Gustav Magnus

Karl Hermann Knoblauch (German pronunciation: [ˈhɛʁman ˈknoːplaʊx, - ˈknɔp-]; 11 April 1820 – 30 June 1895) was a German physicist. He is most notable for his studies of radiant heat. He was one of the six founding members of the Deutsche Physikalische Gesellschaft at Berlin on 14 January 1845.

Knoblauch's father was a well-to-do silk fabrics manufacturer in Berlin. Despite pressure from his father to enter the family business, Knoblauch in his early 20s opted to study mathematics and science at the University of Berlin. There he became one of the star students in the laboratory of Gustav Magnus. Knoblauch's doctorate, completed in Berlin in 1847, described valuable experiments that established some of the optical properties of radiant heat (a.k.a. infrared radiation). In an article describing these experiments Knoblauch wrote that experimental facts are "the only permanent things in science", while abstract models are "transitory" and should be treated with caution and kept separate from the facts, a view that Magnus maintained also.

As a researcher and teacher at the University of Marburg, 1849–53, he produced valuable experimental demonstrations about the nature of diamagnetism. Knoblauch's student and collaborator on the diamagnetism work was John Tyndall. Tyndall and Knoblauch maintained a correspondence on and off over the next 25 years.

Knoblauch moved to the University of Halle in 1853, and remained there for the rest of his career. During his first few years at Halle he did not publish anything. Later his publications were still not as frequent as they had been before moving to Halle. In his Halle years, apart from science teaching and research, he also gave his time to various administrative functions in German science including being president for 17 years of the German Academy of Sciences. He was also the rector (chief administrative officer) of the University of Halle for a while.

His wife Elisabeth (1827–1855) died on September 12 due to complications from childbirth of their son Johannes, who was born on August 27.

== See also ==
- Physical crystallography before X-rays
