= Toralf Arndt =

German footballer

Personal information
- Full name: Toralf Arndt
- Date of birth: 8 November 1966 (age 59)
- Place of birth: East Germany
- Position: Striker

Youth career
- 1. FC Union Berlin

Senior career*
Years	Team	Apps	(Gls)
1988–1990	Rotation Berlin	89	(48)
1991	FC Berlin	13	(0)
1991–1992	FC Rot-Weiß Erfurt	23	(2)
1993	Tennis Borussia Berlin	15	(1)
1993–1995	Reinickendorfer Füchse	28	(1)
1995–1996	FC Berlin	21	(2)
1997–2000	Fortuna Biesdorf	107	(37)
Total		296	(91)
- * Club domestic league appearances and goals

Toralf Arndt, also known as Thoralf Arndt (born 8 November 1966) is a former professional German footballer.

Arndt made 23 appearances in the 2. Bundesliga for FC Rot-Weiß Erfurt during his playing career.
