= Thoralf Knobloch =

German painter

- Born: 1962 (age 63–64); Bautzen, East Germany
- Education: Dresden Academy of Fine Arts
- Known for: Painting

Thoralf Knobloch (born 1962 in Bautzen) is a German contemporary painter based in Dresden. In 1994 he completed his studies at the Hochschule für Bildende Künste Dresden under Prof. Ralf Kerbach. In 2003 Knobloch received the Vattenfall Europe art award. In 2005 he among others represented Germany at the Prague Biennale. Knobloch is represented by Galerie Gebr. Lehmann, Dresden/Berlin, and Wilkinson Gallery, London, where his work was exhibited in 2007 at the opening show of the new gallery space.

His works show ordinary, seemingly trivial moments, observed within the vicinity of the artist and in familiar streets. Once his attention is attracted, the painter cautiously becomes involved with the motif. Often he returns to vary the focus or perspective of the scene. Hereby, his sight is distant, neutral, but not without sympathy. The constant review of his and our perception of what we call reality adds an observative character to his work. This becomes evident especially in works in which Knobloch depicts an identical scene more than once, but from only slightly modified perspectives. The impression of a filmic sequence is generated. Yet, Knobloch’s works do not allow the audience to make up a story, which develops logically according to cause and effect. His works appear to be oddly disconnected, deposed of the temporary. By detracting the scene from a temporal sequence, and by this means from any narrative context, Knobloch directs the perception of the audience onto the artwork itself. In most cases, he puts everyday items in the centre of his work. In doing so, the visible is not deposed of its seemingly vacuity. The power of these works comes from the intense uneventfulness of the seen. The audience is bound to fill the silence with its own memory. Thus Knobloch achieves to evoke poetic associations, and this is where the quality of his works lies. His works are not about subjective experience, but about reflection.

== Solo exhibitions (selected) ==
- 2009 Thoralf Knobloch, Tony Shafrazi Gallery, NY
- 2009 Essen, Trinken, Angeln, Galerie Gebr. Lehmann, Berlin
- 2008 Von Wirklichkeit und Wahrheit, Sparkasse Essen, Essen
- 2007 Thoralf Knobloch, Wilkinson Gallery, London
- 2005 regional & saisonal, Galerie Gebr. Lehmann, Dresden
- 2004 Zweifel und Ruhe, Wilkinson Gallery, London
- 2003 Landpartie und Kuckucksruf, Galerie Michael Neff, Frankfurt/Main
- 2003 Petit Côte, Vattenfall Europe, Berlin
- 2002 Streif- & Jagdzüge, Galerie Gebr. Lehmann, Dresden
