= Johannes Knoblauch =

German mathematician (1855–1915)

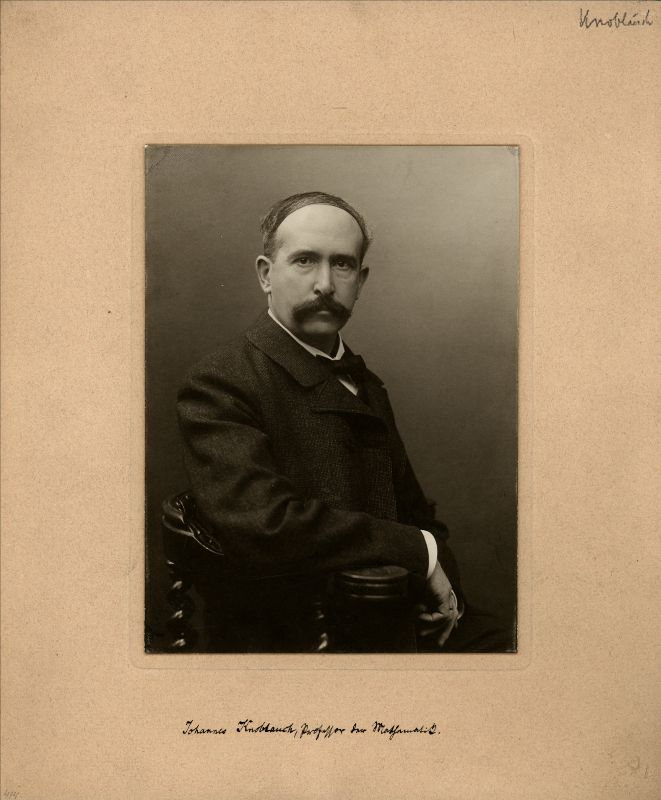
Johannes Knoblauch

Johannes Knoblauch (27 August 1855, Halle (Saale) – 22 July 1915, Berlin) was a German mathematician.

== Biography ==
Johannes Knoblauch, whose father was the physics professor Karl Hermann Knoblauch, studied law, mathematics and physics from 1872 in Halle, Heidelberg and Berlin. At the Friedrich Wilhelm University (later renamed the Humboldt University of Berlin) he studied from 1874 to 1878 and from 1880 to 1883 and received his Promotion (Ph.D.) in 1882 and his Habilitation in 1883. His doctoral dissertation "Ueber die Allgemeine Wellenfläche" was supervised by Karl Weierstrass. Knoblauch was a teacher for the academic year 1878–1879 at (his former school) the state Gymnasium in Halle and from 1879 to 1880 at Berlin's Gymnasium zum Grauen Kloster. At the Friedrich Wilhelm University of Berlin, after his Habilitation in 1883 he was appointed Privatdozent. There in 1889 he was appointed professor extraordinarius and retained that academic post until his death. From 1883 to 1885 his friend Heinrich von Stein stayed with him in the Knoblauch-Haus at Poststrasse 23. In 1906/07 Knoblauch worked with Kazimierz Żorawski on new group theoretical methods.

Knoblauch was a founding member of the Berlin Mathematical Society. For 13 years he was a member of the editorial board of the Crelle's Journal.

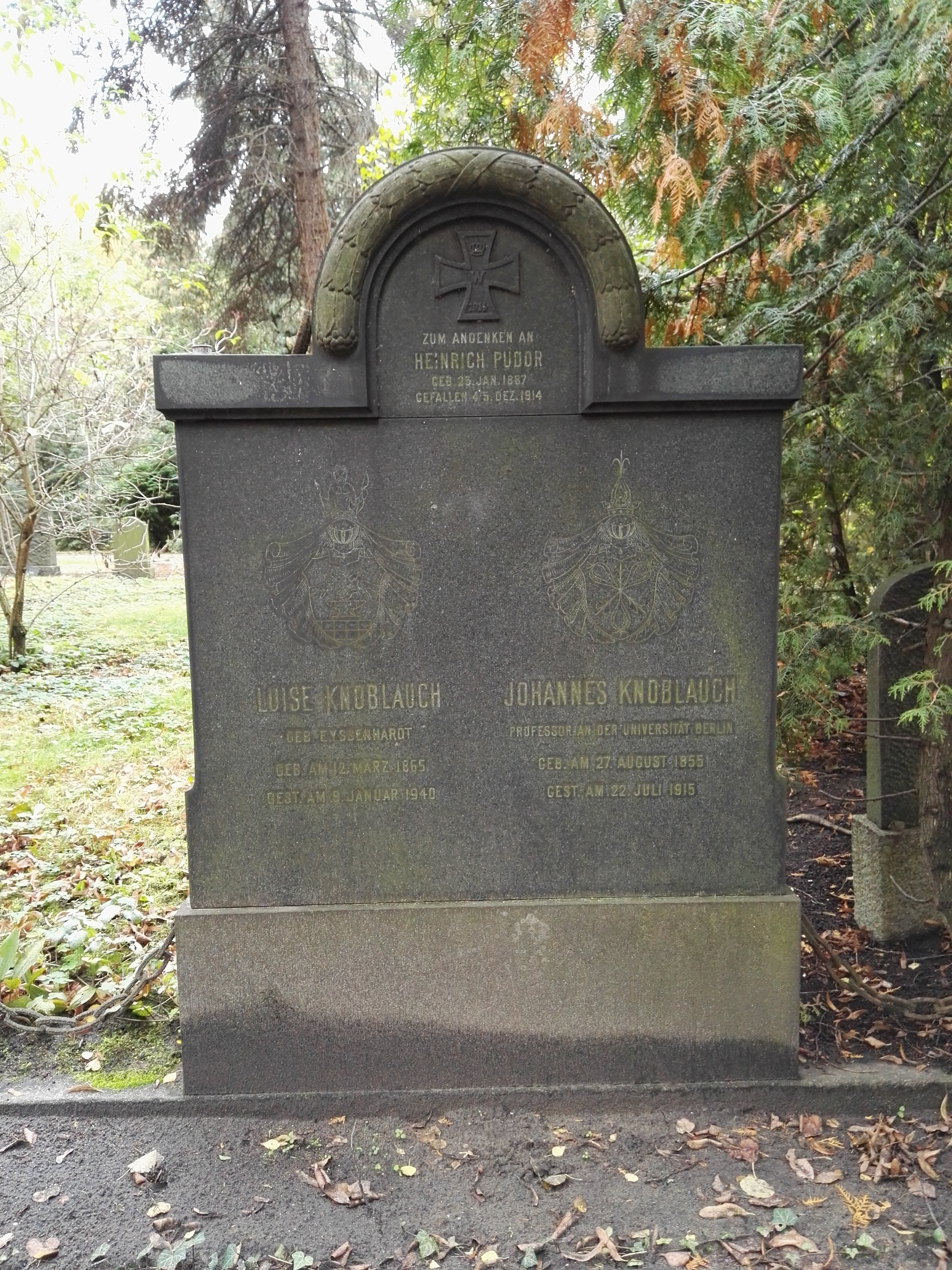
Gravesite

In 1884, he married Luise née Eyssenhardt (1865–1940). The grave of the married couple is in the cemetery Alter Friedhof der St.-Nikolai- und St.-Marien-Gemeinde in the Pankow borough of Berlin.

== Selected publications ==
- Theorie der algebraischen Curven und Flächen höherer Ordnung. 1885
- Einleitung in die allgemeine Theorie der krummen Flächen. 1888
- Grundlagen der Differentialgeometrie. 1913
- Ueber Biegungscovarianten. 1892. doi:10.1515/crll.1893.111.277
- Vorlesungen über die Theorie der Elliptischen Functionen. 1913
- Die Biegungs-Invarianten und Kovarianten von gegebener Ordnung. 1906. doi:10.1515/crll.1906.131.247
- Ein Bildnis Leonhard Eulers in Privatbesitz. 1911
- Die Differentialgleichung der Flächen mit isometrischen Krümmungslinien. 1912

=== As an editor ===
- Mathematische Werke von Karl Weierstrass, edited by Johannes Knoblauch, Georg Hettner, and Rudolf Rothe
  - Abhandlungen-1, Math. Werke. vol. 1. Berlin, 1894
  - Abhandlungen-2, Math. Werke. vol. 2. Berlin, 1895
  - Abhandlungen-3, Math. Werke. vol. 3. Berlin, 1903
  - Vorl. ueber die Theorie der Abelschen Transcendenten, Math. Werke. Bd. 4. Berlin, 1902
  - Vorl. ueber Variationsrechnung, Math. Werke. vol. 7. Leipzig, 1927
