= Waterfront Communications =

- Industry: Communication, Lobbyism
- Founded: 1993
- Defunct: 15 December 2020
- Headquarters: Hellerup, Copenhagen, Denmark
- Key people: Lars Poulsen
- Number of employees: 5–9 (1 January 2013)
- Website: www.waterfront.dk

Waterfront Communications A/S (or just Waterfront) is a Danish PR- and Lobbying Bureau, and was created in 1993 by the former member of the European Parliament Lars Poulsen. The bureau is a part of the worldwide media network Media Consulta. The company is located in Hellerup, north of Copenhagen.

== Controversy ==
At the 13 January 2013 an internal mail correspondence, was revealed by the Danish news magazine "21 Sunday" (Danish: "21 Søndag"), that the Danish Railway Operator (DSB) had hired Waterfront to keep the freelance journalist Lars Abild engaged in something else than writing about DSB.
