= Märkisches Museum =

Museum of the city of Berlin and the region around Berlin in Berlin

Coordinates: 52°30′49″N 13°24′53″E

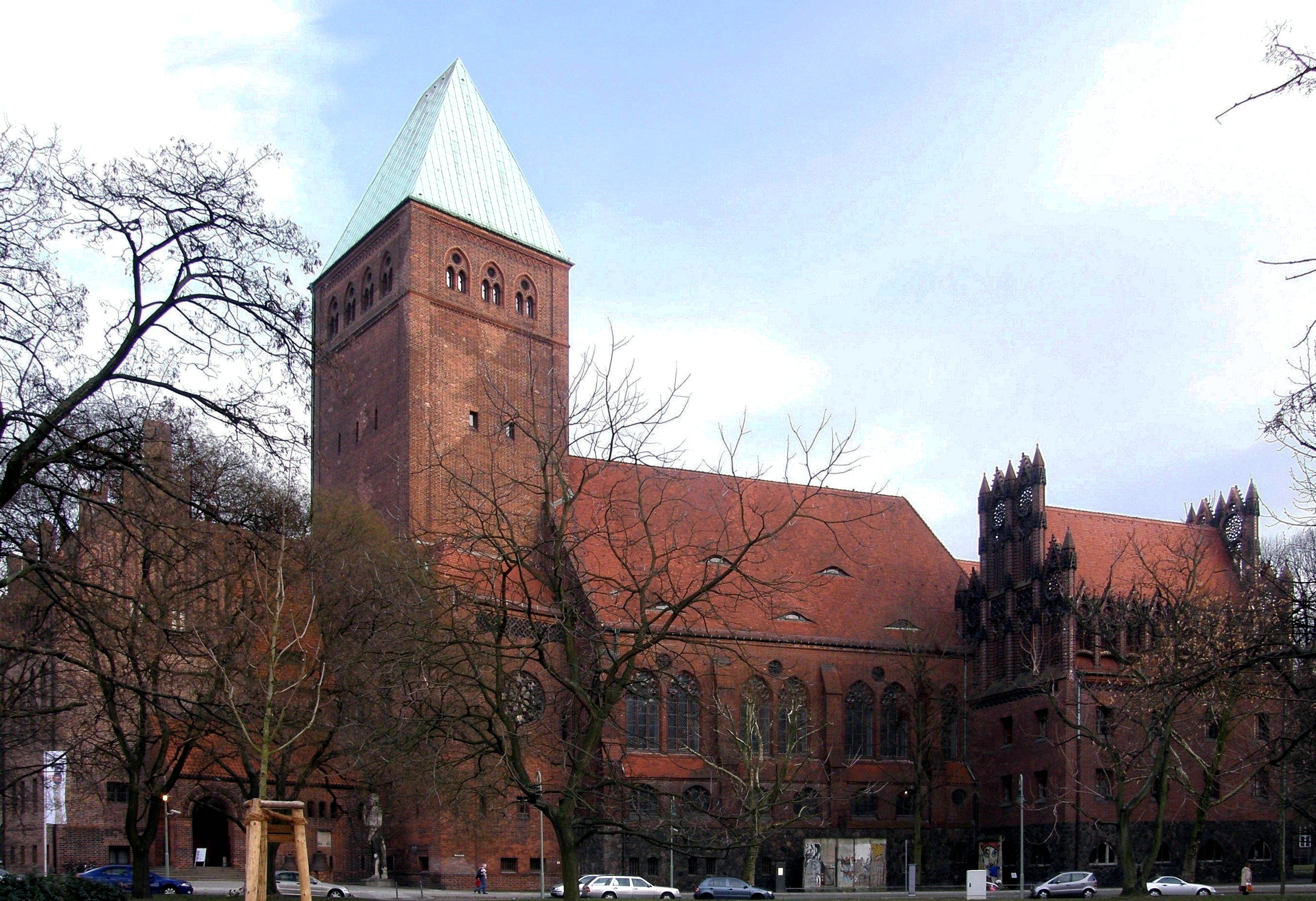
Märkisches Museum

Märkisches Museum, Berlin

The Märkisches Museum (Marcher Museum; originally Märkisches Provinzial-Museum, i.e. Museum of the Province of the March [of Brandenburg]) is a museum in Mitte, Berlin. Founded in 1874 as the museum of the city of Berlin and its political region, the March of Brandenburg, it occupies a building on the northern edge of Köllnischer Park, facing the Spree, which was designed by Ludwig Hoffmann and completed in 1908. It is now the main facility of the Stiftung Stadtmuseum Berlin, Landesmuseum für Kultur und Geschichte Berlins, the City of Berlin museum foundation, which also operates four other sites.

The museum closed for extensive renovations in 2023. Reopening is planned by 2029.

== Background ==
In the second half of the 19th century, Berlin grew very rapidly. The foundation stone of a new, much larger town hall, the Rotes Rathaus, was laid in 1861. The changes provoked interest amongst the bourgeoisie in the city's past and in preserving what had not already been lost. The Verein für die Geschichte Berlins (Association for the history of Berlin) was founded. It included early photographers such as Friedrich Albert Schwartz who began to document the changes to the city, assembling one of the first systematic photographic portraits of a city and its architecture. Beginning in the 1860s, they urged the foundation of a regional history museum. Ernst Friedel, a judge and antiquarian who had personally collected prehistoric and historic objects and paintings from Brandenburg for this purpose, persuaded the Magistrat, the executive council of Berlin, to form a new department of "Collections" and Friedel was appointed to head it together with the existing library and archive. On 9 October 1874 with the city's official acceptance of his plan, the Märkisches Provinzialmuseum (Provincial museum of the March) was founded. This was the first museum in Berlin to be completely independent of the Prussian crown. It had a budget of only 2,000 Goldmarks a year for purchases, and was therefore dependent from the start on donations from foundations and individuals. The Emperor later contributed a small fund for the purchase of photographs of the city.

== Early history ==
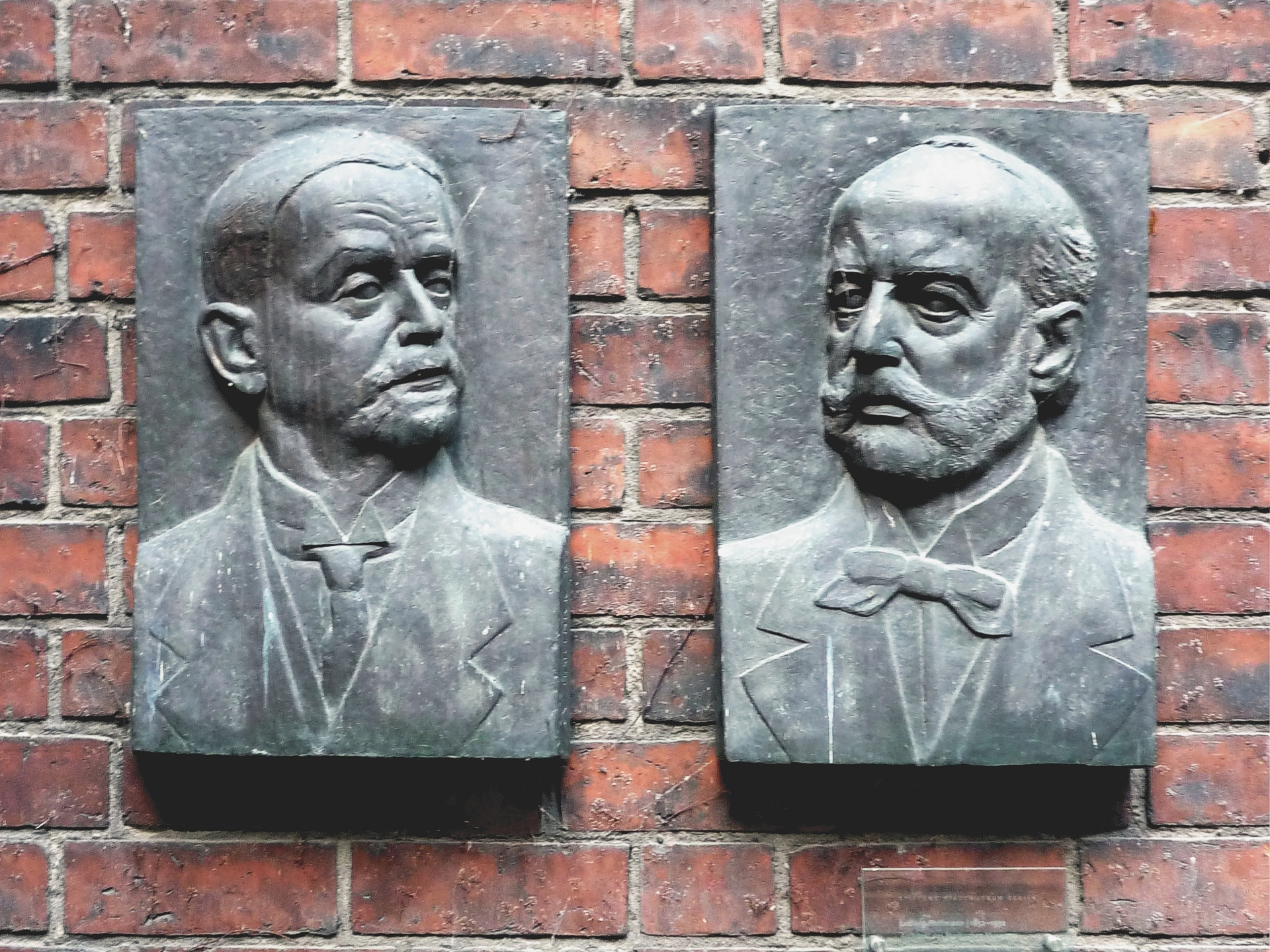
Reliefs of Ludwig Hoffmann and Ernst Friedel, by Evelyn Hartnick

In March 1875, Friedel put out a call for the donation or loan of objects of historical or scientific interest, which was so successful that the collection had to move late that year from the old town hall to the Palais Podewils, a Baroque residence in Klosterstraße, and in 1880 to the former town hall of Cölln. At that time it had over 29,500 objects. In addition, Berlin in the "Gründerzeit" was full of demolitions and excavations, which yielded both fragments of old buildings and prehistoric and medieval finds. The collection was crowded and in particular the large pieces taken from churches could not be properly displayed. However, the inventory was not without its uses: an executioner's axe from the collection was used on 16 August 1878 to behead Max Hödel after his attempted assassination of Emperor Wilhelm I.

At the urging of Friedel, a competition was held in 1892 for a building to house the collection, but the results were disappointing. 76 entries were received, but the winning design, by Wilhelm Möller, proved on examination to be both unsuitable and too expensive, and the architect had died, so the project was shelved.

== Building ==
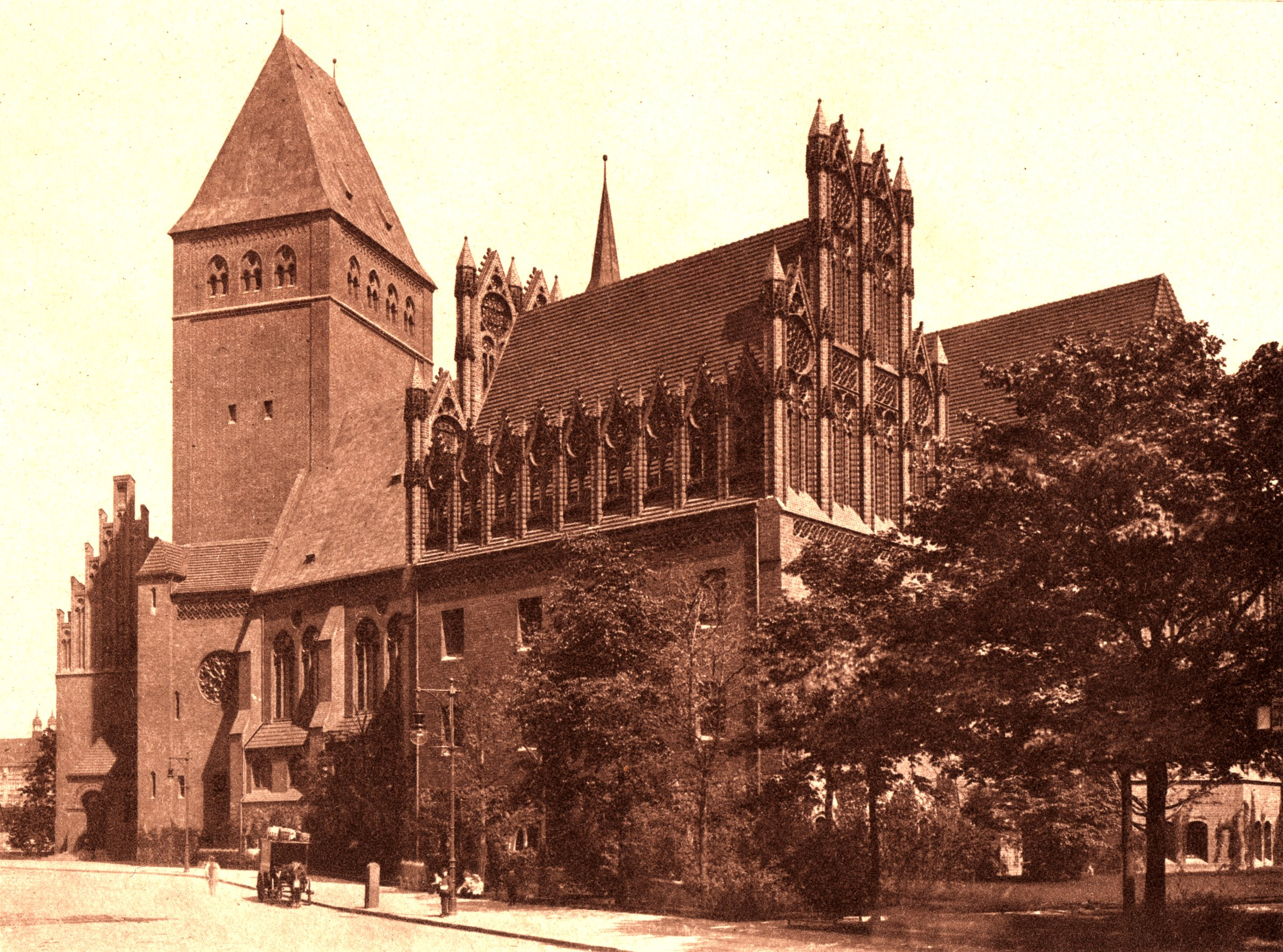
Märkisches Museum seen from Wallstraße in 1908, the year it opened

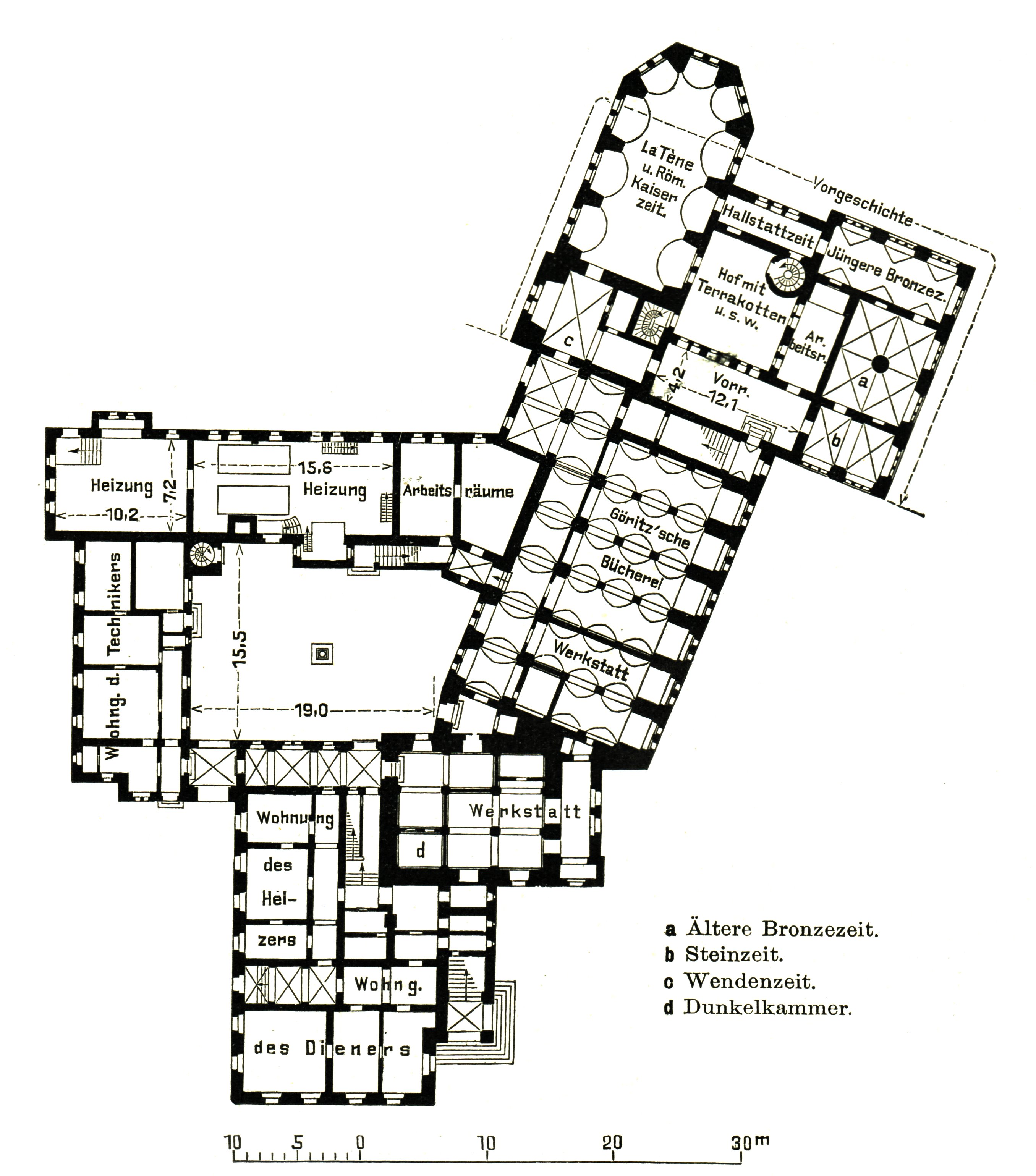
Ground floor plan

Creating a new building for the museum was the first large task for Ludwig Hoffmann after his appointment in 1896 as Stadtbaurat (chief of construction) for the city of Berlin. His first sketches date to that year; the plans were accepted the following year, and construction began in 1899 and was completed in 1907. It was not ready for occupation until 1908, 12 years after the start of the project. Meanwhile, in 1899, in advance of the demolition of the Cölln town hall, some of the collection had been placed in storage and some shown in temporary quarters on the first floor of one of the city's covered markets, until 1904.

Hoffmann designed the museum as a complex of six differing buildings which echo Brandenburg brick architecture of periods from the Gothic to the Renaissance in a "historical collage", in order to reflect the contents of the museum and evoke the "atmosphere" of various times and types of building. Part of his reasoning was that Berlin no longer had much of an old centre. The buildings are grouped around two courtyards and based on historic details which he had studied and sketched throughout the region; his "quotations" are accurate copies, but there is disagreement as to the originals, as in a façade which has been said to be based on the town hall at Tangermünde or on St. Catherine's Church in Brandenburg an der Havel, and the hip-roofed tower, 53 metres (174 ft) high, based on the bergfried (keep) of the Bishop's Castle in Wittstock or on the cathedral of Ratzeburg. Hoffmann also modified the layout of Köllnischer Park to make an attractive setting for the museum.

The interior of the museum also seeks to evoke the atmosphere of different historical settings (as was then the fashion in provincial museums in Germany). For example, the low vaulted ceilings and roughly plastered walls on the ground floor were intended to suggest great age and housed the displays on prehistory, where the display cases for funerary urns and flint axes were rough in form; the setting for the medieval altars and sculptures was a vaulted Gothic chapel echoing medieval church interiors; weapons were shown in a room with thick columns, recalling a monastery; and rococo porcelain and snuffboxes were displayed in elegant vitrines in a light and airy room on the second floor. There were a total of about 50 exhibition galleries. The visitor was led repeatedly back to the central vaulted Great Hall.

A week before the opening on 10 June 1908, Emperor Wilhelm II and Empress Auguste Viktoria toured the exhibits for two hours. The museum is now judged to be amongst Hoffmann's most important works, and also one of the most outstanding German museum buildings.

Details of the building
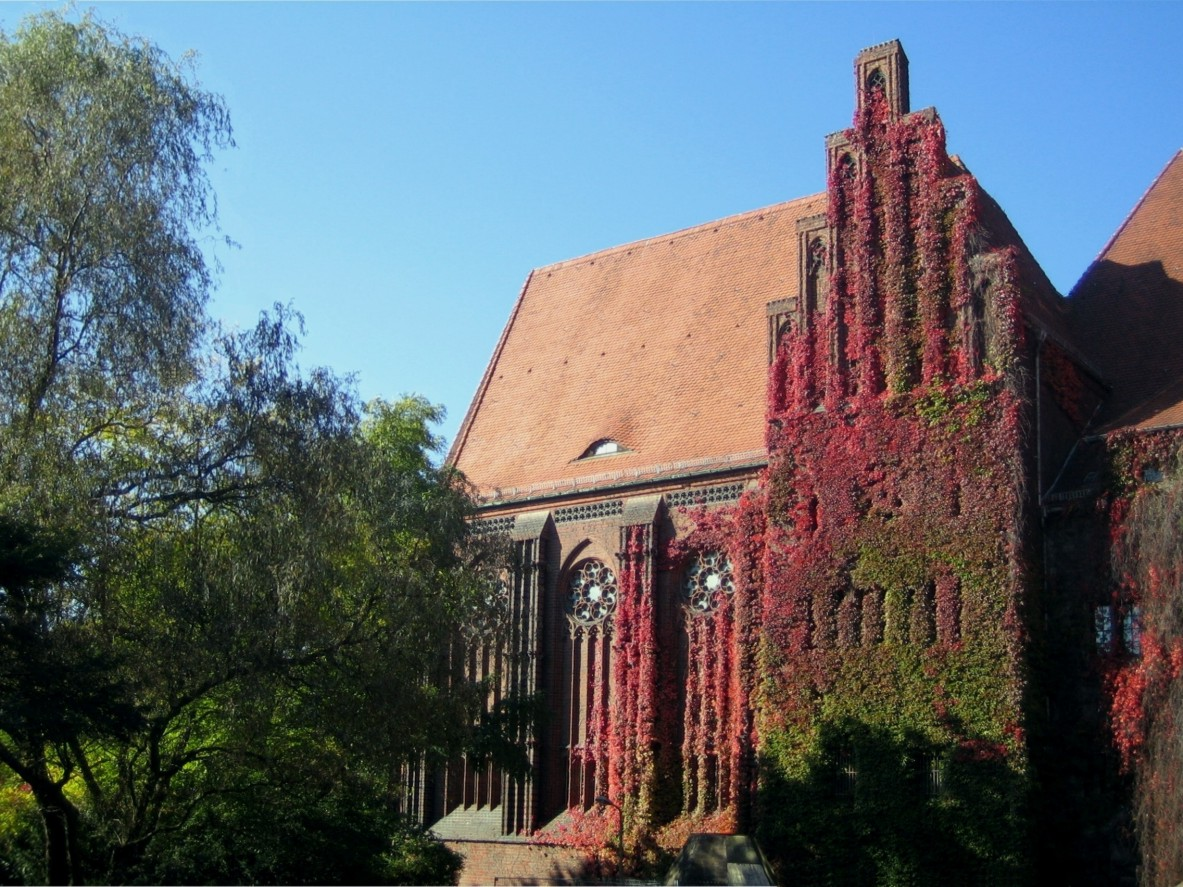
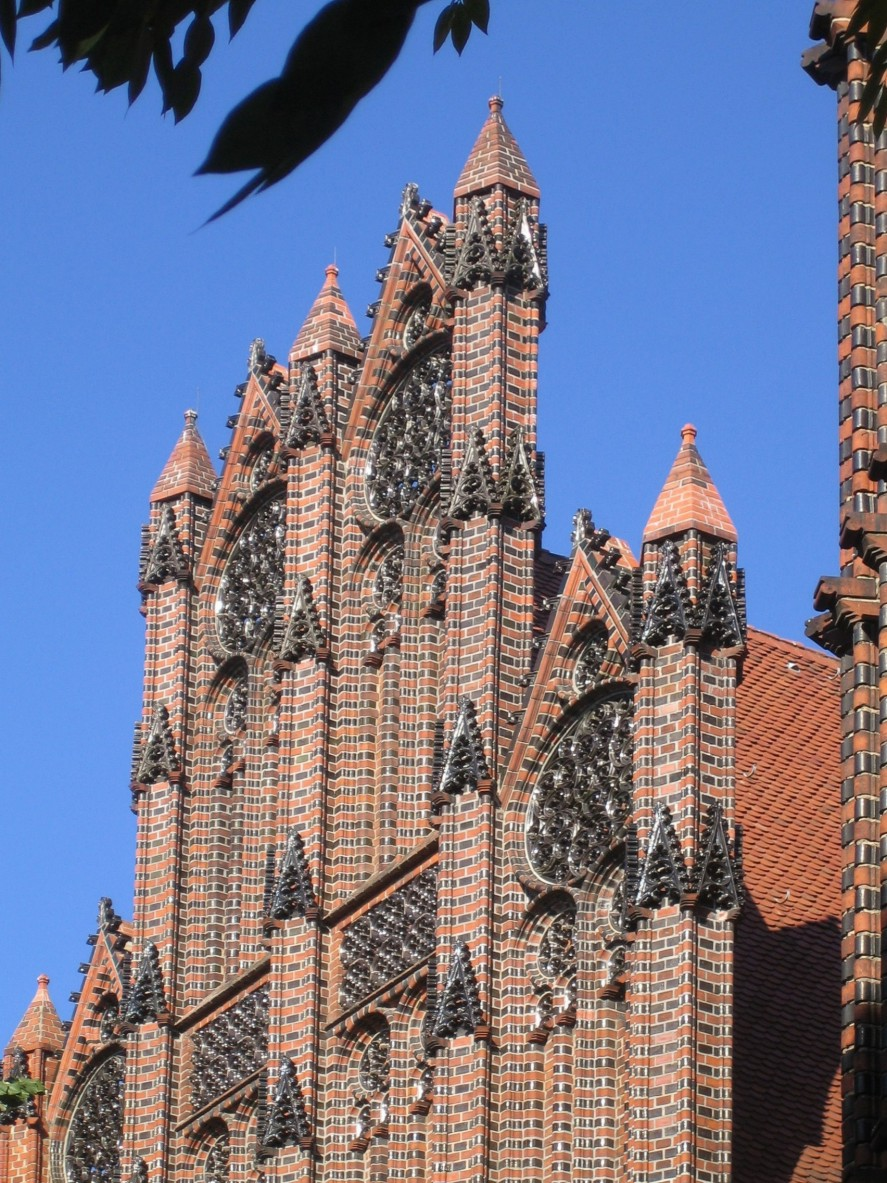
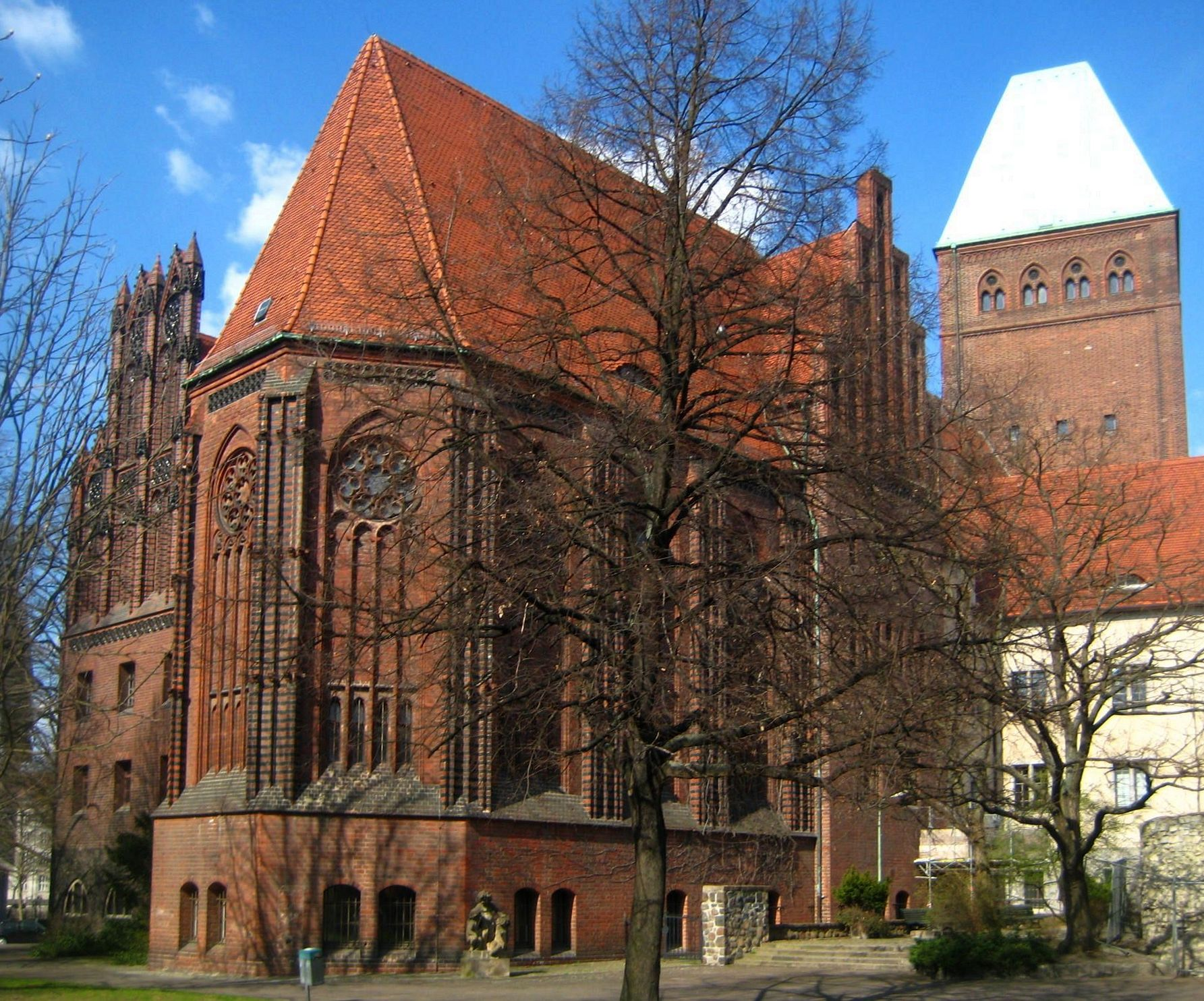
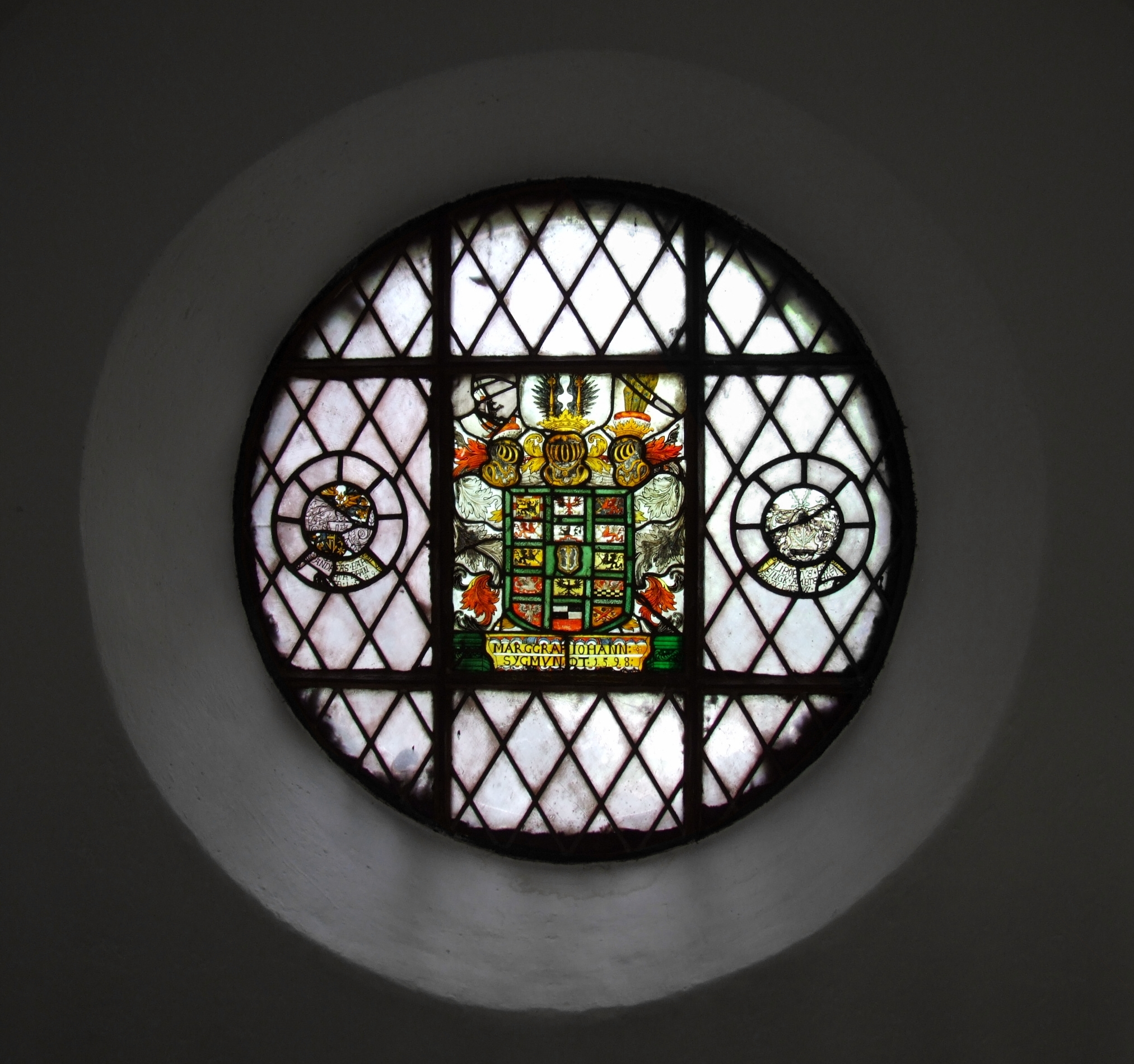

== History since 1908 ==
=== Before and after World War I ===
The museum was widely praised and popular, attracting approximately 70,000 visitors a year and supported by the Verein für das Märkische Museum, which included some wealthy and prominent Berliners. Especially after the creation of Greater Berlin in 1920, it focussed more on the city than on the Mark Brandenburg. However, it was affected by the First World War and the revolution and out of control inflation which followed it.

In 1925, Walter Stengel became Director of the museum, the first in that position with professional training and experience in art history and museum science. He left Hoffmann's gallery displays largely untouched, but did introduce electric lighting in 1932, over the objections of the now retired architect. He also experimented with recorded commentary in the galleries, using gramophones. He used the museum extension, the 18th-century Ermeler House, to display the Alfred Cassirer collection of artworks, including several works of French Impressionism, as a unified whole, and to draw visitors back to the museum, held spectacular special exhibitions, some of them offsite. The exhibition celebrating the 70th birthday of the popular illustrator Heinrich Zille in 1928, the first extensive exhibition of his work, was especially popular.

=== Under the Third Reich ===
After Hitler's seizure of power in 1933, the Märkisches Museum was like other cultural facilities in Germany incorporated into the Nazi system. Stengel collaborated with the Nazis, in the interest of the museum as he saw it, acquiring art objects from Jews in forced sales and securing valuable antiques in 1938 when the regime seized all gold and silver items from Jews. After the war, he stated that these items were held in escrow and not simply merged into the museum's holdings.

The museum remained popular until the outbreak of the Second World War in 1939, when it was closed and its collection placed in storage. Much was lost, and the building itself was severely damaged.

=== Under Soviet occupation and in the German Democratic Republic ===
When the war ended, the museum was located in the Soviet sector of Berlin which became the capital of the German Democratic Republic (East Germany). The first few galleries were reopened in 1946. Some items were rescued from buildings destroyed in the war, but the need for repairs to the building restricted available space and most of the natural history collection had been lost, so the decision was made to focus on cultural history. In a restoration which took place from 1953 to 1958, the interior was subdivided by partitions and lowered ceilings, increasingly destroying Hoffmann's gallery scheme, and museum staff were required to present history on a Marxist–Leninist basis.

After the Berlin Wall divided the city in 1961, the decision was eventually made to establish a separate Berlin Museum in West Berlin. Founded in 1962, this was housed in the baroque Collegienhaus of the former Kammergericht in the Lindenstraße in Kreuzberg, and the collection was limited to cultural history so that the two museums could be eventually reunited with as few problems as possible.

=== Since reunification ===
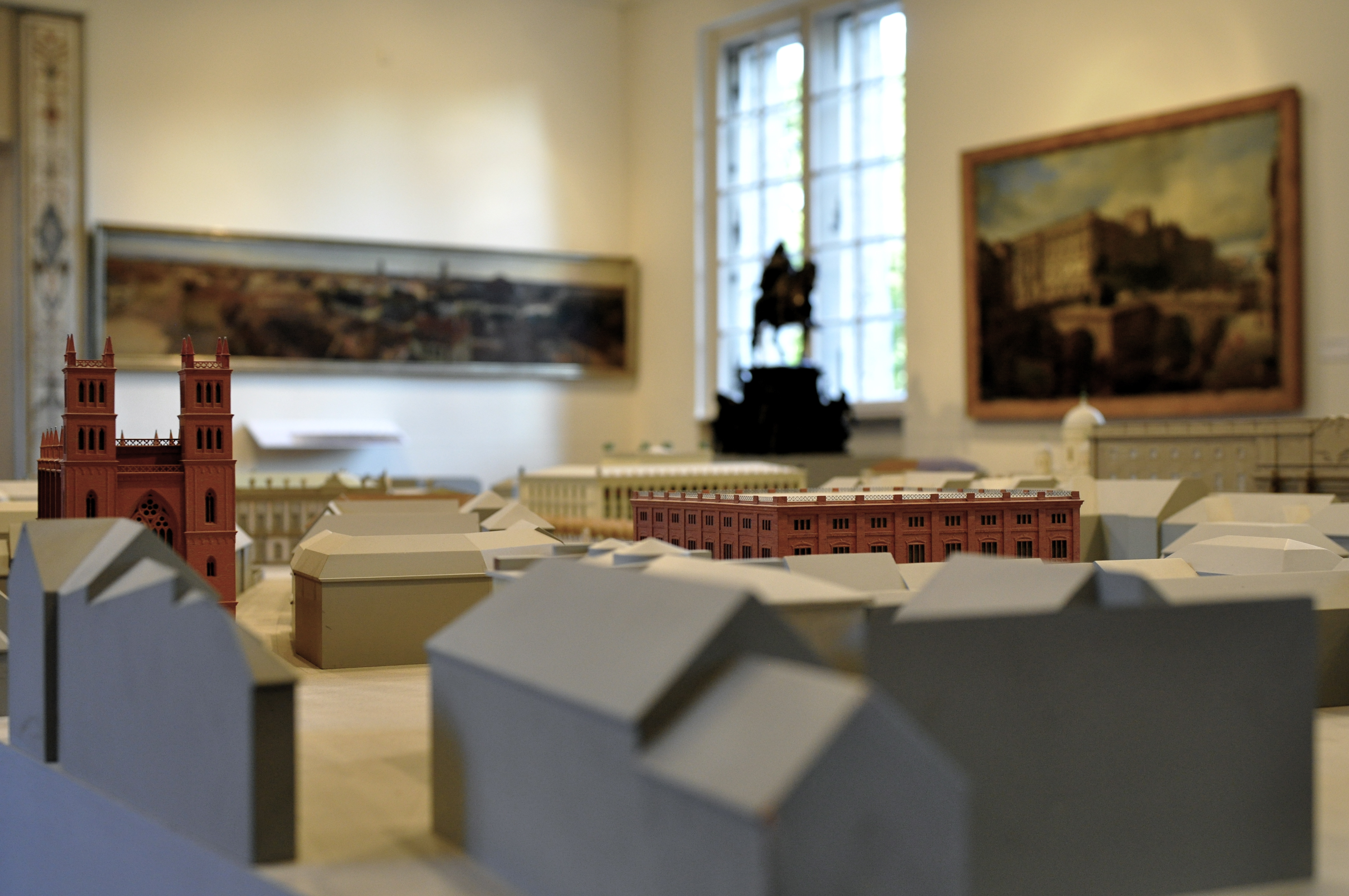
Exhibition space in the museum, 2011

After German reunification, five years of discussion and planning culminated in the foundation in 1995 of the Stiftung Stadtmuseum Berlin, Landesmuseum für Kultur und Geschichte Berlins, which now unites several formerly independent museums under the City of Berlin, with the Märkisches Museum as primary location. The building itself was extensively renovated in 1996–2001, including building out of new space under roofs and the removal of added partitions so that visitors again experience the sequence of galleries much as Hoffmann intended, but a large part of the museum's holdings is in storage in Spandau for want of space. The Senate of Berlin plans to unify currently scattered holdings in Mitte, in and around the Märkisches Museum, and has thus projected an extension to the building, which is to incorporate the nearby Marinehaus, designed by Otto Liesheim and built in 1908–10. The existing museum is to house the coverage from prehistory to the start of the 20th century, and the extension, recent history. The Senate acquired that building in 1993, and the architectural competition to design the extension and conversion was won by the London firm of Stanton Williams in 2008.

The Stiftung Stadtmuseum Berlin originally had 16 locations. Under the consolidation plan, the Stiftung Stadtmuseum Berlin found other owners for the Nicolaihaus, the Domäne Dahlem, an open-air museum of agriculture on the original estate at Dahlem, and the Sport Museum in the Sportforum near the Olympic Stadium, and closed the Museum of Hairdressing in Marzahn, the Sammlung Kindheit und Jugend (children's museum), the Natural History collection and its former administrative offices, and relocated them to the Märkisches Museum. As of February 2011 the childhood section in the Märkisches Museum was showing an exhibition of model shops. Closure of the Galgenhaus is also planned. The Marinehaus is to be used for especially popular displays on the history of Berlin in the 20th century while the original building undergoes thorough restoration, and the foundation continues to operate museums in the 18th-century Knoblauchhaus, the rococo Ephraim Palais, and St. Nicholas' Church, all in the nearby Nikolaiviertel. It also has a museum village in the Zehlendorf district, the Museumsdorf Düppel, which is a recreation of a medieval village.

Friedrichsfelde Palace, Friedrichsfelde, formerly also part of the foundation, was returned in January 2009 to Tierpark Berlin, the zoo in its former grounds. The Jewish Museum grew out of the West Berlin Berlin Museum, but in 1998 was declared autonomous and in 2001 became a federal institution, and as such is independent of the Stiftung Stadtmuseum Berlin.

Historical photographs

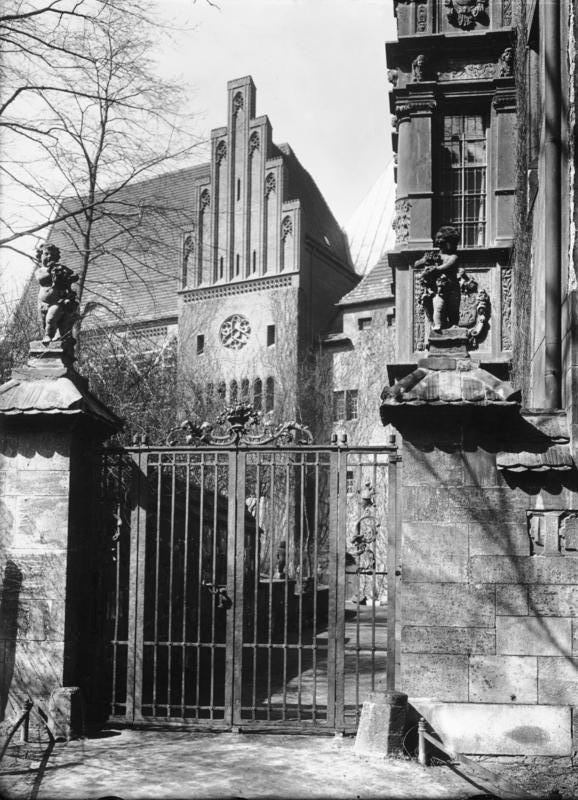
Rear gateway (1929)

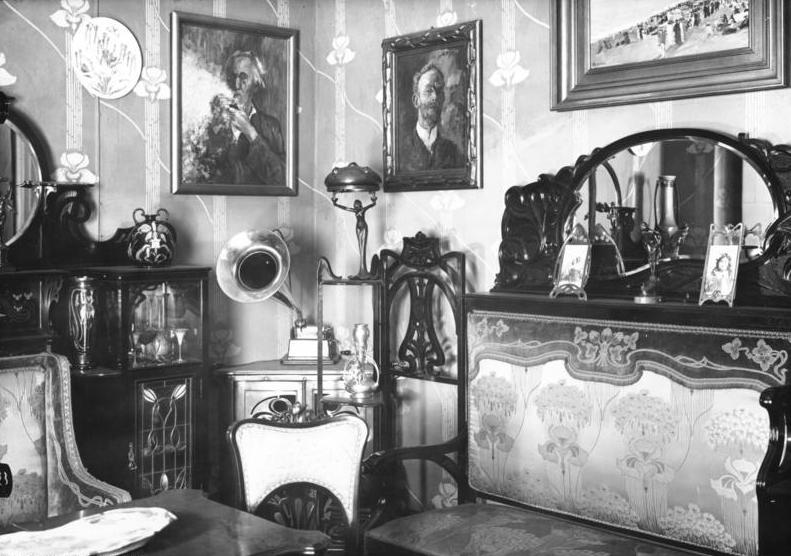
Jugendstil interior in the museum (1935)

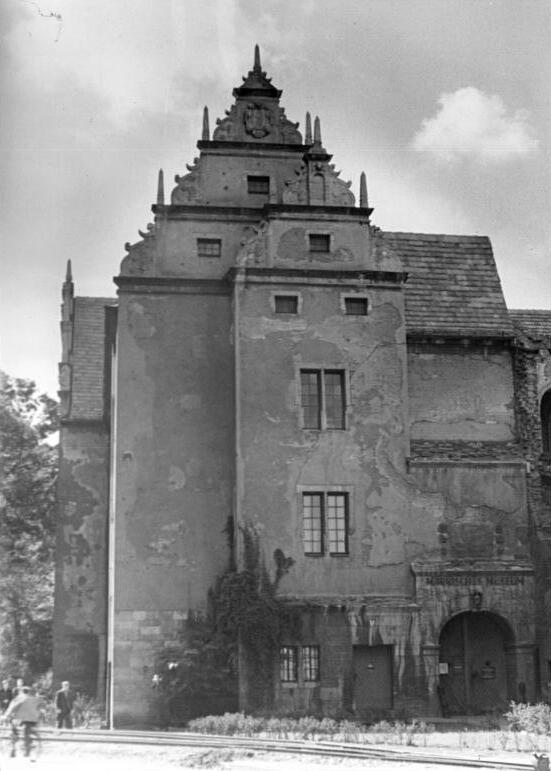
Remaining damage to the museum exterior (1952)

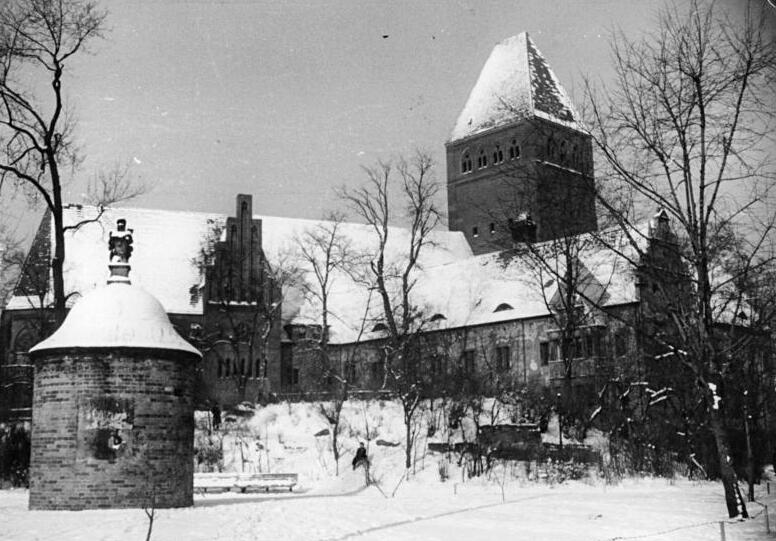
Winter view of the museum (1953)
