= Mc Group =

Public relations company

Media Consulta International Holding AG
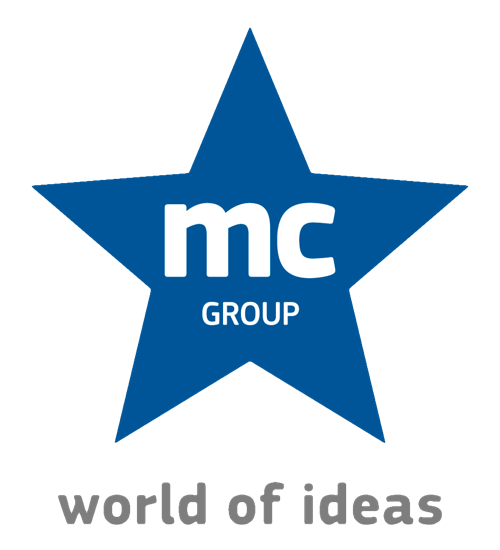

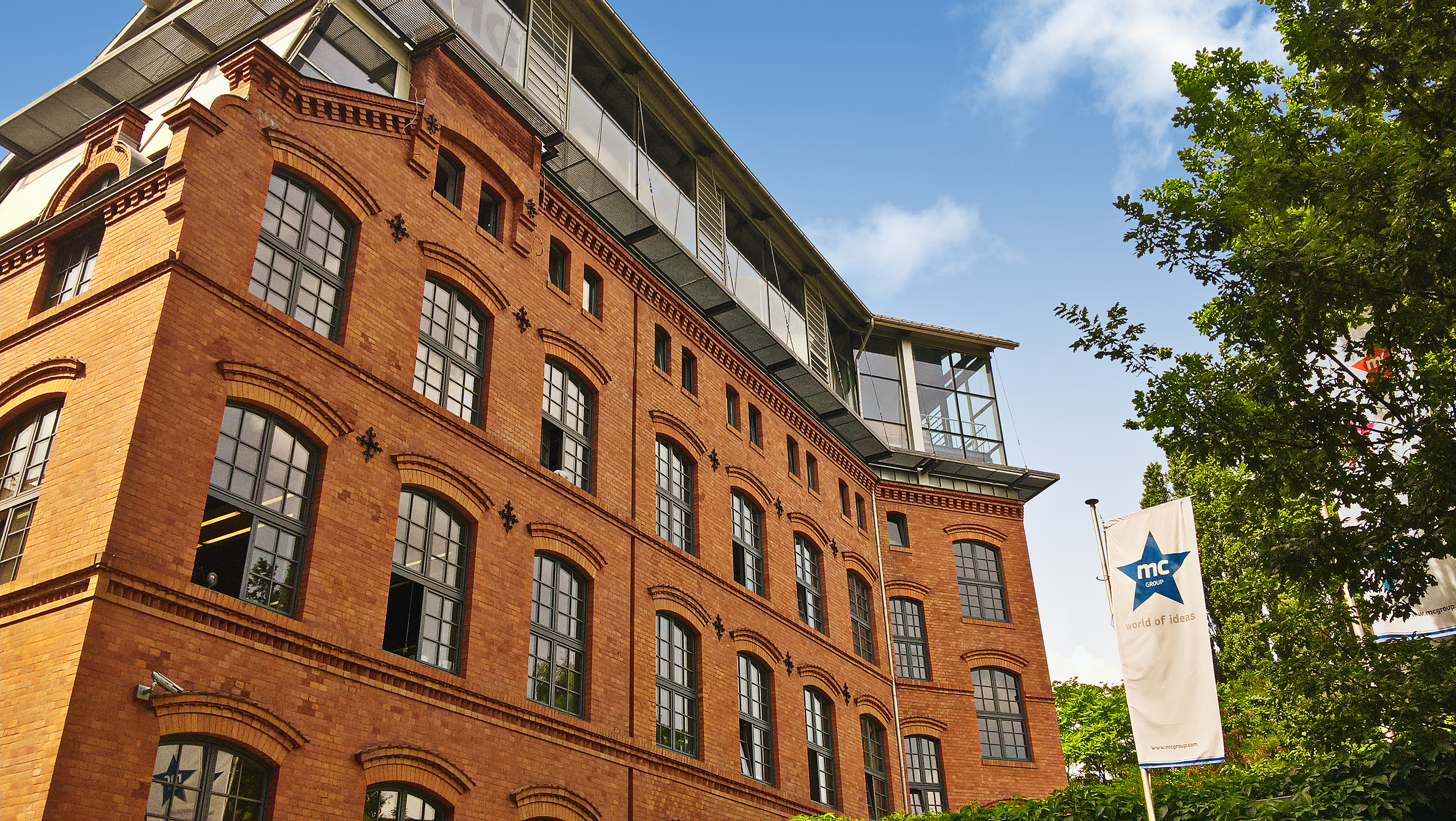
- Headquarters of the mc Group (2017)
- Company type: Private (Aktiengesellschaft)
- Industry: Public Relations, Advertising
- Founded: September 17, 1993; 32 years ago in Cologne, North Rhine-Westphalia, Germany
- Headquarters: Berlin, Germany
- Area served: Worldwide
- Key people: Harald Zulauf (Chief Executive Officer); Peter Holzaepfel (Chairman of the Supervisory Board)
- Revenue: ▲€497.7 million (2015)
- Divisions: mc PR; mc Advertising; mc Digital; mc Event; mc Corporate Publishing; mc TV & Filmproduction; mc Sport & Entertainment
- Website: www.mcgroup.com

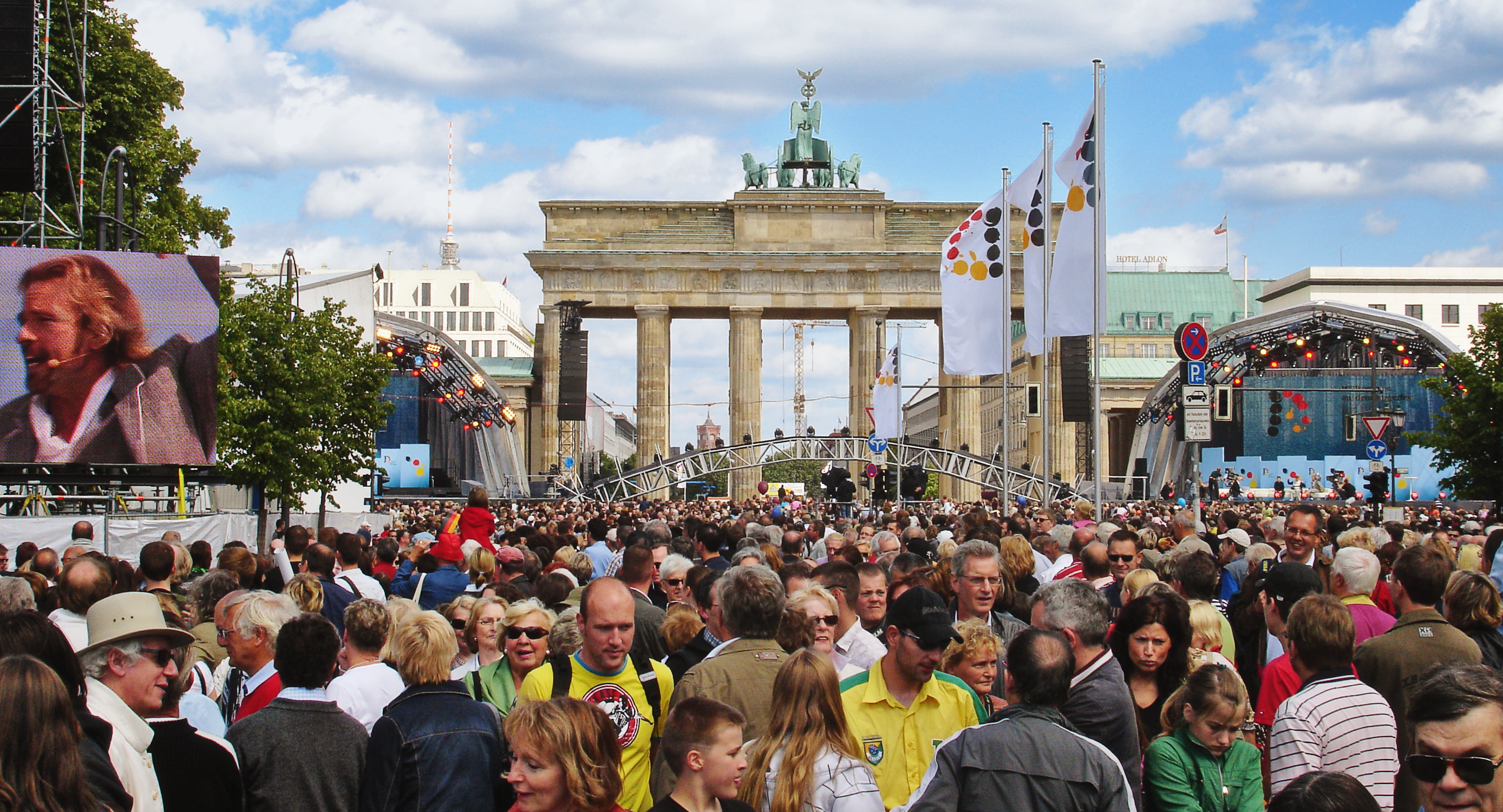
Festival on the occasion of the 60th anniversary of the ratification of the Basic Law for the Federal Republic of Germany, planned and implemented by the mc Group on behalf of the Federal Press Office (2009)

The mc Group (formerly Media Consulta) is an international public relations network and advertising agency. Established in 1993 in Cologne, Germany, the company has been headquartered in Berlin since the year 2000.

The mc Group is Germany's largest communication agency and the third-largest German advertising agency. It is one of the key players in the industry, currently ranking 13th worldwide, 2nd in Europe and 1st in the GCC/Middle East. The mc Group pursues an integrated communication approach, offering a comprehensive service portfolio in a variety of fields. The group of companies includes over 80 agencies on all continents. The mc Group is the only agency worldwide to be present in all 28 member states of the European Union. Clients come from the worlds of business (e.g. Generali, Lidl), media (e.g. RTL, CNN), politics (e.g. the European Union, the ASEAN, many national governments including Germany, Brazil, France or China) and sports clubs/associations (e.g. football, Formula 1, tennis, golf and the Olympic Games). In 2021, Mc Group was ranked 17th on the Global Top 250 PR Agency Ranking.

== History ==
=== Beginnings in sports and business ===
In 1993, Harald Zulauf established Media Consulta in Cologne after previously working as a journalist and a PR consultant. "Media Consulta Deutschland GmbH" was listed in the Commercial Register on September 17 of the same year. As sports became an increasingly vital sector for the advertising industry, sports marketing developed into a key area of focus for Media Consulta. Example of this include the communication management of major tennis tournaments, including the ATP World Tour, Davis Cup and Fed Cup as well as projects for Formula One. The company also placed electrical appliance manufacturer Braun in the global spotlight during the 1998 FIFA World Cup.

=== Campaigns for politics ===
By the end of the 1990s, Media Consulta had established itself as one of Germany's leading communication service providers, measured in terms of revenue. In 1998, the German Bundestag became Media Consulta's first political client. In 1999, Media Consulta signed a million-Euro campaign from the Brazilian Foreign Ministry and the United Nations to enhance the country's image in Germany. Political communication increasingly became the focus of the agency, along with public relations for large international companies and top industry associations. Following the move of the German Bundestag from Bonn to Berlin, Media Consulta established a base in Germany's capital. It set up its office in a historically-preserved former shoe factory at Köllnischer Park in Berlin's first and most central "Mitte" district, whilst at the same time continuing to expand its Cologne location.

=== Internationalization ===
After the turn of the millennium, "Media Consulta" became the "mc Group", expanded into other member states of the European Union and subsequently received dedicated budgets from the European Commission. For example, mc Group launched the "Feel Free to Say No" anti-smoking campaign for the Directorate-General for Health and Food Safety. In the years to follow, the group built a network of specialized agencies, including traditional advertising, film and television production, launching its first offices outside of the EU, in New York City and Moscow in 2005. Additional offices followed in Brazil, China and India. Reflecting the group's international focus, "Media Consulta International Holding AG" was established in 2006, which is as a holding company for the corporate group. In its home market Germany and Europe, the mc Group also enlisted additional key clients, e.g. the German Office of the Federal President and the Lidl discount supermarket chain in Germany and Spain.

=== Market leadership ===
By 2008, mc Group ranked among the leading service providers in the area of public relations on an international scale. For several years, the company was the second largest communication agency in Germany, after Ketchum Pleon. In 2011, mc Group overtook the competition for the first time and has successfully defended its market leadership to this day. On a European and global scale, mc Group became one of the key players in communication and advertising industry. The largest campaigns of recent years include communication for the "Deutschlandjahr 2013/2014" in Brazil, along with the international "Make it in Germany" campaign launched by the Federal Ministry of Economics and Labor. The mc Group was also involved in a project for the Berlin Brandenburg Airport.

== Structure ==
=== Legal and management ===
The corporate holding of the mc Group is "Media Consulta International Holding AG", involving a joint-stock company under German law. The purpose of the company, according to its statutes, is "international communication work for industry, media, politics and sports", along with all related business activities. The company is capitalized at some two million Euros. Whilst not all companies in the mc Group are included in the annual financial statements of the holding company, there is a VAT group with the holding.

The mc Group is represented by a management board composed of one or more people. Currently, Harald Zulauf is serving in this capacity. The supervisory board of the group is required to consist of at least three people and in the 2015 financial year, these were Ingo Frieske, Marcus Glasmacher and Peter Holzaepfel (Chairman).

=== Divisions and locations ===
Media Consulta International Holding consists of six divisions, or units. These are specialized expert agencies for public relations (mc PR), advertising (mc Advertising), digital communication (mc Digital), event marketing (mc Event), corporate publishing (mc Corporate Publishing), film production (mc TV & Filmproduction) and sports marketing (mc Sport & Entertainment). In addition to the subsidiaries operating under the mc Group banner, Maximum Media GmbH, Global Translate GmbH and Global Travel GmbH are three companies operating largely independently.

Since 2012, international business has been bundled in continental hubs, currently being seven locations, in Brussels, Dubai, Johannesburg, Moscow, New York City, São Paulo and Singapore. Worldwide, more than 80 agencies belong to the network of the mc Group.
