= Heinrich Zille =

German illustrator and caricaturist

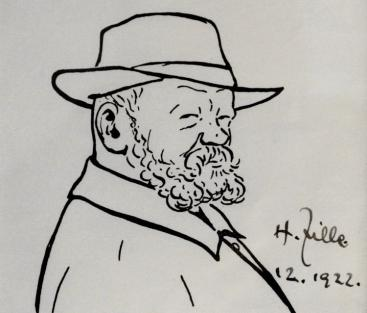
- Self-portrait 1922
- Born: Rudolf Heinrich Zille; 10 January 1858; Radeburg, Kingdom of Saxony
- Died: 9 August 1929 (aged 71); Berlin, Weimar Republic
- Occupations: Illustrator Photographer, Caricaturist

Rudolf Heinrich Zille (10 January 1858 – 9 August 1929) was a German illustrator, caricaturist, lithographer and photographer.

== Childhood and education ==
Zille was born in Radeburg near Dresden, son of watchmaker Johann Traugott Zill (Zille since 1854) and Ernestine Louise (born Heinitz, daughter of a miner from the Ore Mountains). His father had originally been a blacksmith, however, being technically skilled, had gone on to become a watchmaker, goldsmith and inventor of tools. Zille spent his early years in Potschappel. His childhood was not without trouble. His father was incarcerated several times in debtors' prison and creditors harassed the family so much that the young Zille was often sent to live with his grandmother. In 1867 the family left town because of their debts and moved to Berlin. While still in school, the young Zille began to take drawing lessons. The teacher was supportive, and during a discussion of his future career aspirations, encouraged Zille to become a lithographer. Zille's father wanted Heinrich to become a butcher, but Heinrich could not stand the sight of blood. After he finished school in 1872 he went to the draughtsman Fritz Hecht on Jakobstraße and started an apprenticeship as a lithographer.

== Career ==
In 1883, he married Hulda Frieske, with whom he had three children. She died in 1919.

Zille became best known for his (often funny) drawings, catching the characteristics of people, especially "stereotypes", mainly from Berlin and many of them published in the German weekly satirical newspaper Simplicissimus. He was the first to portray the desperate social environment of the Berlin Mietskasernen (literally "tenement barracks"), buildings packed with sometimes a dozen persons per room who fled from the rural regions to the expanding industrial metropolis during the Gründerzeit only to find even deeper poverty in the developing proletarian class.

His special talent was the scathingly humorous portrayal of what were in reality quite unfunny life conditions of handicapped beggars, tuberculous prostitutes, and menial labourers, and especially their children, making the best they could of life and resolutely refusing to give up.

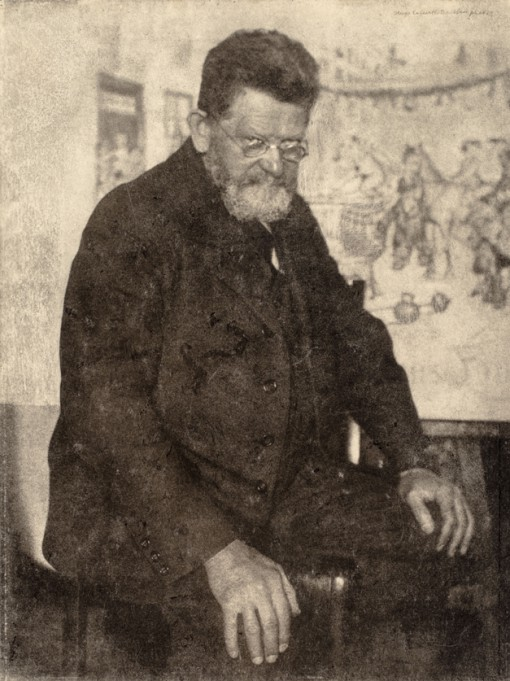
Portrait of Heinrich Zille by Hugo Erfurth, 1922

Zille did not consider himself a real artist: he often said that his work was not the result of talent but merely of hard work. Max Liebermann nevertheless promoted him. He called him into the Berlin Secession in 1903, featured his work in exhibitions, and encouraged him to sell drawings – and when Zille lost his job as a lithographer in 1910, he encouraged him to live from his drawings alone.

The Berlin "Common People" paid him the greatest respect, and very late in life his fame culminated when both poverty and freedom of expression reached new heights in the Roaring Twenties, with the National Gallery buying some drawings in 1921, the Academy of the Arts honouring him with a professorship in 1924, and Gerhard Lamprecht making the film Die Verrufenen based on his cartoon characters and stories in 1925. His 70th birthday in 1928 was celebrated throughout Berlin. He died one year later. He is buried at the Stahnsdorf South-Western Cemetery near Berlin.

== Legacy and honors ==
Heinrich Zille Park on Bergstraße in Berlin's Mitte borough was named for him by the City of Berlin in 1948 and formerly featured a statue of him from the workshop of Paul Kentsch, but the statue's whereabouts are unknown and the park is now a children's adventure playground. There is a Zille Memorial statue created in 1964–65 by Heinrich Drake in the Lapidary within Köllnischer Park, also in Mitte. An elementary school in Berlin's Friedrichshain district is named in his honor.

A museum dedicated to Zille's work opened in Berlin's Nikolaiviertel, in Mitte, in 2002; in 2007 a statue of him by Thorsten Stegmann was erected nearby.

It is less known that Zille produced many erotic pictures that are close to pornography but also show the life of normal people; some of them can be seen in the Beate Uhse Erotic Museum in Berlin.

In 1983 director Werner W. Wallroth made an East German film based on a musical written by Dieter Wardetzky and Peter Rabenalt. This movie, Zille und Ick (Zille and I in Berlin dialect), is not a real biopic but uses parts of Zille's life for the story.

A drawing by Zille appears on a German postage stamp of 55 Euro-Cents, with the caption "Heinrich Zille, 1858–1929".

Zille's grandniece is Helen Zille, the former mayor of Cape Town and Premier of the Western Cape province in South Africa.

== Gallery ==
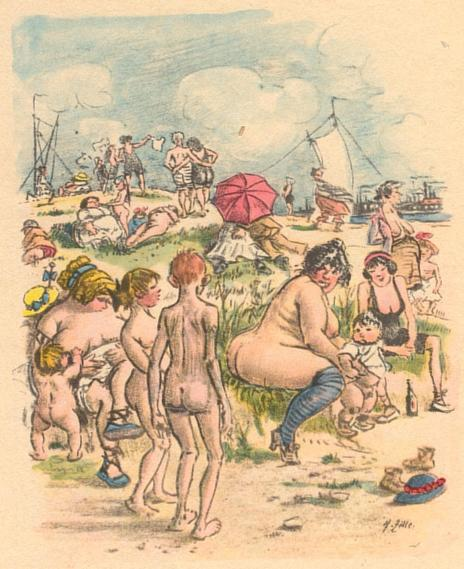

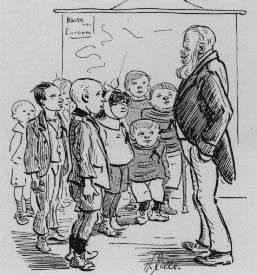
"School", by Zille

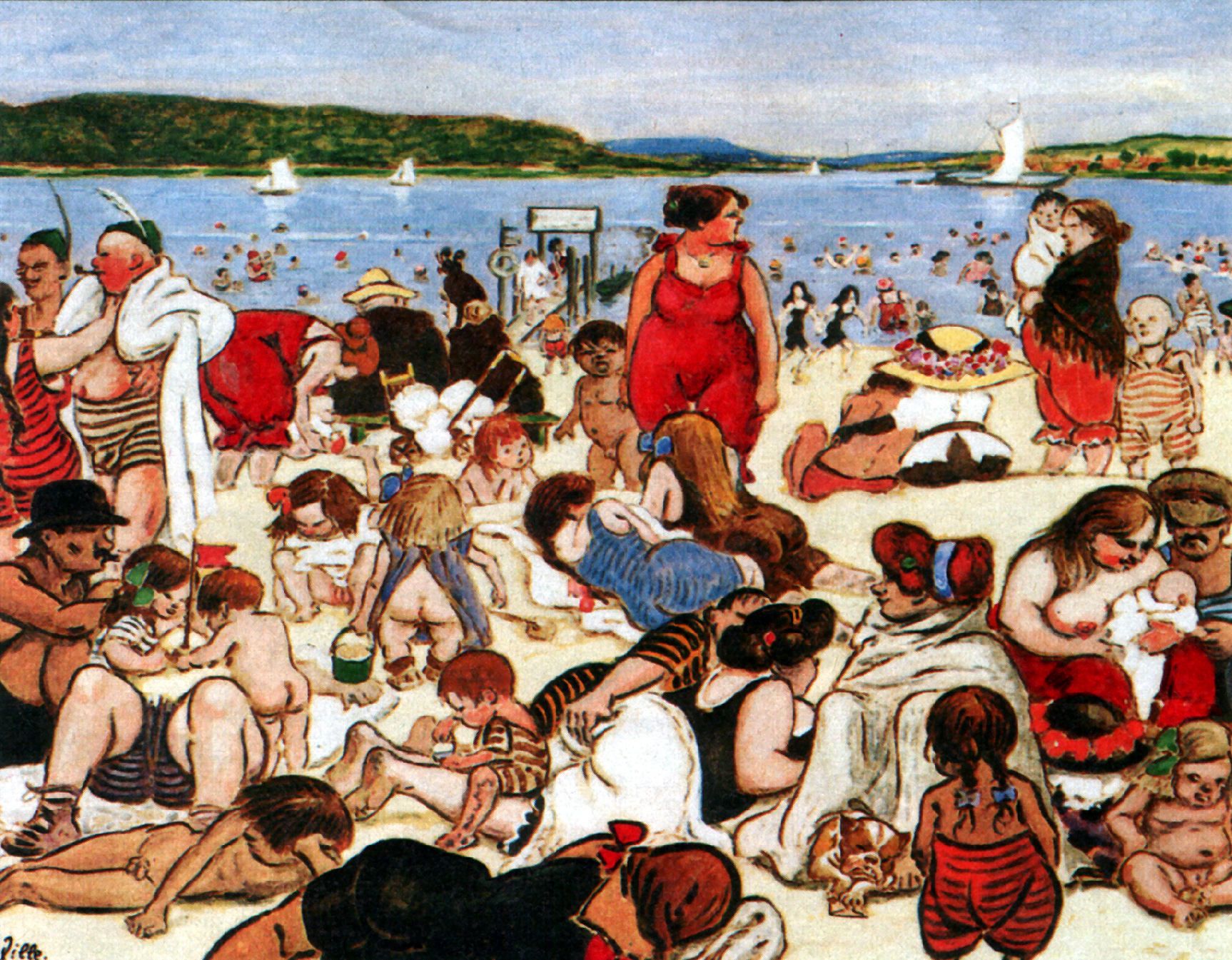
"Beach life in Berlin" (1901), by Zille

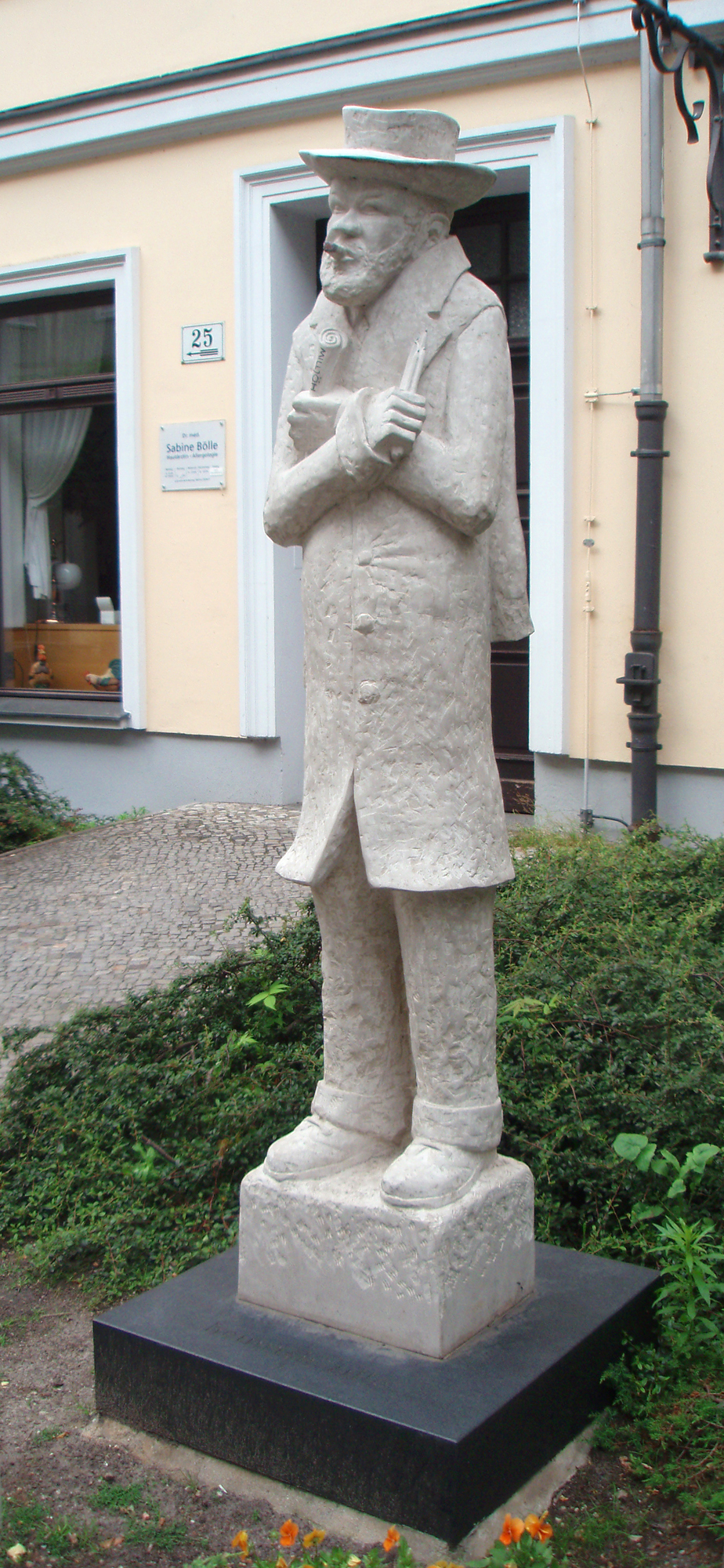
Monument to Zille by Thorsten Stegmann in the Nikolaiviertel

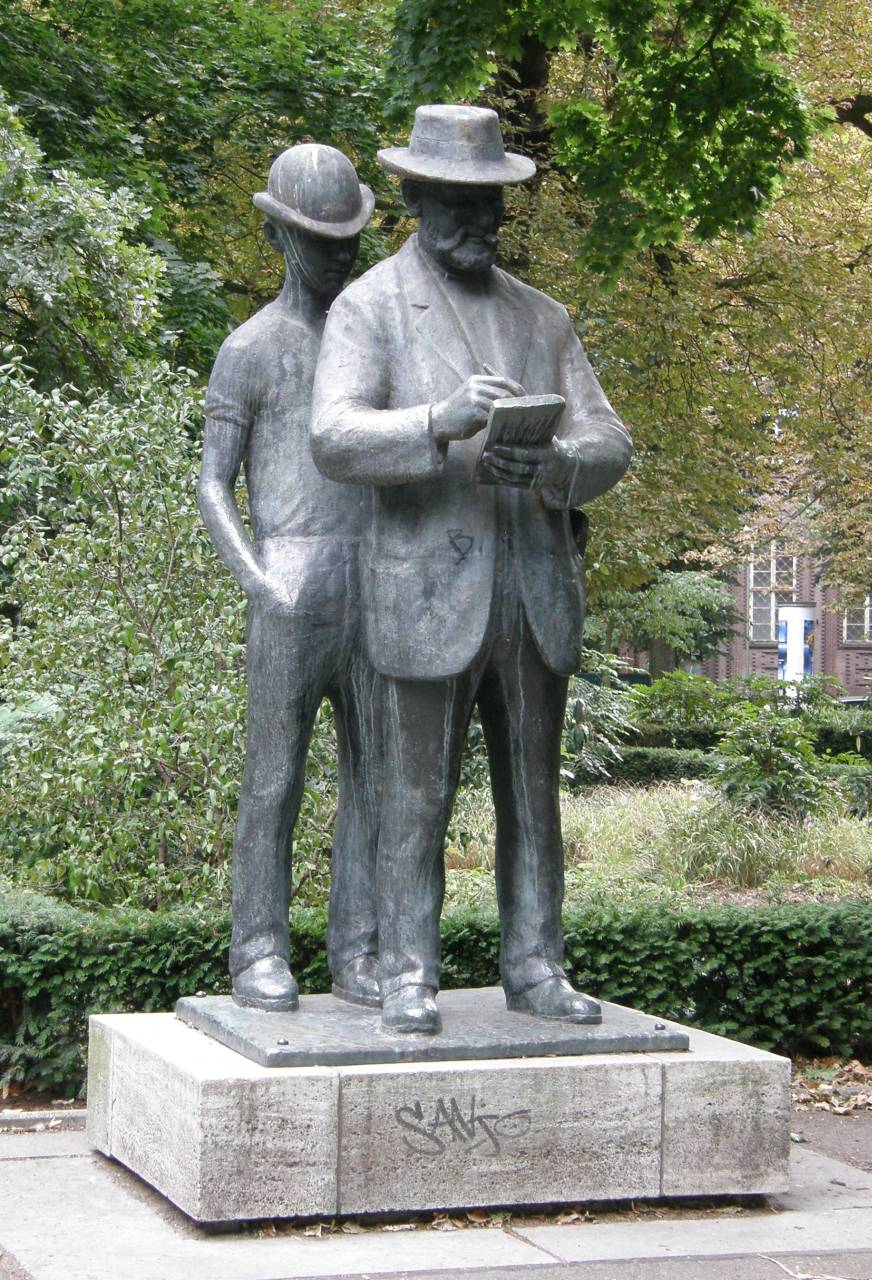
Zille Memorial in Köllnischer Park, Berlin, by Heinrich Drake

== Selected filmography ==
- Slums of Berlin (1925)
- The Ones Down There (1926)
- Big City Children (1929)
- Mother Krause's Journey to Happiness (1929)
