= Köllnischer Park =

Public park near the River Spree in Mitte, Berlin, Germany

Coordinates: 52°30′47″N 13°24′53″E

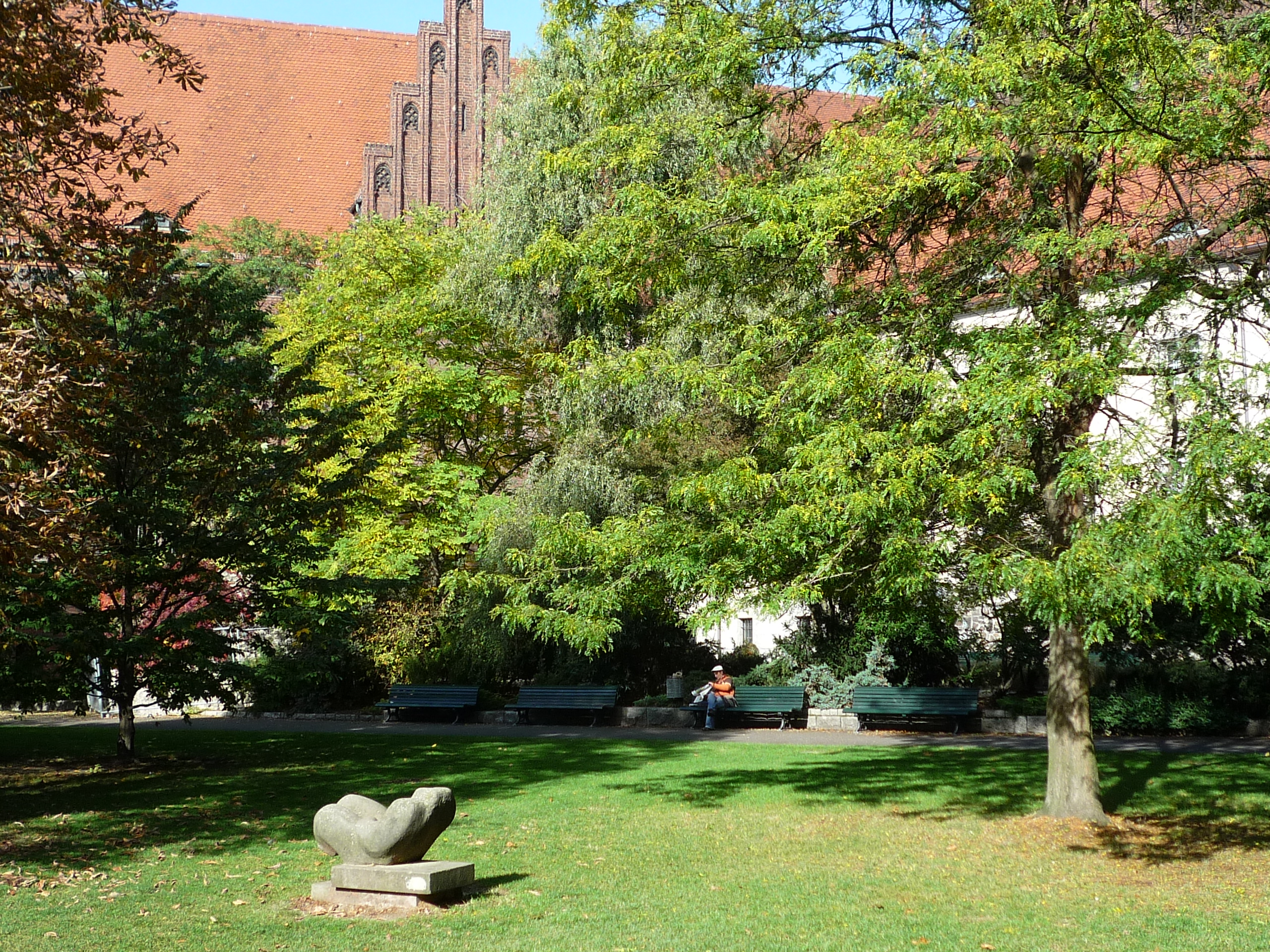
Part of Köllnischer Park; Märkisches Museum in background

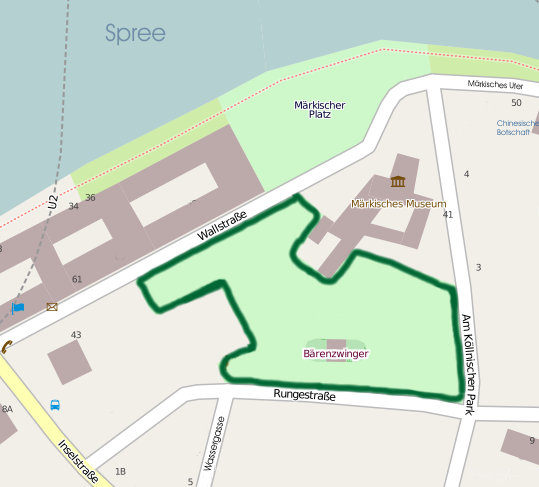
Location of Köllnischer Park in relation to streets and Märkisches Museum

Köllnischer Park is a public park located near the River Spree in Mitte, Berlin. It is named after Cölln, one of the two cities which came together to form Berlin; the park location was originally just outside it. Approximately 1 hectare (2.5 acres) in area, the park came into existence in the 18th and 19th centuries on the site of fortifications. It was redesigned as a public park in 1869–1873 and was further modified in the 20th century with the addition of first a bear enclosure, the Bärenzwinger, and later a permanent exhibition of sculpture, the Lapidary. The park is a registered Berlin landmark.

== Location and name ==
The park lies between Wallstraße on the north side, the Straße am Köllnischen Park on the east side, Rungestraße on the south side and Inselstraße on the west side. Its boundaries are not clearly delimited; on the west side there are some buildings between the park and the street, including the former building of the Köllnisches Gymnasium, built in 1865–68 and now used as a music school, and on the north side, facing the river, is the Märkisches Museum. The western edge is dominated by a large office building built in 1903/04 as the headquarters of the Landsversicherungsanstalt, which has been used for the past few years by the Department of Urban Development of the Senate of Berlin, and the southern by the 1931/32 building of the German health insurance group Allgemeine Ortskrankenkasse, which under the German Democratic Republic was the Parteihochschule Karl Marx.

The park is accessible via the Märkisches Museum U-Bahn station on line U2 and bus number 147. It is also close to the promenade which has been created along the bank of the Spree south of the Jannowitzbrücke.

== History ==
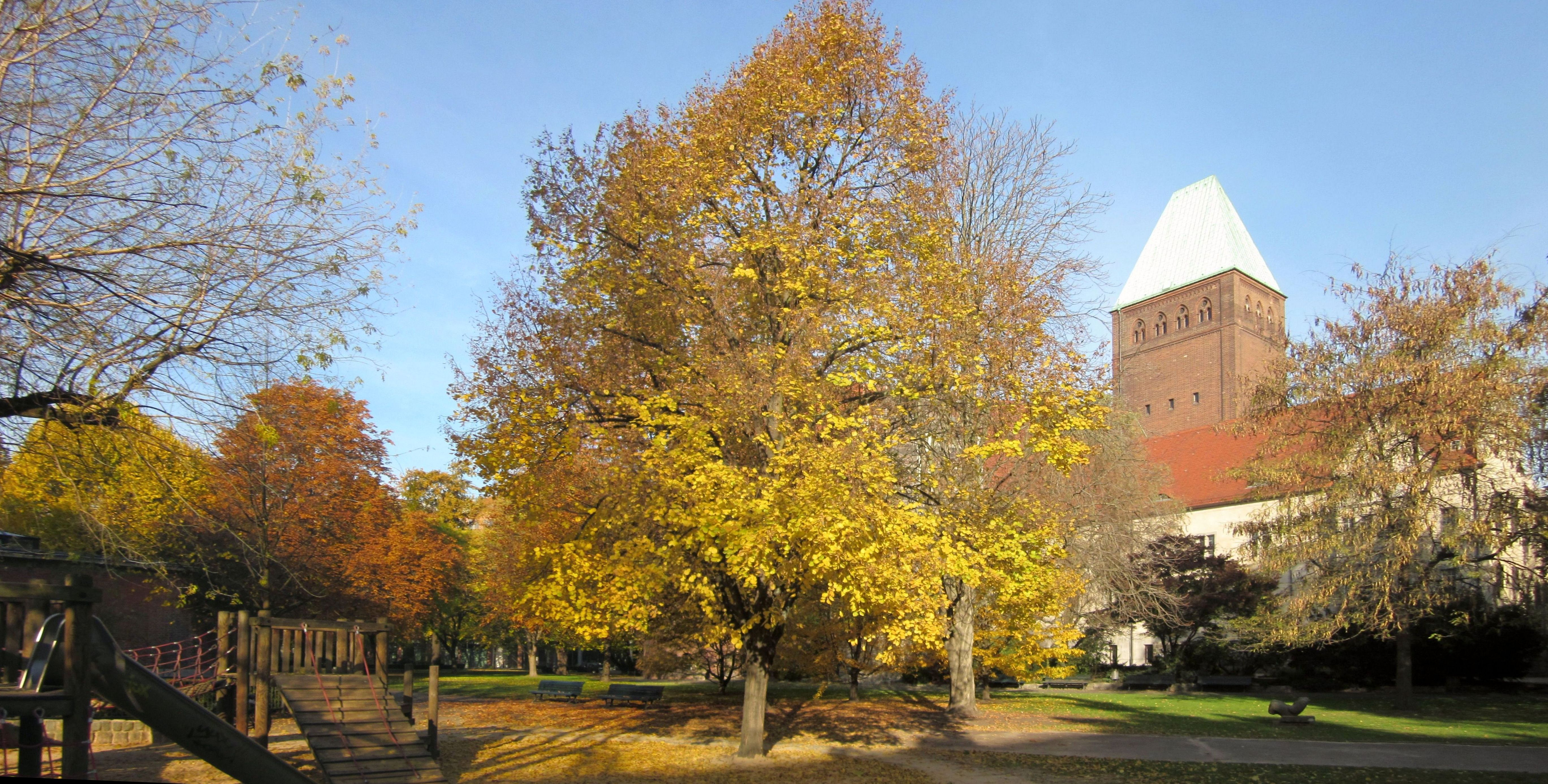
View of Köllnischer Park, Märkisches Museum in the background

The site of Köllnischer Park was just outside Cölln in the Middle Ages. Until the mid-17th century, it was undeveloped low-lying, swampy land prone to flooding by the Spree. Following the decision by Frederick William, the 'Great Elector' to encircle Berlin with fortifications, this became the location of Bastion VII, which was known at the time as "the bulwerk in the morass'. The work required the creation of large embankments and lasted until 1683; the swampland around the bastion was not fully drained until 1687. After such lengthy construction, the works were already out of date militarily, and after 1700 served only to control the comings and goings of visitors and residents, prevent desertion, and enable the collection of tolls on those entering the city. By 1700, mulberry trees had been planted on the walls, but only 'persons of rank' were permitted to promenade along them. After Berlin had grown considerably and the Customs Wall had been built around it, King Frederick William I (1688–1740) ordered the defensive walls to be demolished. Civilian buildings had already grown up on the bastions; a windmill and a house for the miller were built on Bastion VII, and these caused the eastern portion to be left standing longer than other parts of the fortifications. Some of the rubble from the demolished fortifications was used to build up Wilhelmstraße; the rest was thrown into the defensive ditch outside the walls.

In 1736, Frederick William I gave the site of the park and the Märkisches Museum to one of his generals, Friedrich Sebastian Winnibald Truchseß, Count of Waldburg, who built a house there and laid out an extensive garden. After his death in the Battle of Hohenfriedberg, David Splitgerber, a merchant and banker, bought the land and was given the remaining eastern bastion section; from 1750 onwards, he operated Berlin's first sugar processing plant on the site, and also enlarged and improved the garden. In 1779, the baroque garden was mentioned by the bookseller and author Friedrich Nicolai: "It has very charming areas, in particular it includes an open pavilion on a rise, which is small, but has tall trees growing upon it". The sugar plant was forced to close in 1788. The buildings on the site were then used succeeding as tobacco storage, a hospital, a workhouse, and a men's lunatic asylum. The Märkisches Museum was later built there. Splitgerber's heirs sold the garden and in 1799 it was acquired by a Freemason lodge, the Große National-Mutterloge zu den drei Weltkugeln (Grand National Mother Lodge of the Three Globes). The Freemasons built a lodge building which opened in December 1800, and developed the remainder into a landscape garden, one of the most attractive gardens in Berlin.

In 1858/59 Inselstraße was extended through the garden to connect Köpenicker Straße to the city centre, and the Lodge was forced to sell the larger, eastern portion of the site to the city. The Köllnisches Gymnasium was then built there. How to use the remainder of the site was discussed for years; a desire to preserve the trees led to the rejection of several commercial proposals. On 15 April 1869, the Assembly of City Deputies (Stadtverordnetenversammlung) decided to establish a public playground (probably one of the first in the city) and 'promenade location' there on plans drawn up by the first city director of gardens, Gustav Meyer, dedicated the necessary funds, and urged rapid execution of the plan. The plan involved some new plantings, fencing, and benches. This renovation was completed in 1873. The park reached its current dimensions in 1883 after the ditch was filled in. Ludwig Hoffmann, the architect of the Märkisches Museum (completed in 1907), then made some changes, including creating views across the park to the new museum. The last major modification of the park took place in 1969–71 to designs by Eberhard Jaenisch, Stefan Rauner and Roswitha Schulz: a mound which remained on the site of the bastion was levelled, a children's playground was added, a terrace was built behind the museum, and the Lapidary was created.

== Attractions ==
=== Lapidary ===
The Lapidary is an open-air museum of primarily stone artworks, both originals and copies, which formerly decorated buildings that no longer exist. Some are set into the walls around a 1969 terrace, while others are freestanding at various locations in the park. For example, in the walls of the terrace there are fragments of five carved heads from the keystones over windows, supposed to be from the Old City Hall of Berlin in Spandauer Straße and attributed to Georg Gottfried Weiyhenmeyer; two allegorical reliefs; 17th- and 18th-century building signs; a late Gothic vault keystone; and a 16th-century sandstone relief from the Stadtschloß.

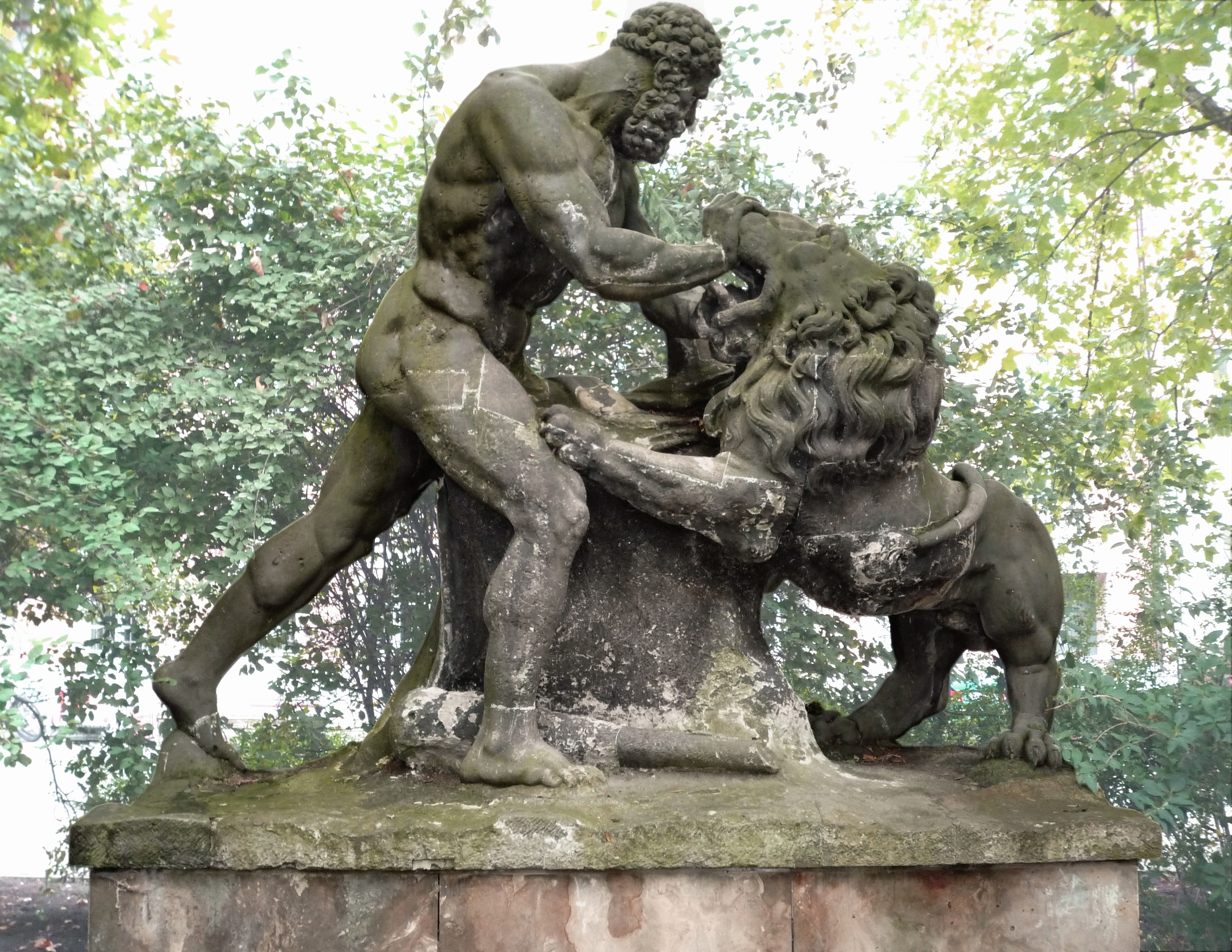
Hercules Fighting the Nemeian Lion, by Gottfried Schadow

The freestanding sculptures include, among others:

- a larger-than-life sandstone sculpture of Hercules fighting the Nemean Lion, at the eastern entrance to the park, was modelled in 1787 by Gottfried Schadow and executed in 1791 by Conrad Nicolas Boy. The work originally decorated a bridge over the Königsgraben, was moved in 1891 to the Herkulesbrücke (Hercules Bridge) over the Landwehr Canal. It was placed in storage in 1934 before being installed in the park in 1971.
- two groups of putti, also in sandstone, from the balustrade of the New Palace in Potsdam.
- a mid-19th-century terracotta fountain in Italian Renaissance style from the garden of a villa in the Hirschgarten section of Friedrichshagen
- an oversize sandstone vase with bulls' head handles created after a classical model by an artist in the school of Friedrich Christian Glume (1714–1752) for the attic course of the colonnades at Sanssouci.

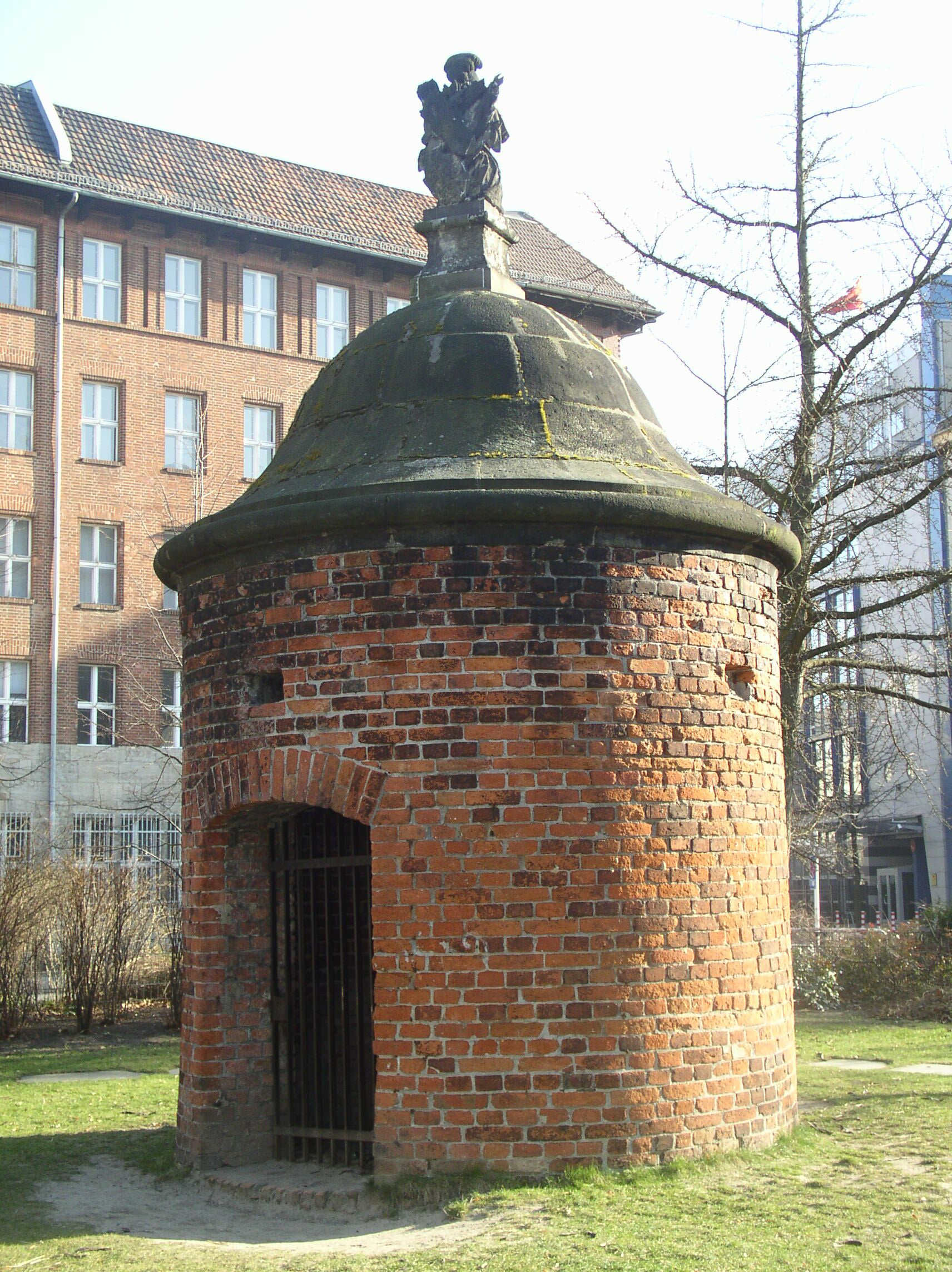
Wusterhausener Bär, a small round tower with tiled walls

=== Zille Memorial and Neo-Renaissance Fountain ===
Modern and thus atypical of the sculptures in the park is the bronze statue of the artist Heinrich Zille, which was created in 1964–65 by Heinrich Drake for an exhibition in the Treptower Park and afterwards moved to Köllnischer Park. It is listed as a landmark by the City of Berlin.

At the Rungestraße corner of the park there is a historic fountain from a private garden in Hirschgarten. Moved to the park in 1971, it was made in about 1860 and is known as the Neo-Renaissance Fountain. It is currently enclosed for repairs.

=== Wusterhausener Bär ===
The Wusterhausener Bär (or Wusterhausischer Bär) is a small round tower, with tiled walls and a helmet-shaped sandstone cupola topped with a carved trophy display of weaponry, which was formerly part of a weir regulating the water level in the ditch that formed part of the wall defences. Bär in this case derives from the Latin berum, meaning "weir", and it was apparently named for Wusterhausen because the road to that town passed by its original location at Bastion VII. It was moved to the park in 1893 and is now incorporated into the Lapidary. It is listed as a Berlin landmark.

== Buildings ==
=== Märkisches Museum ===
The Märkisches Museum was built between 1901 and 1907. It was designed by Ludwig Hoffmann as a complex of buildings representing architecture of the Mark Brandenburg and North Germany in general in the Romanesque, Gothic, and Renaissance periods.

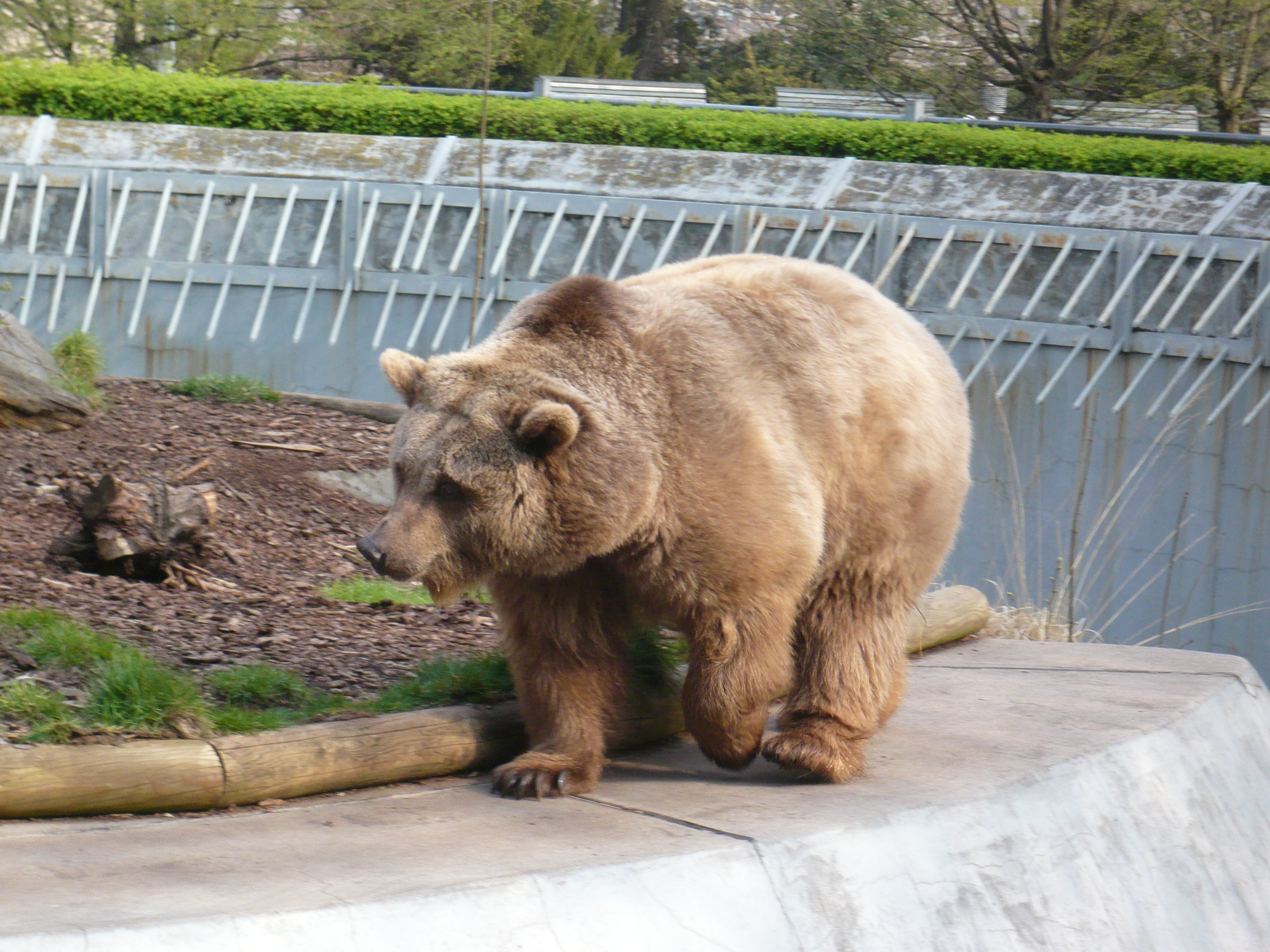
One of the Berlin bears in the Bärenzwinger

=== Bärenzwinger ===
Next to the south entrance to the park is the Bärenzwinger (bear pit). This was built in 1938–39 on the site of a former sanitation depot, also designed by Ludwig Hoffmann and already decorated with more than 50 plaques by Otto Lessing depicting bears. It consists of indoor sleeping quarters and outdoor exercise areas which have held as many as five bears (the armorial animal of Berlin) who are the official bears or mascots of the city. The impetus for building the Bärenzwinger was a letter to the newspaper Berliner Zeitung am Mittag (now B.Z.) from Wilfried Bade which appeared the day after the end of the celebration of the city's 700-year anniversary. The Lord Mayor, Julius Lippert, saw to its completion despite objections from some Nazi functionaries that there were more important things to be done in what proved to be the run-up to World War II. Two of the original bears were gifts from Bern, which also has a bear on its arms. It remains largely unchanged, although it had to be reconstructed after the war; it reopened in 1949 with two new bears, again from Bern; one of these, Jente, produced 33 cubs (including 4 sets of triplets and 9 pairs of twins) before being retired to the zoo. The last official city bear, Schnute, lived there until her death in 2015; her daughter Maxi also lived there until her death in August 2013. The Bärenzwinger is a listed Berlin landmark. It was threatened with closure in 1990 due to lack of funds for needed modernisation, but after public protest, the Berlin Senate funded the project. Underfloor heating in the cages and a skylight dome were added, and the electricity supply was overhauled. The facility reopened in 1993 and celebrated its 70th anniversary in 2009. Some animal protection advocates, including the city's own animal protection officer, have called for it to be closed as old-fashioned and inhumane.

=== Landesversicherungsanstalt building ===
East of the park at Am Köllnischen Park 3 is a large office building which was designed by Alfred Messel as the headquarters of the Landesversicherungsanstalt Berlin, the social insurance for Berlin within Bismarck's old age and disability insurance system. Built in 1903/04, the building echoes the Märkisches Museum, which was built at the same time, in the use of red brick on its façade and is in Expressionist-Baroque style, with giant pilasters which rise uninterrupted from the street to the roofline, between which are limestone decorative elements in the form of similated balustrades, allegorical figures, and cartouches with craft symbols, such as an iron between pairs of scissors. Over the southern entrance is a sculpture of a group of men in classical style with the motto "Einer für alle—alle für einen" (One for all—all for one). The building originally had a tower, which was destroyed in World War II. After the war, it was the headquarters of the East German Social Security Administration. It now houses offices of the Berlin Senate Department of Urban Development, and one of the courtyards has been roofed over and houses a permanent exhibition of plans for the redevelopment of the city. It forms part of an ensemble of buildings to either side of the Märkisches Museum which are registered as a city landmark.

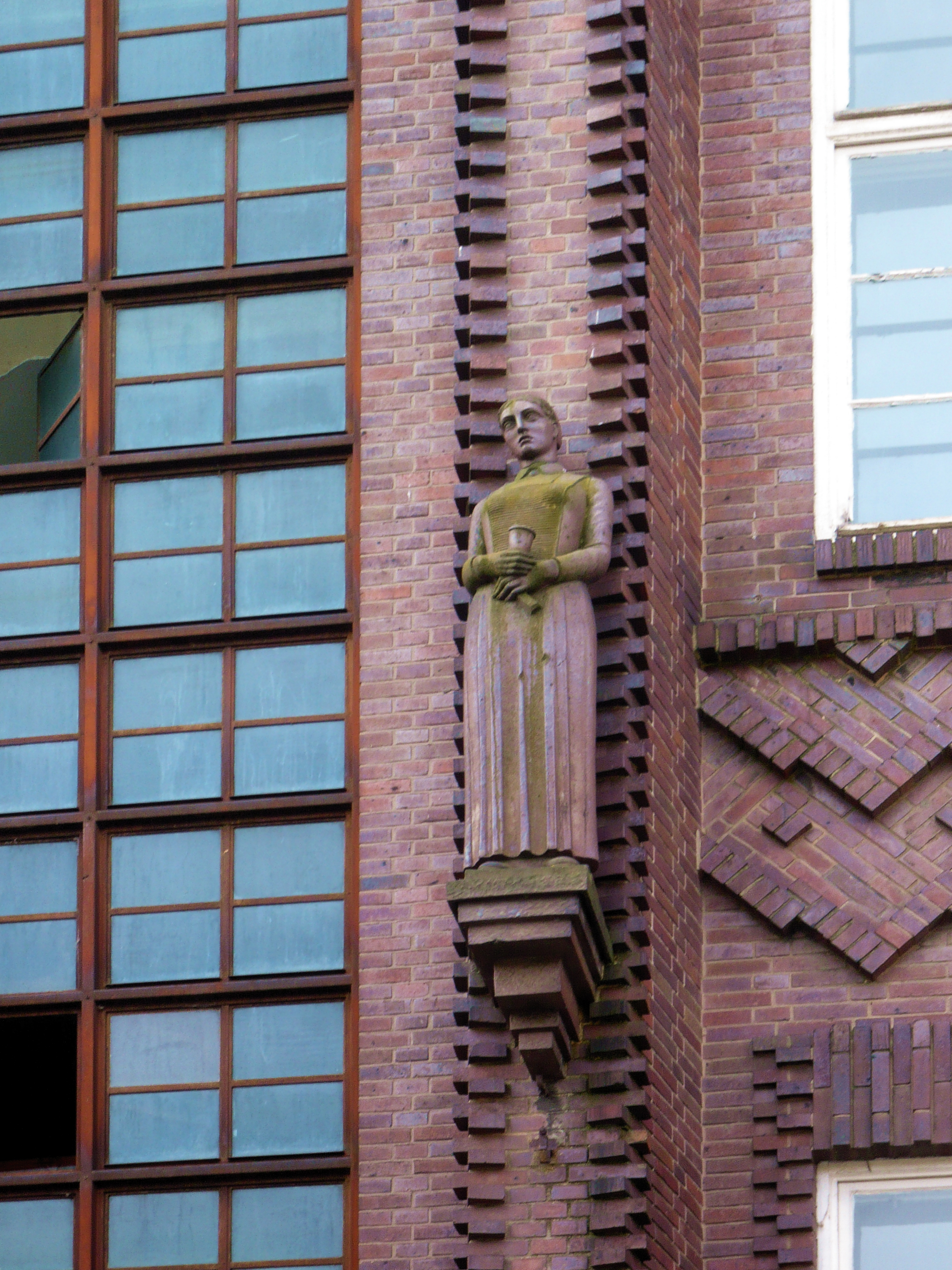
Detail of façade of AOK building

=== AOK building ===
The 6-storey steel-framed office building in purplish brick on the south side of the park at Rungestraße 3–6 and 7, opposite the Bärenzwinger, was designed by Albert Gottheiner (his last work before he was forced to leave Berlin) and built in 1931–32 as the headquarters of the Berlin affiliate of the Allgemeine Ortskrankenkasse (AOK) insurance group. The façade is "an outstanding example of late Expressionist architecture", featuring decorative brickwork and pillars, of which the six on the flanking staircase sections are emphasised by terracotta statues. Under the German Democratic Republic, the building housed the Party Academy of the governing Socialist Unity Party from 1955 onwards; a modern extension was built in the mid-1970s, designed by an architectural team led by Friedrich Kalusche. During this period, the building was renamed the Haus am Köllnischen Park. In summer 1990, after German reunification, the institution closed and the building reverted to the possession of the AOK. As of 2007, it houses their legal division. It is a registered city landmark.

=== Volksbadeanstalt ===
On the western side of the park is the Volksbadeanstalt, which was designed by Ende und Böckmann and built in 1888 as a public bath. The Berliner Verein für Volksbäder erected it and another in the Gartenstraße with assistance from the city, for the purpose of "enabling the less prosperous inhabitants of Berlin to receive the benefit of a warm bath in every season of the year, at the most economical price conceivable". The buildings had an "English-industrial" appearance and were horizontally organised with a taller central section giving an impression of "importance, balance and pragmatism" and ornamented with round arches over doors and windows and an acorn motif.

== Historical views in and around the park ==
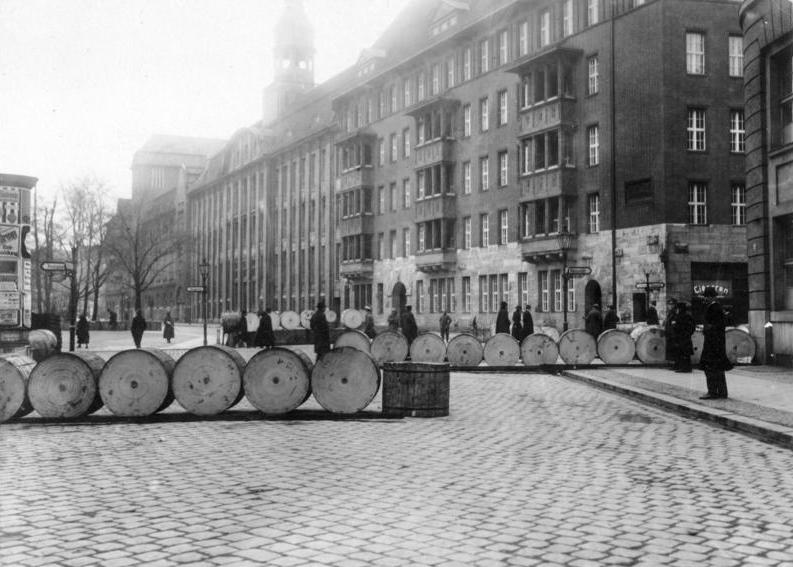
Street barricades during the 1918 November revolution; in the background Landesversicherungsanstalt building, with its now destroyed tower

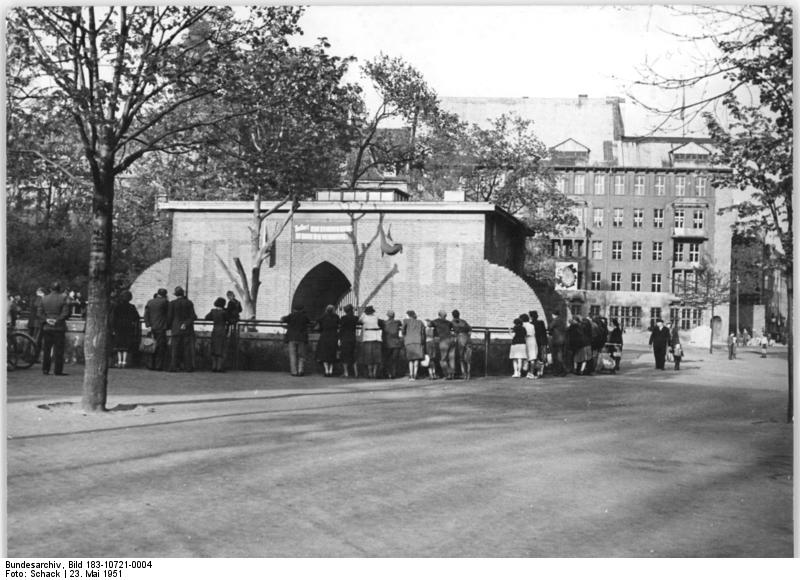
Visiting the Bärenzwinger in 1951

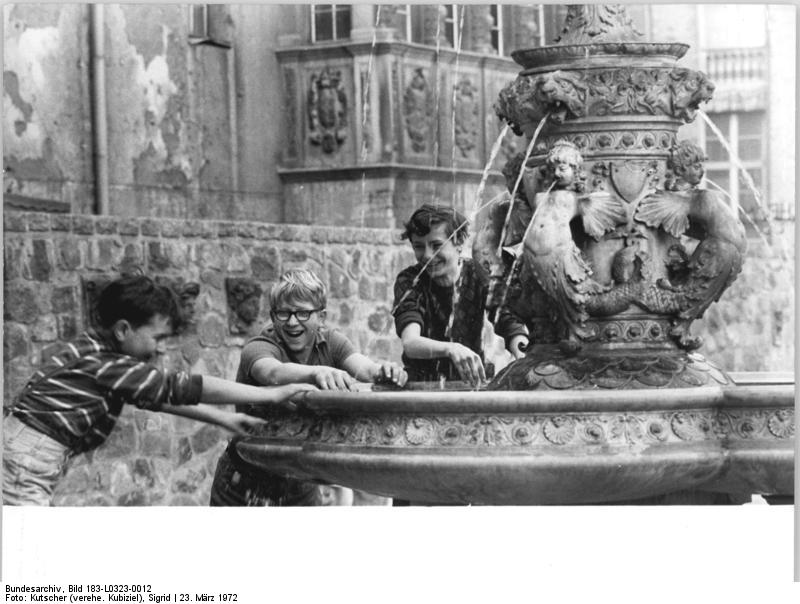
Playing at the fountain in 1972

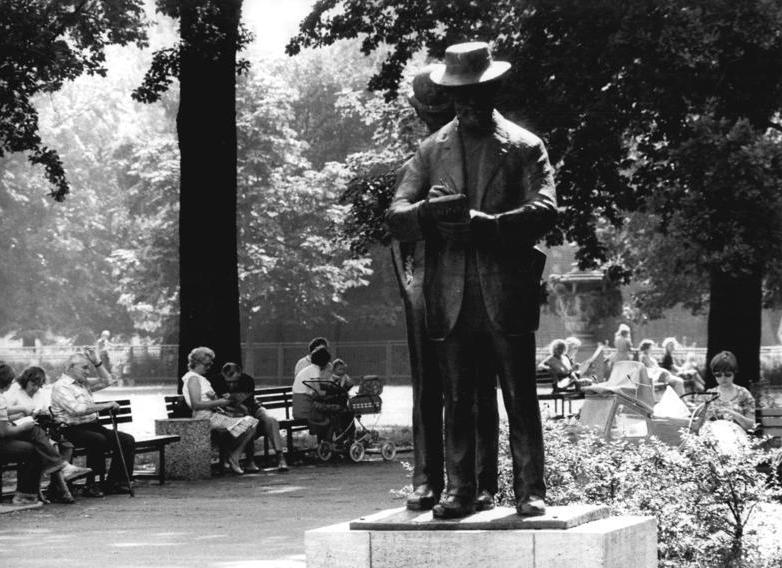
Scene at the Zille Memorial in 1979
