= 2010 Air Service Berlin Douglas C-47 crash =

Aviation accident

Coordinates: 52°31′12″N 13°24′18″E

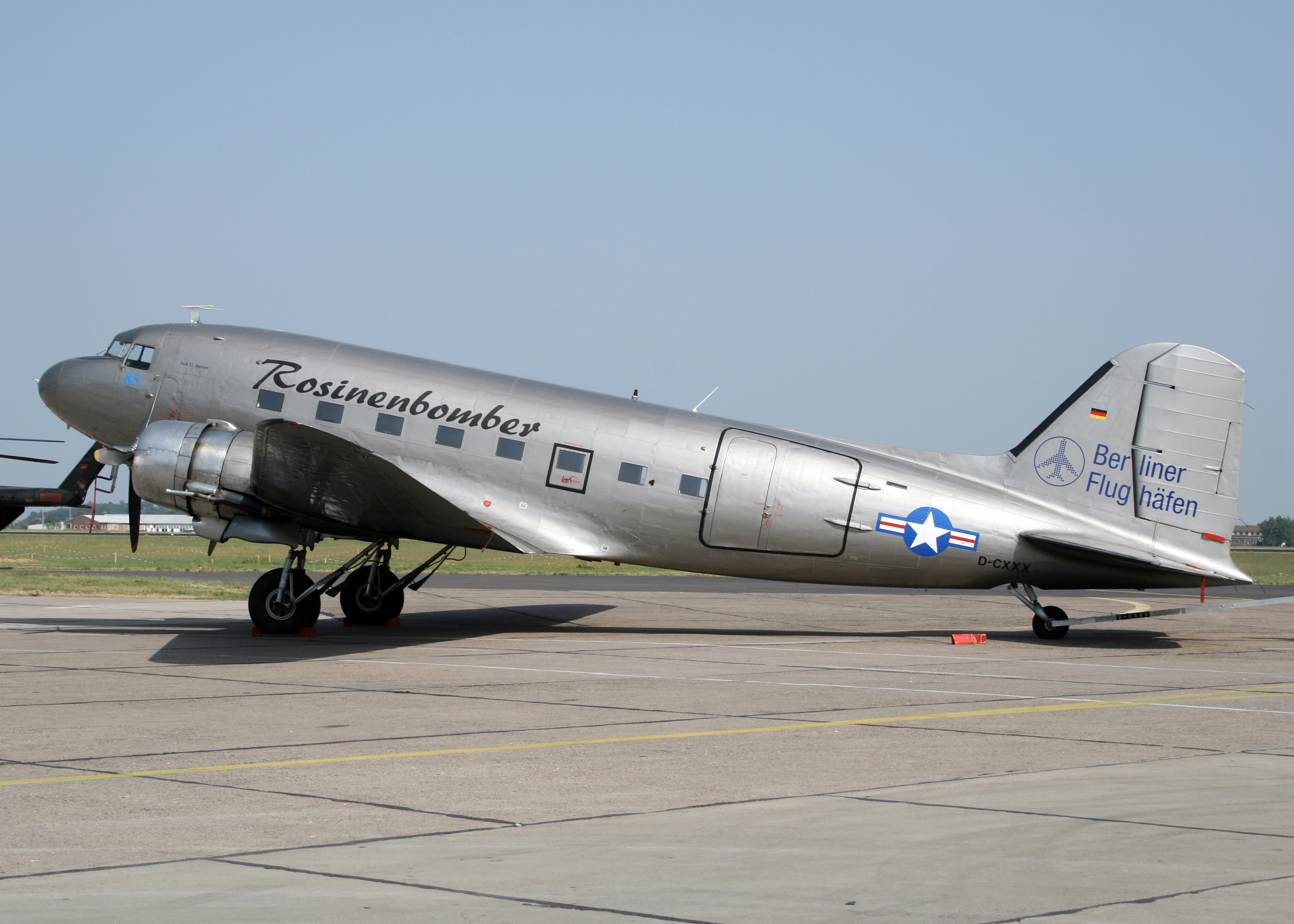
- D-CXXX, the aircraft involved

Accident
- Date: 19 June 2010
- Summary: Engine failure
- Site: Near Berlin Schönefeld Airport

Aircraft
- Aircraft type: Douglas C-47 Skytrain
- Aircraft name: Rosinenbomber
- Operator: Air Service Berlin
- Registration: D-CXXX
- Flight origin: Berlin Schönefeld Airport, Berlin, Germany
- Destination: Berlin Schönefeld Airport
- Occupants: 28
- Passengers: 25
- Crew: 3
- Fatalities: 0
- Injuries: 7
- Survivors: 28

On 19 June 2010, a vintage Douglas C-47 Skytrain aircraft crashed shortly after take-off from Berlin Schönefeld Airport for a sightseeing flight over Berlin, which was operated by Air Service Berlin, a provider of event flights. There were no fatalities, but 7 of the 28 passengers and crew were injured.

== Aircraft ==
The aircraft involved was a Douglas C-47 Skytrain (registered D-CXXX, serial number 16124/32872), a preserved Raisin bomber. It had been built in 1944 and was powered by two Pratt & Whitney R-1830-92 engines. It had participated in the 1948–49 Berlin Airlift. The importance of the airlift for Berlin led to it being acquired for sightseeing flights in 2000. The aircraft was one of the last two aircraft to take off from Berlin Tempelhof Airport (one of the Airlift airports) when it was closed on 30 October 2008.

== Accident ==
At around 15:00 local time, shortly after take-off from Berlin Schönefeld Airport for a sightseeing flight over the city centre of Berlin, the left engine failed and the aircraft was unable to gain height. The pilots went into a left turn and set down the aircraft into a field near the construction site for the new Berlin-Brandenburg International Airport. Three crew members and 25 passengers were on board (among them Stefan Kaufmann, a Bundestag member), all of whom were able to leave the aircraft unassisted. Seven people were injured, four of whom were taken to hospital. Schönefeld Airport was closed for fifteen minutes while its emergency services attended the crash scene. A fire that arose from spilled fuel was put out by the airport's firefighters.

== Aftermath ==
The C-47 aircraft suffered substantial damage to its tail and port wing. Nevertheless, due to its historic significance (and because it was the signature airframe of the company), Air Service Berlin stated it intended a complete repair and restoration. Donations towards the cost of the restoration had been received from across the world, including a symbolic 100 USD from Gail Halvorsen, the pilot who is attributed to having started the dropping of sweets for children from aircraft participating in the Berlin Airlift. The damaged port wing was later salvaged and sold as limited edition Aviationtags.
