= Hamburg Airlines =

German regional airline (1988–1997)

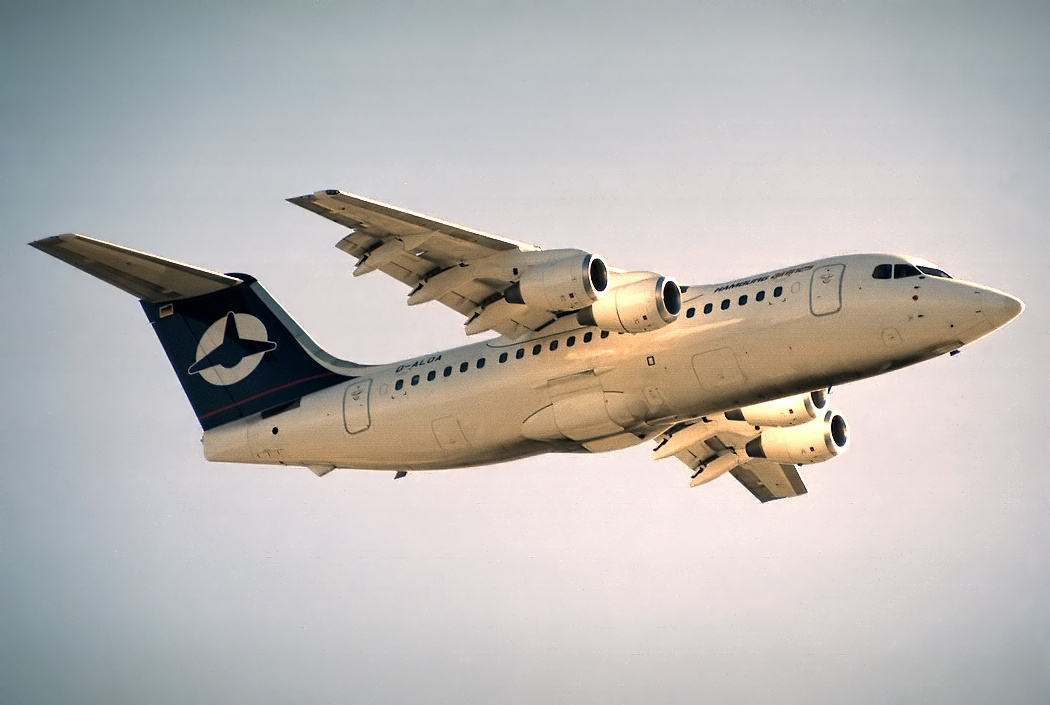
- BAe 146-200
IATA	ICAO	Call sign
HX	HAS	Hamburg Air
- Founded: 15 April 1988
- Commenced operations: 1988
- Ceased operations: 21 December 1997
- Parent company: Saarland Airlines (1991-1993)
- Headquarters: Hamburg, Germany
- Employees: 180

Hamburg Airlines was a small German regional airline established in 1988 and owned by entrepreneur Eugene Block. The company was dissolved after it went bankrupt and halted operations on 21 December 1997.

== History ==
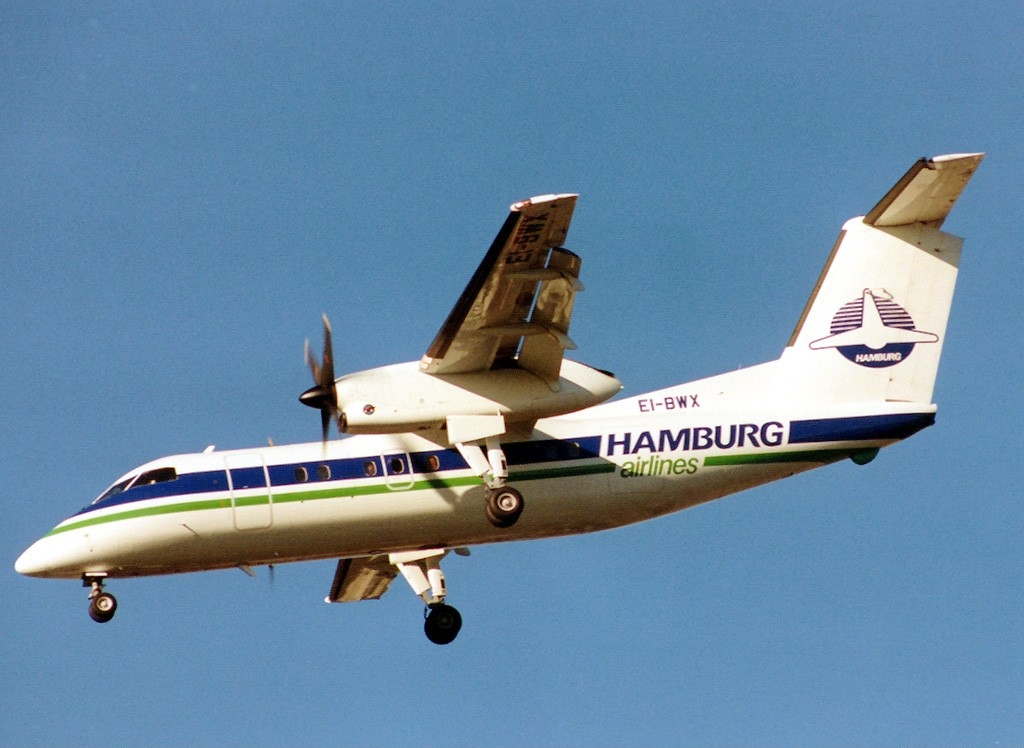
De Havilland Canada DHC-8-102

Hamburg Airlines GmbH & Co. K.G. was founded on 15 April 1988 and commenced operations on 8 June with a Dornier 228 with services between its hub of Hamburg and Rotterdam, and seasonally Westerland. This short interval can be explained by the fact that the air carrier was a partial re-edition of Holiday Express (Hanse Express) of which some employees were recovered. A couple of months later a second Dornier 228 was added and services expanded to Antwerp and Gothenburg. In October a de Havilland Canada Dash 8 was added, and the airline expanded operations. Five more from the 100 and 300 series would be added within a couple of years. From August 1990 a leased Fokker 100 was used on the Hamburg-London Gatwick connection, which was interrupted in January 1991 due to low customer demand. Instead the Fokker jetliner was instrumental to open charter flights to Spain. Thanks to the increase in the fleet it was possible to better structure the charter activities with particular reference to Edinburgh, Paris and Venice. At that time, according to federal statistics, Hamburg Airlines was the nation's second-largest independent airline, with 160,000 passengers transported.

With the reunification of Germany, flights to the east were added and the routes of Berlin based Tempelhof Airways were taken over, thus Berlin becoming a second hub for Hamburg Airlines. As destinations expanded, London Gatwick Airport, Kaliningrad and Riga were served. Unfortunately, Hamburg Airlines was losing money and in December 1991 was sold to Saarland Airlines (a charter air carrier), but Hamburg Airlines continued to operate independently. Block retained a 20% shareholding and was given a seat in the Saarland board.

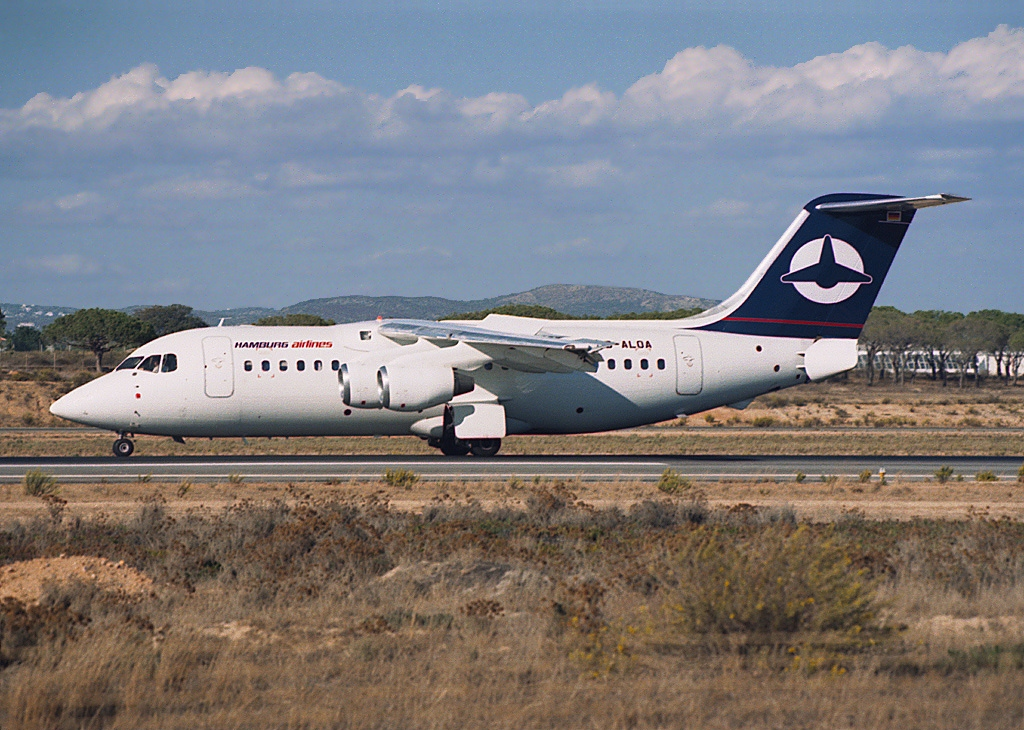
BAe 146-200

In late 1993 Saarland Airlines went bankrupt, and Hamburg Airlines ceased operations in August until revived in December of that same year. The aircraft of choice for the resurrected Hamburg Airlines was the BAe 146. Progressively the network came to include 18 different destinations. Things did not go well for the air carrier, and by 1997 it faced dire financial problems. When no buyer or merger partner could be found, Hamburg Airlines stopped flying on 21 December 1997 and was later liquidated.

== Fleet ==
Hamburg Airlines operated the following types of aircraft during its existence:

- Dornier 228
- de Havilland DHC-8
- Fokker 100
- BAe 146-100
- BAe 146-200
- BAe 146-300
