= Berlin Tempelhof Airport =

Former airport of Berlin, Germany (1923–2008)

Berlin Tempelhof Airport Flughafen Berlin-Tempelhof

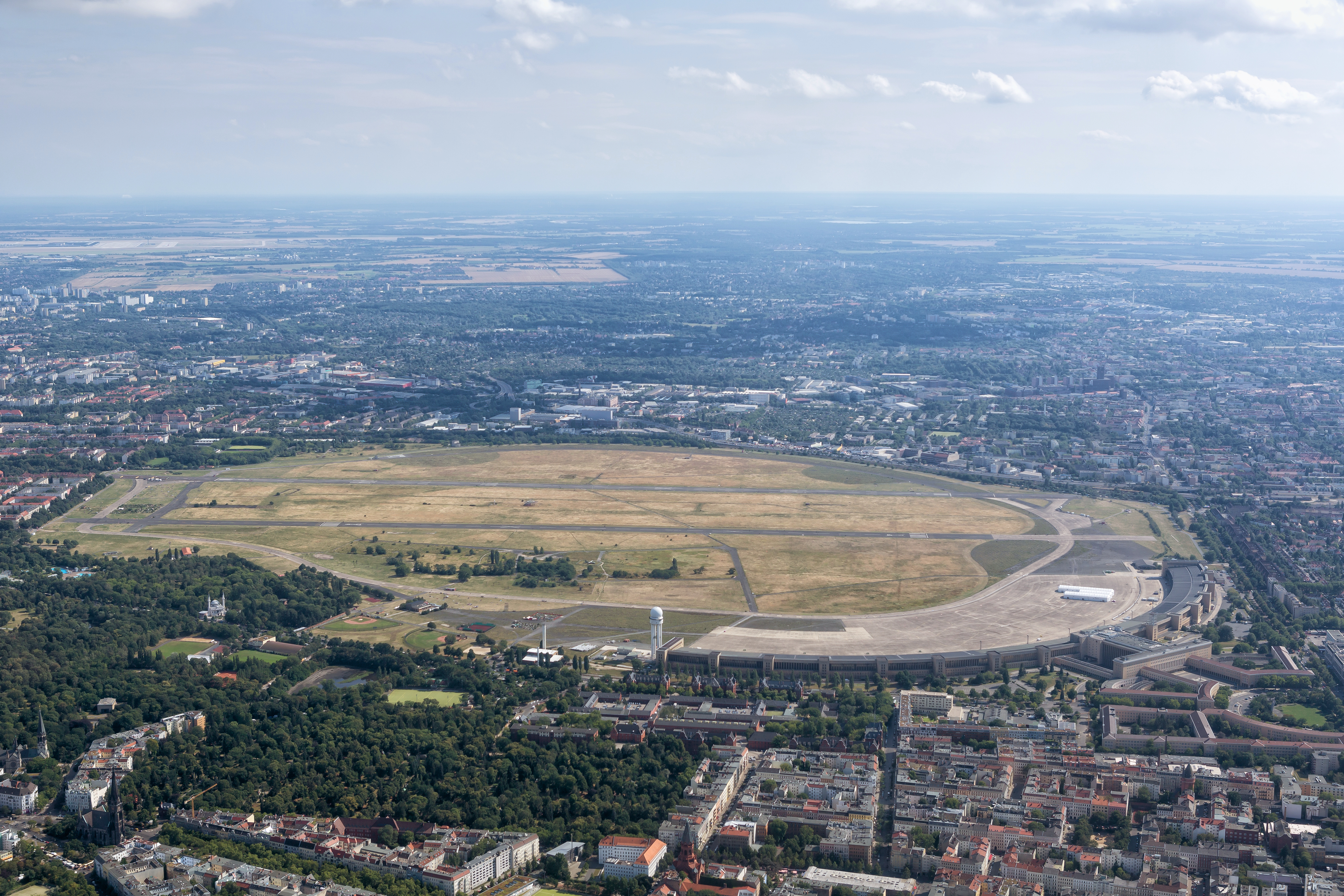
- Aerial view of Tempelhof Airport
- IATA: THF; ICAO: EDDI

Summary
- Airport type: Defunct
- Owner: Institute for Federal Real Estate; Federal State of Berlin
- Operator: Berlin Airports
- Serves: West Berlin (1948–1990); Berlin (1923–1948; 1990–2008)
- Location: Tempelhof-Schöneberg, Berlin, Germany
- Opened: 8 October 1923
- Closed: 30 October 2008
- Hub for: Deutsche Luft Hansa (1926–1945); American Overseas Airlines (1948–1950); Pan Am (1950–1975); Air France (1950–1959); British European Airways (1951–1974); Riddle Airlines (1960s); Capitol Int'l Airways (1960s); Saturn Airways (1964–1967); Autair (1960s); Overseas Aviation (early 1960s); British Airways (1974–1975); Tempelhof Airways (1981–1990); Hamburg Airlines (1990–1997); Conti-Flug (1990–1994); Lufthansa CityLine (1990–1992); Cirrus Airlines (2001–2008)
- Elevation AMSL: 164 ft (50 m)
- Coordinates: 52°28′25″N 013°24′06″E
- Website: thf-berlin.de

Map
- Location within Berlin THF/EDDI (Germany) THF/EDDI (Europe)

Runways
Direction	Length		Surface
Direction	ft	m	Surface
09L/27R	6,870	2,094	Asphalt (Closed)
09R/27L	6,037	1,840	Asphalt (Closed)
- Source: German AIP at EUROCONTROL

Berlin Tempelhof Airport (German: Flughafen Berlin-Tempelhof) (IATA: THF, ICAO: EDDI) was one of the first airports in Berlin, Germany. Situated in the south-central Berlin borough of Tempelhof-Schöneberg, the airport ceased operating in 2008 amid controversy. This left Tegel and Schönefeld as the two main airports serving the city for another twelve years until both were replaced by Berlin Brandenburg Airport in 2020.

Tempelhof was designated as an airport by the Reich Ministry of Transport on 8 October 1923. The old terminal was originally constructed in 1927. In anticipation of increasing air traffic, the Nazi government began an enormous reconstruction in the mid-1930s. While it was occasionally cited as the world's oldest operating commercial airport, the title was disputed by several other airports, and is no longer an issue since its closure.

Tempelhof was one of Europe's three iconic pre-World War II airports, the others being London's now defunct Croydon Airport and the old Paris–Le Bourget Airport. It acquired a further iconic status as the centre of the Berlin Airlift of 1948–49. One of the airport's most distinctive features is its huge, canopy-style roof extending over the apron, able to accommodate most contemporary airliners in the 1950s, 1960s and early 1970s, protecting passengers from the elements. Tempelhof Airport's main building was once among the twenty largest buildings on earth, but it also formerly contained the world's smallest duty-free shop.

Tempelhof Airport closed all operations on 30 October 2008, despite the efforts of some protesters to prevent the closure. A non-binding referendum was held on 27 April 2008 against the impending closure but failed due to low voter turnout. The former airfield has subsequently been used as a recreational space known as Tempelhofer Feld. In September 2015, it was announced that Tempelhof would also become an emergency refugee camp.

== Function ==
Tempelhof was often called the "City Airport". In its later years, it mostly had commuter flights to other parts of Germany and neighbouring countries; but it had in the past received long-haul, wide-bodied airliners, such as the Boeing 747, the Lockheed L-1011 Tristar and the Lockheed C-5A Galaxy. The first of these three first appeared at Tempelhof on 18 September 1976, when Pan American World Airways (Pan Am) flew in Boeing 747SP Clipper Great Republic to participate in the static exhibition of contemporary military, non-combat and civil aircraft at the annual open house of the United States Air Force (USAF) at the airport.

The Galaxy had its first appearance at Tempelhof on 17 September 1971, when an aircraft of the USAF's 436th Military Airlift Wing flew in from Dover Air Force Base in Delaware, United States, to participate in that year's open-house exhibition. These events respectively marked the debut at Tempelhof of the largest aircraft in commercial airline service at the time and the then-largest aircraft overall.

Tempelhof, compared to Brandenburg Airport and Tegel Airport, wasn't a particularly large airport. The layout of the airport was relatively simple - two parallel runways oriented east–west (09/27 L/R), with a single oval taxiway around the airport, with the main terminal on the north-western segment of the airport. The runways are not comparatively long, either - versus Brandenburg's 3600m and 4000m runways which can easily handle intercontinental airliners like the Boeing 747, Tempelhof has two runways at 2094m (09R/27L) and 1840m (09L/27R), which can, at most, handle Boeing 757 and Airbus A320-size aircraft.

Other possible uses for Tempelhof have been discussed, and many people are trying to keep the airport buildings preserved.

In September 2015, in the midst of the 2015 European migrant crisis, it was announced by the Berlin state government that Tempelhof would become an 'emergency refugee shelter', holding at least 1,200 people in two former hangars.

As the airport has been listed as a historic monument since 1995, preservation work has been routinely carried out, even after its closure; this includes the development of a preservation plan between 2012 and 2015, which outlined methods for maintaining the site whilst allowing for future development in the area.

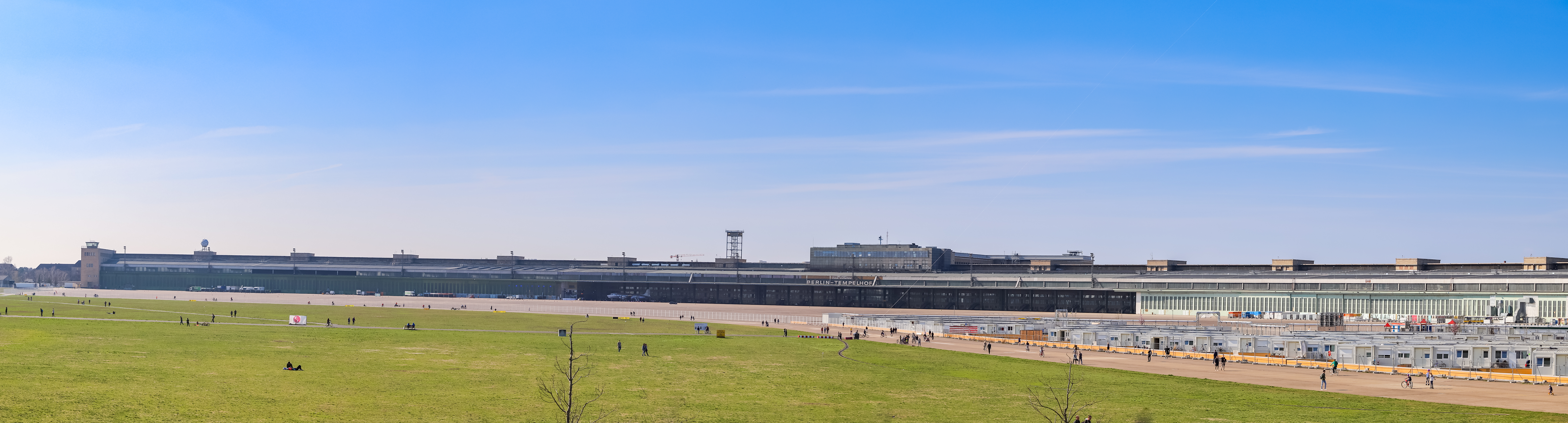
Tempelhof Airport Berlin panorama (2019)

== History ==
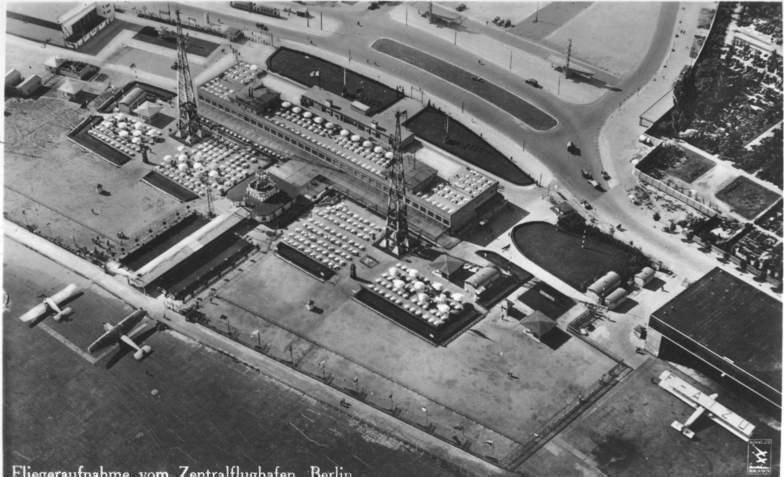
First terminal building, 1928

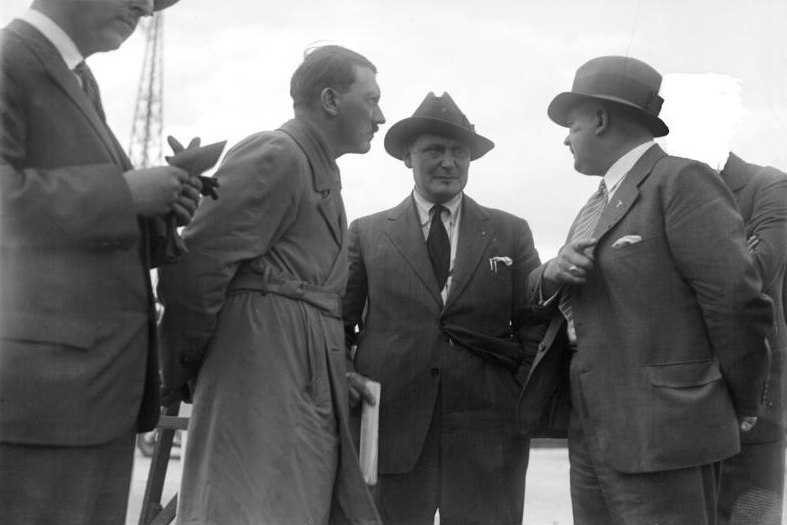
Adolf Hitler at Zentralflughafen Tempelhof-Berlin, 1932

The site of the airport was originally Knights Templar land in medieval Berlin, and from this beginning came the name Tempelhof. Later, the site was used as a parade field by the Prussian army from 1720 to the start of World War I. In 1909, French aviator Armand Zipfel made the first flight demonstration in Tempelhof, followed by Orville Wright later that same year. Tempelhof was first officially designated as an airport on 8 October 1923. Deutsche Luft Hansa was founded in Tempelhof on 6 January 1926. The airport's first permanent terminal building was completed in 1929.

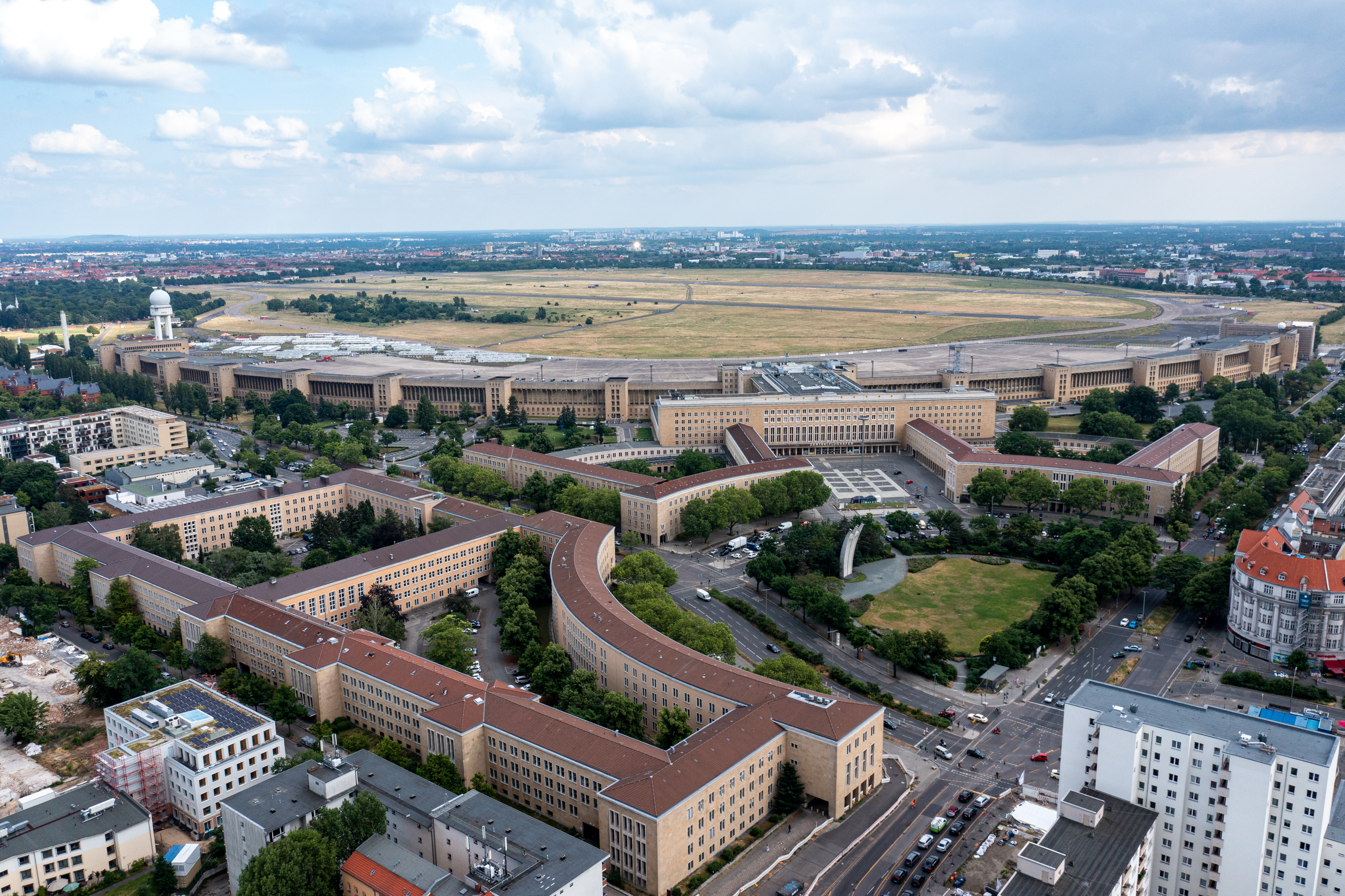
View over the former Berlin-Tempelhof Airport with the second terminal building, 2021

As part of Albert Speer's plan for the reconstruction of Berlin during the Nazi era, Prof. Ernst Sagebiel was ordered to replace the old terminal with a new terminal building in 1934. The airport halls and the adjoining buildings, intended to become the gateway to Europe and a symbol of Hitler's "world capital" Germania, are still known as one of the largest built entities worldwide, and have been described by British architect Sir Norman Foster as "the mother of all airports". With its façades of shell limestone, the terminal building, built between 1936 and 1941, forms a 1.2-kilometre-long (0.75 mi) quadrant. Arriving passengers walked through customs controls to the reception hall. Tempelhof was served by the U6 U-Bahn line along Mehringdamm and up Friedrichstraße (Platz der Luftbrücke station).

Zentralflughafen Tempelhof-Berlin had the advantage of a central location just minutes from the Berlin city centre and quickly became one of the world's busiest airports. Tempelhof saw its greatest pre-war days during 1938–1939, when up to 52 foreign and 40 domestic flights arrived and departed daily from the old terminal while the new one was still under construction.

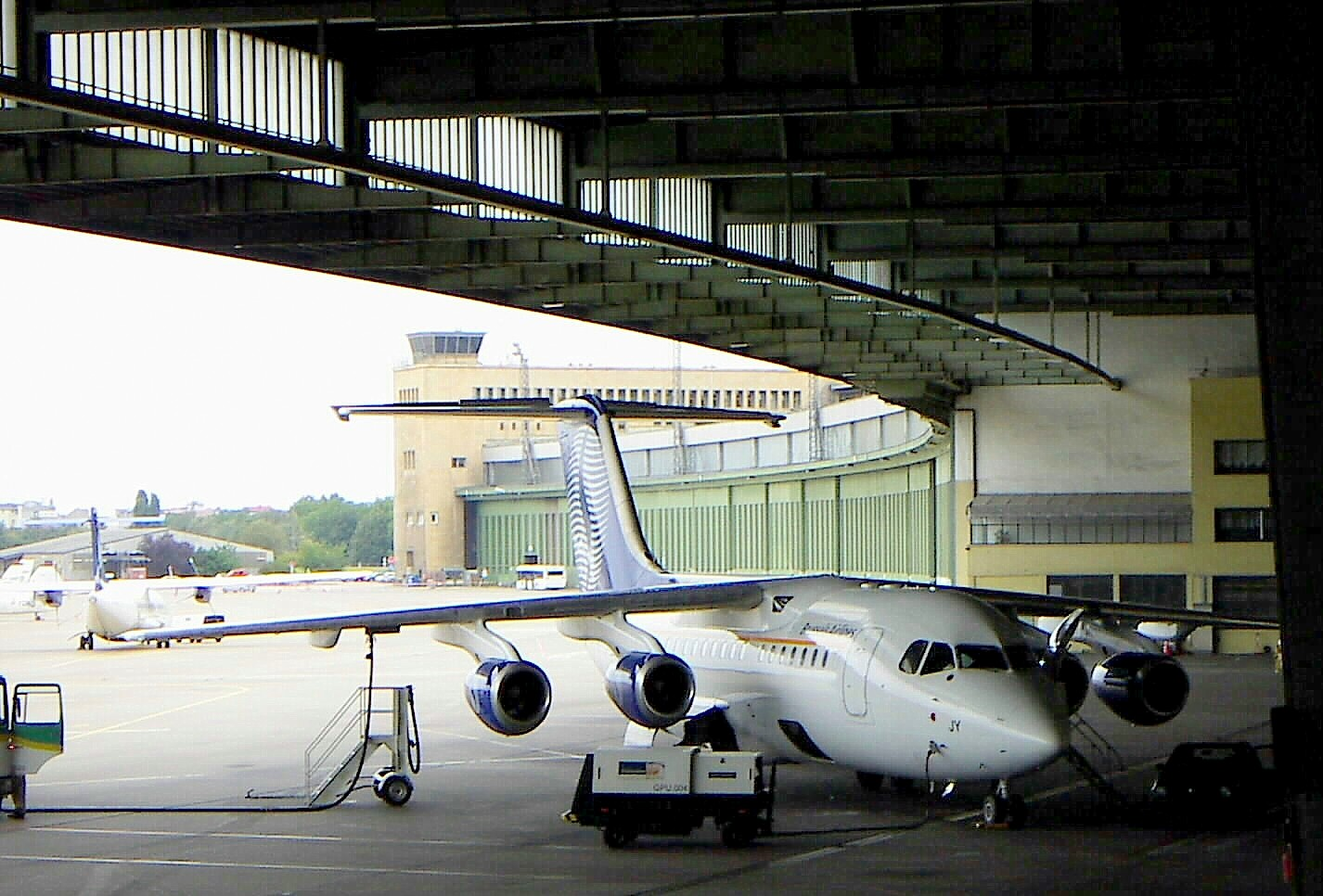
A 2004 view of the curved shape, and overhanging awning to protect passengers from the weather, of the new air terminal that started construction in 1936, with completion delayed by WWII

The new air terminal was designed as headquarters for Deutsche Luft Hansa (moved in 1938), the German national airline at that time. As a forerunner of today's modern airports, the building was designed with many unique features, including giant arc-shaped aircraft hangars. Although under construction for more than ten years, it was never finished because of World War II. For passengers and freight, the 1927-built terminal stayed in use until 24 April 1945.

The building complex was designed to resemble an eagle in flight with semicircular hangars forming the bird's spread wings. A 1.6-kilometre-long (1 mi) hangar roof was to have been laid in tiers to form a stadium for spectators at air and ground demonstrations. Norman Foster called Tempelhof "one of the really great buildings of the modern age".

=== World War II ===
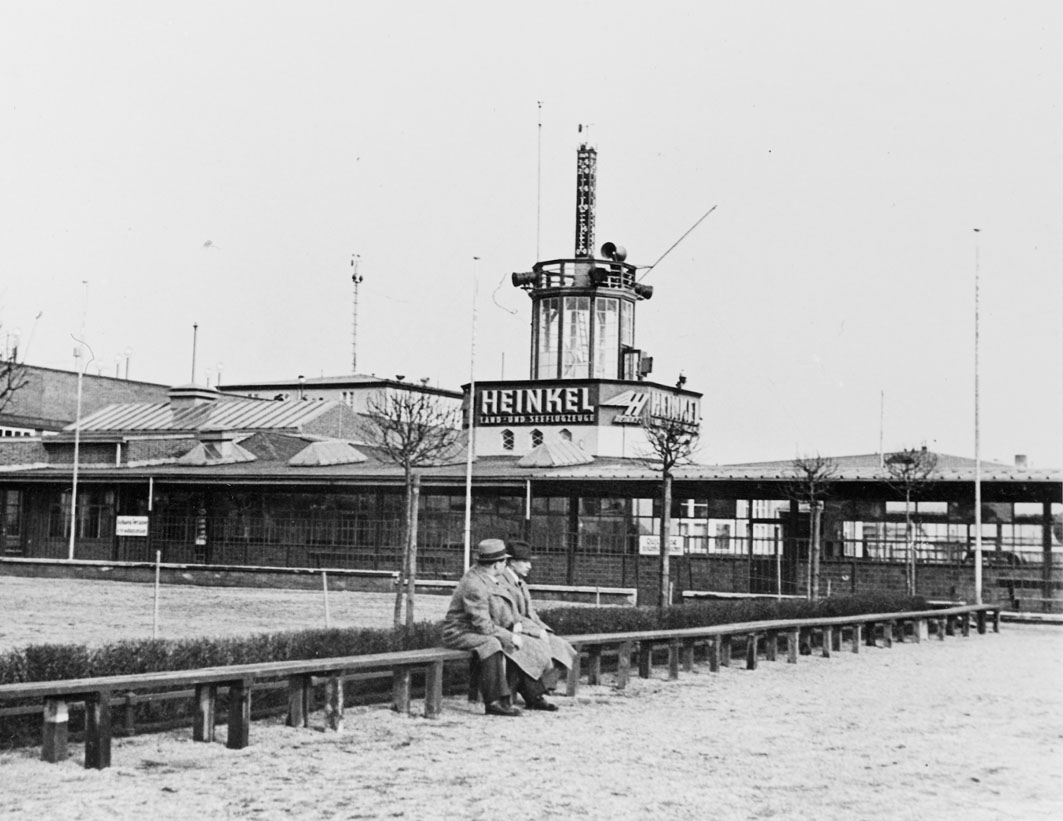
The airport in 1937, at the 1927-built terminal building

Fearing Allied bombing of airports, all German civil aviation was halted on 2 September 1939, but gradually restarted from 1 November. However, the 1927-built terminal remained closed to all civil aviation, and all civilian aircraft movements to and from Berlin were transferred to an airfield in Rangsdorf until 7 March 1940, when the 1927 terminal was reopened and civil aviation continued until 24 April 1945.

From January 1940 until early 1944, Weser Flugzeugbau assembled Junkers Ju 87 "Stuka" dive bombers; thereafter, it assembled Focke-Wulf Fw 190 fighter planes in the still unfurnished main hall and hangars 3 to 7 of the new terminal, which were supplied by a railway and trucks via a connecting tunnel. Hangars 1 and 2 were not used to assemble aircraft as these were already used by Luft Hansa for its own planes. Aircraft parts were brought in from all over the city while complete aircraft engines were trucked to Tempelhof. Once the airframes were complete and the engines had been installed, the finished aircraft were flown out. The Luftwaffe did not use Tempelhof as a military airfield during World War II, except for occasional emergency landings by fighter aircraft.

On 21 April 1945, Deutsche Luft Hansa operated its last scheduled flights, and over the coming days laid on additional non-scheduled flights from Johannisthal Air Field which stopped over at Tempelhof to take on freight en route to Travemünde and Munich, where Luft Hansa had relocated its headquarters. Two days later, on 23 April, the airline's last-ever flight to depart Tempelhof left for Madrid, but was later shot down over Southern Germany.

Tempelhof's German commander, Oberst Rudolf Böttger, refused to carry out orders to blow up the base, choosing instead to kill himself. Soviet forces took Tempelhof in the Battle of Berlin on 28 and 29 April 1945 in the closing days of the war in Europe. Soviet forces combed through the old and the new terminal searching for treasures, hidden places and documents, opening all rooms.

During their search, they blew up the fortified entrance to a three-level bomb shelter for celluloid films of the Hansa Luftbild GmbH, a Luft Hansa subsidiary specialising in aerial photography. The explosion immediately ignited the celluloid, turning the film shelter under the northern office wing of the new terminal into a furnace and making it impossible to enter for several weeks. The raging inferno led the Soviet commander to order the lower levels to be flooded with water. With no functioning water supply in war-torn Berlin, this was only possible because the new terminal, which had suffered only slight war damage, had its own electricity and groundwater utility with underground reservoirs under the northerly forecourt of the new terminal close to the film shelter.

On 8 May 1945, Western Allied and German signatories of the German Surrender in Berlin and their entourage landed at Tempelhof airport. At the beginning of May, Weser Flugzeugbau opened a workshop in hangar 7 to repair streetcars. In the following weeks, Berliners raided all unguarded parts of the opened buildings searching for food or anything else useful in bartering in the black market. In accordance with the Yalta agreements, Zentralflughafen Berlin-Tempelhof was turned over to the United States Army 2nd Armored Division on 2 July 1945 by the Soviet Union as part of the American occupation sector of Berlin. This agreement was later formalised by the August 1945 Potsdam Agreement, which formally divided Berlin into four occupation sectors.

The 852nd Engineer Aviation Battalion arrived at Tempelhof (Code Number R-95) on 10 July 1945 and conducted the original repairs in the new terminal. After the Allied Control Council had agreed upon West Berlin Air Corridors under control of the Berlin Air Safety Centre, these opened in February 1946, enabling civil aviation at Tempelhof to restart.

=== Berlin Airlift ===
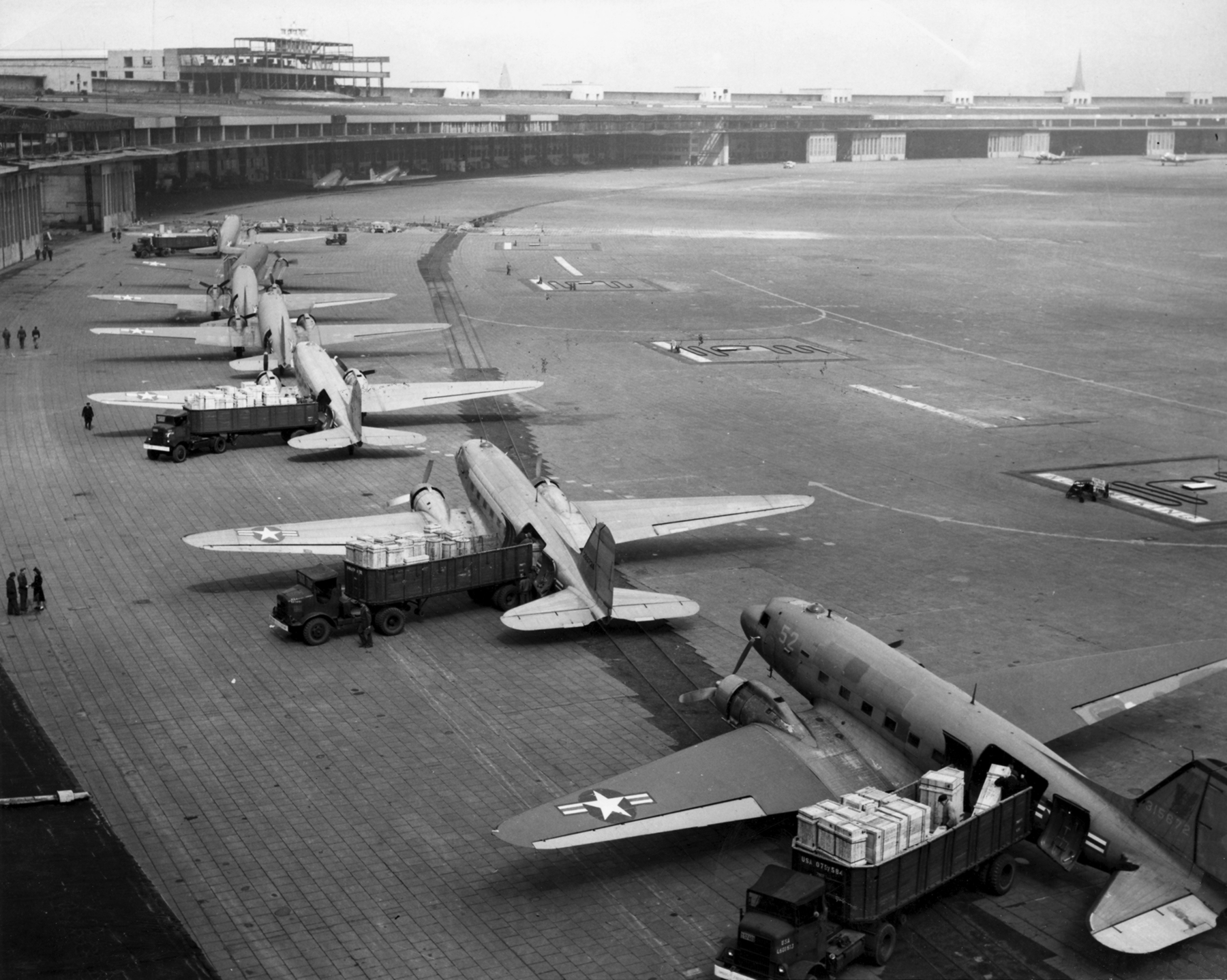
USAF Douglas C-47 transport planes preparing to take off from Tempelhof during the Berlin Airlift, August 1948

On 20 June 1948, Soviet authorities, claiming technical difficulties, halted all traffic by land and by water into or out of the western-controlled sectors of Berlin. The only remaining access routes into the city were three 20 mi (32 km)-wide air corridors across the Soviet Zone of Occupation. Faced with the choice of abandoning the city or attempting to supply its inhabitants with the necessities of life by air, the Western Powers chose the latter course.

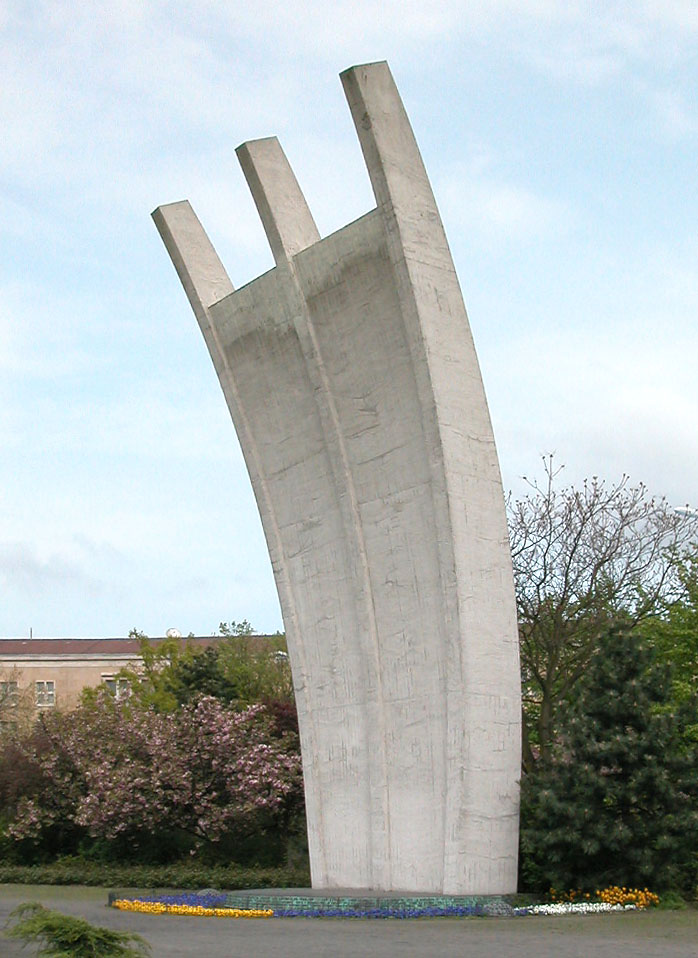
Berlin Airlift Memorial on Platz der Luftbrücke in front of the airport, displaying the names of the 39 British and 31 American pilots who died during the operation, and symbolising the three air corridors

Operation Vittles, as the airlift was unofficially named, began on 26 June when USAF Douglas C-47 Skytrains carried 80 tons of food into Tempelhof, far less than the estimated 4,500 tons of food, coal and other essential supplies needed daily to maintain a minimum level of existence. But this force was soon augmented by United States Navy and Royal Air Force cargo aircraft, as well as British European Airways (BEA) and many of Britain's fledgling wholly privately owned, independent airlines.

The last included Freddie Laker's Air Charter, Eagle Aviation and Skyways. On 15 October 1948, to promote increased safety and cooperation between the separate US and British airlift efforts, the Allies created a unified command – the Combined Airlift Task Force under Maj. Gen. William H. Tunner, USAF – at Tempelhof. To facilitate the command and control, as well as the unloading of aircraft, the USAF 53d Troop Carrier Squadron was temporarily assigned to Tempelhof.

The grass runways usual in Germany until then could not cope with the great demand, and a subsequently built runway containing perforated steel matting (Note: also known as Pierced Steel Matting (PSP)) began to crumble under the weight of the USAF's C-54 Skymasters. Hence, American engineers built a new 6,000 ft (1,800 m) runway at Tempelhof between July and September 1948 and another between September and October 1948 to accommodate the expanding requirements of the airlift. The old airport terminal of 1927 was demolished in 1948 in order to create additional space for unloading more planes. The last airlift transport touched down at Tempelhof on 30 September 1949.

Tempelhof also became famous as the location of Operation Little Vittles: the dropping of candy to children living near the airport. The original Candy Bomber, Gail Halvorsen noticed children lingering near the fence line of the airport and wanted to share something with them. He eventually started dropping candy by parachute just before landing. His efforts were expanded by other pilots and eventually became a part of legend in the city of Berlin.

=== Cold War ===
As the Cold War intensified in the late 1950s and 1960s, access problems to West Berlin, both by land and air, continued to cause tension. Throughout the Cold War years, Tempelhof was the main terminal for American military transport aircraft accessing West Berlin. In 1969 one of the pilots during the Berlin Airlift, and the original Candy Bomber, Gail Halvorsen, returned to Berlin as the commander of Tempelhof airbase.

With the fall of the Berlin Wall and the reunification of Germany, the presence of American forces in Berlin ended. The USAF 7350th Air Base Group at Tempelhof was inactivated in June 1993. In July 1994, with President Clinton in attendance, the British, French, and American air and land forces in Berlin were deactivated in a ceremony on the Four Ring Parade field at McNair Barracks. The Western Allies returned a united city of Berlin to the unified German government. The U.S. Army closed its Berlin Army Aviation Detachment at TCA in August 1994, ending a 49-year American military presence in Berlin.

=== U.S. Army Aviation ===
In 1951 the US Army stationed an aviation element of the 6. Infantry Brigade-(6th Infantry Regiment?) with three Hiller OH-23A Raven helicopters at Tempelhof. Over the years it became known as the Berlin Brigade Aviation Detachment (BBDE Avn.Det.). The Hiller OH-23A was soon replaced by Bell OH-13 Sioux. Further helicopters stationed over the years where Sikorsky H-19 Chikasaw (1958–1964), Sikorsky H-34 Choctaw (1962–1964), Bell UH-1B (1964–1971) and finally Bell UH-1H (May 1971– August 1994).

Fixed wing aircraft stationed at Tempelhof were Cessna O-1 Bird Dog (1965–1975), De Havilland Canada U-6 Beaver (1968 – January 1980), Cessna O-2A (1975–1979), Pilatus UV-20A Chiricahua (1979–1991), Beechcraft U-8D Seminole(1960s), Beechcraft U-21 (1970s–1986 and 1991–1994), as well as Beechcraft C-12C (1986–1991).

=== Postwar commercial use ===
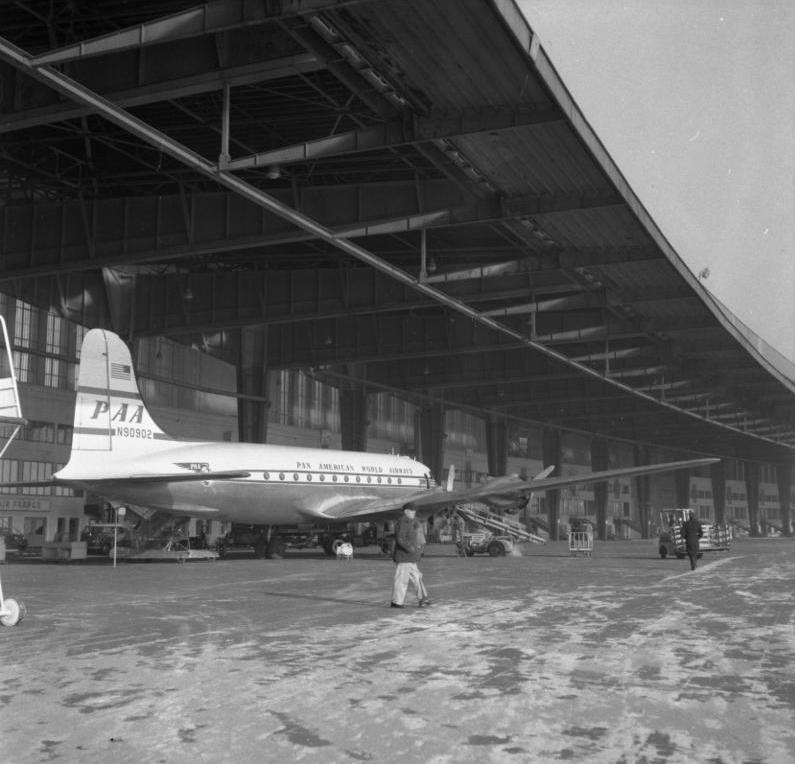
DC 4 of Pan American World Airways in 1954

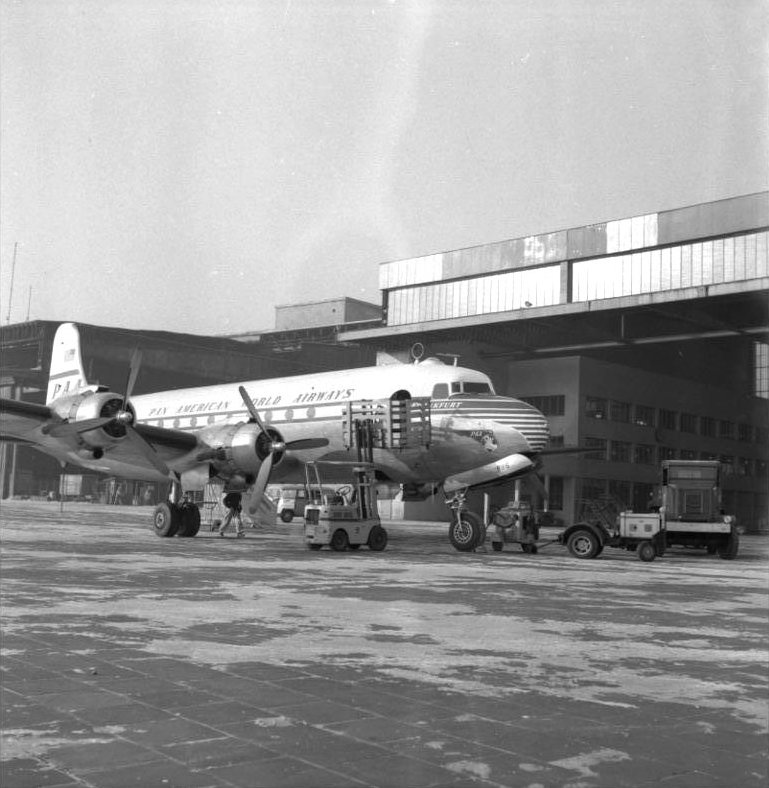
A Pan Am Douglas DC-4 seen parked in front of a hangar at Berlin Tempelhof in 1954

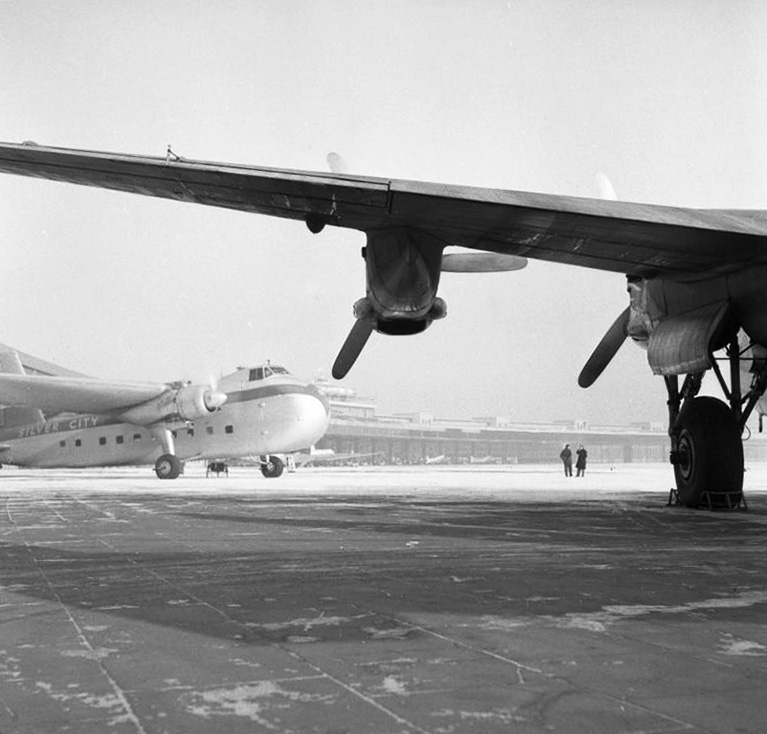
A Silver City Bristol 170 Freighter Mk 21 seen beyond the wing of an Avro York on the ramp at Berlin Tempelhof in 1954

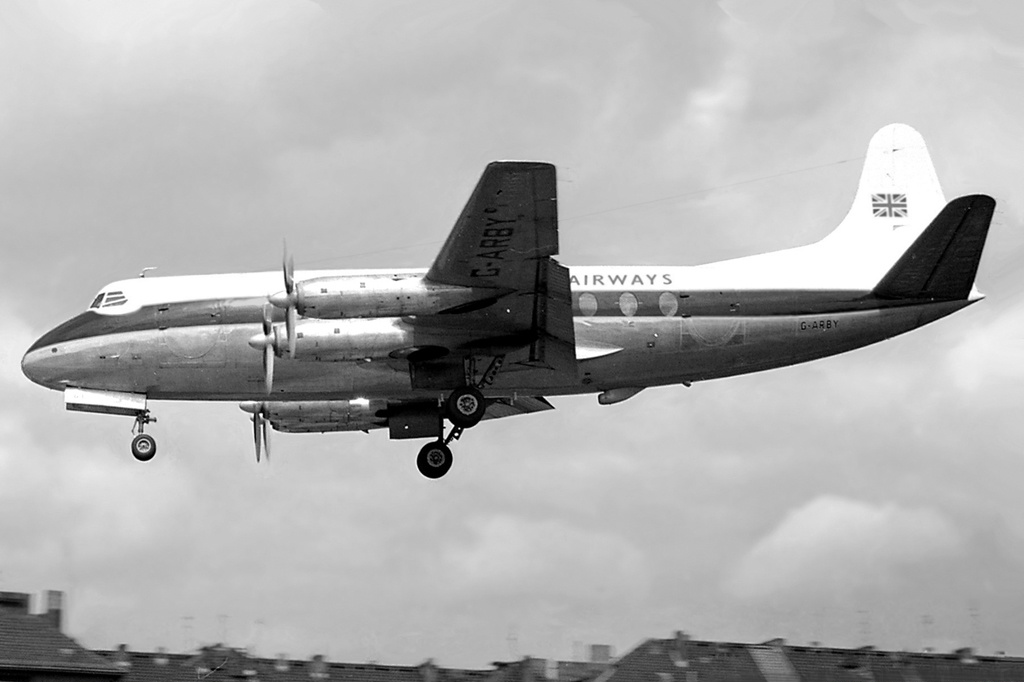
A British United Airways Vickers Viscount 700 seen landing at Berlin Tempelhof during 1962

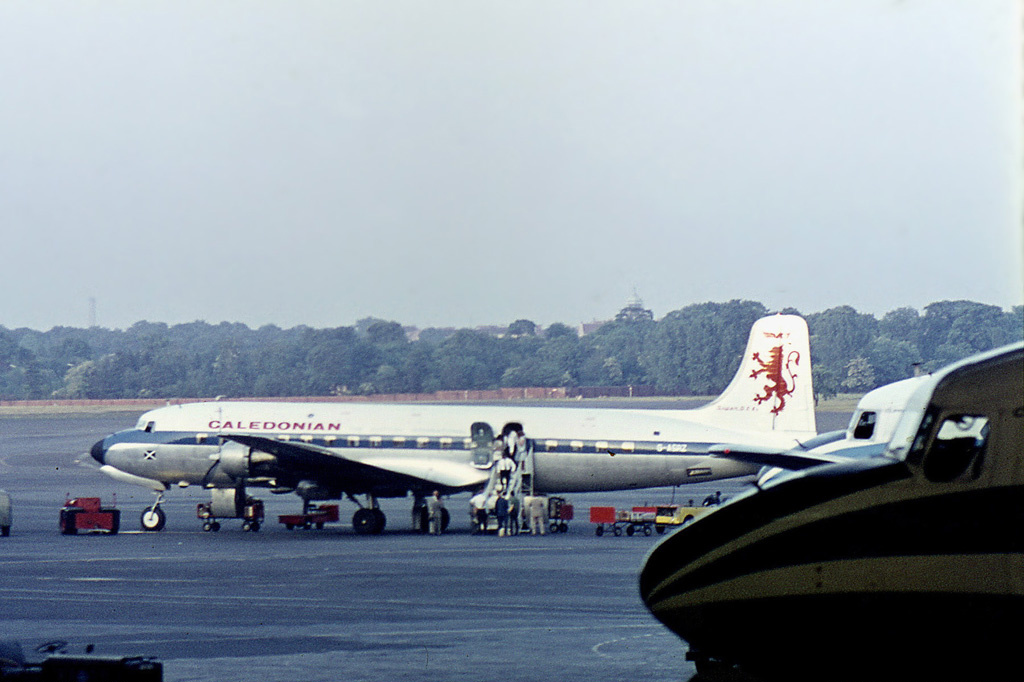
A Caledonian Douglas DC-6B seen sharing the apron with two Pan Am DC-6Bs at Berlin Tempelhof in 1964

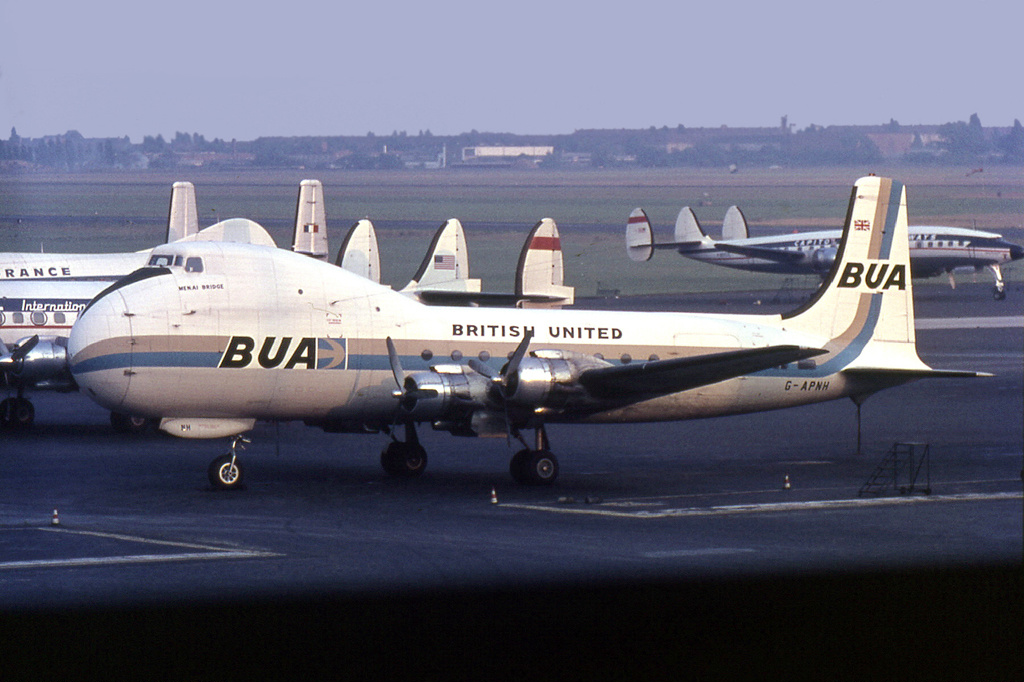
A British United Airways ATL-98 Carvair seen parked on the apron with two Capitol International Lockheed Constellations and an Air France Breguet Deux-Ponts in the background at Berlin Tempelhof in 1967

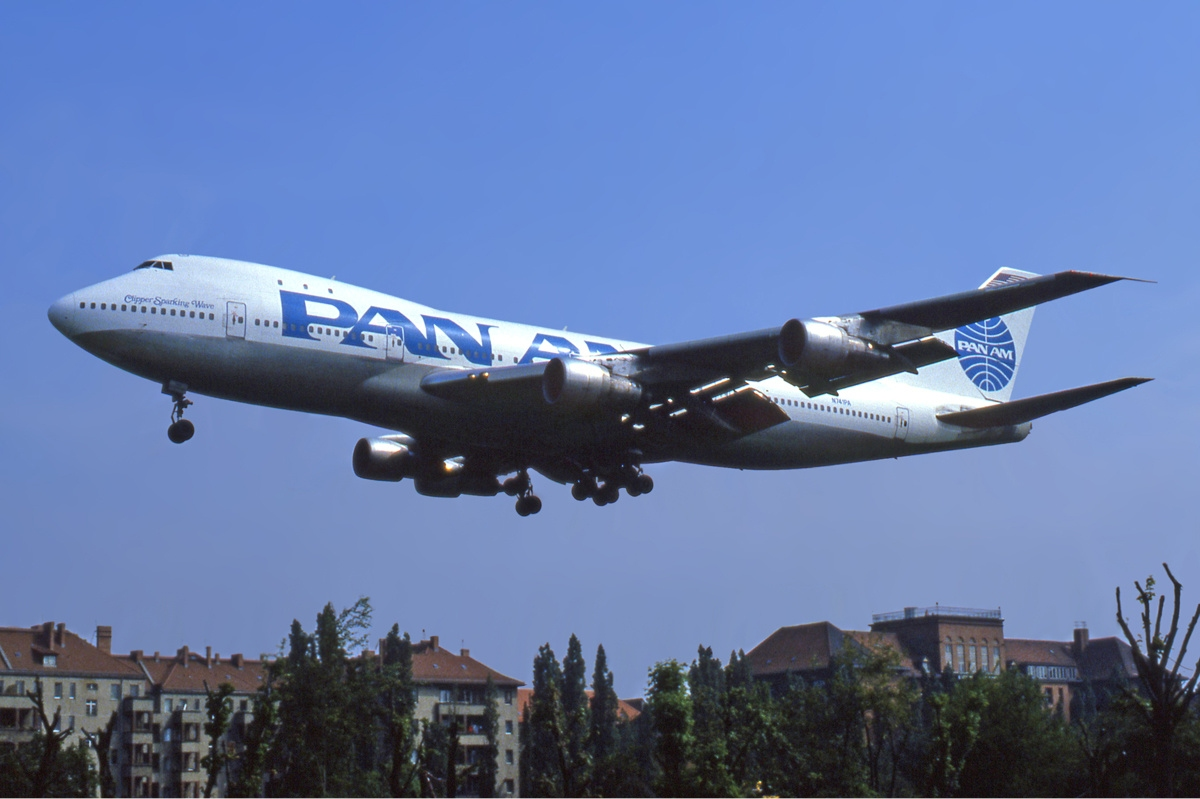
A Pan Am Boeing 747-100 seen landing at Berlin Tempelhof in 1987

==== Early operations and the Berlin Blockade ====
American Overseas Airlines (AOA), at the time the overseas division of American Airlines, inaugurated the first commercial air link serving Tempelhof after the war with a flight from New York via Shannon, Amsterdam and Frankfurt on 18 May 1946. This was followed by AOA's inauguration of West Berlin's first dedicated domestic air link between Tempelhof and Frankfurt's Rhein-Main Airport on 1 March 1948.

AOA was the only commercial operator at Tempelhof to maintain its full flying programme for the entire duration of the Berlin Blockade (26 June 1948 – 12 May 1949).

==== Expansion in the 1950s ====
Following the end of the Berlin Blockade, AOA launched additional dedicated scheduled services linking Tempelhof with Hamburg Fuhlsbüttel and Düsseldorf Lohausen from 6 March and 1 June 1950 respectively.

On 25 September 1950, Pan Am acquired AOA from American Airlines. This merger resulted in Pan Am establishing a growing presence at Tempelhof. (In addition to continuing AOA's original, multistop Berlin – New York route and dedicated internal German services connecting Berlin with Frankfurt, Hamburg and Düsseldorf, between 1955 and 1959, Pan Am commenced regular, year-round scheduled services to Cologne, Stuttgart, Hanover, Munich and Nuremberg from Tempelhof.) Pan Am's initial equipment for its new Berlin operation were unpressurised, 60-seat Douglas DC-4s, widely available at the time due to the large number of war-surplus C-54 Skymasters.

1950 was also the year Air France joined Pan Am at Tempelhof. Air France resumed operations to Tempelhof following their cessation during the war years.

This was furthermore the time Allied restrictions on the carriage of local civilians on commercial airline services from/to West Berlin were lifted. It entailed transferring responsibility for processing all commercial flights to West Berlin's city government, including the operation and maintenance of associated passenger, cargo and mail handling facilities. These changes gave a major boost to West Berlin's fledgeling post-war scheduled air services.

On 8 July 1951, BEA transferred its operations from Gatow to Tempelhof, thus concentrating all West Berlin air services at Berlin's iconic city centre airport. BEA's move to Tempelhof resulted in a significant increase in passenger numbers, as well as an increase in its Berlin-based fleet to six Douglas DC-3s.

From then on, several of the new, wholly privately owned UK independent (Note: independent from government-owned corporations) airlines and US supplemental carriers (Note: holders of supplemental air carrier certificates authorised to operate non-scheduled passenger and cargo services to supplement the scheduled operations of air carriers ( airlines holding these certificates are also known as "nonskeds" in the USA)) started regular air services to Tempelhof from the UK, the US and West Germany. These airlines initially carried members of the UK and US armed forces stationed in Berlin and their dependants as well as essential raw materials, finished goods manufactured in West Berlin and refugees from East Germany and Eastern Europe, who were still able to freely enter the city prior to the construction of the infamous Berlin Wall. This operation was also known as the Little Berlin Airlift. One of these airlines, UK independent Dan-Air Services would subsequently play an important role in developing commercial air services from Tegel for a quarter century.

During the early-to-mid-1950s, BEA leased in aircraft that were bigger than its Tempelhof-based fleet of DC-3/Pionair, Viking and Elizabethan piston-engined airliners from other operators to boost capacity, following a steady increase in the airline's passenger loads. (This included an ex-Transair Vickers Viscount 700 belonging to its newly formed independent rival British United Airways, which was damaged beyond repair on 30 October 1961 at Frankfurt Rhein-Main Airport at the end of a passenger flight that had originated at Tempelhof.)

By 1954, a year that saw 671,555 passengers pass through the airport, Tempelhof had established itself as the third-busiest airport in Europe. From 6 June of that year, Pan Am. began re-equipping its Tempelhof-based fleet with larger, pressurised Douglas DC-6B propliners. Compared with the DC-4, the new type had 16 additional seats.

In 1958, BEA began replacing its piston airliners with Vickers Viscount 701 turboprop aircraft, in a high-density 63-seat single class seating arrangement. Up to ten new, state-of-the-art Vickers Viscount 802s, which featured a more spacious 66-seat single-class seating arrangement, soon replaced the older series 701 aircraft. The greater range and higher cruising speed of the 802 series enabled BEA to inaugurate a non-stop London Heathrow – Berlin Tempelhof service on 1 November 1965. this was the only non-stop international scheduled air service from Tempelhof (Note: until 1973, the launch of daily, non-stop Berlin Tempelhof – Amsterdam Schiphol flights by Pan Am)

On 19 November 1959, a Pan Am DC-4 became the first aircraft to operate a scheduled all-cargo service from West Berlin. This service linked Tempelhof with Rhein-Main Airport once-nightly, all year round.

==== The Jet Age and Berlin Wall: 1960s ====
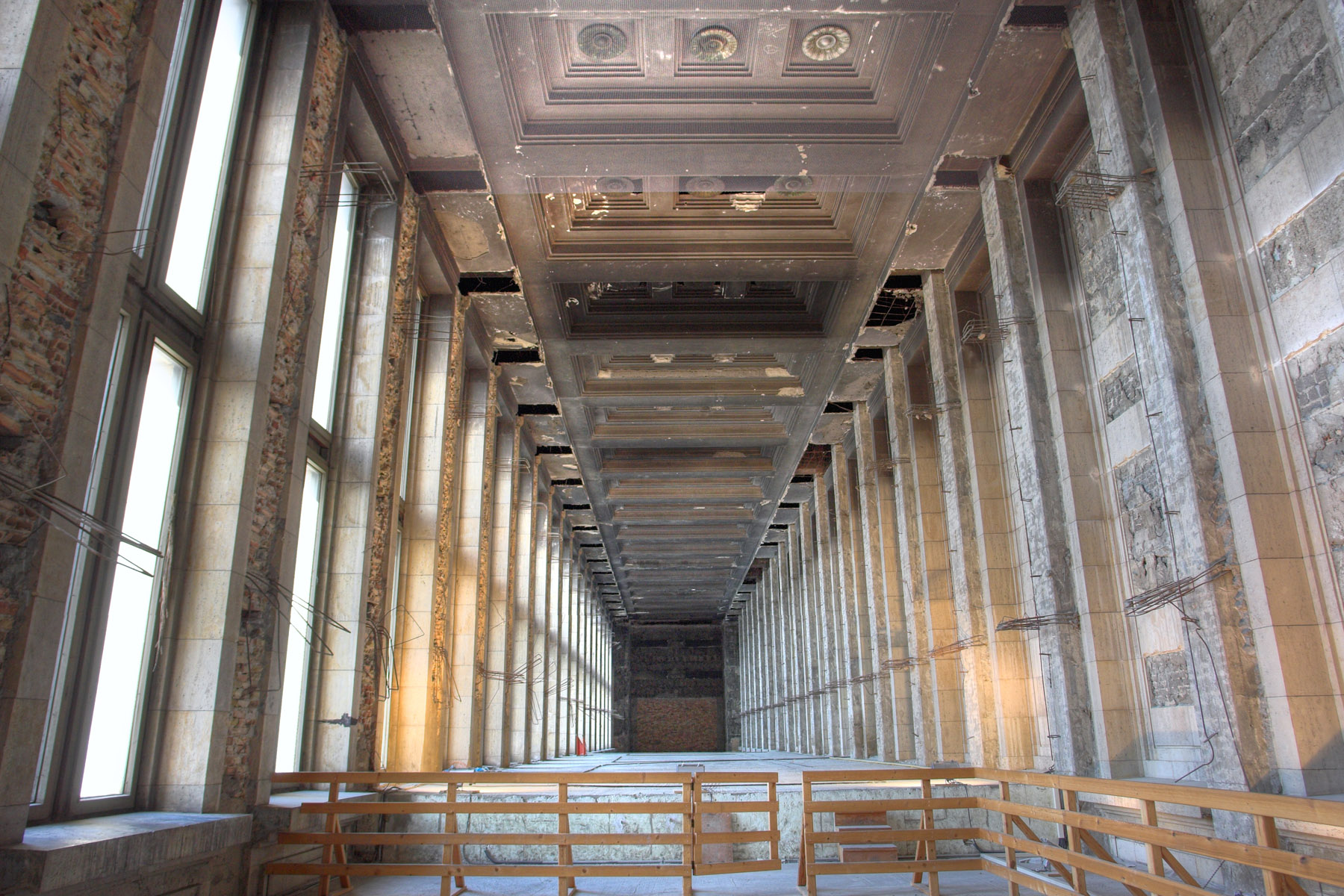
Unused upper part of the entrance hall above the added drop ceiling, 2009

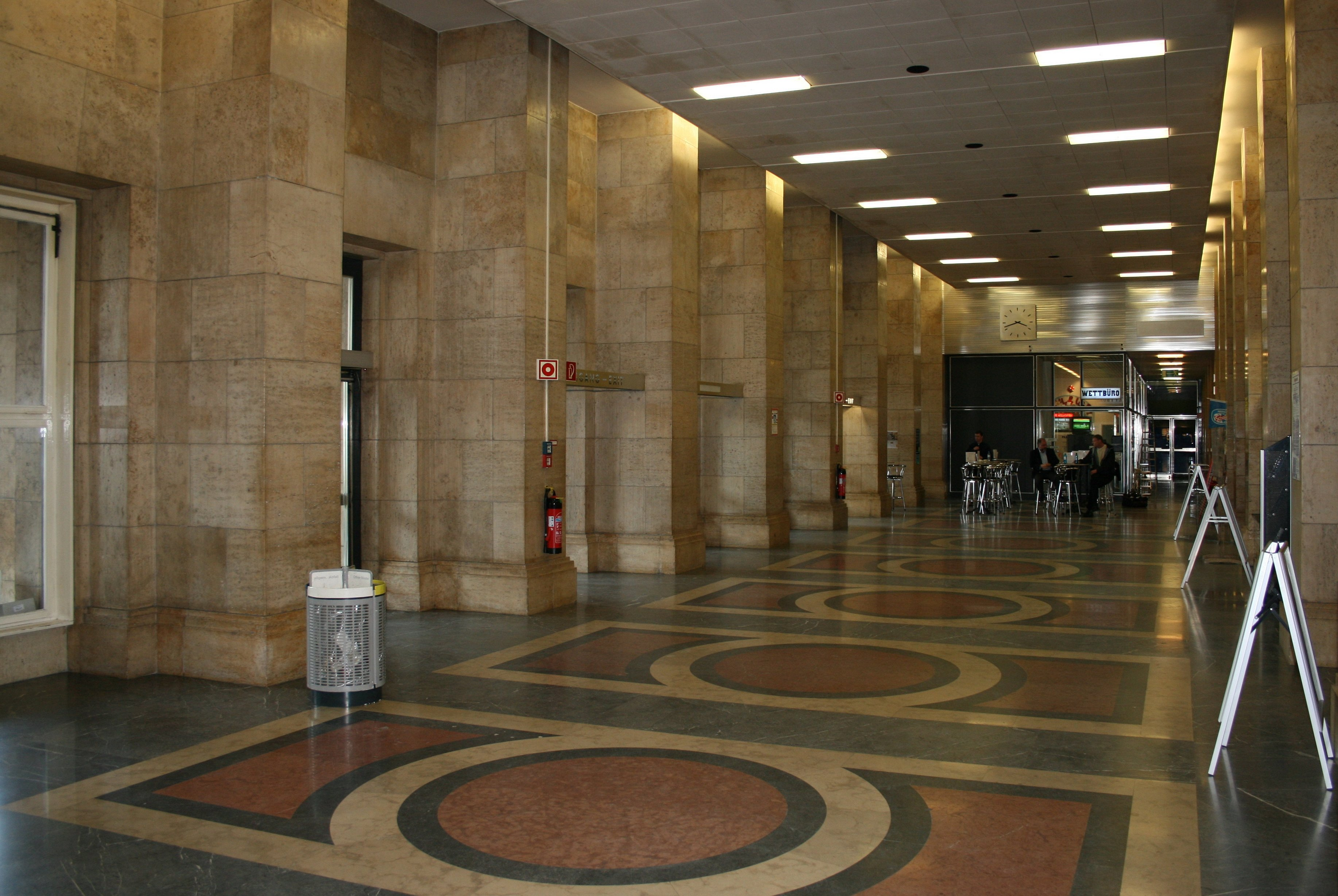
Entrance hall with added drop ceiling, 2008

On 2 January 1960, Air France, which had served Düsseldorf, Frankfurt, Munich, Nuremberg and its main base at Paris Le Bourget/Orly during the previous decade with DC-4, Sud-Est Languedoc and Lockheed Constellation/Super Constellation piston-engined equipment, shifted its entire Berlin operation to Tegel because Tempelhof's runways were too short to permit the introduction of the Sud-Aviation Caravelle, their new short-haul jet, with a viable payload. (Air France's Caravelle IIIs lacked thrust reversers that would have permitted them to land safely on Tempelhof's short runways with a full commercial payload.)

On 1 March 1960, Pan Am launched its second dedicated scheduled all-cargo flight from Berlin, linking Tempelhof with Hamburg Fuhlsbüttel.

1960 was also the year Pan Am withdrew its last DC-4 from Tempelhof. As a result, all of the airline's Berlin routes were exclusively served with DC-6Bs as of 27 June of that year. Although the DC-6B was a less advanced aircraft than either the Viscount or the Caravelle, it was more economical. By the early 1960s, Pan Am had a fleet of 15 DC-6Bs stationed at its Tempelhof base, which were configured in a higher-density seating arrangement than competing airlines' aircraft. (Pan Am's DC-6Bs were originally configured in a 76-seat, all-economy layout. The subsequent introduction of subsidies for all scheduled internal German services from/to West Berlin resulted in steady network growth as well as service frequency and passenger load increases. To cope with the sharply higher traffic volumes, aircraft seat densities were increased twice – initially to 84 and subsequently 87 seats.) This fleet eventually grew to 17 aircraft, which gave Pan Am the biggest aircraft fleet among the three main scheduled operators flying from West Berlin. It furthermore enabled it to compensate for the DC-6's lack of sophistication with higher frequencies than its competitors, thereby attaining a higher market share (60%) and capturing a greater share of the lucrative business travel market than its rivals. During that period, Pan Am moreover achieved an ultra short-haul load factor of 70% on its eight scheduled internal routes from Berlin, making the airline's Berlin routes the most profitable in its worldwide scheduled network.

Following the completion of the Berlin Wall on 13 August 1961, the West German government introduced a route-specific subsidy of up to 20% for all internal German scheduled air services from and to West Berlin to help the airlines cope with the resulting falloff in traffic and maintain an economically viable operation on these lifeline routes. These came into effect on 1 March 1962 for all tickets sold in Germany, including Berlin. (To qualify for the subsidised rate under this system, the passenger was required to purchase a round-trip ticket for a scheduled internal German flight from/to West Berlin in Germany. Once he/she had checked-in at the airport, the airline collected a coupon attached to his/her ticket, which was subsequently handed in to the relevant German authorities for reimbursement.)

By the early 1960s, a number of UK independents and US supplementals began operating regular charter flights from Tempelhof. These carried both inbound tourists from the US, the UK and other countries as well as local outbound tourists to the emerging holiday resorts in the Mediterranean. London Gatwick-based UK independent Overseas Aviation (CI) was among the first airlines the Allied Air Attachés in Bonn (Note: in the Cold War era the American, British and French embassies in West Germany's capital Bonn each had a military attaché attached, who was dealing with commercial aviation matters in West Berlin;the three Allied Air Attachés jointly exercised sole responsibility for commercial aviation in West Berlin on behalf of the governments of the United States, the United Kingdom and France during this period) licensed to operate a series of regular charter flights from West Berlin. It used Vikings and Argonauts on these services, which operated from Tempelhof under contract to the Berlin Senate and the city's Technical University as well as Berliner Flugring, a local package tour operator that began as a consortium of 70 West Berlin travel agents arranging IT flights to holiday resorts in Europe.

By 1964, BEA operated up to 20,000 flights each year from and to Berlin. These represented approximately half of the airline's total yearly flights to/from Germany and generated profits of £1 million per year. 1964 was also the year US supplemental Saturn Airways began operating a comprehensive inclusive tour (IT) charter flight programme from Tempelhof under contract to local package holiday consolidator Flug-Union Berlin, (Note: at the time, Flug-Union acted as a West Berlin consolidator for the big West German tour companies Neckermann (then part of the eponymous department store chain) and Touristik Union International (TUI), the travel arm of the Federal German Railway; it subsequently became a tour operator in its own right, when it launched its first dedicated package tour flight programme with Laker Airways from Tegel Airport in August 1968) using Douglas DC-6A/Cs and DC-7Cs. On 2 December of that year, a Boeing 727-100 became the first jet aircraft to land at Tempelhof. Boeing had leased the aircraft to Pan Am for a special flight from Frankfurt to Berlin to demonstrate to the airline the 727's ability to operate from Tempelhof's short runways. Pan Am indicated its intention to place an order for six 727s for its Berlin operation, as a result of the aircraft using only half the 5,900 ft (1,800 m) runway during landing.

26 October 1965 marked British Aircraft Corporation's new One-Eleven jet's first arrival at Tempelhof when a British United 200 series operating a trooping flight under contract to the UK Ministry of Defence diverted from Gatow.

22 January 1966 marked the first appearance of a British trijet at Tempelhof when Hawker Siddeley flew in its HS 121 Trident 1E (Note: an improved version of the original Trident 1C BEA already operated, which lacked a short-field capability that would have made it suitable for the airline's Tempelhof operation) demonstrator aircraft (Note: the first production aircraft for Pakistan International Airlines (PIA), with the aircraft's Pakistani registration AP-ATK and PIA titles being both temporarily replaced with British registration G-ATNA and BEA titles to comply with contemporary Allied access restrictions on air transport in West Berlin) for evaluation by BEA. A week later, on 29 January, BEA began evaluating the BAC One-Eleven's suitability for its Berlin operations, with the start of a series of test flights conducted on its behalf by BAC's 475 series demonstrator. This included a number of takeoffs and landings at Tempelhof to test the aircraft's short-field performance.

On 18 March 1966, Pan Am became the first airline to commence regular, year-round jet operations from Tempelhof with the first examples of a brand-new fleet of an initial eight Boeing 727-100 series, one of the first jet aircraft with a short-field capability. These aircraft were configured in a single class featuring 128 economy seats.

Pan Am's move put BEA at a considerable competitive disadvantage, especially on the busy Berlin–Frankfurt route where the former out-competed the latter with both modern jet planes as well as a higher flight frequency. BEA responded to Pan Am's competitive threat by increasing the Berlin-based fleet to 13 Viscounts by winter 1966/7 to enable it to offer higher frequencies. This entailed re-configuring aircraft cabins in a lower-density seating arrangement, as a result of which the refurbished cabins featured only 53, Comet-type first-class seats in a four-abreast layout instead of 66, five-abreast economy seats. In addition, BEA sought to differentiate itself from its main competitor by providing a superior in-flight catering standard. (BEA's Silver Star service included complimentary hot meals on all flights whereas Pan Am merely offered free on-board snacks. Sections of the local press dubbed the contrasting strategies of the two main protagonists plying the internal German routes from Berlin – estimated to be worth £15–20 million in annual revenues – the Dinner oder Düsen? (Dinner or Jet?) battle.) Henceforth, the airline marketed these services as Super Silver Star.

The introduction of Pan Am's 727s to the Berlin market represented a major step change because of the aircraft's ability to carry more passengers than any other contemporary aircraft type used by scheduled carriers in the short-haul Berlin market, and its ability to take off from and land on Tempelhof's short runways with a full commercial payload as only light fuel loads were required on the short internal German services. Compared with BEA, Pan Am's 727s carried 20% more passengers than the British carrier's Comet 4Bs (Note: from August 1968) and up to 2 1/2 times as many passengers as the latter's Viscounts. (Note: Silver Star configuration)

Within two years of Pan Am's introduction of jet equipment on the bulk of its internal German services from/to West Berlin, its market share rose from 58% to 68%. Despite the huge increase in capacity over the DC-6B (128 vs. 87 seats), load factors dropped during the first year of operations only. (Pan Am's second year of jet operations from Tempelhof saw load factors steadying while the third saw a slight increase.) The lower seat density in BEA's re-configured Viscounts combined with higher flight frequencies, superior catering and increased promotion proved insufficient to counter the appeal of Pan Am's new jets, which were laid out in a comparatively tight, 34 in (86 cm) pitch seating configuration. This resulted in BEA's market share declining from 38% at the beginning of this period to 27% at its end. On the other hand, BEA's reduced capacity in the domestic air travel market between West Berlin and West Germany enabled it to attain higher load factors than its competitors.

From August 1968, BEA supplemented its Tempelhof-based Viscount fleet with de Havilland Comet 4B series jetliners. Although these aircraft could operate from Tempelhof's short runways with a restricted payload, they were not suited to the airline's ultra short-haul operation from Berlin (average stage length: 230 mi (370 km)) given the high fuel consumption of the Comet, especially when operating at the mandatory 10,000 ft (3,000 m) altitude inside the Allied air corridors. This measure was therefore only a stopgap until most of BEA's Berlin fleet was equipped with 97-seat, single-class BAC One-Eleven 500s. (Note: the temporary use of Comet 4Bs on BEA's Berlin routes enabled Viscount crews to undergo conversion training on the One-Eleven) BEA's re-equipment of its Berlin fleet with brand-new One-Eleven 500 jets was central to the airline's competitive strategy to regain ground lost to Pan Am's 727s. The new One-Eleven 500, which BEA called the Super One-Eleven, operated its first scheduled service from Berlin on 1 September 1968. It began replacing the airline's Berlin-based Viscounts from 17 November 1968.

1968 was also the year all non-scheduled services, i.e. primarily the rapidly growing number of inclusive tour charter flights, were concentrated at Tegel to alleviate increasing congestion at Tempelhof and to make better use of Tegel, which was underutilised at the time.

Air France, West Berlin's third scheduled carrier, which had suffered a continuous traffic decline ever since the transfer of Berlin operations to more distant Tegel at the beginning of 1960 due to Tempelhof's operational limitations that made it unsuitable for its Caravelles, (Note: from a peak of 11% of all West Berlin scheduled air traffic prior to the move from Tempelhof) was worst affected by the equipment changes at the latter airport during the mid-to-late 1960s. Over this period, the French airline's market share halved from 9% to less than 5% despite having withdrawn from Tegel–Düsseldorf in summer 1964 (Note: Air France had already discontinued Berlin–Nuremberg services prior to its move to Tegel) and concentrated its limited resources on Tegel–Frankfurt and Tegel–Munich to maximise the competitive impact on the latter two routes. To reverse growing losses on its Berlin routes resulting from load factors as low as 30%, Air France decided to withdraw from the internal German market entirely and instead enter into a joint venture with BEA. This arrangement entailed the latter taking over the former's two remaining German domestic routes to Frankfurt and Munich and operating these with its own aircraft and flightdeck crews from Tempelhof. It also entailed repainting the fins of the BEA One-Eleven 500s in a neutral, dark-blue scheme featuring Super One-Eleven titles instead of BEA's "Speedjack" motif. The Air France-BEA joint venture became operational in spring 1969 and terminated in autumn 1972.

==== Decline and relocation ====
Commercial air traffic from/to Berlin Tempelhof peaked in 1971 at just above 5 1/2 million passengers (out of a total of 6.12 million passengers for all West Berlin airports during that year (Note: Tempelhof: 5,560,000; Tegel: 560,000)). This represented more than 90% of West Berlin's commercial air traffic and made its iconic city centre airport Germany's second-largest. (Note: after Frankfurt, in terms of passengers handled per annum) With 3 1/2 million passengers, Pan Am accounted for the bulk of this traffic while almost all of the remaining 2 million accrued to BEA. 1971 was also the year the latter's last Berlin-based Viscount departed the city.

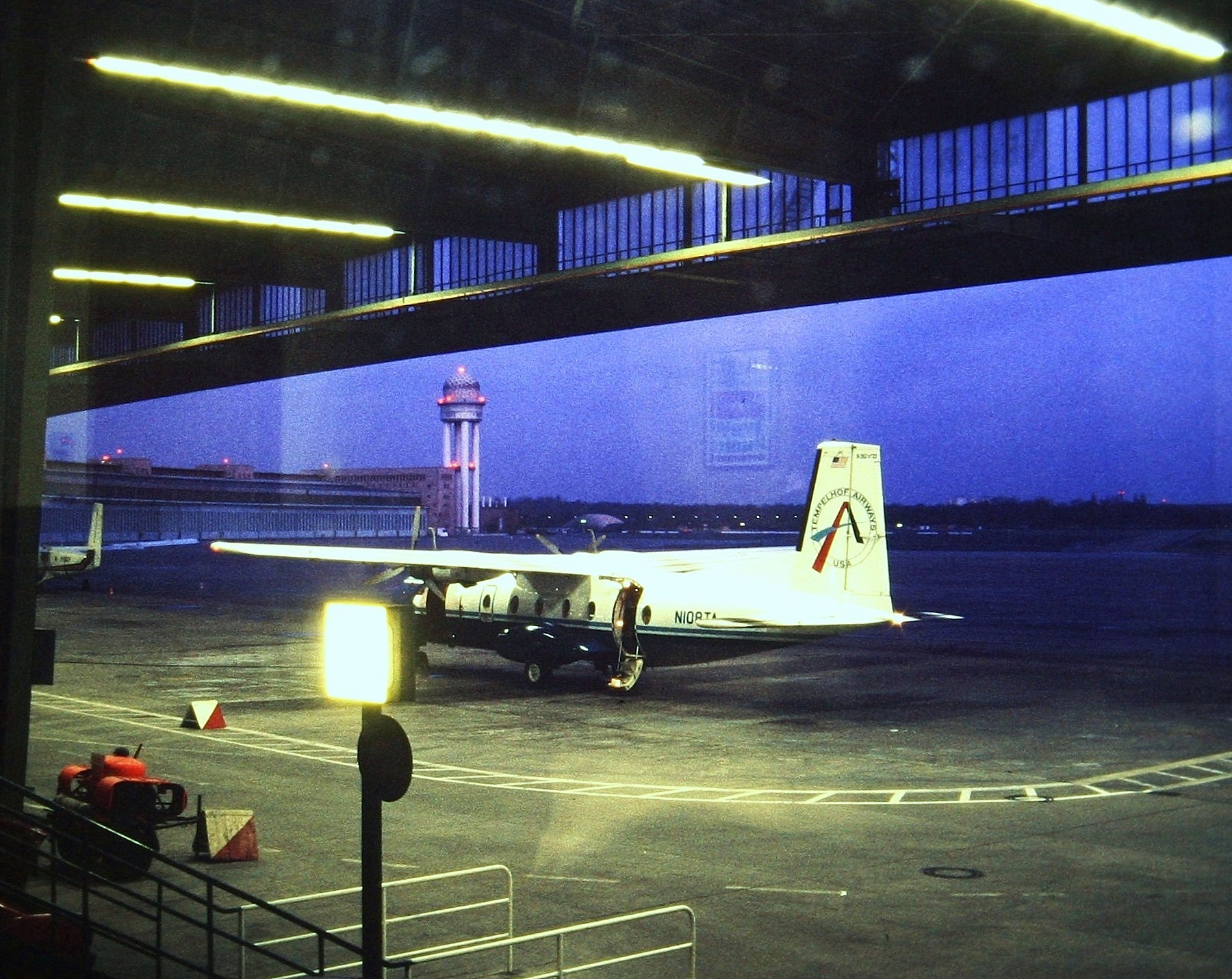
Nord 262 of Tempelhof Airways, Airport Berlin Tempelhof, 1988

East Germany's relaxation of border controls affecting all surface transport modes between West Berlin and West Germany across its territory from 1972 onwards resulted in a decline of scheduled internal German air traffic from/to West Berlin. This was further compounded by the economic downturn in the wake of the 1973 oil crisis. The resulting fare increases that were intended to recover the airlines' higher operating costs caused by steeply rising jet fuel prices led to a further drop in demand. This in turn resulted in a major contraction of Pan Am's and BEA's/British Airways's internal German operations, necessitating a reduction in both airlines' Berlin-based fleets and workforces in an attempt to contain growing losses these once profitable routes generated by the mid-1970s.

On 1 September 1975, Pan Am and British Airways moved their entire Berlin operation to the newly built terminal at Tegel Airport. Following Pan Am's and British Airways's move to Tegel, commercial operations at Tempelhof ceased, resulting in exclusive use by the US military.

From 1978, Pan Am relocated its 727 flightdeck crew training from Miami International Airport to Berlin Tempelhof. This involved [re-]training all pilots and flight engineers who crewed the flight decks of the airline's 727 fleet, which at the time operated out of Miami to the Caribbean and Central America, as well as on the IGS routes from Berlin and intra-European feeder routes serving Frankfurt and Heathrow. Another airline that used Tempelhof to train its flightdeck crews was US supplemental Modern Air Transport. While all Modern Air commercial flights from and to Berlin principally used Tegel to take advantage of that airport's longer runways and the fact that it was not in a built-up area making for easier approaches, the airline conducted its training for Berlin-based flight deck crews at Tempelhof between 1968 and 1974. The latter was also the US supplemental's (and other Tegel-based operators') designated diversion airport in bad weather in the Tegel area.

==== Revival and final years ====
Commercial operations restarted in 1981, when US-incorporated regional airline start-up Tempelhof Airways began a corporate shuttle between Tempelhof and Paderborn under contract to former German computer manufacturer Nixdorf whose main factories and offices were located in Paderborn and West Berlin respectively. Tempelhof Airways's initial equipment comprised Cessna Conquest and Piper Navajo executive aircraft. In 1985, the airline converted the Tempelhof–Paderborn corporate shuttle into a full-fledged scheduled service using a Nord 262 commuter turboprop.

The end of the Cold War and German reunification opened Tempelhof for non-allied air traffic on 3 October 1990. US President Bill Clinton christened a new Boeing C-17 Globemaster III transport plane (serial number 96-0006) the Spirit of Berlin at Tempelhof on 12 May 1998, to commemorate the 49th anniversary of the end of the Berlin Blockade on 12 May 1949.

Towards the end, commercial use was mostly in the form of small commuter aircraft flying regionally. Plans had been in place to shut down Tempelhof and Tegel, and make the new Brandenburg Airport the sole commercial airport for Berlin.

=== Closing down air traffic ===
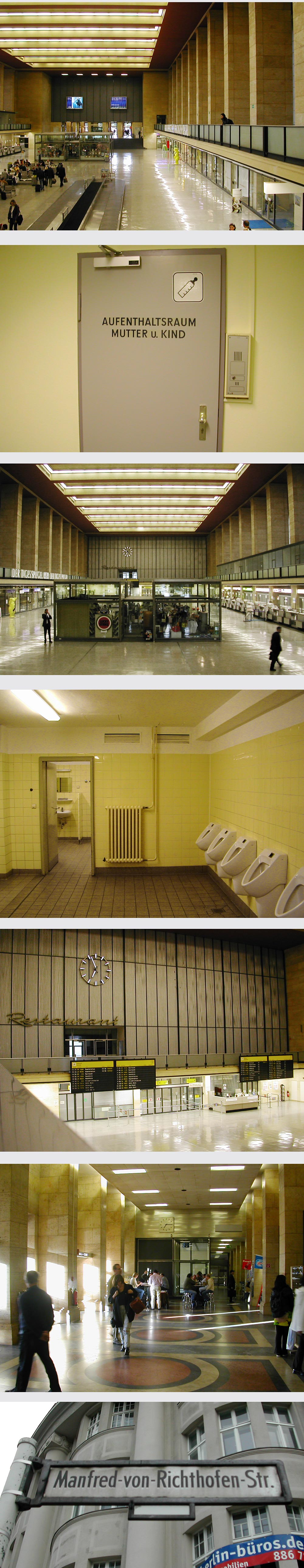

In 1996, the mayor of Berlin Eberhard Diepgen, Brandenburg minister-president Manfred Stolpe and the federal transport minister Wissmann established the so-called "Consensus resolution". The entire planning aimed at concentrating domestic and international air traffic in Berlin and Brandenburg at one airport: Berlin-Schönefeld International Airport.

To ensure investment protection as well as to fend off opposition to Schönefeld International's expansion, it was mandated that first Tempelhof and then Tegel must be closed. On 4 December 2007, the Federal Administrative Court of Germany (Bundesverwaltungsgericht) made the final decision as court of last instance to close Tempelhof Airport.

=== Referendum against closure ===
An initiative for a nonbinding referendum against the closure was held and failed, after the initial number of signatures required were collected. According to the constitution of the state of Berlin, the number of supportive signatures that were required to be collected within four months in order to compel a referendum amounts to 7% of the population of Berlin entitled to vote – 169,784. After the four-month period for the collection of signatures 203,408 signatures had been lodged.

The referendum was held on 27 April 2008. All eligible voters received an information brochure along with their notification. A majority of the votes was necessary to support the referendum, but this had to be at least one quarter of all eligible Berlin voters.

The initiative for keeping Tempelhof open was supported by the Interessengemeinschaft City-Airport Tempelhof (ICAT) along with a couple of opposition parties in the Berlin city parliament: the Christian Democratic Union and the Free Democratic Party citing primarily the need for an inner-city airport for business and private flyers as well as nostalgic reasons. Representatives from the ICAT suggested keeping the airport open up until Schönefeld Airport was to be completed in about 2012. The Berlin government insisted on the closure of the airport for legal, long-term economic, and environmental reasons, in particular to ensure the expansion of Schönefeld International. Environmental groups and the Green party supported them in this.

Plans for the future would include for example a Berlin airlift museum in the old terminal building, commercial space for innovative businesses, new housing and industrial areas, sports facilities, and parks. Legally the decision in favour of closure at the end of October 2008 was irrevocable and the referendum was nonbinding. A subsequent reopening would have faced high legal barriers; but some legal experts claimed there may be means to circumvent this.

The referendum of 27 April 2008 failed. Although 60.2% of the votes cast were for keeping the airport open, this was by only 21.7% of the eligible voters; short of the 25% required. Support had been highest in western districts of Berlin (up to 80%), but opposition (only 30% approval) and disinterest was prevalent in the eastern districts. Voter turnout of 36% was low. Air traffic at Tempelhof Airport ceased for good on 30 October and the official licence expired in mid-December.

A "Goodbye Tempelhof" gala was held at Tempelhof airport for eight hundred invited guests in the last hours of 30 October. Meanwhile, protesters against the closing held a candle vigil in front on the Platz der Lufbrücke. The last commercial flight was a Cirrus Airlines Dornier 328 that departed at 22:17 towards Mannheim. "Time to Say Goodbye" was sung to the spectators on the apron at the conclusion. At precisely four and a half minutes before midnight, the last two airplanes – a historical Junkers Ju 52 and an airlift "raisin bomber" Douglas DC-3 – took off in parallel, waved their wings, and flew off south-east to Schönefeld airport. The runway and air field lights were switched off at midnight.

Three Antonov An-2 airplanes flying under VFR were left stranded at the airport, as weather conditions prevented them from taking off on 30 October. They were allowed to take off on 24 November 2008, making them the last aircraft to take off from the airport.

=== Post-airport usage ===
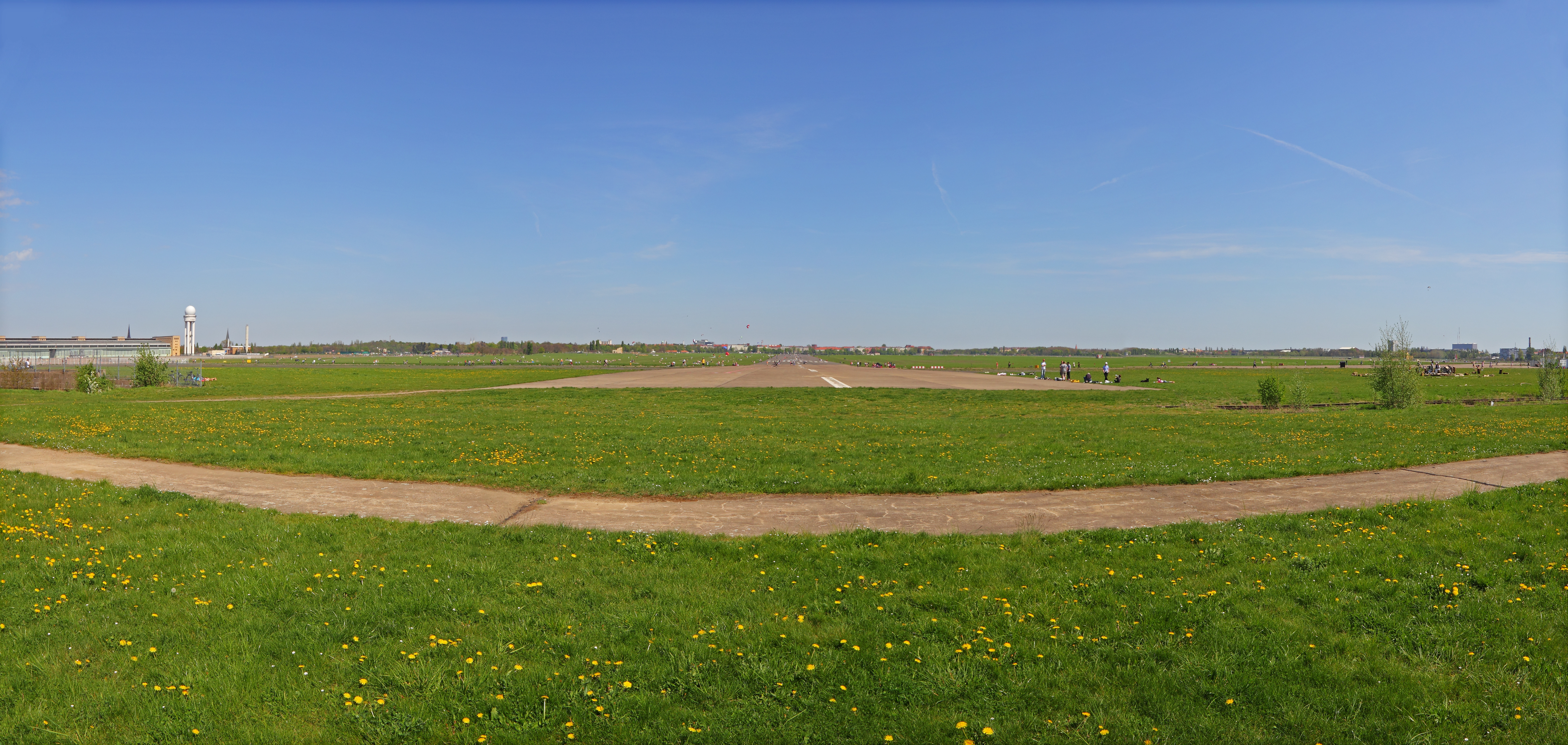
An area of Tempelhof Airport in 2012, converted into open greenspace

==== ABB Formula E Berlin ePrix ====
The ABB Formula E used variations of the Tempelhof Airport Street Circuit for the Berlin ePrix in 2015 and from 2017 to 2026. In 2020, due to COVID-19, six rounds were held on the circuit, with rounds 1 and 2 going on the reverse layout and rounds 5 and 6 having the extended layout for the first time.

==== Public park ====
In August 2009, Berlin city officials announced that the Tempelhof outfields would be opened in May 2010 as a city park. The city planned to spend an estimated €60 million on developing the park from 2010 to 2017. On the weekend of 8/9 May 2010, the outfield was festively opened as Berlin's largest public park named "Tempelhofer Feld". More than 200,000 Berliners visited the park to enjoy its wide open spaces for recreation ranging from biking and skating to baseball and flying kites. The opening ceremonies were slightly marred by some protesters unhappy about the fence that closed off the park during the night.

Entrance is free with park hours being from 6/7/7.30 a.m., depending on the season, until sunset. The grounds are maintained by Grün Berlin, a company that also looks after several other gated parks in Berlin. About 80% of the former airfield is an important habitat for several redlisted birds, plants and insects. Usage of the park is seasonally restricted to limit disturbance of Eurasian skylark breeding grounds.

In 2013, the Senate of Berlin introduced a plan to open the outer zones of the Tempelhof fields for construction of apartment and commercial buildings, and a new Berlin Central and Regional Library. An area of 230 hectares (2.3 km^{2}) was to remain a park, but was planned to be landscaped with a rain water reservoir, a 60-meter artificial boulder, groves and other new features. Landscaping was supposed to begin in 2013 and be completed in time for Germany's world horticultural exhibition IGA that was to be hosted in the park in 2017.

In a 2014 Referendum, Berlin's citizens decided to preserve the entire space of the park and prohibit any kind of development by law, thus putting an end to both construction and landscaping plans.

==== Event location ====
Tempelhof has been used since its closing to host numerous fairs and events. The first major events included a fashion tradeshow in July and the Berlin Festival 2009 concert in August. Fairs were held in the hangar. In September 2010, Tempelhof hosted the Popkomm, the international world's music and entertainment business meeting place and was one of the most important locations of the first Berlin Music Week.

The place also hosted sports events. The Berlin Marathon expo, where runners collect bibs and merchandise but is not part of the marathon route, is held at Tempelhof every September. The FIA Formula E Championship raced on the airport runways in 2015, 2017, 2018, 2020, 2021, 2022 and 2023 - with the 2020 edition hosting 6 races in a nine-day period to complete the 2019/20 season. The Deutsche Tourenwagen Masters executives were also discussing with government officials about hosting a round at Tempelhof.

When Eurovision came to Germany in 2011, the airport would have been the site of the contest if Berlin was chosen as the host city. Later, Düsseldorf was chosen.

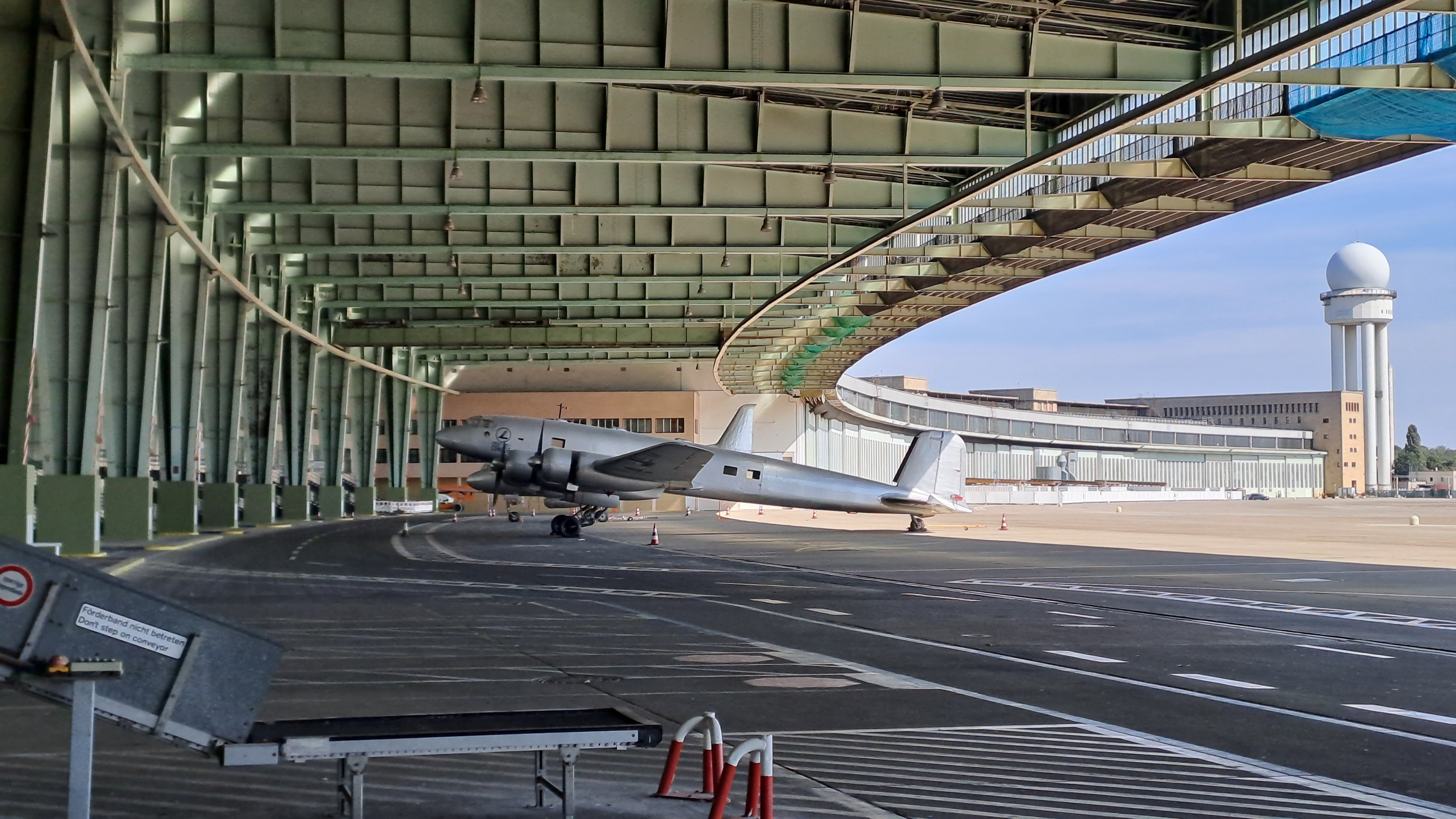
A newly-restored Focke-Wulf Fw 200 Condor on display at Tempelhof in 2023, parked outside the terminal building on the old airport apron. It will be featured as the centrepiece of an aviation museum built at the airport.

In 2022, Tempelhof was used as the site for the festival Tempelhof Sounds, a three-day music event consisting of mainly alternative, indie and rock music. There were over 30,000 visitors on each day of the festival. Shortly after the festival concluded, it was confirmed that the event would return in 2023.

==== Emergency refugee shelter ====
For some two years from September 2015, in the midst of the 2015 European migrant crisis, Tempelhof was used as an 'emergency refugee shelter', briefly holding some 2,500 people in two former hangars, before the numbers eased and the facility could gradually be wound down.

==== Creative district ====
In 2018, it was announced that the defunct airport is intended to be known as "Berlin Creative District", similar to Meatpacking District, Manhattan or Brompton Design District in Brompton, London. For instance, the former US Army officers' hotel will be altered to be a digital innovation center for startups and creative businesses, while a new visitor center was due to open in 2019.

== Former airlines and destinations ==
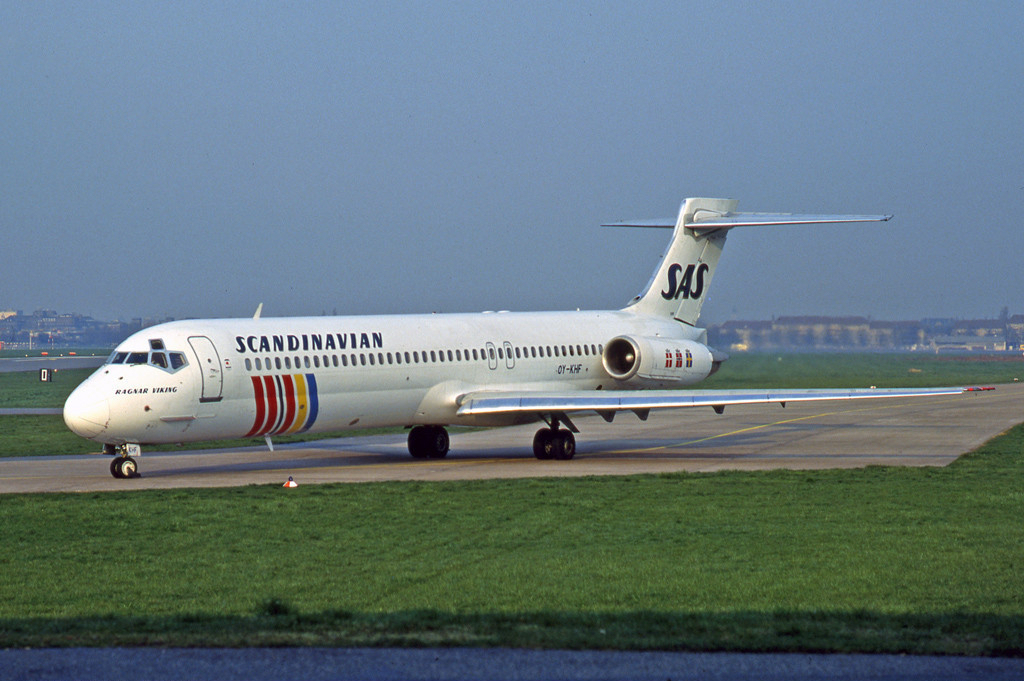
Scandinavian Airlines McDonnell Douglas MD-87 at Tempelhof Airport in 1995

Most airlines moved to Tegel and Schönefeld in the years before Tempelhof closed down. When it officially closed down in 2008 there were only scheduled flights from Brussels Airlines and Cirrus Airlines still operating from there.

Berlin Tempelhof was an important base for air taxi services with the following operators flying from/to there: AAF Aviona Air, Air Service Berlin (scheduled sightseeing flights using a historic "raisin bomber" Douglas DC-3), (Note: operated from Berlin-Schönefeld Airport starting November 2008) AIRSHIP Air Service, Bizair Fluggesellschaft, Business Air Charter, Heli Unionair, Jet Club Deutschland Chartermanagement, Private Wings, Rotorflug, TAG Aviation and Windrose Air.

== Accidents and incidents ==
On 12 June 1897, in one of the earliest recorded aircraft accidents, Friedrich Hermann Wölfert and his mechanic Robert Knabe were killed when Wölfert's lighter than air craft Deutschland caught fire at 200 m (670 ft) and crashed at Tempelhof Field.

On 29 April 1952, an Air France Douglas C-54A (registration F-BELI) operating a scheduled service from Frankfurt Rhein-Main Airport to Berlin Tempelhof came under sustained attack from two Soviet MiG-15 fighters while passing through one of the Allied air corridors over East Germany. Although the attack had severely damaged the plane, necessitating the shutdown of engines number three and four, the pilot in command of the aircraft managed to carry out a safe emergency landing at Tempelhof Airport.

A subsequent inspection of the aircraft's damage at Tempelhof revealed that it had been hit by 89 shots fired from the Soviet MiGs during the preceding air attack. There were no fatalities among the 17 occupants (six crew, 11 passengers) despite the severity of the attack. The Soviet military authorities defended this attack on an unarmed civilian aircraft by claiming the Air France plane was outside the air corridor at the time of attack.

On 19 January 1953, a Silver City Airways Bristol 170 Freighter Mark 21 (registration: G-AICM) operating a non-scheduled cargo flight from West Berlin crash-landed near Tempelhof Airport as a result of fuel starvation when bad weather at the destination forced it to return to Berlin. Although the accident damaged the aircraft beyond repair, both pilots survived.

In 1978, LOT Polish Airlines flight 165 was hijacked and forced to land at Tempelhof. The US military authorities who were in charge of Tempelhof during the Cold War era arrested the East German hijacker on arrival. Following the hijacker's arrest, the US authorities returned the aircraft, its crew and those passengers who wished to resume their journey to Poland.

In 1981, a LOT Polish Airlines Antonov AN-24 operating an internal scheduled service from Katowice to Gdańsk was hijacked en route and forced to land at Tempelhof. Jerzy Dygas, the hijacker, was on military service while taking over the aircraft. He was armed with a grenade and a single-shot pistol. The US military authorities arrested the hijacker on arrival and handed him over to the local police. At that time, he was expected to be sentenced to a 5 1/2-year prison term under West German law. Following the hijacker's arrest, the US authorities released the aircraft, its crew and all 50 passengers to resume their flight to Gdańsk.

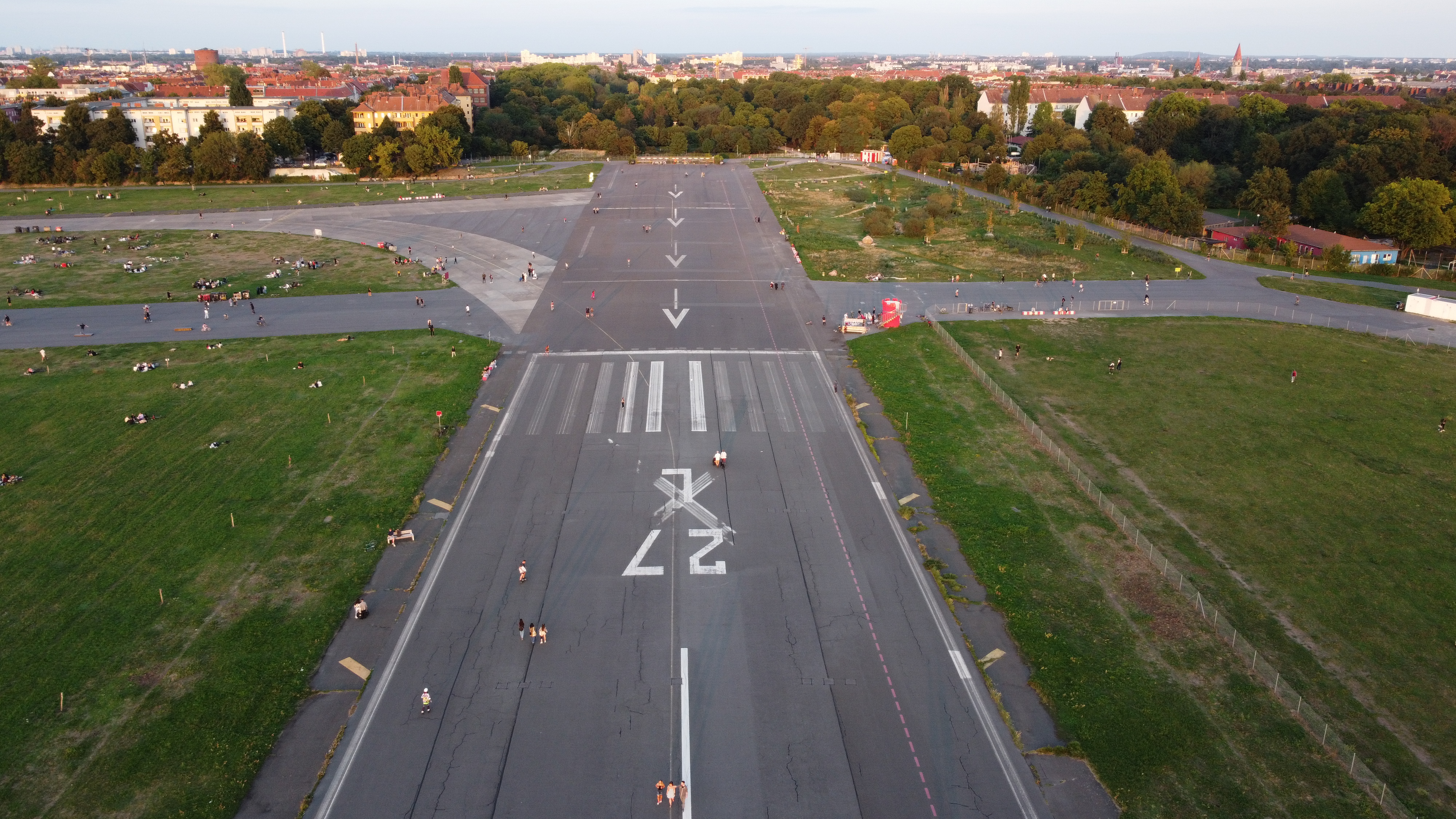
The former 27L runway where the Socata TB 10 Tobago had landed in 2010

On 26 June 2010, a private Socata TB 10 Tobago had to perform an emergency landing on the now closed Tempelhof Airport due to engine failure. It was on a sightseeing flight and the pilot was looking for a free space to land safely. The aircraft was occupied by the pilot and three passengers and had taken off from Tegel Airport. Upon consultation with air traffic control in Schönefeld, it was agreed to land on a Tempelhof runway. No one was injured during the emergency landing as the visitors of the now Tempelhofer Park scurried aside to make room for the TB 10, which came to a halt after a very short distance. Four days later, the Socata TB 10 Tobago was transported – with wings removed – by lorry back to Tegel airport. The Senate of Berlin now intends to prohibit sightseeing flights over Berlin by single-engine planes for safety reasons. It has been reported that the pilot had forgotten to switch over to the second fuel tank.

== See also ==
- Tempelhofer Feld
- Nazi architecture
- Berlin Brandenburg Airport
- Berlin ePrix
- Tempelhof Airport Street Circuit
