= Tempelhof Airways =

German regional airline

Tempelhof Airways USA
IATA	ICAO	Call sign
-	TEH	TEMPELHOF
- Founded: 1981; 45 years ago
- Commenced operations: 1982; 44 years ago
- Ceased operations: 1990; 36 years ago
- Operating bases: Berlin Tempelhof Airport
- Headquarters: Fort Lauderdale, United States

Tempelhof Airways USA was a regional airline headquartered in Fort Lauderdale, United States, based in Berlin Tempelhof Airport in West Berlin during the time when it was under the jurisdiction of the western nations. It operated German domestic services from 1981 until the reunification of Germany in 1990.

== History ==
Tempelhof Airways USA (not to be confused with Tempelhof Express) was founded in Fort Lauderdale, FL, in 1981 by Knut Kramer, a Berliner living in both Florida and Berlin. In April 1982, it began Air Taxi operations with a Piper Navajo from West Berlin's Tempelhof airport. At that time, West Berlin could, due to its status as an occupied city, only have operations by airlines of the United States, France and Great Britain.

In January 1985, scheduled flight operations began between Berlin and Paderborn using Nord 262 aircraft. Most of these flights were for the massive Nixdorf Computer offices based there. Operations were later expanded to Dortmund, Luxembourg, Augsburg and Braunschweig. In 1988, the Saab 340 was put into service for the Berlin-Hamburg route. They also operated an ambulance/medivac aircraft for many years, doing patient transport as well as organ transplant. They used a Lear 25 at first then expanded to a Lear 35. This was undertaken for the DeutscheRettungsflugwacht (German Air Rescue) organization in Stuttgart. After the Berlin Wall fell, German pilots were allowed to fly to and from Berlin and the operation was absorbed into the parent company. Several of the old TAUSA medivac pilots were hired to remain with the operation.

Following the reunification of Germany, Tempelhof Airways found itself unable to compete with other German carriers and, at the end of October 1990, all flights ceased.

== Fleet ==
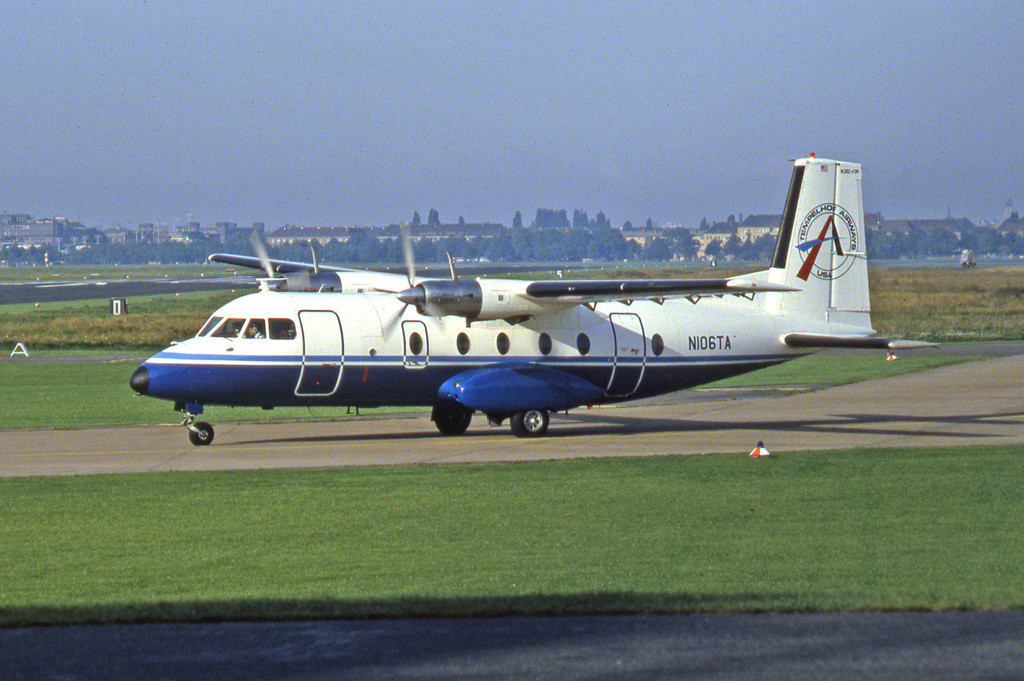
Tempelhof Airways USA Aérospatiale N 262, 1987

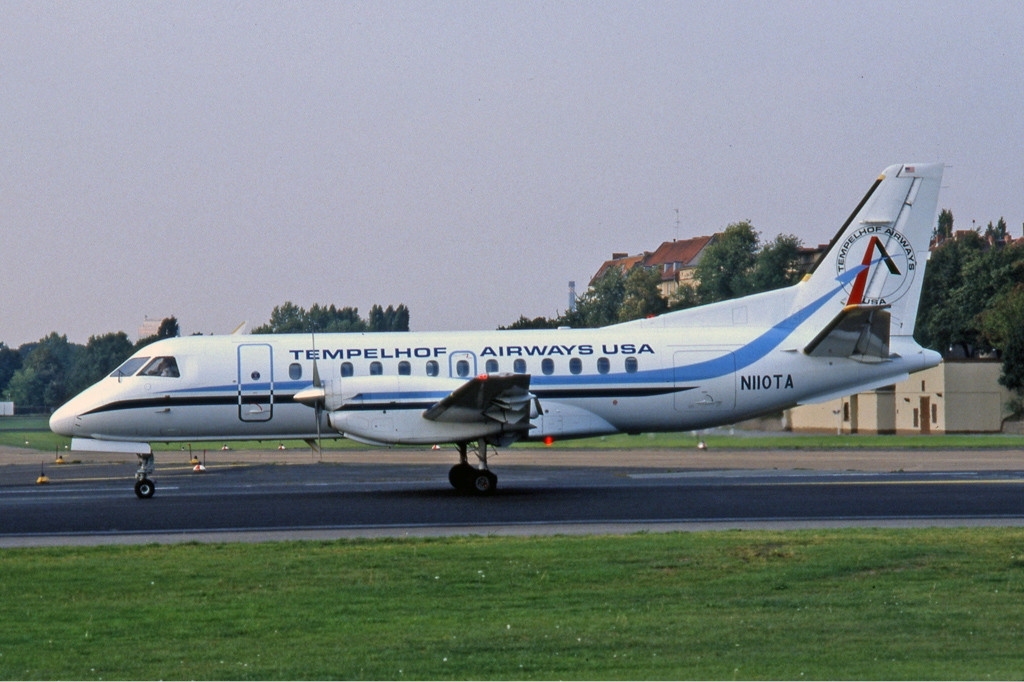
Tempelhof Airways USA Saab 340, 1989

- Piper Navajo
- Cessna 441
- Learjet 25
- Learjet 35
- Nord 262A
- Saab 340A

== See also ==
- List of defunct airlines of Germany
- List of defunct airlines of the United States
