= Raisin Bombers =

Name given by Berliners to the Western Allied transport aircraft

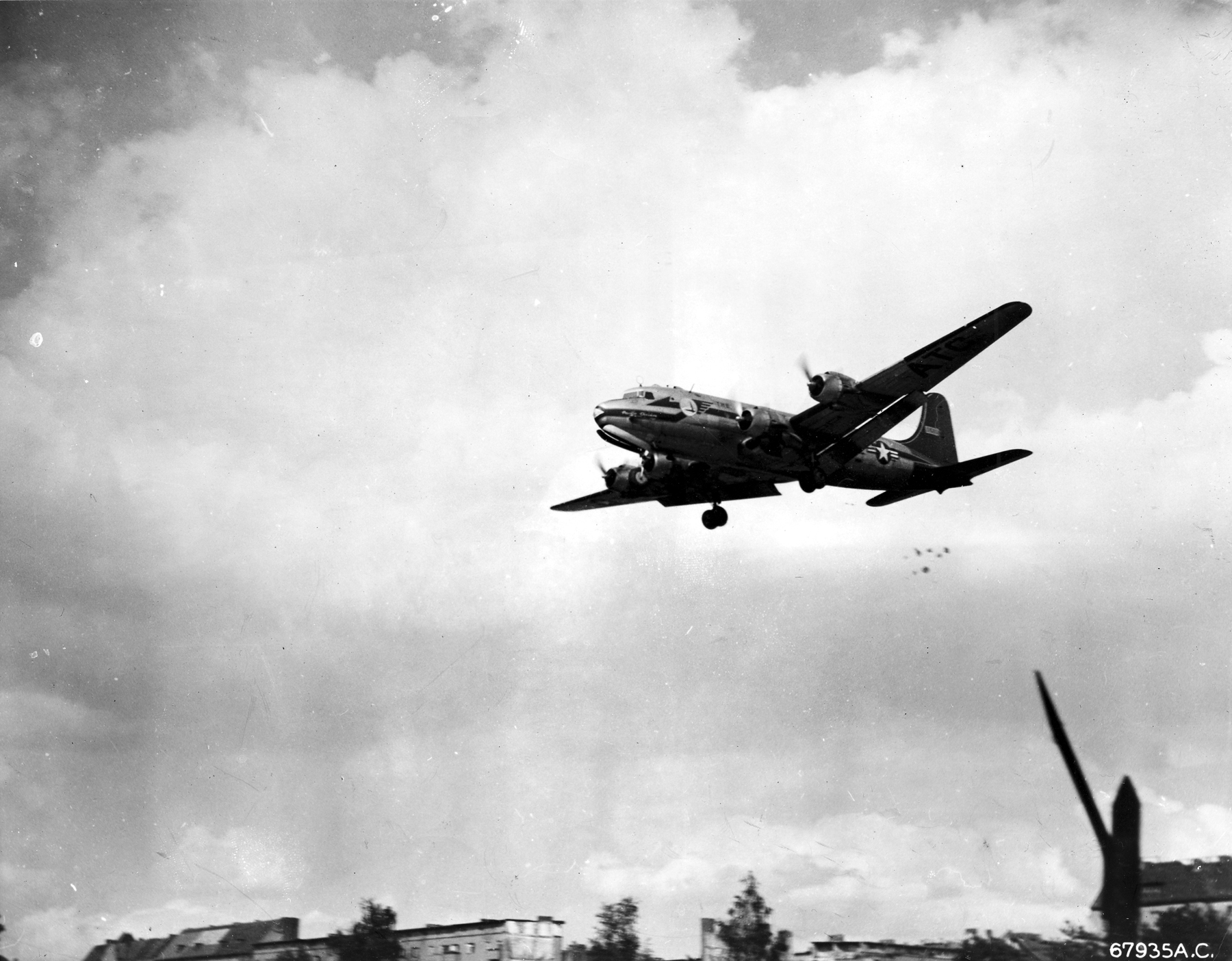
Douglas C-54 Skymaster dropping candy during Berlin Airlift, c. 1948/49

Raisin Bombers (German: Rosinenbomber) was the colloquial name given by Berliners to the Western Allied (American and British) transport aircraft which brought in supplies by airlift to West Berlin during the Soviet Berlin Blockade in 1948/1949. In American English, they were called Candy Bombers.

== History ==
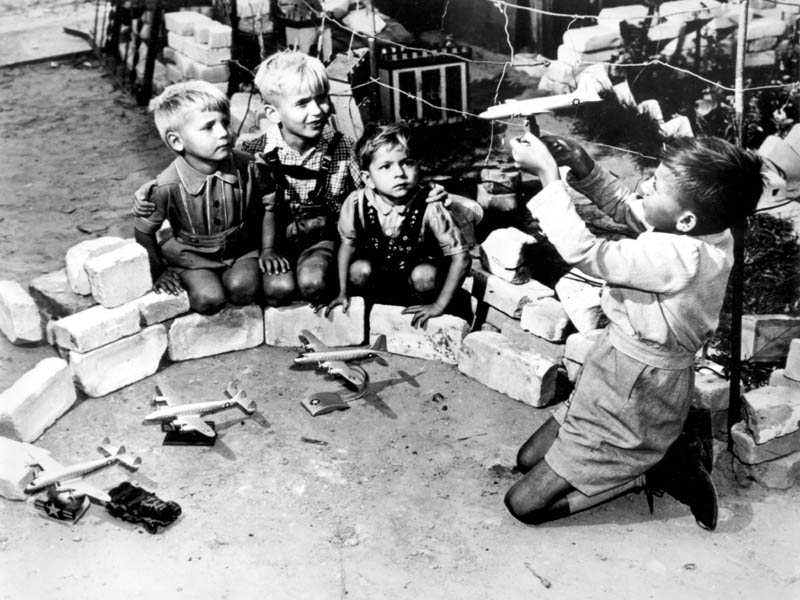
Berlin children playing airlift game, c. 1948/49

The idea for the candy drops originated with then First Lieutenant Gail Halvorsen upon a trip to Berlin’s Tempelhof Airport gifting two sticks of gum to children who had gathered at the fence, promising to bring more in the future. Upon being asked how they would know it was his flight he said he would wiggle his wings on approach to the airport. Upon the next flight into Tempelhof his aircraft released several candy bars using handkerchiefs as impromptu parachutes. Despite the fact that at the time it was a violation of Air Force regulations the drops were permitted to continue due to the fact that newspapers throughout Berlin had already begun reporting on the drops. The drops would go on to be dubbed “Operation Little Vittles” by Lt. General William H. Tunner, the Commander of the Berlin Airlift. Soon after more pilots began participating in the candy drops with the American Confectioners Association and children in the United States joining in on getting candy and handkerchiefs together. As a result of Operation Little Vittles dozens of pilots had dropped roughly 21 tons of chocolate from about 250,000 parachutes.

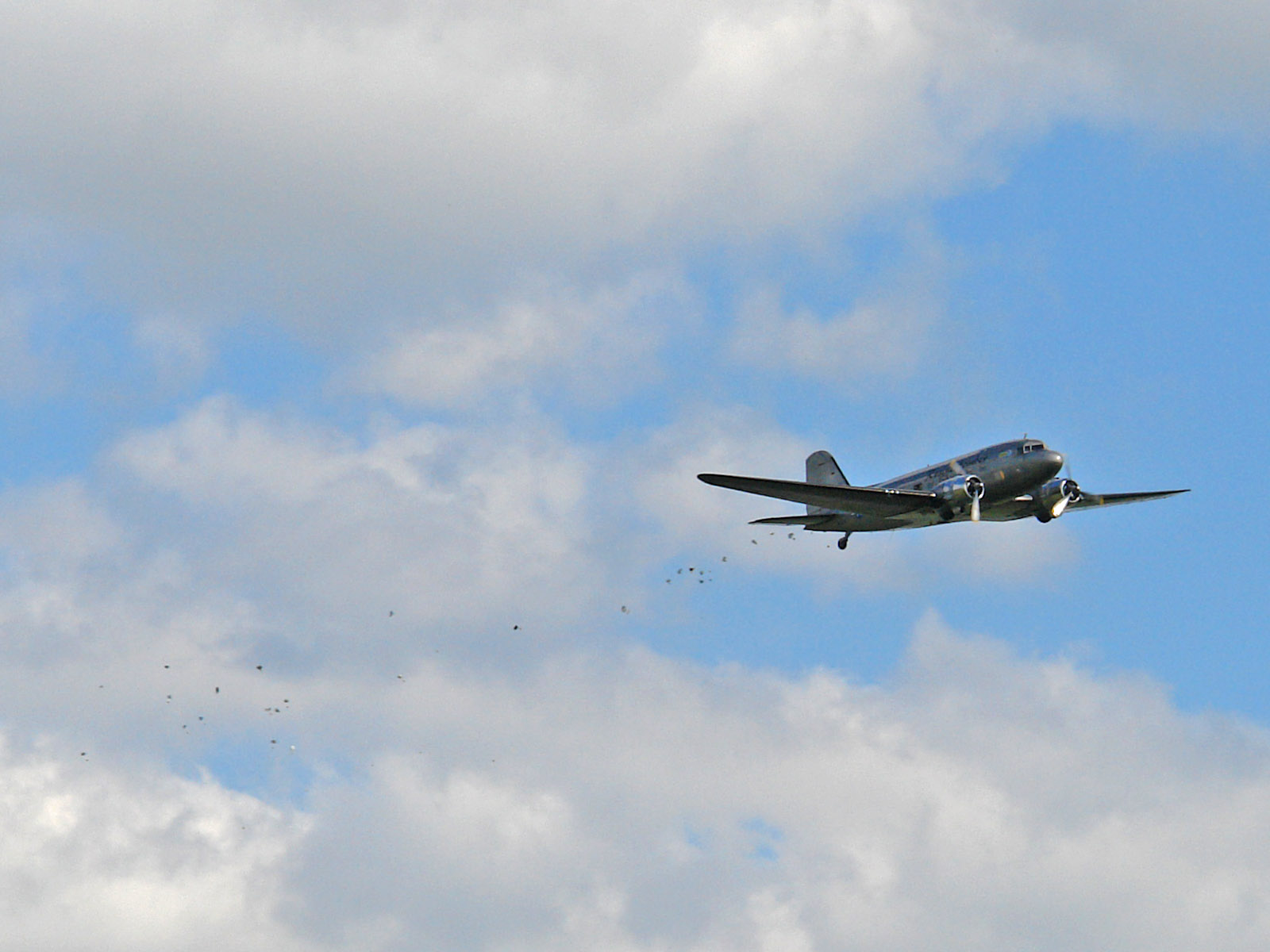
Gail Halvorsen in a Douglas C-47 Skytrain does a "Candy Drop" over Tempelhof Airport in honour of the 60th anniversary of the end of the Berlin Blockade, 2009

Today the name Rosinenbomber is commonly applied to several historic types of military aircraft involved in the Berlin Airlift, foremost the four-engined Douglas C-54 Skymaster and the twin-engined Douglas C-47 Skytrain.

== See also ==
- Marshall Plan
- History of Berlin
