= Wetland (disambiguation) =

A wetland is an area of land whose soil is saturated with moisture either permanently or seasonally. For specific wetland types see bog, marsh and swamp.

Wetlands may refer to:

- Wetlands (novel), a German erotic novel by Charlotte Roche
- Wetlands (video game)
- Wetlands Preserve, a defunct New York City music venue
- Wetlands (2011 film), a French Canadian film
- Wetlands (2013 film), a German film
- Wetlands (2017 film), an American film
- Wetland (film), a 2021 Spanish thriller film
- Wetlands, an academic journal published by the Society of Wetland Scientists
