= Kreuzberg (Tempelhofer Berge) =

Hill in Kreuzberg, Berlin, Germany

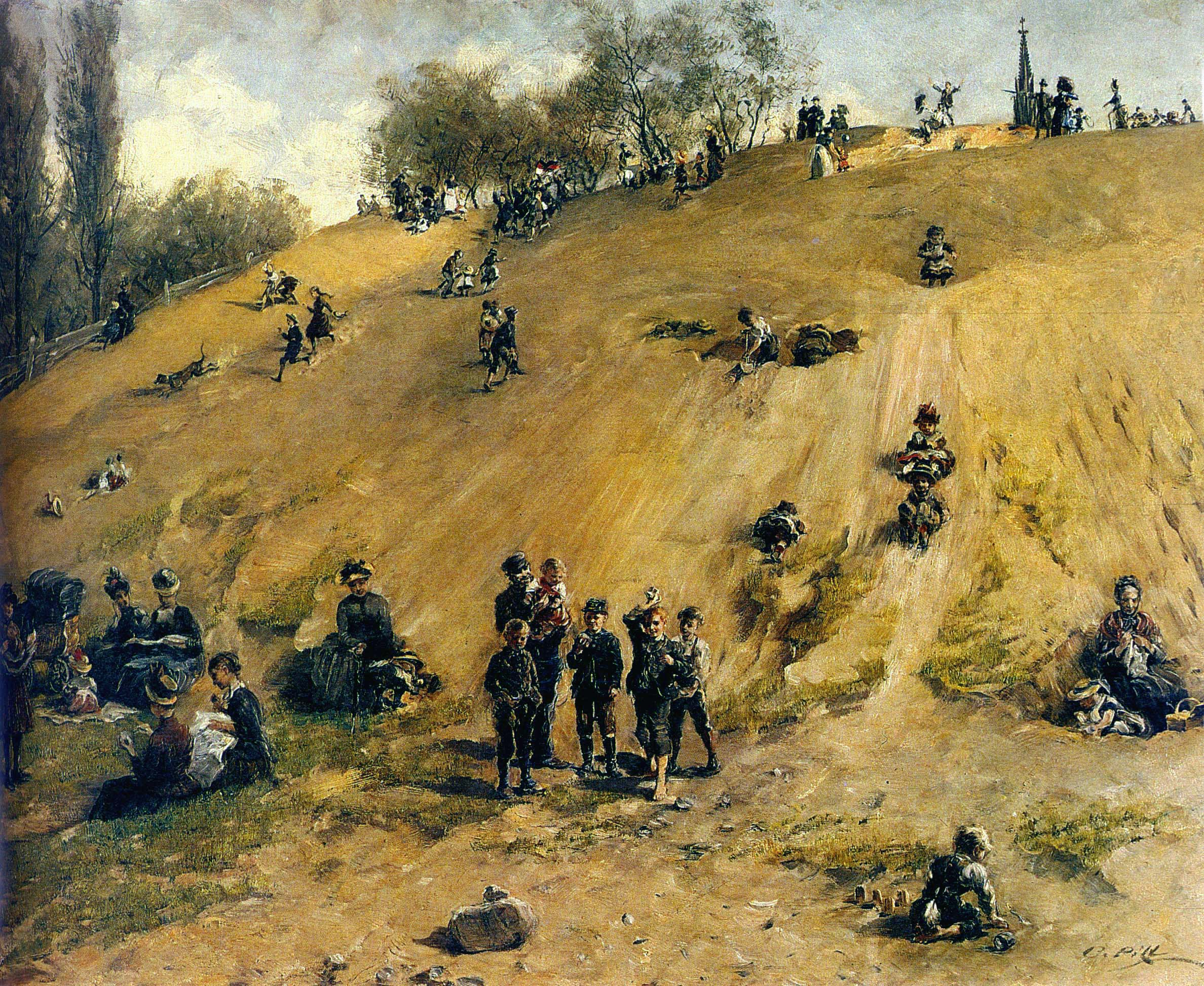
- The Kreuzberg, seen from northwest in 1886, painting by Otto Piltz

Highest point
- Elevation: 66 m (217 ft)
- Coordinates: 52°29′15″N 13°22′53″E

Naming
- English translation: Cross mountain
- Language of name: German

Geography
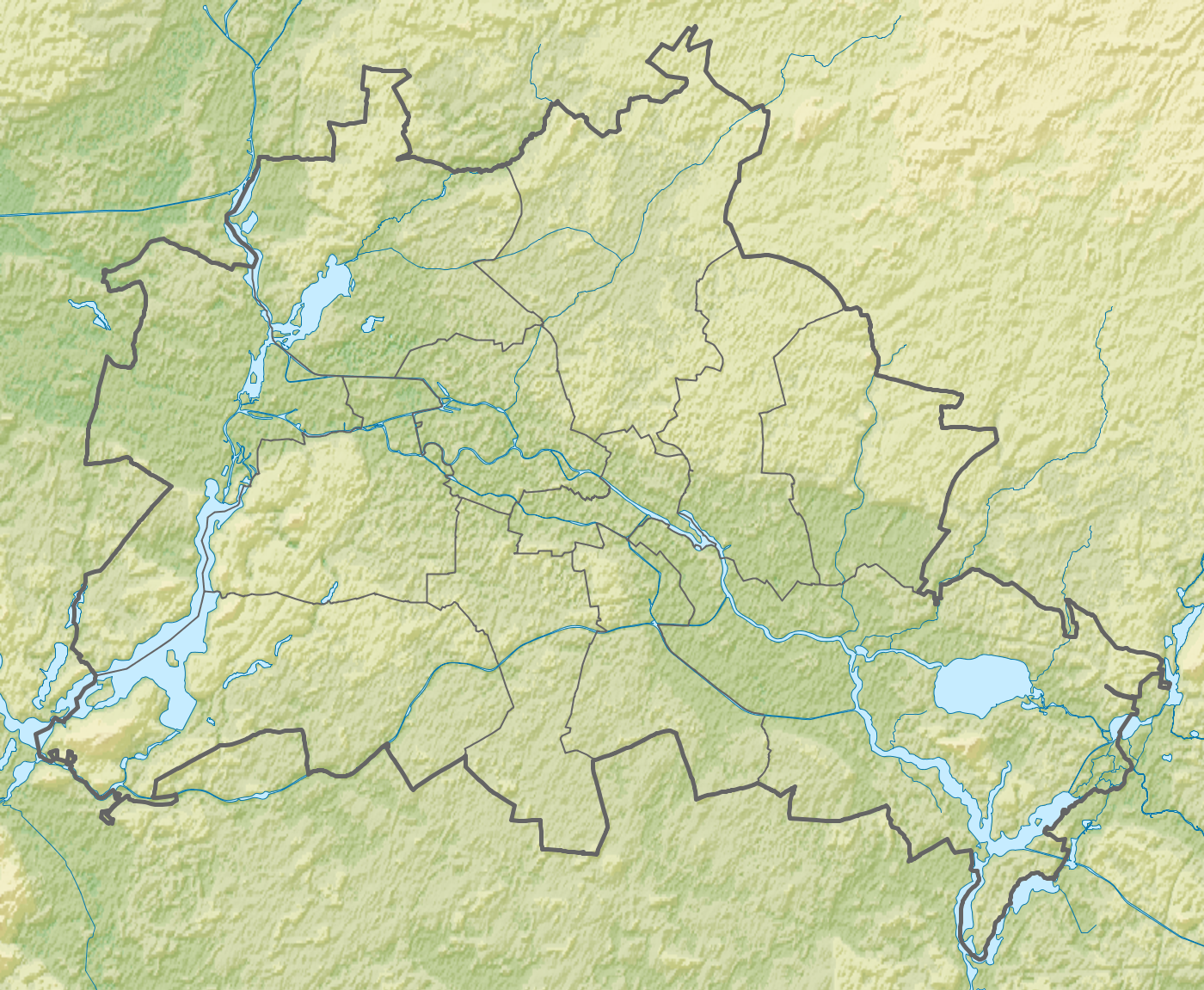
- Location within Berlin
- Location: Berlin, Germany

The Kreuzberg is a hill in the Kreuzberg locality of Berlin, Germany, in former West Berlin. It rises about 66 m (217 ft) above the sea level. It was named by King Frederick William III of Prussia after the Iron Cross which crowns the top of the Prussian National Monument for the Liberation Wars, designed by Karl Friedrich Schinkel, on its inauguration on 30 March 1821. On 27 September 1921 the borough assembly of the VIth borough of Berlin decided to name the borough after the hill. The borough was subsequently downgraded to a locality in 2001.

== Other names for the hill ==
Former names of the Kreuzberg were Sandberg (sand mountain), Runder Berg (1524) or Runder Weinberg (Round Mountain or Round Wine Mountain/Vineyard), Tempelhofer Berg and corrupted Templower Berg (both Tempelhof Mountain), Götzens Berg (1798) or Götzescher Berg (1818; both Götze's Mountain), Kreutzberg (1822, 1834) and Kreuzberg (1856). Since the 1850s the hill was also nicknamed Monte Cruce or Monte Croce.

== Geology ==
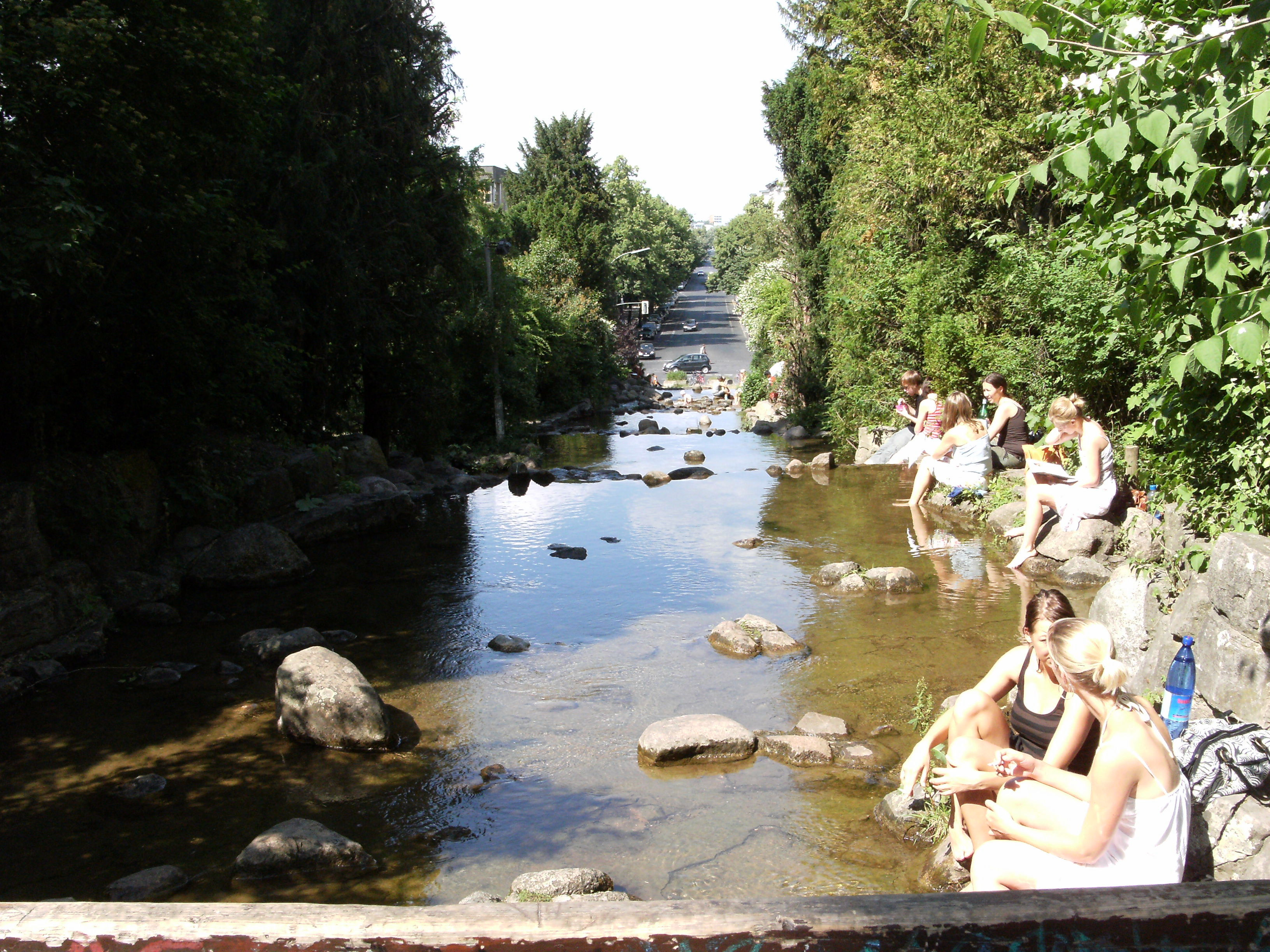
The manmade waterfall at the Viktoriapark, going down from the Kreuzberg.

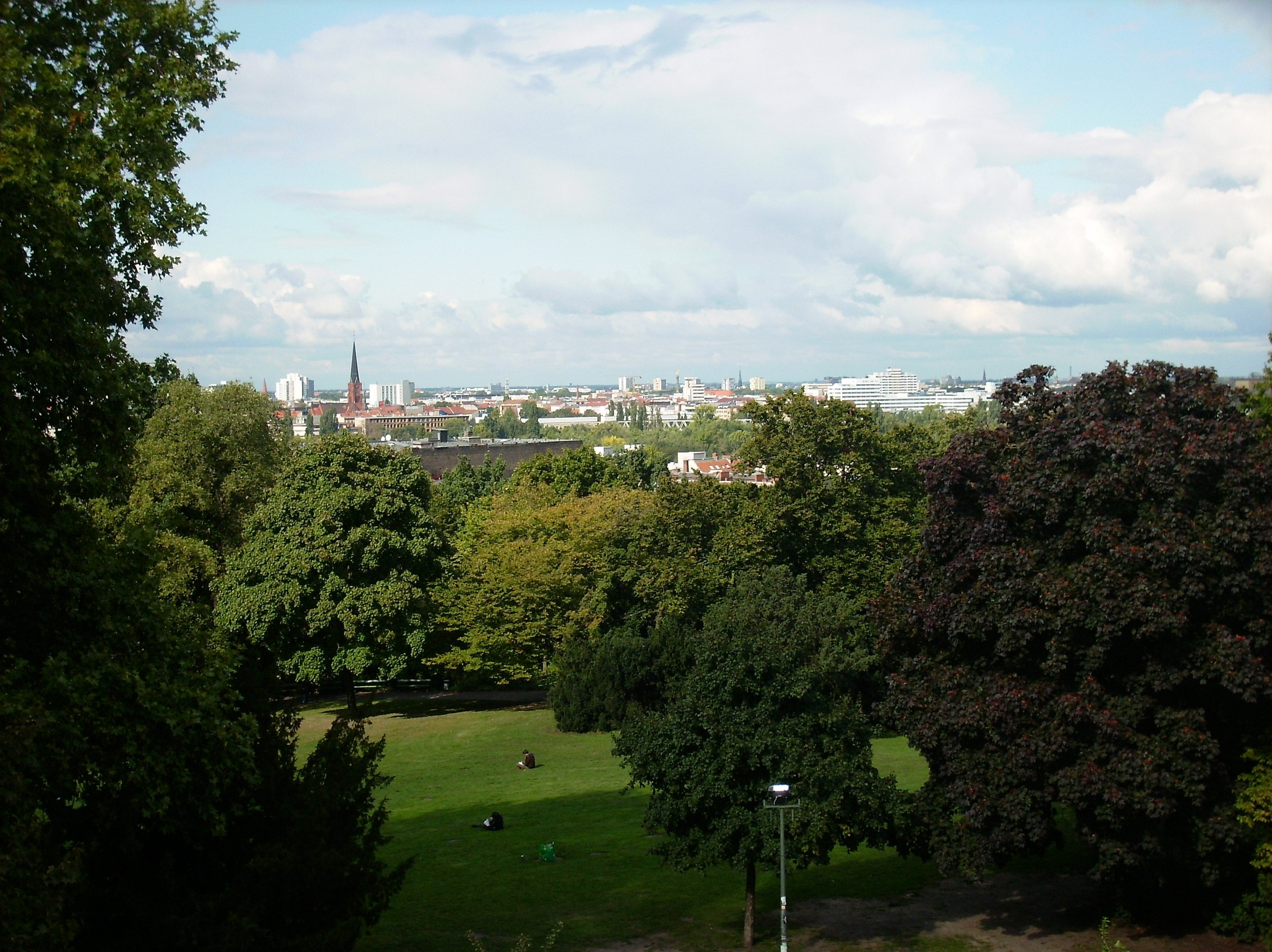
View on Berlin from Kreuzberg's National monument for the Liberation Wars.

The Kreuzberg is a natural hill and forms part of the Tempelhofer Berge range (Tempelhof hills) stretching along the northern descent of the Teltow Plateau between Schöneberg and the Rollberge in Neukölln. It rises about 66 m (217 ft) above the sea level and 32 m (105 ft) above the northerly adjacent Berlin-Warsaw glacial valley. The Teltow Plateau is a flatly undulating ground moraine landscape. The Kreuzberg's relatively steep northern slope derives from the erosion by meltwater running into the Berlin-Warsaw glacial valley, when it was formed by the Weichselian glaciation. The Berlin-Warsaw glacial valley stretches to 5 km (3.1 mi) between the southern Kreuzberg and the northern Prenzlauer Berg, thus forming here the narrowest point between the northerly Barnim Plateau and southern Teltow Plateau.

== History ==
The oldest surviving record mentioning the Kreuzberg is a deed of gift of 1290, by which Knight Jacob of Nybede (Jakob von Nybede/Niebede) from the Knights Templar commandry in Tempelhof donated the Berlin Franciscans a brick bakery and a loam pit on the northerly slope of the Kreuzberg. At road constructions in the Methfesselstraße in the 1830s workers discovered under the roots of a felled tree the remnants of a mediaeval brick bakery, probably the premise where the bricks for Berlin's Franciscan Cloister Church (Franziskaner-Klosterkirche) have been manufactured.

The Kreuzberg, as well as the fields and farmland north and south of it used to belong to the village land of Tempelhof, a fief first held by the Knights Templar and with their suppression in 1312, Margrave Waldemar the Great enfeoffed it to the Knights Hospitallers of St. John in 1318. On 23 September 1435 Order Master Balthasar von Schlieben of the Knights Hospitaller sold – among others – the Kreuzberg to Berlin-Cölln.

After the subjection of Cölln and neighbouring Berlin by the new Hohenzollern Prince-Elector Frederick Irontooth of Brandenburg in 1442/1448, and his abolition of their union and semi-autonomy, he seized Cölln's feudal seniority over the Kreuzberg and the surrounding area in his favour. However, the prince-elector soon later sold the vineyards on the slope east of the houses on today's Heimstraße to private owners, mostly Cölln burghers, but kept those west of it including the Kreuzberg.

On 15 July 1524 Prince-Elector Joachim I Nestor and his entourage fled to the top of the Kreuzberg (then called Runder Berg), the highest of the Tempelhofer Berge, in order to survive a flood predicted for that day by his court astronomer Johann Carion. After spending much of the day on the Kreuzberg in vain, at about 16:00 h, Electress Elizabeth of Denmark urged her husband to leave. They returned to town, where a thunderstorm started and a lightning killed four horses and the coachmen. According to another source the news of their frightful flight had spread among the Cöllners and Berliners, many of whom had tried to get as well onto the Kreuzberg, but were kept out by electoral guards. On their return the crowd awaited the elector and his entourage and welcoming him laughing.

In 1553 Joachim I Nestor ordered to plant vines on the slopes, in the private parcels on the slope as well as on the electoral slopes. He employed vintners, called wine masters, each responsible for a vineyard of a certain size, giving the name Weinmeisterweg (Winemaster Way, today's Kreuzbergstraße at the northern foot of the Kreuzberg). In 1588 the financial chamber of the city of Cölln recorded for one of the vineyards an output of 13 and a half tons of red and white wine, amounting to 35 threescore and 45 groats. For 1595 Cölln's financial chamber accounted for the sale of 36 tuns of wine for 144 rixdollars, partially exported to Poland-Lithuania, Saxony, and Sweden.

On 19 June 1631 King Gustavus Adolphus of Sweden captured the southerly adjacent Tempelhof Field, took the Tempelhofer Berge range and positioned cannons threatening to shoot Berlin and Cölln in order to force his brother-in-law Elector George William to support the Swedish efforts in the Thirty Years' War (1618–1648). The severe devastations and depopulation by the Thirty Years' War caused the death or flight of many a vintner, causing the neglect and abandonment of their vineyards. The slopes became deserted and turned into sandy wasteland.

In 1718 Elector Frederick William II of Brandenburg (as Frederick William I King in Prussia) sold the vineyards covered by today's Heimstraße and the hills west thereof, and it were mostly the electoral wine masters already employed on them, who bought them and continued viticulture. For 1720 a mulberry plantation is recorded, with their leaves needed for the etatist attempts to establish silk production in Brandenburg-Prussia. However, alternative usages of the slopes remained mostly successless, so many slopes became again deserted and turned into wasteland, some owners continued viticulture. Western German wine had meanwhile outdone the local competition.

On the Kreuzberg, like on some neighbouring hills, remained vineyards until 1739/1740, when a hefty frost killed most of the vine stock, among them Red Malvasian and Muscateller are recorded. In 1760 Austrian and Russian confederated troops under Tottleben defeated the defenders of Berlin on the Tempelhof Field and on 2 October posted their cannons on the Tempelhofer Berge shooting into Berlin. The city surrendered and the confederated troops occupied Berlin for four days between 9 and 12 October.

During the War of the Sixth Coalition against France, in 1813 Colonel Hermann von Boyen prompted to work sconces south of Runder Berg (today's Kreuzberg) and the other hills of the Tempelhofer Berge range. Plantations of about 4,000 fruit trees were stubbed and levelled. Citizens of Berlin were draughted to work the sconces supervised by Captain Woldemar von Loos, among them also prominent figures such as Johann Gottlieb Fichte, August Wilhelm Iffland and Johann Gottfried Schadow. On top of the Kreuzberg, protected by the sconce on its southern slope, a redoubt was built comprising seven bomb-safe powder magazines, two huts for altogether 500 men, officially called the Citadel of Berlin.

Alone on the Kreuzberg 20 cannons were put up directing towards the approaching French Armée de Berlin under Oudinot. However, with the Allied Northern Army under Crown Prince Charles XIV John of Sweden defeating the French already in the Battle of Großbeeren on 23 August, the sconce was never used for defence and was later called Lärmkanonenschanze (noise cannon sconce). Already in September 1813 the sloppily constructed huts of the citadel collapsed.

After negotiations on 27 August 1818 the merchant Gottfried Wilhelm August Tietz, the farming burgher Johann Friedrich Götze and Christian Weimar (Weymann) sold the top of the Kreuzberg (then called Götze'scher Berg, i.e. Götze's mountain) measuring 1.5 Prussian Morgen (2,839.83 m^{2} (30,567.7 sq ft)) and land for an access path. On 4 September 1818 King Frederick William III of Prussia approved the stipulated price of thalers 1,100 and an additional 400 as compensation for fixtures lost through the fortification works in 1813. The semi-circular original access path, measuring a width of 20 Prussian feet (6.3 m (21 ft)), and branching off Methfesselstraße, was already under construction at that time. The adjacent land, measuring 72 Morgen (18.38 ha (45.4 acres)), remained property of Götze, Tietz and Weimar. In June 1820 the Lärmkanonenschanze was levelled again.

For 19 September 1818 Duke Charles of Mecklenburg arranged the laying of the foundation stone for the war memorial projected for the top of the Kreuzberg and designed by Karl Friedrich Schinkel. However, the walls and moats of the sconces and the redoubt could not be completely levelled until the ceremony, so that scaffoldings were erected, allowing to overlook the remnants of the so-called citadel. Masons laid a brick structure up to the level of the scaffoldings so that the foundation stone was to be laid on top of this structure, with the ground level around only later to be elevated to the same height. The laying of the foundation stone was attended - among others - by the king, Tzar Alexander I, Christian Daniel Rauch and Schinkel.

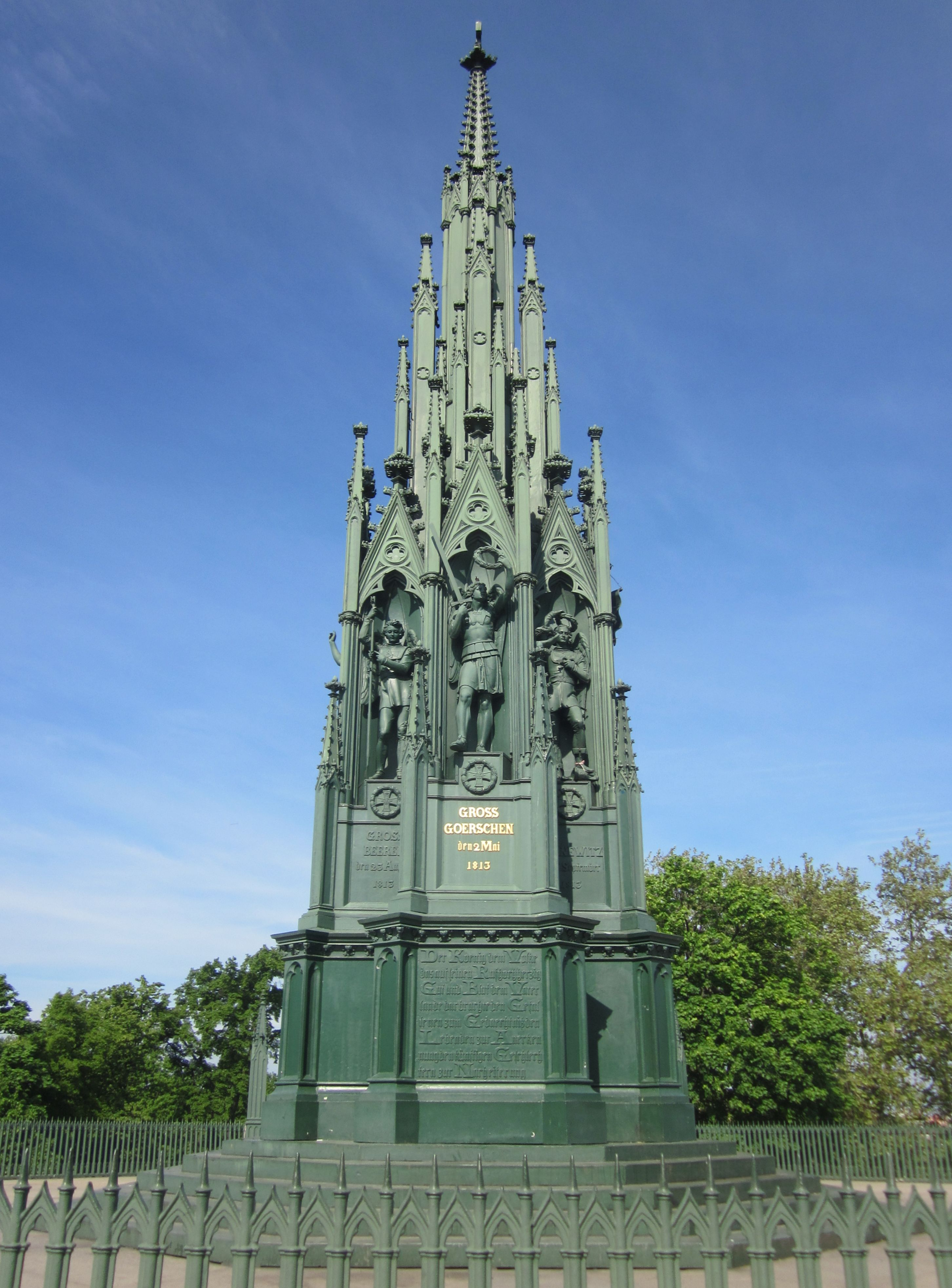
Prussian National Monument for the Liberation Wars

For the inauguration of the Prussian National Monument for the Liberation Wars Frederick William III chose the 30 March 1821, the seventh anniversary of the conquest of the Montmartre in the Battle of Paris. The inauguration was attended by the royal family, the Prussian generality, the senior pastors of all Protestant congregations of Berlin, and as guests by Grand Duke Nicholas of Russia and his wife Alexandra Feodorovna (Charlotte of Prussia), as well as by thousands of other spectators. As the national monument is crowned by an Iron Cross the king renamed Götze'scher Berg into Kreuzberg (i.e. cross hill) on the occasion of the inauguration of the monument.

A bit northeast of the hill's top, deeper on the slope thus not blocking the view, a guard's house was erected after Schinkel's design in 1821. It was a brick structure in Gothic Revival style adorned with a Lombard band all around beneath the eaves of the flat pyramidal roof. On 1 January 1822 the invalid Martin Herborn moved in, employed to guard the monument. In 1822 the Götze family still lived at the foot of the Kreuzberg in a farm later replaced by the houses Kreuzbergstraße 76 and 75.

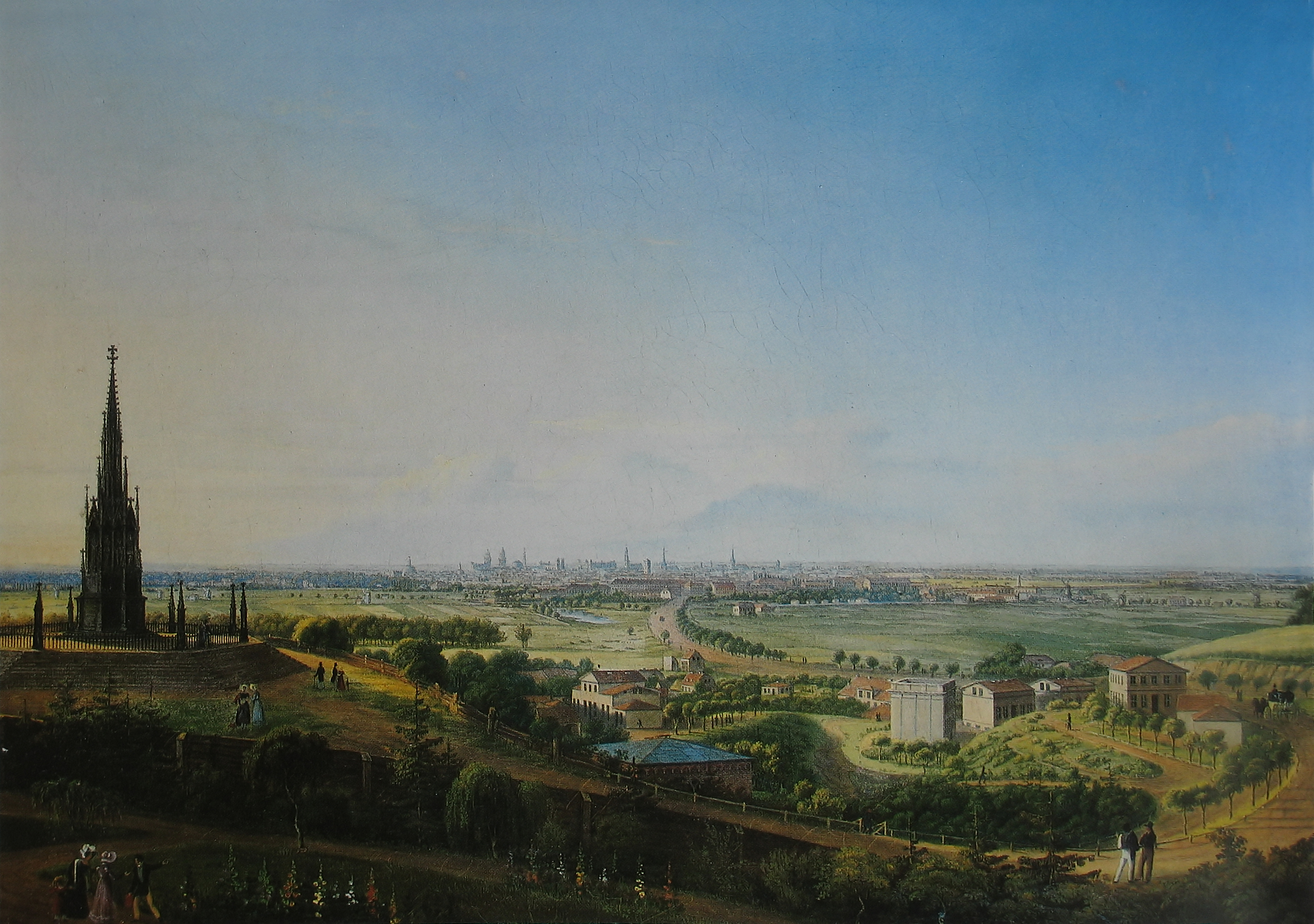
View in 1829 from Kreuzberg down the slope of the Teltow Plateau over what is today's Tempelhofer Vorstadt, in the lower centre the greyish-turquoise pyramidal roof of the guard's house.

In the late 1820s the Geri(c)ke brothers bought the triangular site on the eastern slope of Kreuzberg, an exploited sand pit, between the former road to Teltow, the Halle highway and Colonnenweg (today's Dudenstraße) preparing a colony of villas there, later called Wilhelmshöhe. In 1829 the Gericke brothers further opened the amusement park named Tivoli, after the Parisian example, on the site of the levelled noise cannon sconce on the southern slope of the Kreuzberg, offering among others the so-called Russische Rutschbahn, a circular roller coaster running over hill and dale. By 1834 a new sand pit had opened further west at the site of today's waterfall in the Victoria Park.

In 1837 the bankrupted Tivoli on the Kreuzberg was put up for public auction. The purchasers sold it on to Mr. Siegmund, who reopened the Tivoli with a two-storey ballroom in 1841, only to bankrupt again the year after. The Kreuzberg and the neighbouring hills, then still part of the Tempelhof municipality, were popular sites for excursions, because of the beautiful sight onto Berlin, but also because of the beer gardens and inns which already allowed smoking, since within Berlin's city boundaries the royal police had forbidden smoking in the public. After March Revolution of 1848 the royal government and its police had to reduce their authoritarianism and left smoking to everybody's own discretion. On 6 August 1848 people gathered at the monument demonstrating for the unification of Germany, rendering homage to Archduke John of Austria as regent of the to-be-unified Empire, flagging the monument with the union tricolour of Black-Red-Gold, much opposed by the various Prussian nationalist formations.

The Tivoli burnt down after several further bankruptcies in 1856. Its name lived on in the brewery of the Berliner Brauereigesellschaft Tivoli (Berlin Brewery Company of Tivoli), built by Gustav Junghahn on the site of the former amusement park between 1857 and 1859.

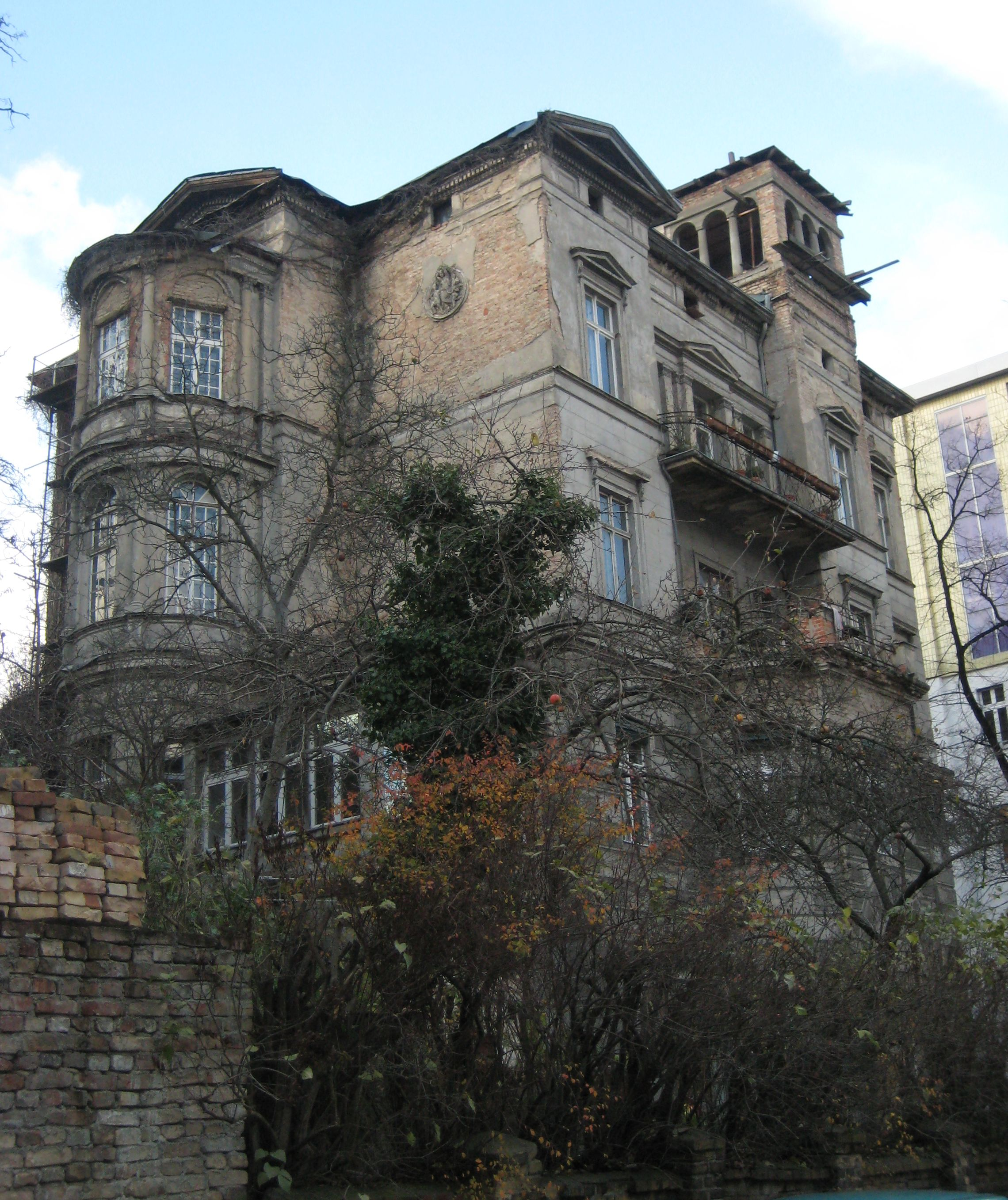
Lindenberg House, seen from the steep eastern slope of the Kreuzberg, and at the right, truncated though, the yellow Villa.

In 1871 22 families founded the Villen-Sozietät Wilhelmshöhe, an association to develop a neighbourhood of villas on the eastern slope of the Kreuzberg. At the eastern slope, partially quite steep due to an exploited sand pit there, a little dead end was laid out named Wilhelmshöhe after Wilhelmshöhe Palace. Forty villas were planned, but only twenty were realised, since the area dropped in the favour of the better-off, when the urbanisation caused the adjacent quarters to be built up with blocks of flats. Four villas weathered the times, however, two of them overformed by later extensions alienating their original design. Lindenberg House, on Methfesselstraße 23–25 by Ewald Becher in 1874, is one of the villas in original design, however, dilapidated. It is - among others - the domicile of the house of literature, venue and organiser of readings named Lettrétage since 2006.

In 1878 Johann Wilhelm Schwedler carried out Johann Heinrich Strack's plans to elevate and turn the monument by 21° with its front into the axis of the Großbeerenstraße, before it was set to rest on its new 8 m high (26 ft) socket building. In 1879 Guido von Madai, president of the royal police, decreed a maximum height of buildings in the adjacent streets to uphold the visibility of the monument on the Kreuzberg. The ordinance, however, was annulled by the groundbreaking 1882 "Kreuzberg judgement" of the Prussian Royal administrative court, stating that the police had exceeded its authority to ensure public security. On 14 December 1887 the city of Berlin acquired 8.5 ha (21 acres) of unbuilt slopes of the Kreuzberg from several owners, mostly north and west of the monument, including the westerly adjacent, lower hill called Rühlensberg.

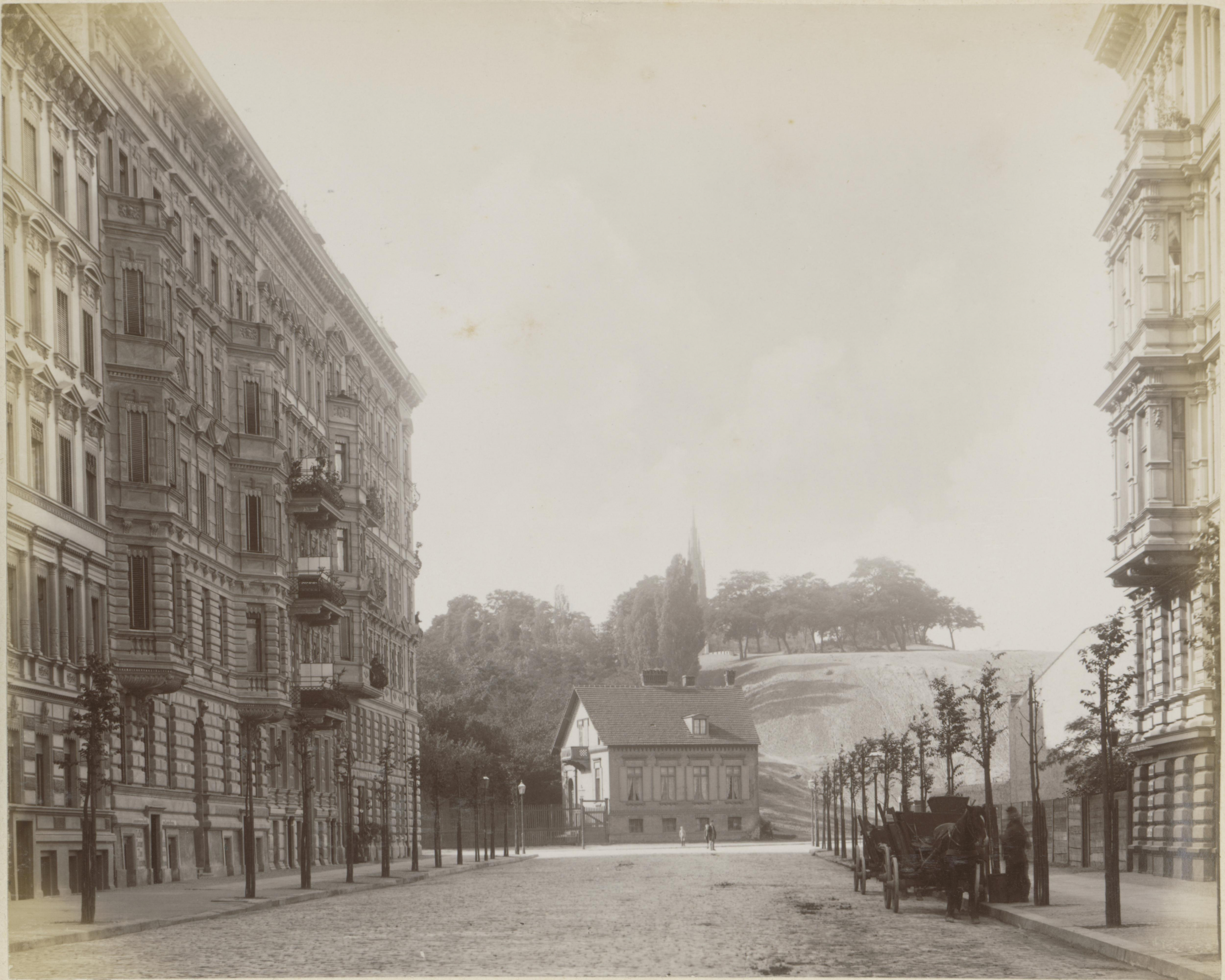
View southwards through Großbeerenstraße uphill the Kreuzberg; above in 1887, below in 2007

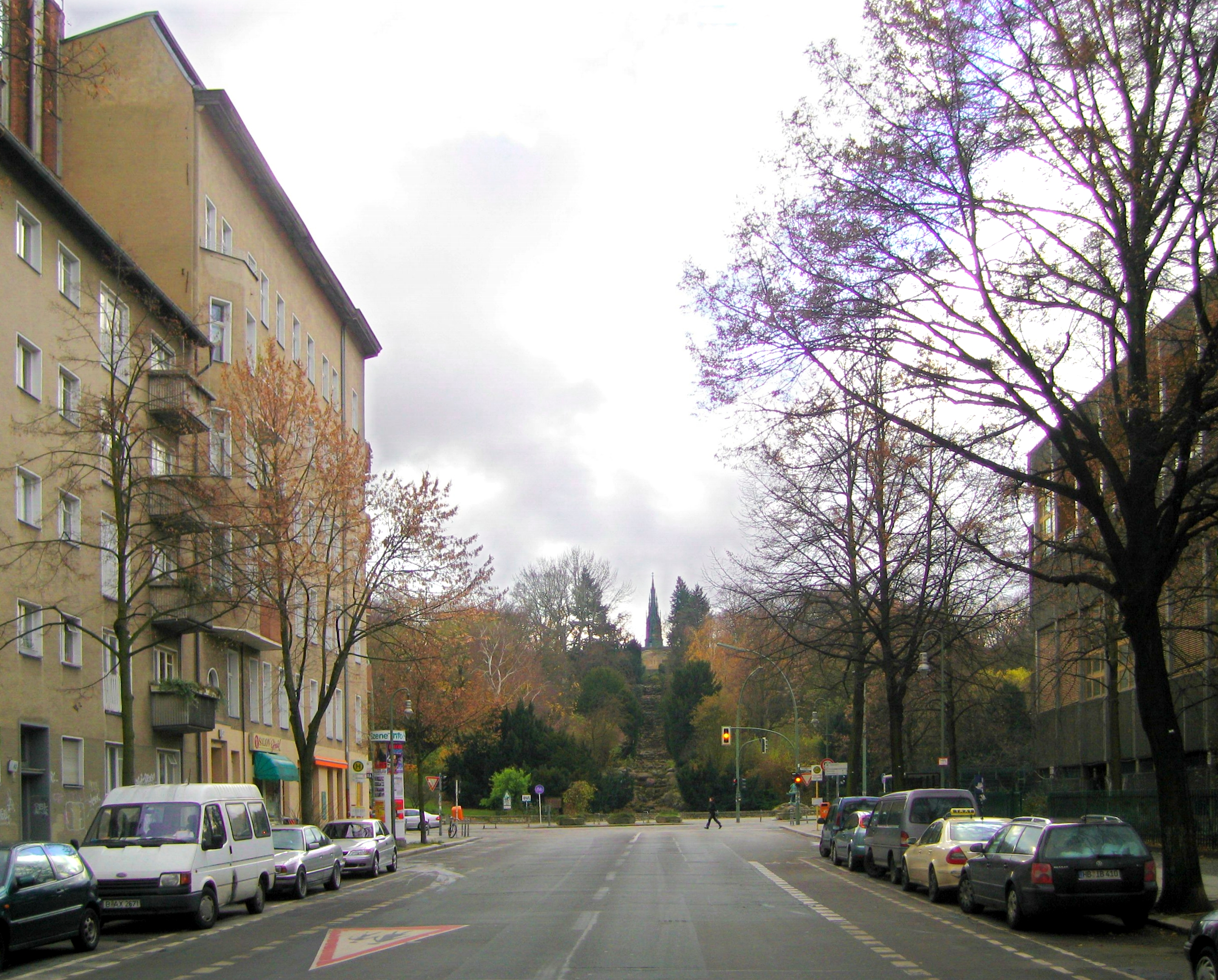

After 1889 a milk bar (Milchwirtschaft) moved into the Schinkel-designed former guard's house below the hill top, offering the milk drinking cures then popularised by Friedrich Grub. In 1891 Schultheiss-Bräu Actiengesellschaft, founded by Jobst Schultheiss in 1853 and by 1910 Europe's biggest brewery, bought Tivoli brewery on Kreuzberg's southern slope, making it its production department No. II. The eastern and northeastern slopes were built up with villas.

On 28 June 1888 Berlin's city parliament decided for City Garden Director Hermann Mächtig's design for a park on the acquired unbuilt slopes of Kreuzberg, including a waterfall between the monument on top of the Kreuzberg and the Großbeerenstraße. The park was named Victoria Park (Viktoriapark), in honour of Princess Victoria of Great Britain and Ireland, Prussian and German crown princess consort. Mächtig and the sculptor Albert Manthe travelled through the Giant Mountains visiting natural waterfalls to get inspired. Having returned Mächtig himself assisted by a confidant foreman started modelling and constructions for the park. For the waterfall Mächtig used pieces of rock from the Giant Mountains and boulders. The Wolfsschlucht (lit. wolf's gully) was designed into another exploited sand pit east of the hill top. Some built-up parcels on the southern side of Kreuzbergstraße had been bought and the houses there were demolished in order to include their plots into the park. In 1894 the Victoria Park opened.

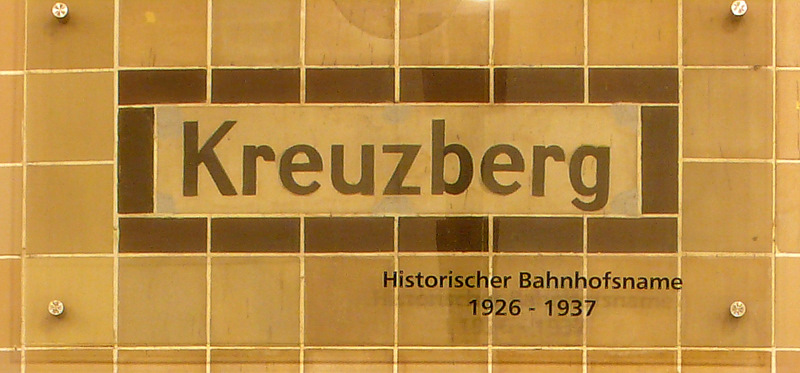
Historical name sign in the underground station of Platz der Luftbrücke

On 27 September 1921 the borough assembly of the VIth borough of Berlin, established on 1 October 1920 and provisionally named Hallesches Tor, decided to rename the borough after the hill into Kreuzberg. In 1926 the Kreuzberg underground station opened for traffic, renamed into Flughafen (i.e. airport) in 1937 (Platz der Luftbrücke since 1975).

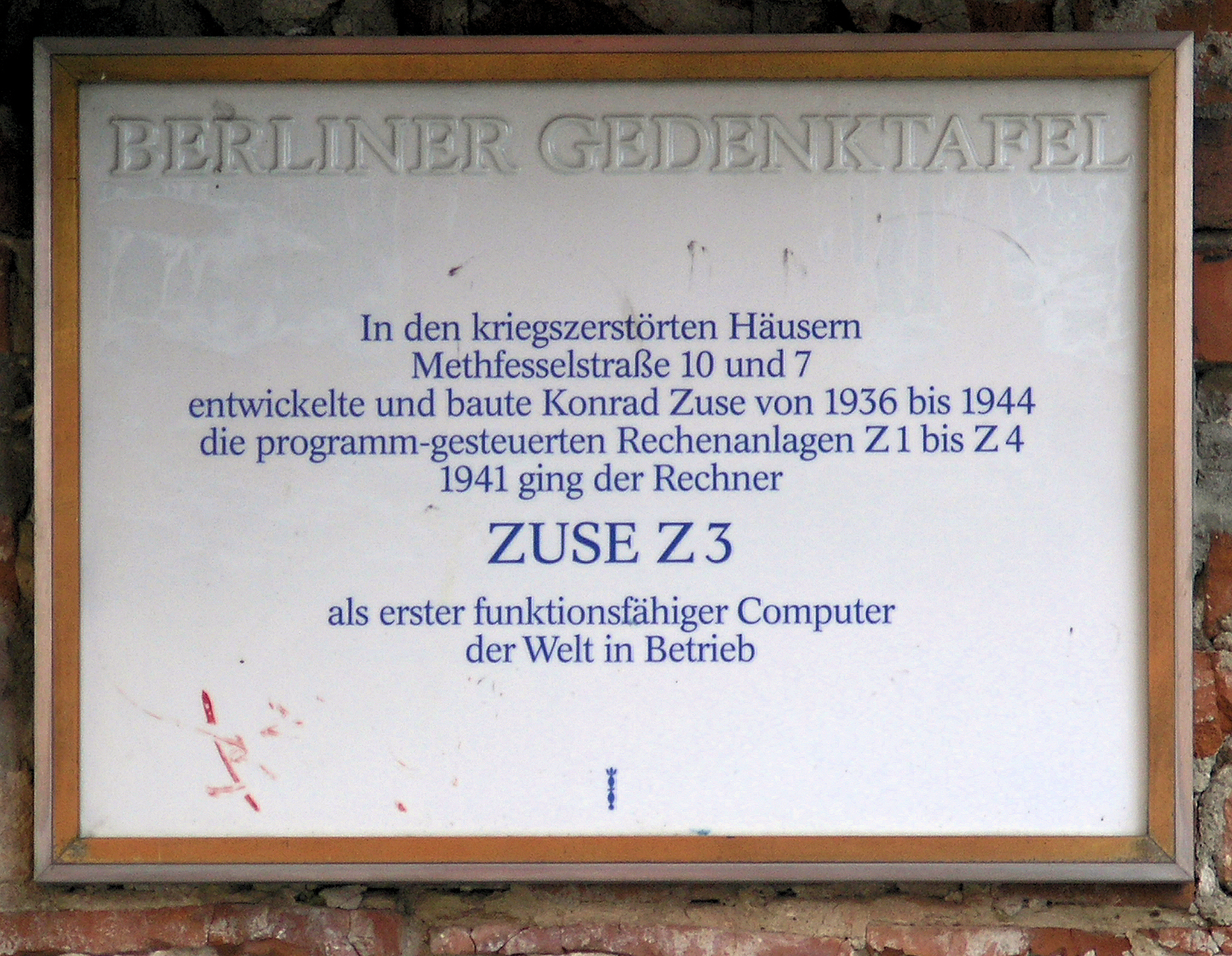
Memorial plaque on the ruin of Methfesselstraße 7 for Konrad Zuse constructing there and opposite in #10 the first computers.

Since 1935 Konrad Zuse experimented in the construction of computers in his parents' flat, moving with them into their new flat on Methfesselstraße 10, the street leading up the Kreuzberg. In September 1940 Zuse presented his experimental computer Z2, covering several rooms in the parental flat, to experts of the Deutsche Versuchsanstalt für Luftfahrt (DVL).

The DVL granted research subsidies so that in 1941 Zuse rented a workshop on the opposite side in Methfesselstraße 7 and stretching through the block to Belle-Alliance Straße 29 (renamed and renumbered as Mehringdamm 84 in 1947). On 12 May 1941 Zuse presented the world's first functioning computer, Z3 built in his workshop, to the public. While Z3 was destroyed with the workshop in an Allied Air raid in 1943 and the parental flat in the following year, the successor Z4 was constructed in a new premise in Oranienstraße 6 and evacuated from Berlin on 14 February 1945, only arriving in Göttingen two weeks later.

The Kreuzberg had been included in the Nazi plans for rebuilding Berlin into the Welthauptstadt Germania, but only preparations materialised. Ernst Sagebiel oriented his Tempelhof Airport building towards the national monument on the Kreuzberg so that the central hall's front on the forecourt of the airport and one edge of the monument's octagonal groundplan are parallel. The then planned axis consisting of a promenade and series of waterfalls cascading down the Kreuzberg hill towards the Platz der Luftbrücke was never realised, the interjacent block of houses remained untouched.

In summer 1944 the Organisation Todt, also employing Soviet forced labourers else held captive at Blücherplatz, started driving five tunnels into the northern slope of the Kreuzberg from Kreuzbergstraße. The semi-completed tunnels were meant and used as air-raid shelters, while constructions continued until February 1945. In 1944 British bombing left behind a wake of devastation leading from one block north up the Großbeerenstraße, over the waterfall to the monument, damaging its socket structure, destroying villas on the northeastern Kreuzberg slope, and blocks of flats along Methfesselstraße, including Zuse's parental flat. The abandoned Schinkel-designed guard's house, though undestroyed, was demolished in the 1950s, its site is now used by a ball playing cage.

In August 1952 Kreuzberg's borough mayor Willy Kressmann (SPD) inaugurated another monument on the Kreuzberg performing the form of a cross, Latin though. It is the Memorial for the eastern German Homeland (Mahnmal für die ostdeutsche Heimat), an 8 m high (26 ft) cross of pine wood with a crown of thorns of barbed wire, located on the upper edge of the Kreuzberg's sodded northwestern slope, and commemorating the deaths of 100,000s killed in atrocities, by forced labour or other maltreatment, and the fate of the surviving 12 million refugees and expellees from former eastern Germany and neighbouring foreign countries ruled after World War II by pro-Soviet governments.

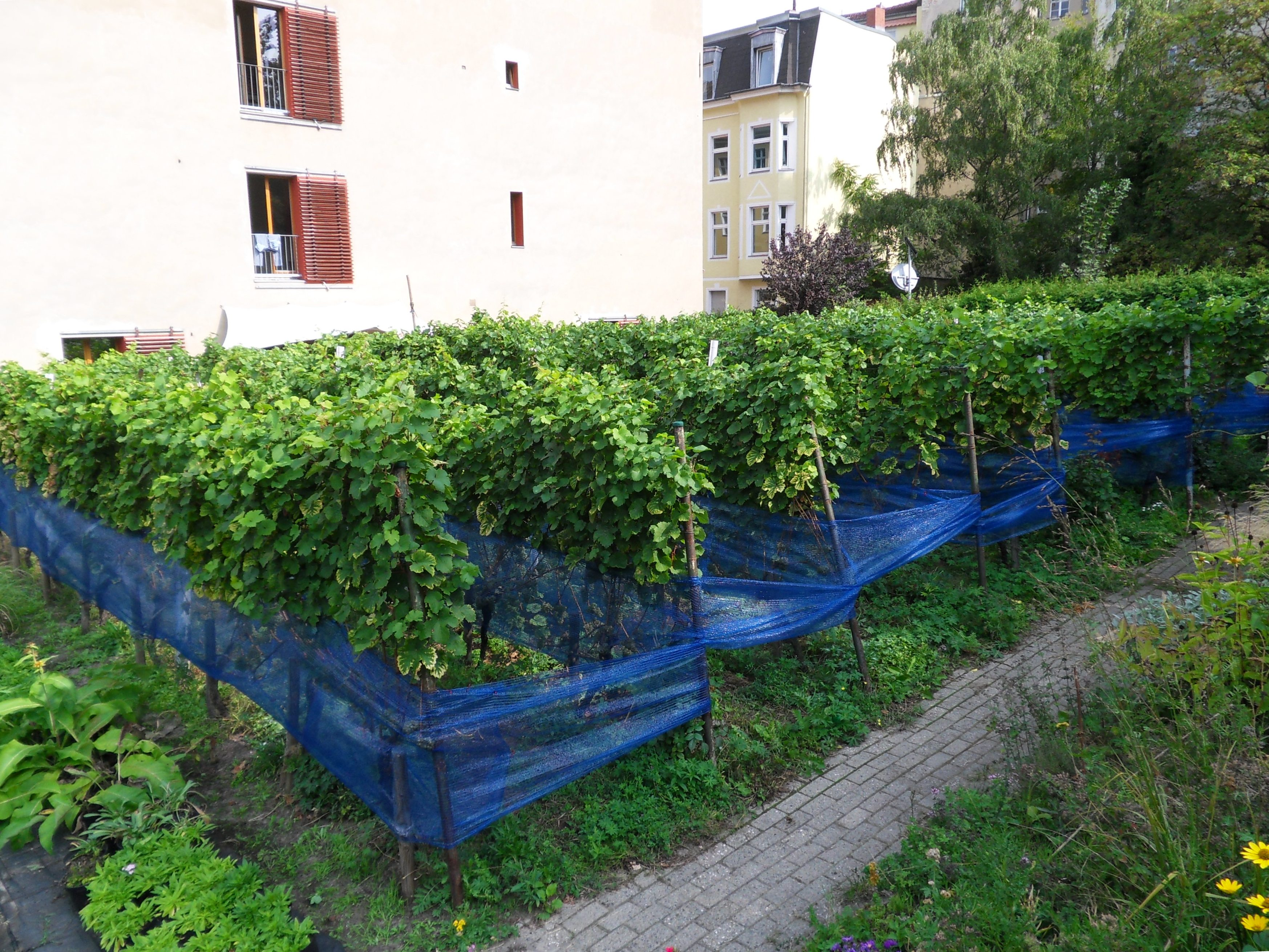
The municipal vineyard on Methfesselstraße 10 with the firewall of No. 8.

A historic wine-growing area, today the Kreuzberg is covered again by two small vineyards. One was founded in 1968 on the cleared site of Methfesselstraße 10, it is owned by the Borough of Friedrichshain-Kreuzberg, and cultivated by the adjacent market garden. The other, however, lacking authorisation to distribute its harvests as food, established in summer 2006 within the Victoria Quarter on the southern slope of the Kreuzberg. The vineyard on Methfesselstraße provides for the local "Kreuz-Neroberger" wine, gained from vines donated by Kreuzberg's twin towns Wiesbaden (1968) and Ingelheim am Rhein (1975), as well by the Bergstraße county (1971 and 1973) and from Bad Bergzabern (1985). About 600 bottles are pressed every year, not in Berlin, but in wineries in Mainz-Kostheim and Ingelheim.

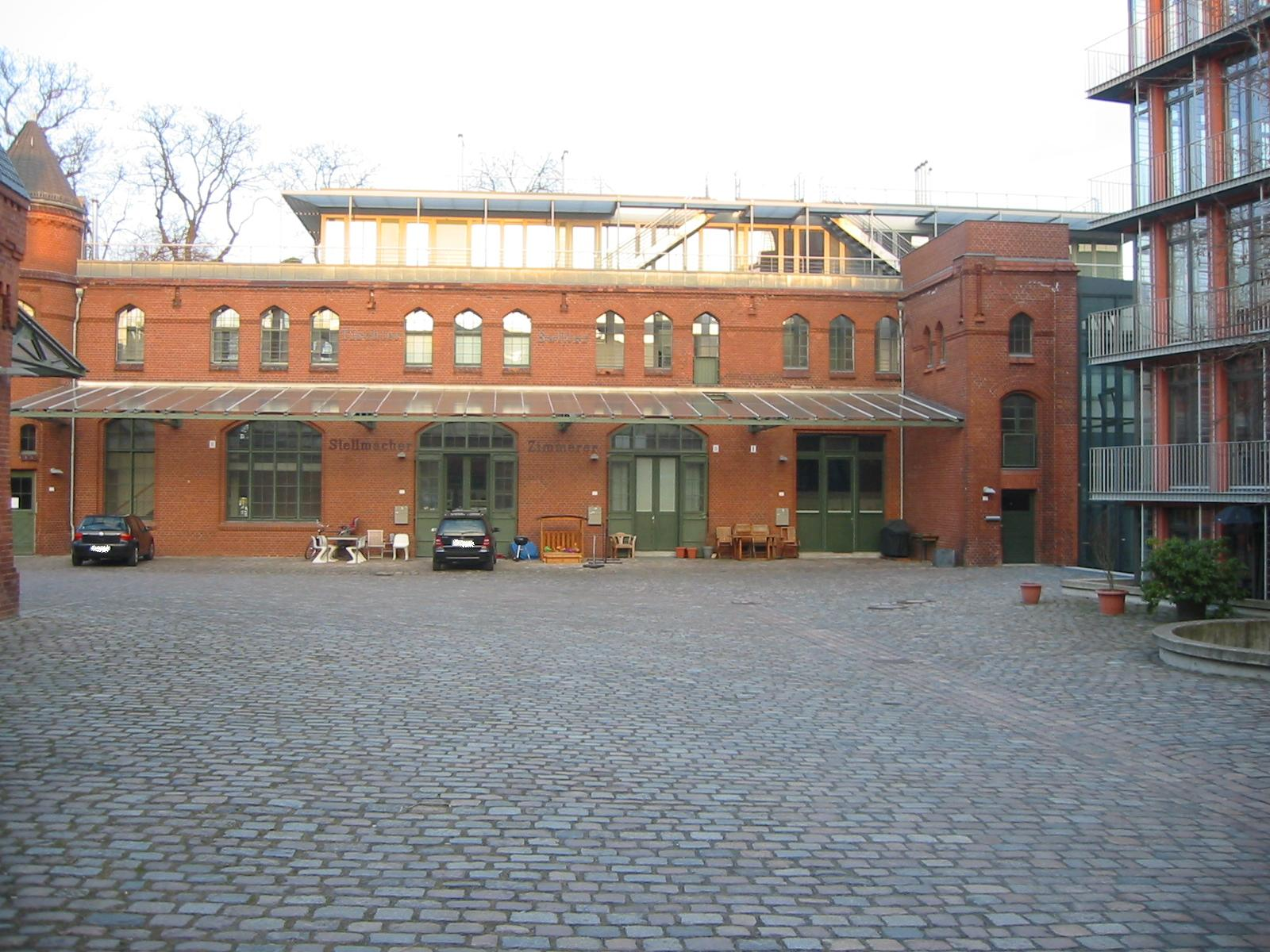
Victoria Quarter: The former workshops of cartwrights and carpenters of the brewery.

In 1994 the Schultheiss brewery, department II, ceased production. The brewery compound, with many excellent examples of industrial brick architecture, listed buildings, is since transformed into a new residential area called Viktoria-Quartier (Victoria Quarter).

The deformed villa of 1872 on Methfesselstraße 17–21, northerly neighbouring Lindenberg House, is called the yellow Villa (die gelbe Villa), after the tiles covering the building since its extensions in the 1950s and 1960s into an eight-storey private clinic (Klinik am Viktoriapark). Between 1927 and 1941 the villa was owned and inhabited by Wilhelm Lindemann, a then popular singer, musician and composer of operettas and drinking songs. After the clinic had closed in 1987 the building remained vacant for 14 years, before it was renovated and reopened in 2004. It is since a youth centre for education and creativity financed by a charitable foundation in Hamburg. The brick building of an abandoned public toilet on top of the hill was refurbished and in it opened as a little café (XBerg-Hütte) in 2011.
