= Lillian La France =

American stunt rider

- Born: Agnes Micek; 1894; Kansas, USA
- Died: May 8, 1979 (aged 84–85)
- Other names: Agnes Micek (name at birth)
- Occupation: Motorcycle stunt rider
- Known for: Wall of Death

Lillian La France (1894–1979) was billed as the world's foremost woman motorcycle stunt rider, one of a handful of female stunt riders in the 1920s and 1930s.

Born Agnes Micek in Kansas, USA and billed as "The Girl Who Flirts With Death", La France started riding the Wall of Death carnival sideshow and motordrome in 1924 at the age of 30. She used a 'skull and crossbones' logo, and was skilled at riding motorcycles and driving four wheel vehicles, and was the first person to ride a wall in a scaled down midget racing car. She was one of the first and most popular female wall of death riders of the 1920s and '30s. At the time, walls of death were often called silo-motordromes.

She later became the operator of a long range shooting gallery.

== Cinema ==
- Advice To Adventurous Girls, Director Kim Wood, 1998.

== Popular culture ==
"Wall of Death" was a song by Richard and Linda Thompson. https://www.youtube.com/watch?v=GcFhyy2kgdo
