= Mysophilia =

Sexual paraphilia from filth

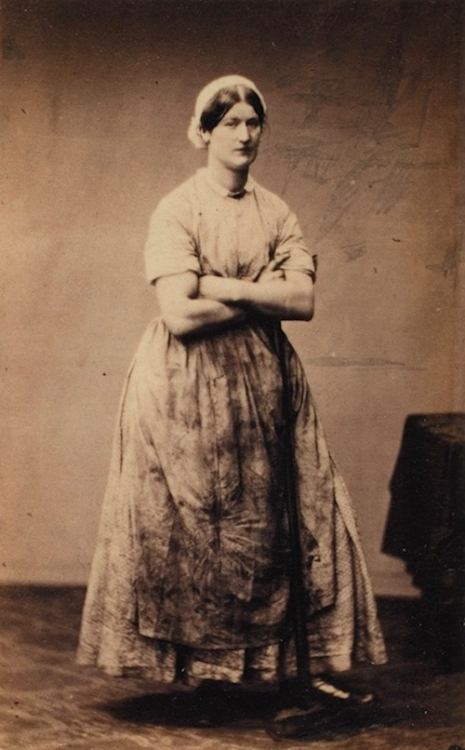
Hannah Cullwick, English maidservant and diarist, posed "in her dirt" for partner Arthur Munby.

Mysophilia is a paraphilia where erotic pleasure is derived from filth. Mysophiles may find dirt, soiled underwear, feces, unwashed people, or vomit to be sexually arousing. Automysophillia is when a person derives sexual pleasure from being dirty or unwashed themselves.

Paraphilias such as coprophilia, urophilia, and emetophilia are all considered subtypes of mysophillia. Richard von Krafft-Ebing attributed these types of paraphilias to latent masochism.

== In culture ==
The protagonist of the novel Wetlands, and the film based on the book, would be considered a mysophiliac, deriving pleasure from not washing and from dirty locations, such as toilets.

In a famous myth, Napoleon Bonaparte, while campaigning in 1796, wrote to his wife Joséphine: "Please don't wash, will arrive in three days". This can be interpreted as mysophiliac behaviour if it is assumed this was to ensure her clothes, as well as her person, were soiled.

Arthur Munby, 19th-century English writer, and his wife Hannah Cullwick, a maidservant, both wrote extensively in diaries about the dirt accumulated in household tasks. During courtship, Munby frequently requested Cullwick visited him still dirty from her work sweeping chimneys and cleaning boots.

== See also ==
- Mud wrestling
- Salirophilia
- Wet and messy fetishism
