= Wilhelm Lindemann =

Wilhelm Lindemann (17 December 1828, in Schonnebeck near Essen – 20 December 1879, in Niederkrüchten) was a Catholic historian of German literature.

== Biography ==
Lindemann attended the gymnasium at Essen, studied theology in Bonn from 1848 to 1851, and was ordained in Cologne, 2 September 1852. He was rector of the municipal high school of Heinsberg from 1853 to 1860, then parish-priest at Rheinbreitbach, and later at Venrath from 1863 to 1866, when he became pastor of Niederkrüchten, and remained so till his death. From 1870 to 1879 he served as a member of the Prussian Diet as one of the Centre Party. The University of Würzburg recognized his literary achievements by conferring on him, in 1872, the degree of Doctor of Philosophy.

== Works ==
Lindemann's principal literary work is the Geschichte der Deutschen Literatur, which first appeared in 1866 (eighth edition, Freiburg, 1905). This was the first exhaustive treatise made of the history of German literature from a Catholic point of view, and was an effort to bring to greater prominence Catholic poets and thinkers who therefore had either failed to receive recognition or had been treated with hostility. The author modeled it on August Friedrich Christian Vilmar's widely read Geschichte der deutschen Nationalliteratur ("History of German National Literature").

His other works include:

- Bibliothek deutscher Klassiker (1868–71), containing selections from Goethe, Schiller, Lessing, Herder, writers of the Romantic school and poets of later times
- Blumenstrauss von Geistlichen Gedichten des deutschen Mittelaters (1874)
- Für die Pilgerreise (1877), a collection of religious poems

Besides these Lindemann produced two biographical works, the one on Angelus Silesius (1876) and the other on Johann Geiler von Kaisersberg, from the French by Léon Dacheux (1877), both of which appear in the Sammlung historischer Bildnisse 3rd series, vol. VIII, and 4th series, vol. II. Lindemann was also a contributor to periodicals.
