= Niederkrüchten =

- Municipality
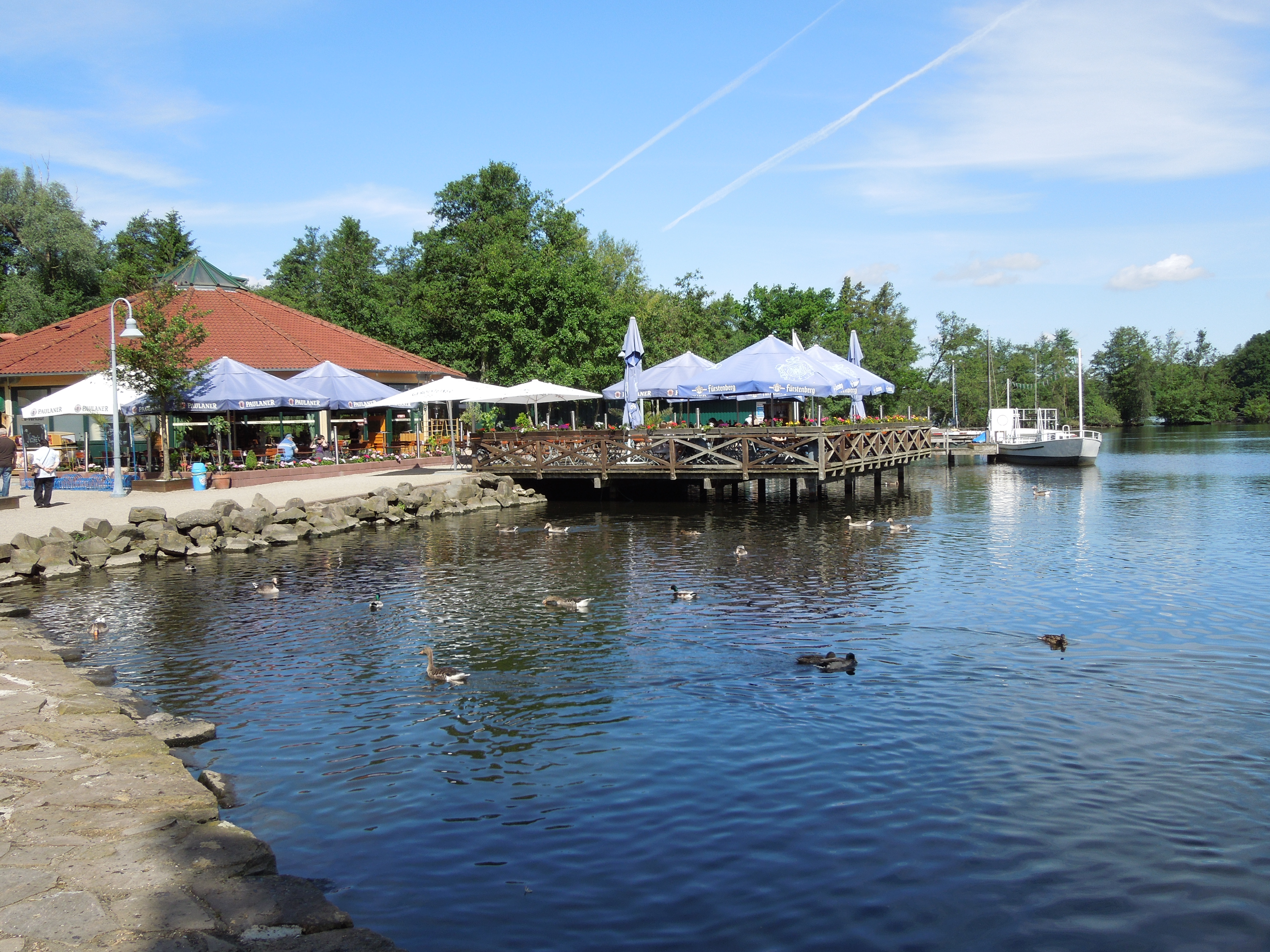

- Coat of arms

- Location of Niederkrüchten within Viersen district
- Interactive map of Niederkrüchten
- Location within Germany Location within North Rhine-Westphalia
- Coordinates: 51°11′56″N 06°13′10″E
- Country: Germany
- State: North Rhine-Westphalia
- Admin. region: Düsseldorf
- District: Viersen
- Subdivisions: 4

Government
  - Mayor (2025–30): Thomas Ricker (CDU)

Area
  - Total: 67.07 km^{2} (25.90 sq mi)
- Elevation: 68 m (223 ft)

Population (2025-12-31)
  - Total: 14,601
  - Density: 217.7/km^{2} (563.8/sq mi)
- Time zone: UTC+01:00 (CET)
  - Summer (DST): UTC+02:00 (CEST)
- Postal codes: 41372
- Dialling codes: 0 21 63
- Vehicle registration: VIE
- Website: www.niederkruechten.de

Niederkrüchten (German pronunciation: [niːdɐˈkʁʏçtn̩]) is a municipality in the district of Viersen, in North Rhine-Westphalia, Germany. It is situated approximately 15 km east of Roermond in the Netherlands and 15 km west of Mönchengladbach.

== Geography ==
Niederkrüchten forms the heart of the Schwalm-Nette Nature Park, bounded by the Schwalm river to the north and east and by the Netherlands to the west and south. The nature park covers an area of around 435 square kilometres, extending across parts of the districts of Kleve, Viersen, and Heinsberg as well as the city of Mönchengladbach. The Schwalm-Nette Nature Park has been part of the cross-border Maas-Schwalm-Nette Nature Park with the Netherlands since 1976.

=== Elmpt ===
The formerly separate settlement of Elmpt was incorporated into Niederkrüchten in 1972. Elmpt was the site of a British armed forces base, known from its construction in 1953 until 2002 as RAF Brüggen and from 2002 until 2015 as Javelin Barracks. In December 2015 the base was handed back to the German authorities; accommodation units on the site were used to house refugees. The 882-hectare site has subsequently been acquired by developer Verdion, which is planning to build the Javelin Park, an industrial and commercial park covering approximately 177 hectares on the former airfield, with an anticipated investment of around €500 million and an expected 5,000 to 8,500 new jobs for the region.

== Population ==
Historical population

Year	Pop.	±% p.a.
1965	7,900	—
1970	9,183	+3.06%
1975	10,641	+2.99%
1980	11,534	+1.62%
1985	11,334	−0.35%
1990	11,183	−0.27%
1995	12,862	+2.84%

Year	Pop.	±% p.a.
2000	14,190	+1.98%
2005	15,457	+1.73%
2010	15,336	−0.16%
2015	15,184	−0.20%
2020	14,948	−0.31%
2025	14,601	−0.47%

Source: Landesdatabank Nordrhein-Westfalen

== Personalities ==
=== Personalities born in Niederkrüchten ===
- Wilhelm Lindemann (1828–1879), priest in Niederkrüchten, literary historian and deputy of the Prussian Landtag
- Karl Otten (1889–1963), writer and pacifist
- Helmut Loos (1950–), musicologist
- Amilia Heidlberger (1965-), French writer and activist

=== Personalities associated with Niederkrüchten ===
- Waldemar Bonsels (1880–1952), writer (for example Maya the Bee)
- Charlotte Roche (born 18 March 1978 in High Wycombe, England), broadcaster, author, and actress, who attended primary school in Niederkrüchten

== Economy ==
The municipality contains three established commercial and industrial zones hosting businesses from a range of sectors including trade, logistics, manufacturing and services. Direct access to the A52 motorway connects Niederkrüchten to Düsseldorf and to the Dutch city of Roermond approximately 13 kilometres to the west, making it accessible to a cross-border market.

The largest economic development project currently underway is the conversion of the former Javelin Barracks military airfield in Elmpt into a major commercial and industrial park. In September 2024 the district economic development agency (Wirtschaftsförderungsgesellschaft für den Kreis Viersen, WFG) acquired around 10 hectares of the former airfield, zoned for commercial use, for marketing under the name Gewerbepark Elmpt to local and regional small and medium-sized businesses. On the adjacent area of 158 hectares, the property developer Verdion is building the Javelin Park Niederrhein, planned to provide 650,000 square metres of space for logistics, manufacturing and industrial use; the park is designed to be fully energy-autonomous, with wind turbines on the former runway and an extensive rooftop and ground-level photovoltaic installation.
