= Eden (2006 film) =

- Directed by: Michael Hofmann
- Written by: Michael Hofmann
- Starring: Josef Ostendorf; Charlotte Roche; Devid Striesow
- Distributed by: Cinemien
- Release date: 23 November 2006
- Running time: 98 minutes
- Country: Germany
- Language: German

Eden is a 2006 German film directed by Michael Hofmann in which a chef falls for a married woman.

== Premise ==
"A successful chef falls for a married woman."

== Cast ==
- Josef Ostendorf - Gregor
- Charlotte Roche - Eden
- Devid Striesow - Xaver
- Uta Zech - Edens Kollegin
- Roeland Wiesnekker - Frank
- Pascal Ulli - Toni
