= Hannah Cullwick =

English diarist

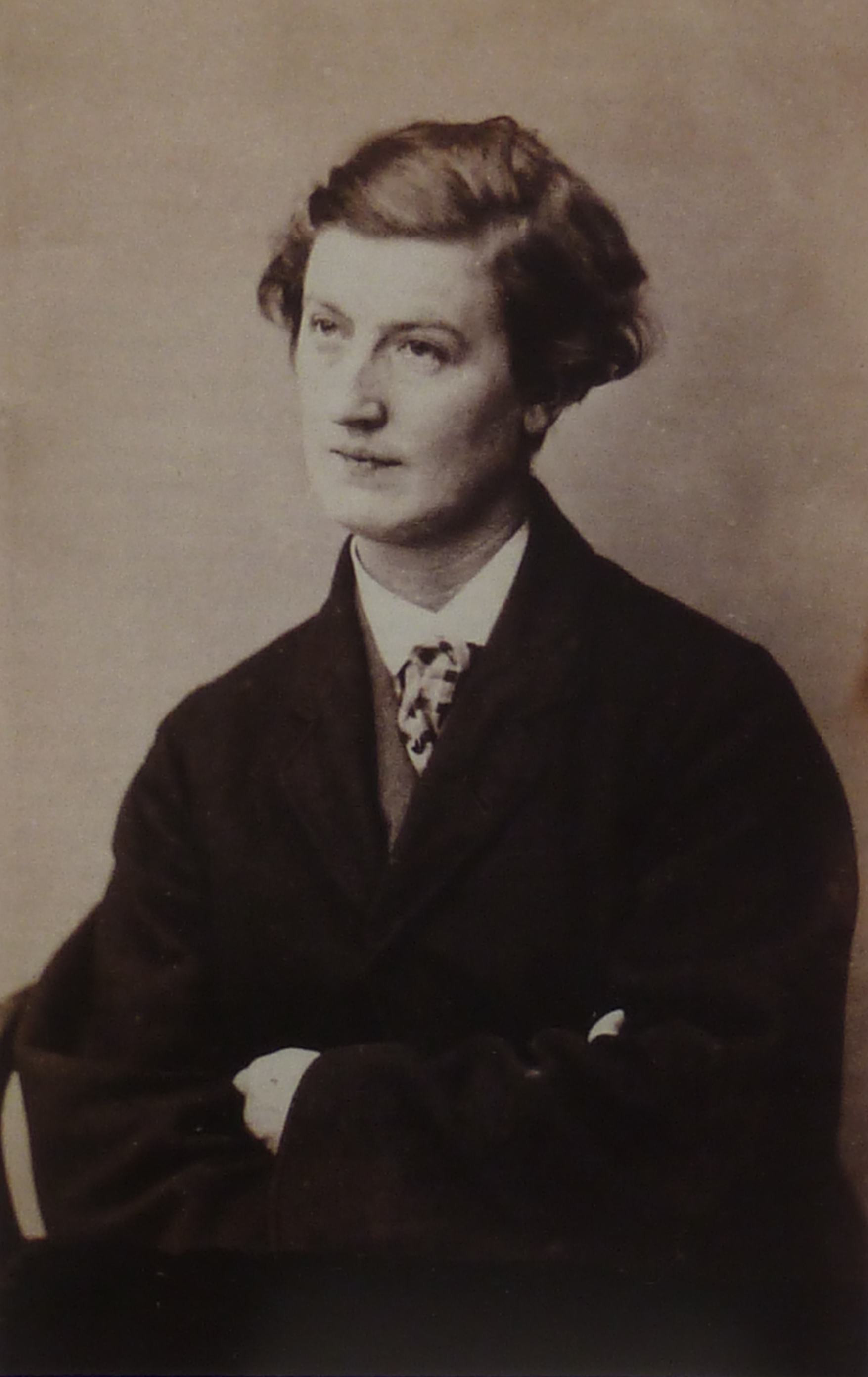
- Hannah Cullwick dressed as a man
- Born: 26 May 1833; Shifnal, Shropshire, England
- Died: 9 July 1909 (aged 76); Shifnal, Shropshire, England
- Occupations: Maid-of-all-work, Diarist
- Spouse: Arthur Munby

Hannah Cullwick (26 May 1833 – 9 July 1909) was a working-class English woman whose diary depicts her immense pride in her work and reveals themes of domestic and racial fetishism that structured both her life and the society of the British Empire in which she lived.

While working in domestic service, Hannah Cullwick had a chance encounter with prominent barrister and philanthropist Arthur Munby, who was conducting a close study of the conditions of working women. The two embarked on a lifelong, unconventional relationship. Both of their diaries – as well as letters and photographs – document the role-playing, cross-dressing, and other fetish rituals that differentiate their relationship from the perceived norms of Victorian England. Cullwick's diary also reveals the autonomy she was able to keep even in the throes of extreme social inequality.

== Early life and immediate family ==
Cullwick was born on 26 May 1833 and raised in Shifnal, Shropshire, England. Her father was Charles Fox Cullwick (1803–1847), a Master Saddler of Shifnal and a Burgess of Bridgnorth. The family had been Master Saddlers in Shropshire since one of Charles's great-great-grandfathers, Richard Cullwick (1648–c1720), of Newport, set up his saddlery business, about 1670. Hannah's mother was Martha Owen (1800–1847), a Lady's Maid to the aristocratic Mrs Eyton. Cullwick had more than a dozen uncles and aunts, and more than fifty first cousins. All were literate, and most were in business as farmers, publicans, and saddlers.

Hannah's father, Charles, appears to have suffered business losses; the family was subsequently very poor. There were five children: Hannah, James (1830–1915), Dick (1836–1887), Ellen (1839–1915), and Polly (1844–1924). James was a master wheelwright and later owned houses. Dick was a master saddler and became a harness maker in London. Ellen married William Cook, the Registrar for Poplar in London. Polly owned a large haberdashery store in the Ipswich Buttermarket.

The five children received a rudimentary schooling; Hannah was sent to the Bluecoat Charity school in Shifnal, and had to contribute financially to the family from the age of eight—first in the home of a solicitor's wife, Mrs Andrew Phillips, a friend and neighbor of the Cullwicks, and then in the Red Lion Inn before becoming the sole nursemaid to the large family of the Reverend Robert Eyton at Ryton Rectory.

When Cullwick was fourteen, both of her parents died suddenly. Her mother died of an infection, at the age of 47, and Hannah's employer, Rev Robert Eyton, refused to let her travel to visit her family, fearing that the fever would spread to Ryton, the nearby village. Hannah's father died two weeks later, at the age of 44, leaving the five children (ages 3-16) as orphans. The three youngest children needed to be housed: Dick was placed in a saddlery apprenticeship in Horsley Fields, Wolverhampton, with his uncle, William Cullwick (1781–1853); Ellen lived with Aunt Small (née Sarah Owen) on her large farm, in Albrighton near Shrewsbury; and Polly went to live with her spinster aunt Elizabeth Cullwick (1789–1866), in Haughton, Shifnal.

When Hannah was seventeen, she worked as under-housemaid for Lady Boughey at Aqualate Hall, Forton, Staffordshire. She was dismissed after eight months because her mistress saw her (as she later recorded) "playing as we was cleaning our kettles."

Cullwick then worked for Lady Louisa Cotes (1814–1887), wife of John Cotes (1799–1874), of Woodcote Hall, Sheriffhales. During the London seasons of 1852, 1853 and 1854, Lady Cotes took Cullwick as her kitchen maid to London. She worked as a lower servant at both rural manorial estates and urban dwellings of elites. Other specific occupations included working as a pot girl in an inn, a nursery maid, and a kitchen maid.

== Relationship with Arthur Munby ==
In London of May 1854, Cullwick met Arthur Munby during one of his regular urban expeditions to investigate working women. Munby was struck by her size (5 feet 7^{1}/_{2} inches (171.5 cm), 161 pounds (73 kg)) and strength, combined with the nobility of character he claimed to see in working women. Cullwick saw him as an idealised gentleman, who celebrated the intense labour she did as a maid of all work. To be near Munby, she began to work in various middle-class households in London, including an upholsterer's, a beer merchant's, in lodging houses (which gave her more freedom from supervision), and that of a widow with several daughters.

Before she met Munby, Cullwick had seen a lavish musical, The Death of Sardanapalus; it was the first time she attended the theatre in her life. The musical, based on the play by Lord Byron, told of an ancient, pacifist king who loved one of his slave girls. The slave, Myrrha, loved the king, but also had her own democratic and republican desires. Cullwick empathised strongly with the play's heroine.

Their courtship lasted for 18 years until they married on 14 January 1873. Cullwick prioritised her status as a working-class woman, but eventually married Munby with reluctance in Clerkenwell Parish Church by Special Licence granted by Archibald Campbell Tait, the then-Archbishop of Canterbury. Even after their marriage, Hannah Cullwick kept her maiden name. Munby and Cullwick never had any children because Cullwick never wanted to have any children.

Once they were married, she moved to his lodgings in Fig Tree Court, Inner Temple, central London, where she lived as both his wife and servant in his basement kitchen. Munby paid Cullwick a housekeeper's salary for the remainder of her life – even though wifely duties were unpaid during the time period. Munby even paid her during the decade apart after a major altercation in late October, 1877, which resulted in their temporary separation. During the following 9 years, she seldom met her husband and lived with several friends and relatives in Shifnal, Wombridge, Brewood, Wolverhampton and Bearley near Stratford-upon-Avon, where she cared for her niece's husband's grandmother Mrs Hannah Gibbs. From 1887 onwards, she and Munby rented a cottage in the Shropshire village of Hadley, and they regularly spent time together. In 1903, they moved to Wyke Place in Shifnal, just a few meters from the house where Cullwick was born.

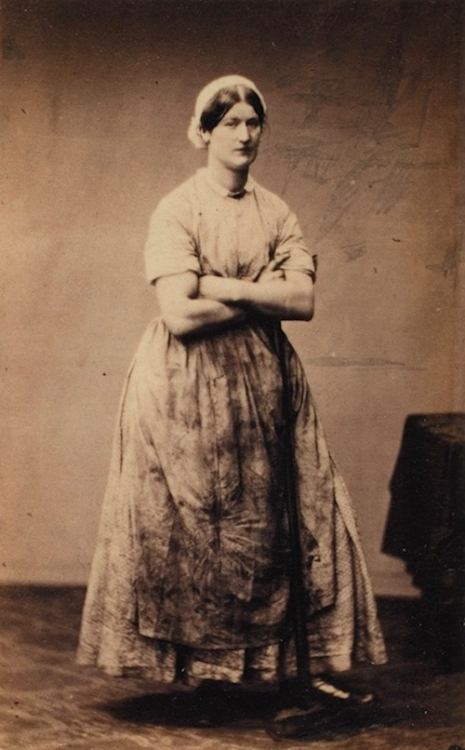
A photo of Hannah Cullwick "in her dirt." Munby frequently requested Cullwick visit him without cleaning.

=== Fetishism ===
Cullwick and Munby's relationship included a strong current of fetishistic roleplay. Shortly after they met, Cullwick began to call herself Munby's "drudge and slave," and called him "Massa" (referencing the black slave dialectal pronunciation of "Master"). For much of her life, she wore a leather strap, which she called a "slave band," around her right wrist and a locking chain around her neck, to which Munby had a key. She wrote letters almost daily to him, describing her long hours of work in great detail. She would arrange to visit him "in [her] dirt," showing the results of a full day's cleaning and other domestic work. She also frequently wore blackface, as they would have seen in minstrel troupes in London. Cullwick reported enjoying the degradation involved with cleaning boots and sometimes cleaned them with her mouth. Based on Cullwick's accounts, the couple did not engage in sexual intercourse, either before or after their marriage, as she described occasional kissing as "[loving] me as much as your nature will allow you to." At times, the two roleplayed as adult and baby, with Cullwick cradling Munby. Munby photographed Cullwick in a variety of costumes, dressing as an upper-class man, a Black male slave, an upper-class lady, or other situations.

Cullwick's insistence on maintaining a master-slave relationship between the two caused friction at times. Munby at first embraced the idea, encouraging her to perform degrading work as a way to achieve a sort of redemption through abasement, which he described as "inverted Socratic theory." However, later, after marrying, he expressed regret about his teachings to her about the value of work and degradation, as she refused to participate in the social niceties expected either of a wife or a servant.

=== Diaries ===
Lighted the fire. Swept the birdroom' & dusted the other rooms. Clean'd 3 pairs of boots. Got breakfast up & made the beds & emptied the slops. Clean'd & wash'd up. Put the linen for the wash. Cleaned the brass rods & the bedroom windows & the sills. Put up clean curtains. Clean'd the knives & got dinner ready; laid the hearth & took it up. Clean'd away & then went upstairs & clean'd the bedrooms on my knees. Got tea. Clean'd away & wash'd up in the scullery. Went out on errands & got supper ready. Mr Cleveland was expected but didn't come till after. I took a note to Mr Brewer for the Missis & then had supper. Clean'd away & wash'd up & to bed at 11.

— Hannah Cullwick's diary, 16 July 1860 (punctuation and spelling normalized)

Diary-keeping became part of the relationship between the two shortly after meeting, when Munby encouraged Cullwick to write and send diaries and letters so the two could keep in touch. Servants in this period had little free time, so despite living just a few miles away from one another, the two were rarely able to meet until they lived in the same household. Due to the social and educational gap between the two they had trouble making conversation in person; the diaries were a way for Cullwick to relate information Munby wanted to know: the number of boots cleaned, dirty tasks done around the home, and how she spent her money.

Cullwick's diaries span seventeen volumes and were written from 1854 to 1873, comprising several million words. The tone and style varies from brief sentence-long summaries to longer, more thoughtful entries. Munby seems to be the main motivator of her diary-keeping, as she professed to prefer sewing, and ceased writing diary entries after their marriage.

== Historical analysis ==
Hannah Cullwick's life and diaries have been thought by historians to exemplify a number of social dynamics that characterized the Victorian era in which she and her husband, Arthur Munby, lived. Their roleplaying scenarios frequently dramatized the intersections of sexuality, race, social class, and gender. Cullwick's role as a maid-of-all-work allowed her to straddle the dwindling world of the ancient gentry and the growing world of industrialization.

=== Women in Victorian England and the art of invisible labour ===
Middle-class women in Victorian England were often expected to display idle, leisurely lifestyles. Women were meant to maintain the domestic sphere as housewives, but conceal any signs of their labor within their households. Despite the fact that maintaining a middle-class household required immense amounts of energy, often requiring the help of maids like Hannah Cullwick, women attempted to hide any evidence of their work and conform to the societal ideal of the idle woman. However, only a small population of the elite-upper and upper-middle class were able to afford adequate household staff to maintain their houses. In reality, many middle-class women were working tirelessly to maintain the upkeep of their homes, desperately trying to preserve their station in the "respectable" class. The concept of the ideal woman, who performed the "conspicuous labor of leisure," devalued the work that women were actually doing, hiding this work from society's view.

If Victorian households had enough income at their disposal and they were able to employ household servants, these servants were expected to remain unseen. Servants were expected to do their most unsanitary work during the early hours of the morning or the late hours of the night, avoiding the view of their employers and guests. Maids and governesses were also expected to present themselves with clean white sleeves and aprons, removing any indication of their labor from the domestic realm.

=== Cullwick's pride in her work ===
No, I've long resolved in my own mind & felt that, for freedom & true lowliness, there's nothing like being a maid of all work. No one can think you set up or proud in that, & I'd leifer be despised than cause spite or envy from my fellow servants. And I would leifer do all the scrubbing both out o' doors & in, wearing my thick striped apron, peasant's bonnet, short frock & thick boots - having black arms & hands, & face too if it happens with soot or dust, than I'd be prim & clean in the kitchen looking on at anyone else doing the work I've bin so used to & liked for this 30 year. And as I once said to Massa, 'I was born to serve, & not to order,' and I hope I shall always keep the same humble spirit - that of liking to serve others, & obeying instead of commanding.

— "A Servant's Life", Hannah Cullwick's overview of her life from 1866-1872

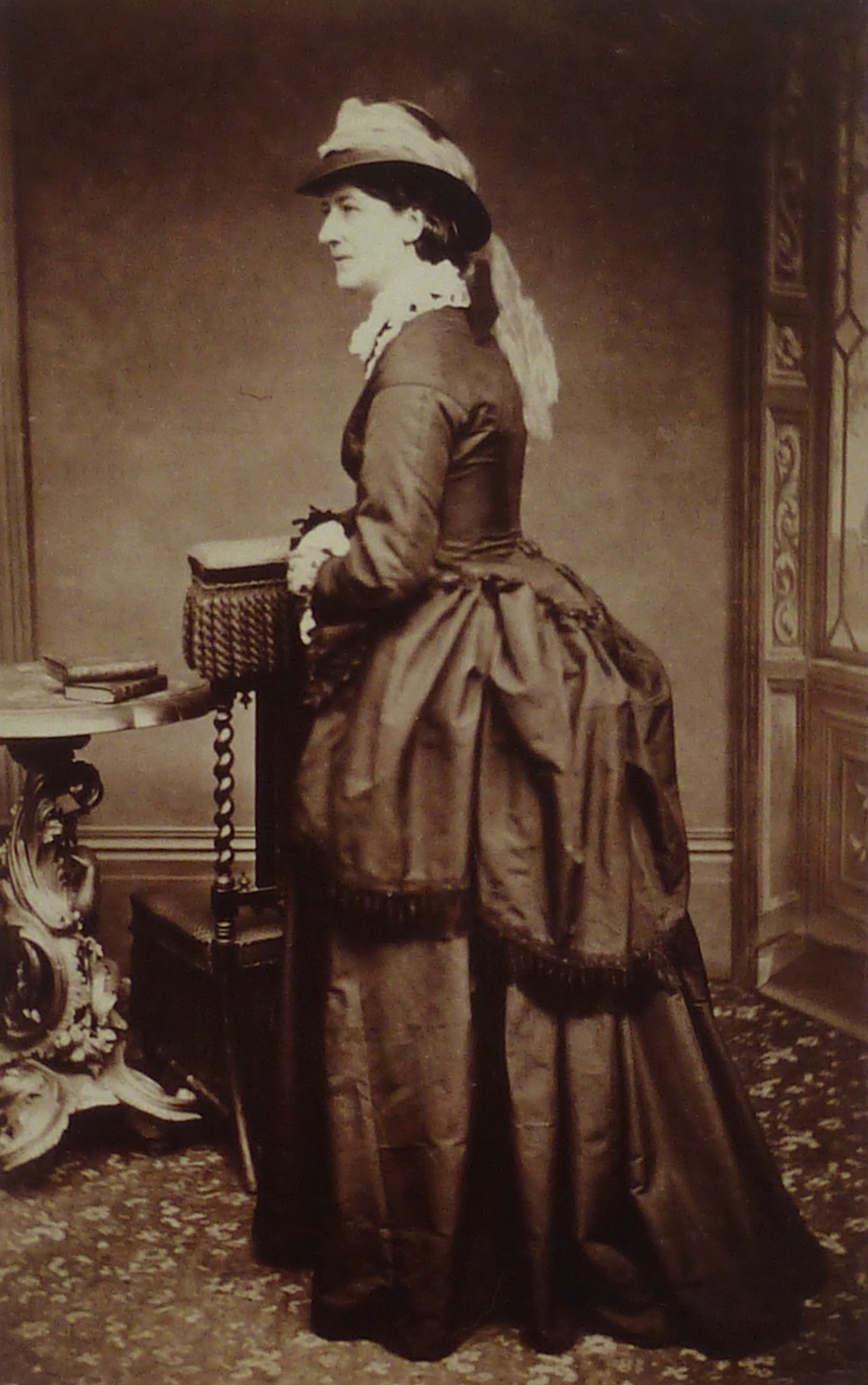
Hannah Cullwick dressed up as an upper class lady

Cullwick's diary entries and the existing photos of her cross-dressing illustrate her intense identification with her status and role as a working-class woman rather than a desire to change her position in society. Cullwick's upbringing and working-class community helped instill this pride in her. Her mother's occupation as a lady's maid especially influenced Cullwick's pride in being a working woman.

Cullwick's voluminous diary recounts the daily regimen of her work, listing the amount of work she accomplished with exact numbers. Particularly, Cullwick meticulously recorded the amount of boots she cleaned on a monthly and yearly basis. She cleaned hundreds each year, sometimes by licking them. She once told Munby that she could tell where her "Massa" had been by how his boots tasted. This emphasis on the physical labour she performed works against the rhetoric of the Victorian idle woman and her invisible labour.

Cullwick's diary also reveals the influence of Christianity on her life. Cullwick viewed her difficult labour as a means of accruing spiritual capital to facilitate her path to heaven. Her pride in her work stems from the belief that God would recognise her value, even if the dominant society around her refused to acknowledge domestic drudgeries.

Further, Cullwick often wore her slave band even when Munby requested she take it off. In an image of her cross-dressing as an upper class lady, for example, Cullwick's slave band remains visible on her wrist. Rather than fully give up her identity and association with work, Cullwick wears her slave band – even against Munby's desire to fully see her transform into an upper class lady. This pride that Cullwick found in her domestic duties offers an increased focus on the role of women's labour and the women who performed it during the Victorian era.

=== Roleplaying ===
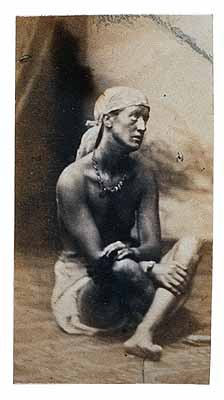
Cullwick cross-dressed as a Black male slave

Cullwick and Munby's relationship depicts how the power dynamics of empire and the subversion of such power are visible in the details of ‘ordinary’ people's lives. Through dressing up as different classes and races, Cullwick and Munby's fetishisation practices demonstrate how the power dynamics of empire trickle into everyday life. These power dynamics include class, racial, gendered, age, and economic relationships. In the theatre of cross-dressing and sadomasochism, one actor performs power over the other. Cullwick and Munby used real power relationships of their time – adult over baby, master over servant, White man over Black slave – as points of reference to create their scenarios. Photos of Cullwick posing as a male slave with Blackface, for instance, demonstrate the race-based inequality of the British Empire. Similarly, Cullwick cross-dressing as a farmworker illustrates the inequality between the urban and rural in the context of empire – people on the fringes of empire, like farmworkers, generally had less access to power than those near the epicentre.

The paradox of their S/M relationship exposes these social conventions of empire as entirely constructed. This paradox lies in how the relationship simultaneously parades "a slavish obedience to conventions of power" and, "with its exaggerated emphasis on costumery, script, and scene", reveals that "social order is unnatural, scripted, and invented". In other words, dichotomous categories such as man and woman, slave and master, and White and Black are not natural, pre-existing divisions, but rather have been constructed and manipulated by hegemonic values of societies over time. Cullwick's ability to adopt different social identities at will suggests that other people could likewise morph into various races, social classes, and genders. These categories did not have the rigid boundaries assumed of them, but rather maintained a certain fluidity that made Cullwick and Munby's fetishisation through cross-dressing possible.

=== Dirt fetish and the slave band ===
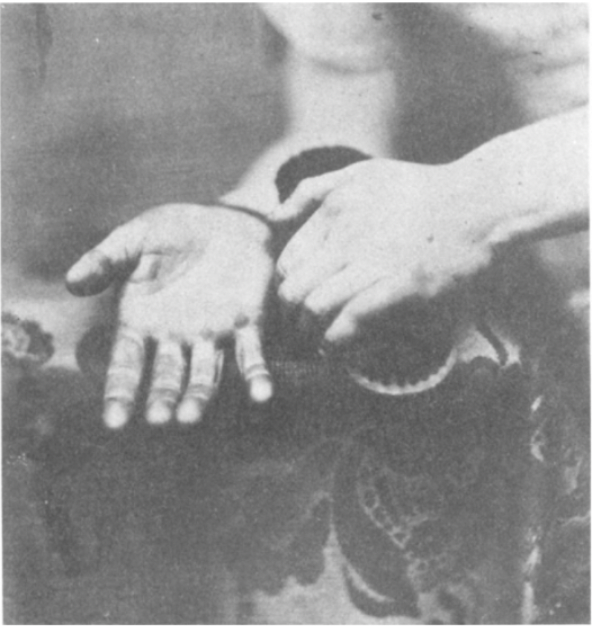
Dirt displayed on Hannah Cullwick's hands

In the Victorian era, the presence of dirt was associated with the working class; dirt was associated with labor. It was considered unacceptable for women to showcase their labor. It was impermissible to display dirt on women's hands or clothes. Cullwick defied Victorian social clothes by proudly wearing a "slave band" on her arm and displaying her dirt from domestic labor. In photos taken by Munby, Cullwick exhibits her dirt fetish and wears her "slave band" on her arm. In doing so, Cullwick acknowledges her working class labor and dismantles the denial of women's domestic work.

When Cullwick hurt her wrist while performing domestic work, she began wearing a leather strap around her wrist. After her wrist had healed, she continued to wear the strap, as a symbol of her devotion to Munby. In one of her diaries, she details an instance where she was asked by her employer to remove her "slave band" while serving dinner guests. Cullwick refused to remove the strap, rejecting her employer's insistence that she remove the dirty strap. As a result, Cullwick was dismissed from her employment.

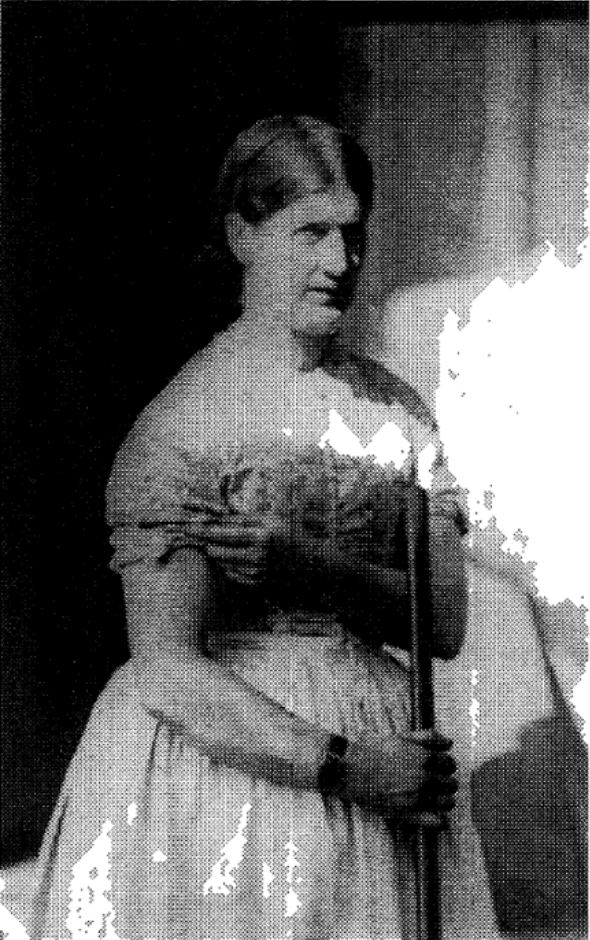
Hannah Cullwick displays her "slave band"

In her diary, Cullwick recorded that she refused to remove the strap because it was "the sign that I'm a drudge & belong to Massa", which illustrates that she did not accept the degradation of her domestic work (McClintock). In the dining room of a middle-class Victorian home, where women were supposed to exhibit their leisurely lives, Cullwick proudly wore a symbol of her work. Cullwick also presented her "slave band" in photographs that Arthur Munby took for their mutual enjoyment.

This "slave band" that Hannah Cullwick wore also illustrated the British Empire's reliance on slave labour. Due to abolitionism in the United Kingdom, during Hannah Cullwick's lifetime, the British industrial economy was gradually transforming from a slave market to a wage market. When Cullwick defiantly displayed her "slave band" in her employer's home, she plagued the bourgeois memory with images of imperial slavery. Her "slave band" disrupted the ideal representation of labour within the British Empire. The "slave band" indicates the indispensable results of slave labour that built the foundation of the imperial empire.

=== Cullwick's independence and diary entries ===
Whereas most women of her class were illiterate during the time period, Cullwick left behind several diaries. This act of recording her life in itself displays a certain independence and resistance to the rules of society. Despite the information available through these diaries, Munby's biographer, Derek Hudson, and other historians strip Cullwick of any agency by portraying her as subservient with little will of her own.

However, Cullwick's diaries demonstrate her ability to maintain a semblance of self-government. She stood up for herself when she thought the terms of her relationship with Munby were being violated. Her refusal and eventual reluctant acceptance to enter society as his wife, for instance, reveals a measure of agency even in the midst of unequal power dynamics. It was only hesitantly that she entered into marriage with Munby, believing that becoming a wife would lead to dependency and boredom. Cullwick also never surrendered her birth name despite the marriage contract. Similarly, Cullwick remained childless by choice and thus was able to devote her time to her work rather than caring for children.

Cullwick's diaries also demonstrate her level of autonomy in dictating her and Munby's fetish rituals. Although historians such as Derek Hudson portray Cullwick as solely succumbing to Munby's desires, she held some power in the organisation of their relationship. Some of these practices involved a reversal of power dynamics, with Cullwick acting as the dominating partner. While Munby's diaries fail to disclose some of these practices, Cullwick wrote of how she would bathe Munby, rock him in her arms, and nurse him like a baby.

== Death and legacy ==
Cullwick remained actively working until shortly before her death. She died on July 9, 1909 at the age of 76. The cause of death was recorded as "failure of heart action and senile decay." Her remains were buried in St Andrew's churchyard in Shifnal, with a gravestone bearing the words: "she was for 36 years of pure and unbroken love the wedded wife of Arthur Munby of Clifton Holme in the Wapentake of Bulmer."

Munby died the following January at the age of 81, leaving behind an estate of £26,000. He bequeathed his books and 2 deed-boxes filled with correspondence, diaries, and photographs, to the British Museum. They were unable to accept the donation, and provision was made for the items to be kept at Trinity College, Cambridge, and not opened until 1950. Emily Gibbs' daughter, Ada Perks (1882–1971), asked the Master of Trinity College if she should represent the Cullwick family at the opening of the boxes, and was informed there was no need.

Cullwick's diaries (small selections of which are published as The Diaries of Hannah Cullwick, Victorian Maidservant in the controversial edition by the Marxist historian Lizbeth Stanley, not approved by Cullwick's family) provide detailed information on the lives of working-class Victorian servant women. They are a record of sixteen-hour days and profound respect for the middle-class morality of the era despite her deviancy from sexual norms.

In 2003, a short independent film based on Cullwick's diaries, On My Knees, was made by Kim Wood. It stars Melora Creager of Rasputina.

A full biography published in 2022 by a distant relative, John Cullwick, contained many new facts about her early life, the reasons she and Munby were apart between 1877-1887 and much about their last 20 years together in Shropshire.

Cullwick was portrayed by Elizabeth Rider in An Uncommon Love, an audio drama about her relationship with Munby by Michelene Wandor that was broadcast on BBC Radio 4 in 1984 and repeated on BBC Radio 4 Extra in 2025.

== Bibliography ==
- Judith Flanders. Inside the Victorian Home: A Portrait of Domestic Life in Victorian England. New York: W. W. Norton, 2004.
- Diane Atkinson. Love and Dirt: The Marriage of Arthur Munby and Hannah Cullwick. New York: Macmillan, 2003 (ISBN 0-333-78071-X).
- Barry Reay. Watching Hannah: Sexuality, Horror and Bodily De-formation in Victorian England. Reaktion, 2002. (ISBN 1-86189-119-9)
- Anne McClintock, Imperial Leather: Race, Gender, and Sex in the Colonial Contest. New York: Routledge, 1995. (ISBN 0-415-90890-6)
- Liz Stanley, ed. The Diaries of Hannah Cullwick, Victorian Maidservant. Rutgers, 1984 (ISBN 0-8135-1070-8).
- John Cullwick. Our Hannah: A biography of the Victorian published diarist Hannah Cullwick (1833-1909). Lewis Sinclair Associates 2022 ISBN 978-1-3999-3139-7.
- Patricia Branca. Silent Sisterhood: Middle Class Women in the Victorian Home. London: Croom Helm, 1975. ISBN 0-856-64202-9.
