= Helmut Loos =

German musicologist and emeritus scholar (born 1950)

Helmut Loos (born 5 July 1950) is a German musicologist and emeritus scholar.

== Life ==
Born in Niederkrüchten, Loos studied music education from 1971 to 1974 and musicology, art history and philosophy from 1974 to 1980 at the University of Bonn. He received his doctorate in 1980 and was a research assistant at the Musicology Department of the University of Bonn from 1981 to 1989. In 1989 he completed his habilitation.

From 1989 to 1993 Loos was director of the Institute for German Music in the East in Bergisch Gladbach. In April 1993 he was appointed to the chair of historical musicology at the Technical University of Chemnitz.

From October 2001 to March 2017 he held a professorship at the Institute for Musicology of the University of Leipzig.

His research focuses on the music of the 19th and 20th centuries, religious music and the music-cultural relations of Germany with Central and Eastern Europe.

== Publications ==
- Zur Klavierübertragung von Werken für und mit Orchester des 19. und 20. Jahrhunderts. Ein Beitrag zur Geschichte des Klavierauszuges (Schriften zur Musik, vol. 25), Munich/Salzburg 1983
- Weihnachten in der Musik. Grundzüge der Geschichte weihnachtlicher Musik
- Robert Schumann. Werk und Leben (Vienna: Edition Steinbauer, 2010, ISBN 978-3-902494-44-3)
- Frédéric Chopin, as Robert Schumann and Felix Mendelssohn Bartholdy have seen him. Two Warsaw Lectures (Leipzig: Schröder, 2011, ISBN 978-3-926196-62-0)
- E-Musik – Kunstreligion der Moderne. Beethoven und andere Götter (Bärenreiter, Kassel 2017, ISBN 978-3-761824-35-1)
