= Wetlands (2013 film) =

- Film poster
- Directed by: David Wnendt
- Screenplay by: David Wnendt; Claus Falkenberg
- Based on: Wetlands by Charlotte Roche
- Produced by: Peter Rommel
- Starring: Carla Juri; Christoph Letkowski; Marlen Kruse; Meret Becker; Axel Milberg; Peri Baumeister; Edgar Selge; Harry Baer
- Cinematography: Jakub Bejnarowicz
- Edited by: Andreas Wodraschke
- Music by: Enis Rotthoff
- Production company: Rommel Film
- Distributed by: Strand Releasing
- Release date: 11 August 2013 (Locarno Film Festival)
- Running time: 109 minutes
- Country: Germany
- Language: German
- Box office: $10,501,000

Wetlands (German: Feuchtgebiete) is a 2013 German sex comedy drama film directed by David Wnendt. It is based on the 2008 novel of the same name by Charlotte Roche and focuses on feminist issues, sexuality and coming of age. The film premiered in International competition at the 2013 Locarno International Film Festival on 11 August 2013.

The film later premiered in-competition in the World Cinema Dramatic Competition at the 2014 Sundance Film Festival on 18 January 2014. After its premiere at the Sundance Film Festival, Strand Releasing acquired the US distribution rights for the film.

== Plot ==
Helen, an 18-year-old mysophiliac, uses vegetables for masturbation and believes that body hygiene is overrated in our society. She provokes others by saying and doing things most people would not even dare to imagine. She is sexually adventurous and visits a brothel to experience being with another woman.

Helen's parents are divorced and she desperately wishes that they get back together. But her mother is depressive, hygiene-obsessed and mentally unstable, and her father is insensitive and seems not to take notice of what people around him think. She also has a quiet, younger brother whom she teases by taking his stuffed bear.

Helen feels isolated from those around her, finding comfort only in her best friend, Corinna, with whom she routinely challenges societal taboos.

By shaving her anal hair too fast, she cuts herself badly and needs to go to hospital. There she plans to get her parents back together and charms her handsome nurse Robin, who is still suffering from a relationship with another nurse from two years before. That nurse does not get along with Helen and is still infatuated with Robin. She makes Helen's life in the hospital more difficult, but Helen and Robin fall in love during her hospital stay.

Helen's behaviour is revealed to be related to a traumatic experience she had when she was eight years old, when she found her mother trying to kill herself and Helen's little brother using the gas from the oven. At the end of the film, Helen reflects on that trauma by saying that she finally talked to her little brother about that experience and that it was the hardest talk she ever had. In the end, as she is with Robin in his van leaving the hospital, she sees her parents finally meeting in the parking lot, and she asks Robin to continue driving.

== Cast ==
- Carla Juri as Helen Memel
- Christoph Letkowski as Robin
- Marlen Kruse as Corinna
- Meret Becker as Helen's mother
- Axel Milberg as Helen's father
- Edgar Selge as Dr Notz
- Peri Baumeister as Schwester Valerie

== Reception ==
Wetlands received mostly positive reviews from critics. On the review aggregator website Rotten Tomatoes, 91% of 58 critics' reviews are positive, with an average rating of 7.2/10. The website's consensus reads: "While certainly not for the faint of heart, Wetlands transcends its shock value with sweetness, heart, and subversive wit." On Metacritic the film has a score of 77% out of 20 critic reviews indicating "generally favourable reviews". Scott Foundas of Variety said in his review that "Director David Wnendt and breakout star Carla Juri leave no bodily orifice unexplored in this spiky, smartly packaged commercial enterprise." Boyd van Hoeij, in his review for The Hollywood Reporter, called the film "A poppy take on boundary-pushing sexual matters featuring a stellar breakthrough performance." Eric Kohn of Indiewire graded the film B+ and praised the performance of Carla Juri and film by saying that "Juri's energetic performance – coupled with an equally jumpy soundtrack that includes Canned Heat and Peaches – manages to root the endeavor in fairly credible pathos, particularly with relation to her desire to see her parents reunite. If we're stuck with coming-of-age stories as a genre that storytellers must engage time and again, at least in the case of Wetlands the usual formula gets a much-needed jolt, while capably recognizing the aspects of the material that work on autopilot. The shock value only goes so far as a gimmick. Wetlands succeeds because, like Helen, it manages to sincerely embrace its taboos."

== Accolades ==
Year	Award	Category	Recipient	Result
2014	Sundance Film Festival	World Cinema Grand Jury Prize: Dramatic	David Wnendt	Nominated
2014	Deutscher Filmpreis	Best Performance by an Actress in a Leading Role	Carla Juri	Nominated
2014	Deutscher Filmpreis	Best Editing	Andreas Wodraschke	Nominated
2013	Locarno International Film Festival	Golden Leopard	David Wnendt	Nominated
2013	Locarno International Film Festival	Best Actress Leopard	Carla Juri	Nominated
2013	Bambi Awards	Best Actress - National	Carla Juri	Nominated
