= Léon Dacheux =

French historian

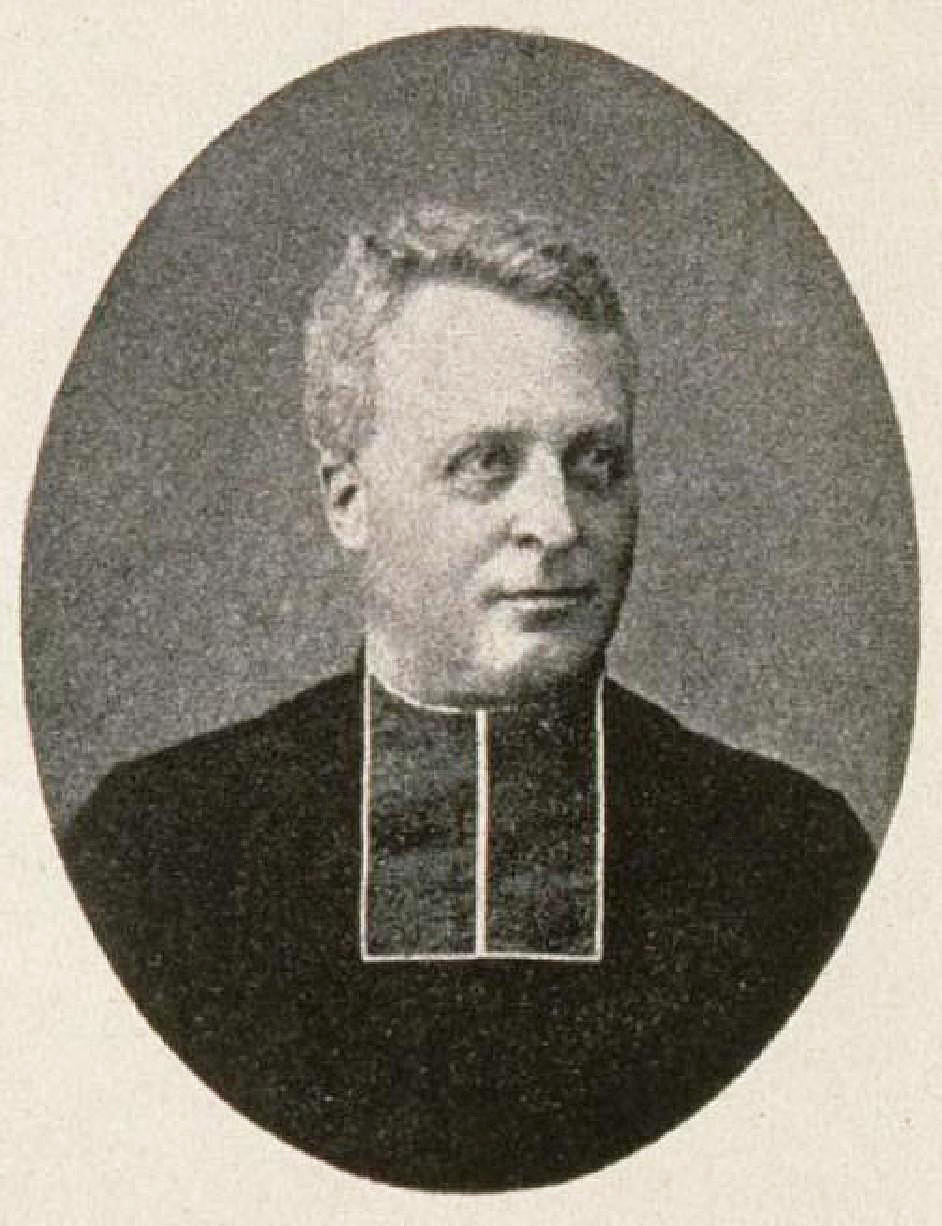
- Born: March 2, 1835; Bischheim, Alsace
- Died: March 8, 1903 (aged 68); Strasbourg
- Education: Petit Séminaire, Grand Séminaire (Strasbourg)
- Occupations: Catholic clergyman, historian
- Known for: Alsatian ecclesiastical history

Léon Dacheux (2 March 1835 – 8 March 1903) was an Alsatian Catholic clergyman and historian.

Born in Bischheim, he studied the classics at the Petit Séminaire and theology at the Grand Séminaire in Strasbourg, being ordained as a priest in 1857. In 1859 he attained the chair of rhetoric at the Petit Séminaire, and from 1868 onward, he served as a pastor in Neudorf-Strasbourg. In 1881, he was named supérieur at the Grand Séminaire, and in 1887 was appointed chanoine titulaire at the Cathédrale Notre-Dame de Strasbourg.

Dacheux died in Strasbourg.

== Selected works ==
- Un réformateur catholique a la fin du XVe siècle, Jean Geiler de Kaysersberg, prédicateur a la Cathédrale de Strasbourg, 1478-1510; étude sur sa vie et son temps, 1876 – Johann Geiler von Kaisersberg, preacher at the Strasbourg Cathedral, 1478–1510: study of his life and his era,
- Les plus anciens écrits de Geiler de Kaysersberg: Todtenbüchlein, Beichtspiegel, Seelenheil, Sendtbrieff, Bilger, 1882 – The earliest writings of Johann Geiler von Kaisersberg.
- La Petite chronique de la cathédrale. : La chronique strasbourgeoise de Sébald Büheler, 1887 – The small chronicles of the Cathedral: The Strasbourg chronicles of Sebald Büheler.
