= Charlotte Roche =

British-German television presenter and author

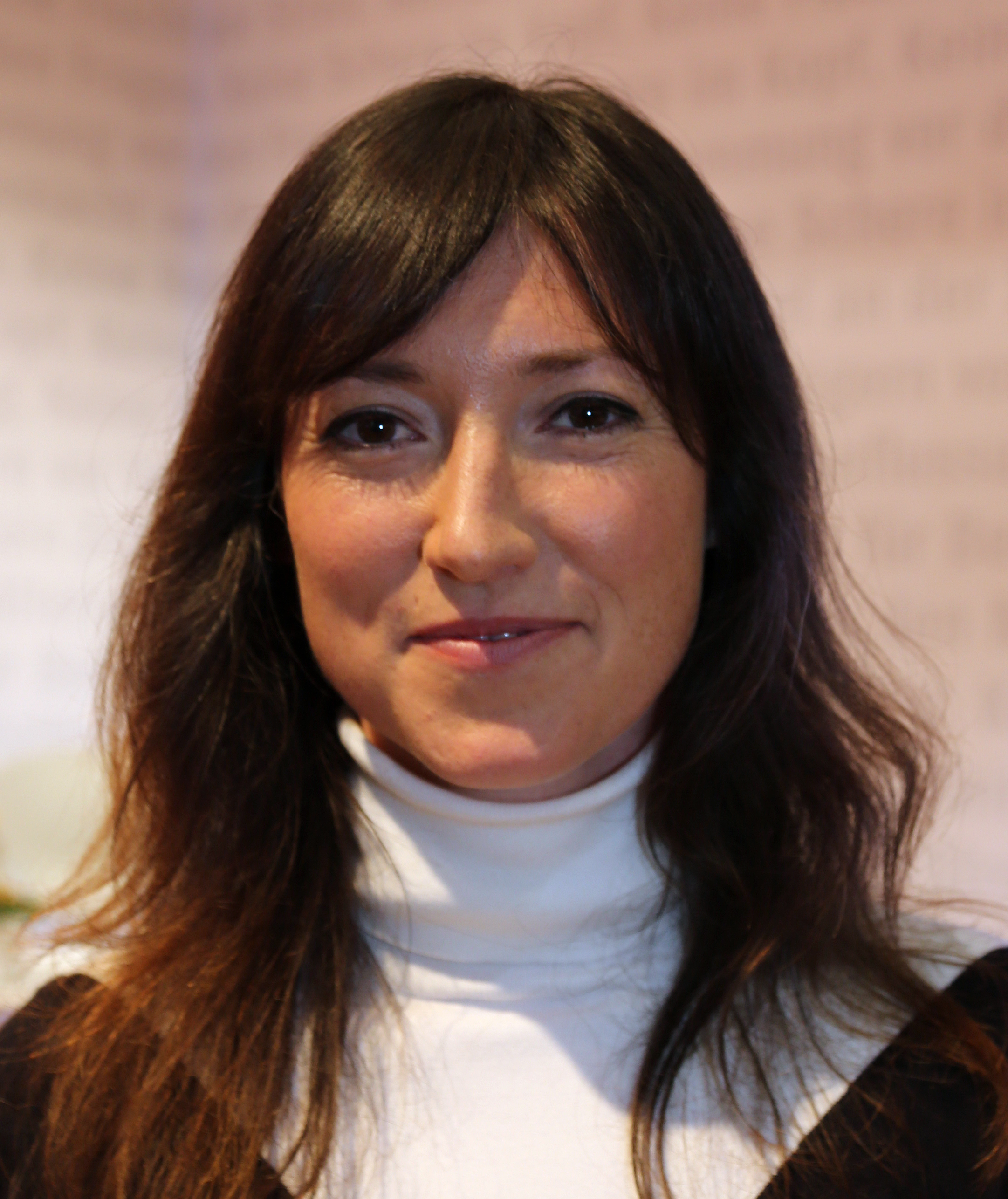
- Roche at the Frankfurt Book Fair 2015
- Born: Charlotte Elisabeth Grace Roche; 18 March 1978 (age 48); High Wycombe, England
- Occupations: Television presenter; author; producer; actress
- Years active: 1998–present
- Spouses: Eric Pfeil; Martin Keß (m. 2007)
- Children: 1

Charlotte Elisabeth Grace Roche (born 18 March 1978) is a British-German television presenter, author, producer, and actress. She is best-known for her 2009 novel Wetlands.

== Early life ==
Roche, the daughter of an engineer and a politically and artistically active mother, was born in High Wycombe near London and raised in Germany. In 1983, when Roche was five years old, her parents divorced, an event and experience that she later incorporated in her novels Feuchtgebiete (Wetlands) and Schoßgebete (Wrecked). She grew up at the Lower Rhine region, in a family with liberal views. Her primary school was in Niederkrüchten. In 1989, she went to the secondary school, St. Wolfhelm Gymnasium, in the neighbouring town of Schwalmtal. When she was 14 years old, she moved to Mönchengladbach, where she was educated at the Hugo Junkers Gymnasium in Rheydt. She left school after the 11th grade, at the age of 17. She obtained initial stage experience in drama groups during her time at school.

== Career ==
Roche left home in 1993, still aged 17, and formed the garage rock group The Dubinskis with three female friends. The band never released an album, nor recorded any material, nor notably performed anywhere. There followed a period where she undertook anything that would shock and offend people—self-mutilation to paint with blood, drug experiments, or shaving her head. After successfully auditioning for the German music channel VIVA, she worked there for several years as a video jockey and presenter, as well on the sister channel Viva Zwei, where she presented her show Fast Forward.

In 2006, Roche played the female lead in the German film Eden, directed by Michael Hofmann. The film was widely distributed in Europe. Also in 2006, Roche was featured on the single "1. 2. 3. ..." with German musician Bela B., from Bela's debut album Bingo.

In an interview published in Der Spiegel in 2010, Roche proposed to have sex with German president Christian Wulff in exchange for his veto on a new regulation extending the life of nuclear reactors, highlighting the controversial extension, and Wulff's role in passing it into law.

=== Writing ===
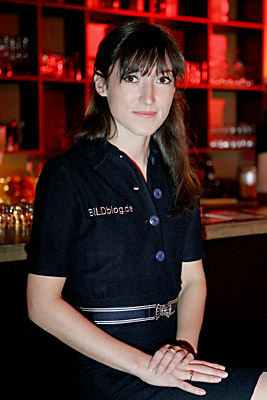
Roche during a reading in Berlin, 2007

Roche's book Feuchtgebiete (Wetlands) was the world's best-selling novel at Amazon.com in March 2008. Partly autobiographical, it explores cleanliness, sex and femininity, and had sold over 1,500,000 copies in Germany by early 2009. For supporters it is an erotic literary novel; for critics it is cleverly marketed shock-fiction bordering on pornography with a previously exhibited habit of the author of offense for the sake of offense.

Justin E. H. Smith wrote of the novel in a review in n+1: "If Roche has hit on something true and heretofore unsaid, it is the insight that to write about bodily fluids is not to describe something exceptional in the course of human life. It is, rather, to describe something that is always there and always felt to be there, through all those other things people do and experience at that level that used to be the subject of novels (falling in love, challenging others to duels, talking about the buying and selling of land, etc)."

Her second novel, Schoßgebete (Wrecked), was published in 2011. The novel makes reference to the death of her three brothers in 2001.

== Personal life ==
In 2001, Roche's three brothers were killed in a traffic accident on the way to her wedding.

Roche has a daughter born in 2002, whose father Eric Pfeil was the producer and writer of Roche's program Fast Forward and Der Kindergeburtstag ist vorbei! ("The children's birthday-party is over"). Since 2007, Roche has been married to Martin Keß, co-founder of Brainpool, a media-company in Cologne.

Living in Germany and fearing difficulties after the Brexit vote, Roche became a German citizen in 2017.

== See also ==
- Sex-positive feminism
