= Wetlands (novel) =

2008 novel by Charlotte Roche

- The cover of the first edition, February 2008
- Author: Charlotte Roche
- Original title: Feuchtgebiete
- Language: German
- Genre: Autobiographical novel, erotic novel
- Publisher: M. DuMont Schauberg (German); Grove Press (English)
- Publication date: 2008 (German); 2009 (English)
- Publication place: Germany
- Media type: Print (hardback) & audiobook
- Pages: 220
- ISBN: 978-3-8321-8057-7
- OCLC: 213398233

Wetlands (German: Feuchtgebiete) is Charlotte Roche's debut novel. Partly autobiographical, it was first published in German in 2008 by M. DuMont Schauberg and was the world's best-selling novel in March 2008. It has received a polarised reception due to its extremely graphic imagery. It was published in English as Wetlands by Grove Press in April 2009.

The title, which might be translated as "wetlands" or "damp areas", here refers to a woman's genitals.

== Plot ==
Set in an anonymous German city, Wetlands is told by 18-year-old Helen Memel, a schoolgirl who spends some days in the proctological ward of a hospital to be treated for an anal fissure caused by the careless shaving of her anal hair. Deep at heart Helen is lonely and bored, and has been so since the breakup of her parents' marriage. Her secret plan is to reunite her father and mother by having them visit her at the same time. However, her parents seem to have little interest in their daughter's well-being and show up only occasionally, only for short periods of time, and at different hours. When she learns that her surgery, which included the removal of haemorrhoids, has been successful and she is going to be released soon, she desperately looks for means to prolong her hospital stay.

She secretly rams the pedal of her hospital bed into her anus and immediate emergency surgery has to be carried out to prevent extreme blood loss. Thus having successfully extended her stay, she waits in vain for her miracle to happen: her parents have stopped visiting altogether, and when she tries to contact them by phone all she gets is their respective answering machines. During this time she falls in love with her favourite male nurse called Robin and tries to draw the young man into her world. At the end of the novel the doctor tells Helen she can go home and she asks Robin if she can go live with him. It becomes apparent that Helen is traumatized, following a childhood experience when her mother tried to commit suicide, although her narration may be unreliable. As the novel ends, Robin is escorting her through a door in the hospital.

== Major themes ==
The major part of Wetlands is made up of Helen's thoughts, reminiscences and sexual fantasies while confined to her hospital bed. A sexually active woman since she was fifteen, she has had sex with many men and boys and describes herself as continuously randy. Shortly after her 18th birthday she had herself sterilised without telling her parents about it.

Helen has an unusual relationship to her body. She abhors personal hygiene and enjoys many of the bodily fluids which are secreted or excreted from it, be it mucus, pus, earwax, smegma, blood (including menstrual blood), sweat, or tears, but also men's sperm, all of which she "recycles" by putting them into her mouth and swallowing them. She loves to attract potential sexual partners by parading, underneath her dress, her unwashed vulva and the smells emanating from it. In a series of interviews Roche explained that cleanliness and above all pedantic care for their own bodies, including the use of artificial scents such as perfume, have been inculcated upon women for ages; that this obstructs their—not just sexual—self-realisation; and that the fear of harmful "bacteria" has been vastly exaggerated.

Generally, Wetlands touches upon a number of taboo topics not only in the sexual arena but also those that can be found in the society at large, particularly in dysfunctional families. These include self-mutilation, amnesia triggered by recreational drug abuse, people's inability to deal with suicide attempts, and incest.

== Edition ==
In German:

- Charlotte Roche: Feuchtgebiete (DuMont: Cologne, 2008) (ISBN 978-3832180577) (18th edition as of August 2008).

In English:

- Charlotte Roche (2009). Wetlands, Grove Press, ISBN 0-8021-1892-5, ISBN 978-0-8021-1892-9, 208 pages. (Translator: Tim Mohr).

== Film adaptation ==
A film of the same name based on the novel, directed by David Wnendt and starring Carla Juri as Helen, premiered at the Locarno International Film Festival in August 2013.
