= Kim Wood =

American writer and filmmaker (born 1969)

Kim Wood (born June 23, 1969 in Hollywood, California) is an American writer and filmmaker.

== Works ==
Her work, based upon the histories of relatively unknown adventurers and eccentrics, includes the Sundance Film Festival premiered Advice to Adventurous Girls, and On My Knees, starring Melora Creager, based on the diaries of Hannah Cullwick.

== Awards ==
Wood has received the Silver Hugo from the Chicago International Film Festival and the Director's Citation from Thomas Edison's Black Maria Film Festival.

She is a recipient of grants from the Film Arts Foundation and the Jerome Foundation, and is a MacDowell Colony fellow.

== Festivals ==
Her work has screened internationally in festivals and museum exhibits, including the Guggenheim Museum's The Art of the Motorcycle, where she shared the bill with an episode of CHiPs.

== Filmography ==
- Wanderlust (1995)
- Advice to Adventurous Girls (1998)
- On My Knees (2003)
