= Arthur Munby =

British writer

Arthur J. Munby FSA
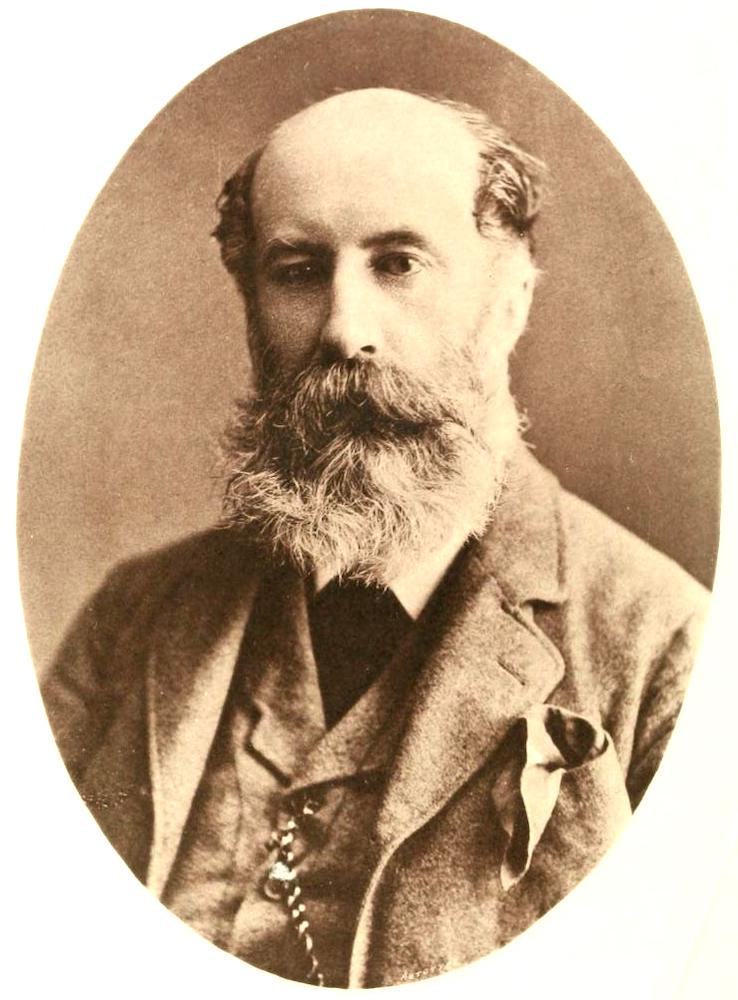
- Arthur J. Munby. Frontispiece to Munby's Vestigia Retrorsum: Poems (1892)
- Born: Arthur Joseph Munby; 19 August 1828; York, United Kingdom
- Died: 29 January 1910 (aged 81); Pyrford, United Kingdom
- Education: Trinity College, Cambridge
- Occupation: Barrister
- Spouse: Hannah Cullwick (married secretly in 1873)

Arthur Joseph Munby FSA (19 August 1828 – 29 January 1910) was a British poet, lawyer, and scholar. He held a fascination for female manual labourers which is documented in his diaries, drawings, and photographs; and was in a lengthy and fetishistic relationship with the maid Hannah Cullwick, whom he secretly married.

== Biography ==
Arthur Munby was born in York on 19 August 1828 to the solicitor Joseph Munby and Caroline Eleanor Forth. He was educated at St Peter's School, York and Trinity College, Cambridge, graduating with a BA in 1851, and was called to the Bar from Lincoln's Inn in 1855. Munby became a barrister in accordance with his father's wish, a traditional role for an eldest son in his class. He worked as a civil servant in the Ecclesiastical Commissioners' office from 1858 until his retirement in 1888.

Munby published several books of poetry, the first being Benoni (1852), and the second Verses New and Old (1865), a collection of magazine contributions. In 1880 came Dorothy, a country story, a long work of elegiac verse dedicated to R. D. Blackmore which won the praise of Robert Browning.

He was also a frequent contributor to Notes and Queries.

At the Working Men's College Munby taught Latin for more than a decade and helped promote the Working Men's College Volunteer Corps, a response to the national call in 1859 for Volunteer Rifle Corps in response to a perceived war threat from Napoleon III. Munby penned verses of support, the Invicta: a Song of 1860, for the 19th Middlesex Regiment, a regiment to which the W.M.C.V.C. was attached. In 1864, a sister Working Women's College was established; Munby was a leading spirit of the new college and taught there.

=== Relationship with female workers ===
Munby had an interest in working-class women, particularly those who performed hard physical labour. He strolled through the streets of London and other industrial cities and approached working women to ask about their lives and the details of their work, while noting their clothes and dialects.

He kept journals from 1859 to 1898 that recorded the details of his interactions and in them he expressed his desire for the strength and care of a working woman. He was an amateur artist, and his diaries contain sketches of working women. He collected hundreds of photographs of such subjects as women who worked at collieries, kitchen maids, milkmaids, charwomen, and acrobats. His diaries and images provide historical information on the lives of working-class Victorian women.

In 1854 Munby met Hannah Cullwick (b. 1833), a Shropshire-born maid-of-all-work who had been working in London since her late teens. They formed a relationship in which Munby was the master, whom Cullwick addressed as 'massa', and Cullwick the slave, with him training her in the virtues of hard work and loyalty. However, Cullwick used this master/slave dynamic to prove her own worth outside of Munby and put herself in a place of power. For example, she used the slave band Munby gave her to display the fact that she was a working-class woman, and that she was not ashamed of it; this can be seen in Cullwick’s journal when she says, "my hands and arms are tho' chief to me, to get my living with."

Munby and Cullwick experienced their roles differently. He once visited Cullwick at her workplace, where she is actually a servant. He wrote: "But to see her stand in a drawing room in her servant's dress and know that she is a servant and that the piano, the books, the pictures belong to her mistress... this I could not endure." She, on the other hand, enjoyed waiting on him when he stayed at an inn where she was working.

They married secretly in 1873, but Cullwick resisted his efforts to place her in the role of a Victorian wife of his class. She continued to play the role of his domestic servant and only took on the role of a wife and lady when they travelled to Europe. They separated in 1877, but continued to see each other and at times lived together until Cullwick's death in 1909. From 1887 onwards, the couple rented a cottage in the Shropshire village of Hadley, and they regularly spent time together. In 1903, they moved to Wyke Place in Shifnal, just a few metres from the house where she was born. Their landlord was her brother Jim Cullwick. Their marriage was kept secret from all but a few close friends and Munby revealed it to his brother only a few months before his own death from pneumonia in Pyrford, Surrey, on 29 January 1910.

His papers are housed at Trinity College, Cambridge. He required they remain sealed until the 77th anniversary of his wedding day in 1950.

One of Munby's best friends was Richard Monckton-Milnes, an aristocrat who collected sexual literature and wrote of sexual fetishes.

== Portrayals ==
Munby was portrayed by John Rowe in An Uncommon Love, an audio drama about his relationship with Cullwick by Michelene Wandor that was broadcast on BBC Radio 4 in 1984 and repeated on BBC Radio 4 Extra in 2025.

== Selected works ==
Benoni 1852
Prologue	Selene
Beginnings	The Eve of Change
Life is like a tear	A Scrap of Lyrics 1851
The Shadow of Death	Farewell
Passing Away	Glaucus
Despair	Be with us
The Poet's Bride	Patience
Scent and Jewels	A Surprise
St Mary's	Faith and Fancy
Irene	The Sea
Similies	The Preacher
Like to Like	Autumn
The Prisoners of Hope	Our Father
Be Still	Elegiacs
Isola Bella	The Mourning Mother
The Bride to come	Bethesda
O Sweet Sad Face	Work and Rest
Cloudland	Magdalene

Verses New And Old 1865
I. Of Men and Women Generally	III. Woman's Rights	VII. Of Decay and Death
Violet	IV. Auld Lang Syne	Vestigia Retrorsum
Under the Porch	V. Of Love in Various Aspects	In the Desert
The Whaler Fleet	Anamnesis	Nudum Remigio Latus
Ducie of the Dale	After Long Years	The Flyfisher
Shady Valley	Sonnet	In the Forest
Mary Anerley	Green and Dry	October
Romney Marsh	Queen Sophia	An Exception
Seamer Mere	A Parting	At Perivale
Casque and Plume	A Consolation	Autumn
Five-and-Thirty	A Talk on Filey Brig	N'importe
Doris	Seaside Questions	The Wolf
A Husband's Episodes	Lucy's Garland	In the Marshes at Landwick
II. Of Common Folk	A Jilt	Question and Answer
T' Moossel Gatherers	In Florence	One in Bedlam
T' Runawa Lass	VI. Of Irony	De Profundis
T' Statties	Longo Intervallo	
"Followers Not Allowed"	One Way of Looking at it	Six Farewells
The Serving Maid	Evander	
Maid Margery	Discipline	
Mary Ann	Lucinda's Story	
At Sempach	Post Mortem	
	The Poet Jobson	

Transcriptions

- Faithful Servants: being epitaphs and obituaries recording their names and services, 1891
  - Sometimes catalogued with J.W. Streeten as co-author. Munby did not collect all of the 692 epitaphs he published himself. His volume includes 311 epitaphs collected by Streeten which were published anonymously in 1826 in a volume titled Epitaphia.
