= Prussian National Monument for the Liberation Wars =

Monument in Berlin

National Monument for the Liberation Wars
- Nationaldenkmal für die Befreiungskriege
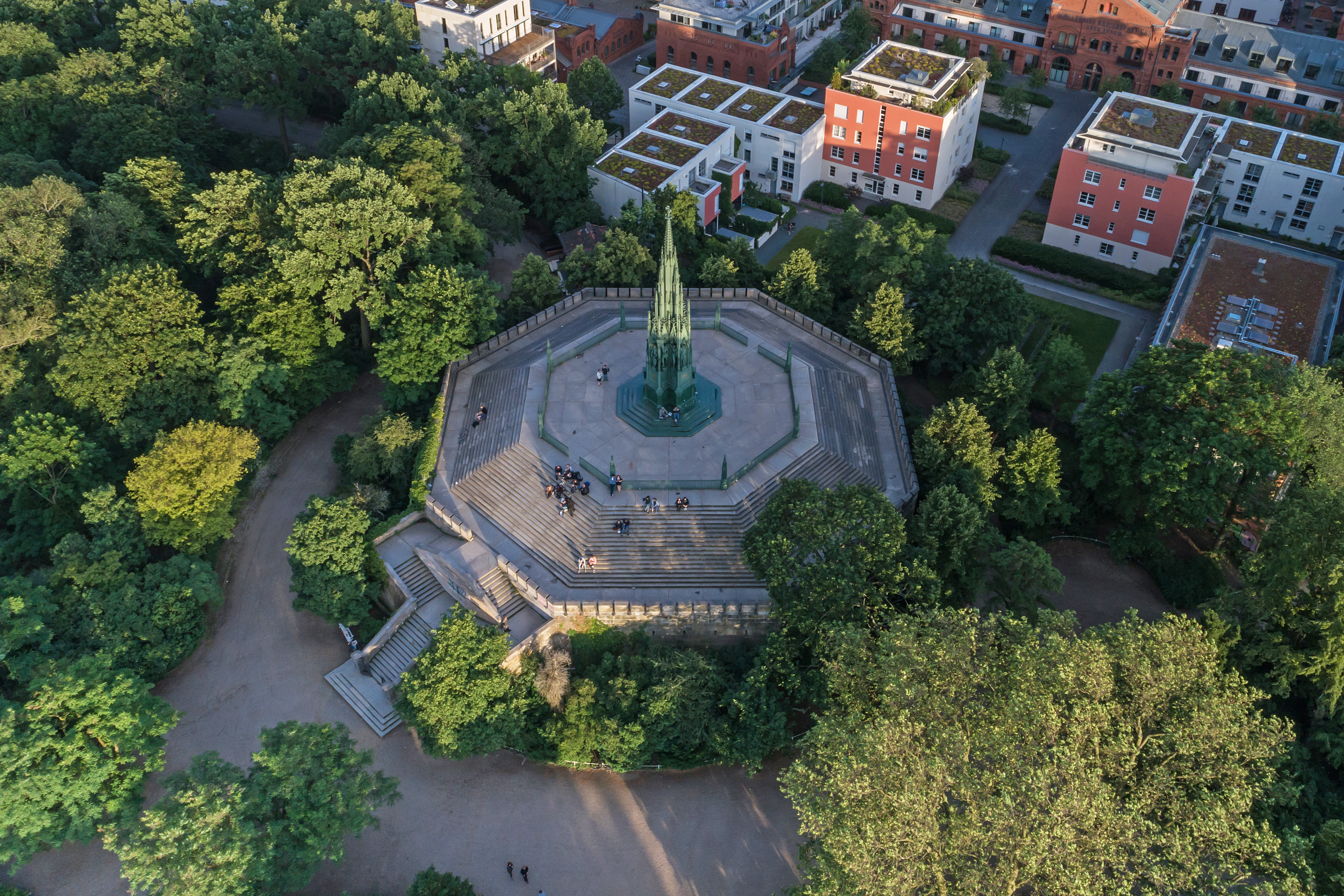
- Aerial view
- Interactive map of National Monument for the Liberation Wars
- Location: Kreuzberg, Berlin, Germany
- Coordinates: 52°29′15.64″N 13°22′53.39″E
- Designer: Karl Friedrich Schinkel
- Type: War memorial
- Material: Cast iron
- Height: 18.83 m (61.8 ft) + 8 m (26 ft) of socket
- Beginning date: 19 September 1818
- Completion date: 17 June 1826
- Opening date: 30 March 1821
- Dedicated to: People of Prussia

The Prussian National Monument for the Liberation Wars (German: Preußisches Nationaldenkmal für die Befreiungskriege) is a war memorial in Berlin, Germany, dedicated in 1821. Built by the Prussian king during the sectionalism before the Unification of Germany it is the principal German monument to the Prussian soldiers and other citizens who died in or else dedicated their health and wealth for the Liberation Wars (Befreiungskriege) fought at the end of the Wars of the Sixth and in that of the Seventh Coalition against France in the course of the Napoleonic Wars. Frederick William III of Prussia initiated its construction and commissioned the Prussian Karl Friedrich Schinkel who made it an important piece of art in cast iron, his last piece of Romantic Neo-Gothic architecture and an expression of the post-Napoleonic poverty and material sobriety in the liberated countries.

The monument is located on the Kreuzberg hill in the Victoria Park in the Tempelhofer Vorstadt, a region within Berlin's borough of Friedrichshain-Kreuzberg. The monument was conceived at a time of deteriorating relations between the reactionaries and the reformers of the civic movement within Prussia. The monument is of cast iron, a technique en vogue at the time. Its younger socket brick building is faced with grey Silesian granite and was designed by the Prussian architect Heinrich Strack and realised by the Prussian engineer Johann Wilhelm Schwedler. Its centerpiece is a tapering turret of 60 Prussian feet (18.83 m (61.8 ft)), resembling the spire tops of Gothic churches.

== Dedication ==
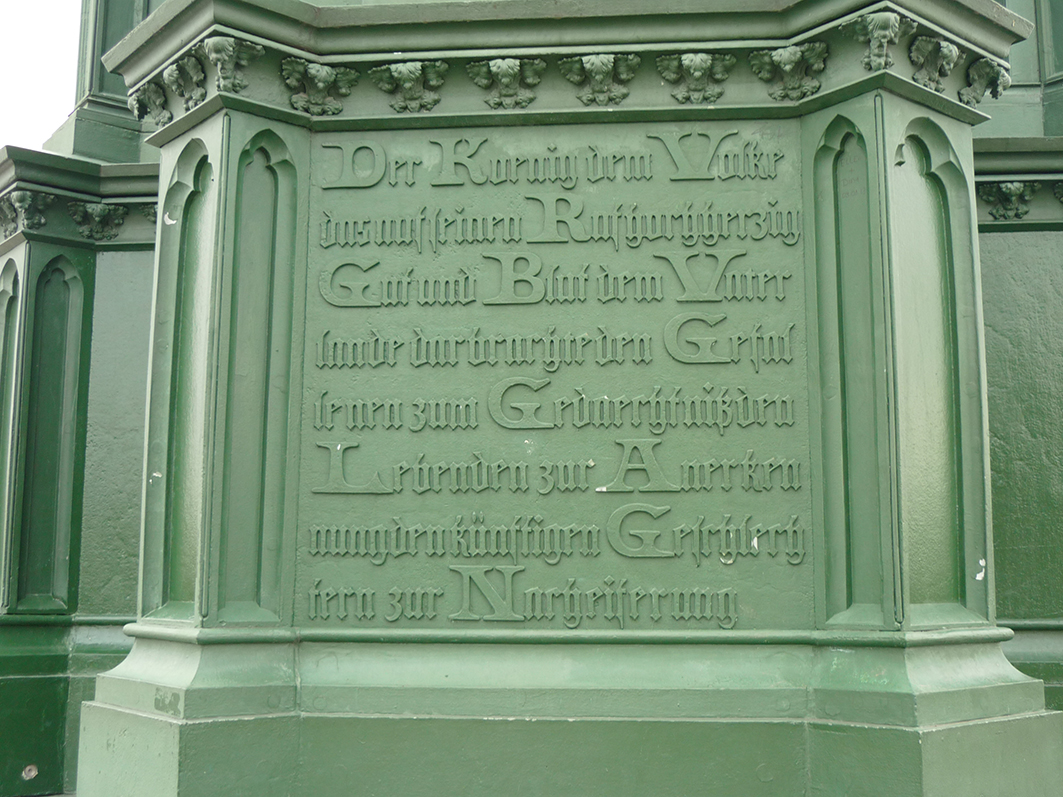
Der Koenig dem Volke

On the eastern side of the monument under the memorial inscription for the Battle of Großgörschen (aka Lützen) there is the dedication: "The King to the People, which at his call magnanimously offered its wealth and blood for the Fatherland, to the Fallen in memoriam, to the Living with acknowledgement, to Future Generations for emulation." This dedication was authored by August Boeckh, a member of the philosophical class of the Prussian Academy of Sciences commissioned to write it. Frederick William III had rejected three alternative proposals by the philosophical class. This dedication may be considered problematic, inasmuch as it was not the king who had called his people, but the stubborn people, commoners, lower-ranking bureaucrats, military men, and members of the nobility who had stolen a march on the king.

People who had earlier welcomed and benefited from Napoleon's reforms and who, like those in other nations had been inspired by his earlier "Republican" ideals of emancipating commoners as citizens, started to resist when he betrayed these ideals by making himself Emperor, levying burdensome compulsory contributions for his projects designed to aggrandize himself and his family, impoverishing not only his own people, but those of other nations, and above all bringing about the deaths of thousands in seemingly unending wars. At the same time the blocus, a measure against free trade, unfairly enforced favorable exchange rates of most European nations toward France while at the same time attempting to eliminate their far more profitable trade with Great Britain.

In 1813 the defeated and intimidated king, forced into a coalition with France since 1812, against the will of his people refused the risky attempt to shake off the French supremacy in the wake of Napoleon's defeats in Russia. Ludwig Yorck, commanding the Prussian units supporting the French, had declared their neutrality towards the Russians without royal accord. In early 1813 irregular units, guerrillas lacking royal sanction, began to form, swearing their allegiance to the German Fatherland rather than to the king. On 7 February 1813 the East Prussian estates unanimously voted for financing, recruiting, and equipping a militia army (Landwehr) of 20,000 men, plus 10,000 in reserve, out of their funds, following a proposal designed by Yorck, Clausewitz, and Stein. The hesitant king could not stop this anymore, but was forced to enact it on March 17 in his address entitled An mein Volk ("To My People").

However, this civic act of initiating Prussia's participation in the War of the Sixth Coalition was distasteful to the monarch, who again and again delayed implementing his promise of 22 May 1815 to introduce a parliament and a constitution for the entire kingdom. Rather, the monarchs allied against Napoleon subsequently granted themselves the right to suppress the rights previously granted to the citizens and to reverse all the reforms which had done away with feudalism. On 21 March 1819, Frederick William even forbade his subjects to address any further petitions for him to fulfill his promise. The reaction prevailed against the patriotic zeal of the populace.

== Alternative names ==
The ponderous officialese name evoked many alternative names developed for the monument. Other names are Nationaldenkmal zur Erinnerung an die Befreiungskriege/Freiheitskriege (i.e. national monument in memory of the liberation/liberty wars, a more extended version), Befreiungsdenkmal (i.e. liberation monument), Kreuzbergdenkmal (i.e. Kreuzberg monument, however, there are at least five more monuments on the Kreuzberg sparsed in Victoria Park, which covers most of that hill), Kriegsdenkmal auf dem Kreuzberge (war monument on the Kreuzberg, somewhat indifferentiated), National-Monument, Schinkeldenkmal (i.e. Schinkel monument, however, it is not a monument of Schinkel, but one by Schinkel), Siegesdenkmal (i.e. victory monument), Volksdenkmal auf dem Tempelhofer Berge (people's monument on the Tempelhof hill, however, it was the king's monument, with statues displaying the faces of many royal siblings, and the hill had been renamed by the king into Kreuzberg in 1821).

== Location ==
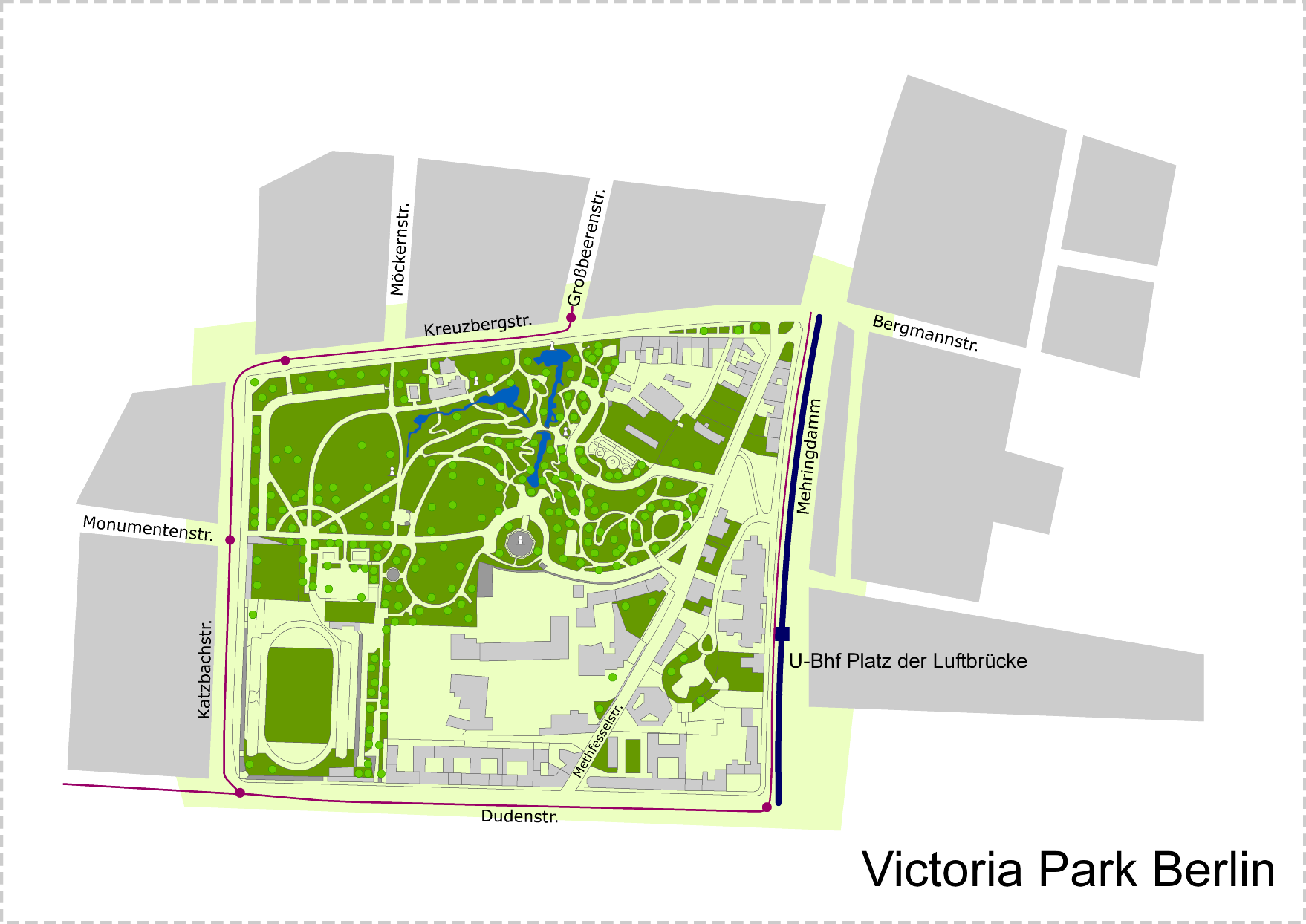
Map with the National Monument within the Victoria Park

The monument is located on the 66-metre-high (217 ft) top of the Kreuzberg in the Tempelhofer Vorstadt. Between 1888 and 1894 the Victoria Park (Viktoriapark) was laid out around the monument. The monument, topped by an iron cross, became name-giving for the hill it stands on, before mostly called Tempelhofer Berg, but also denoted by many other names in its history. Hundred years after the inauguration of the monument, the VIth borough of Berlin, established on 1 October 1920 and provisionally named Hallesches Tor, was renamed into Kreuzberg on 27 September 1921.

== History ==
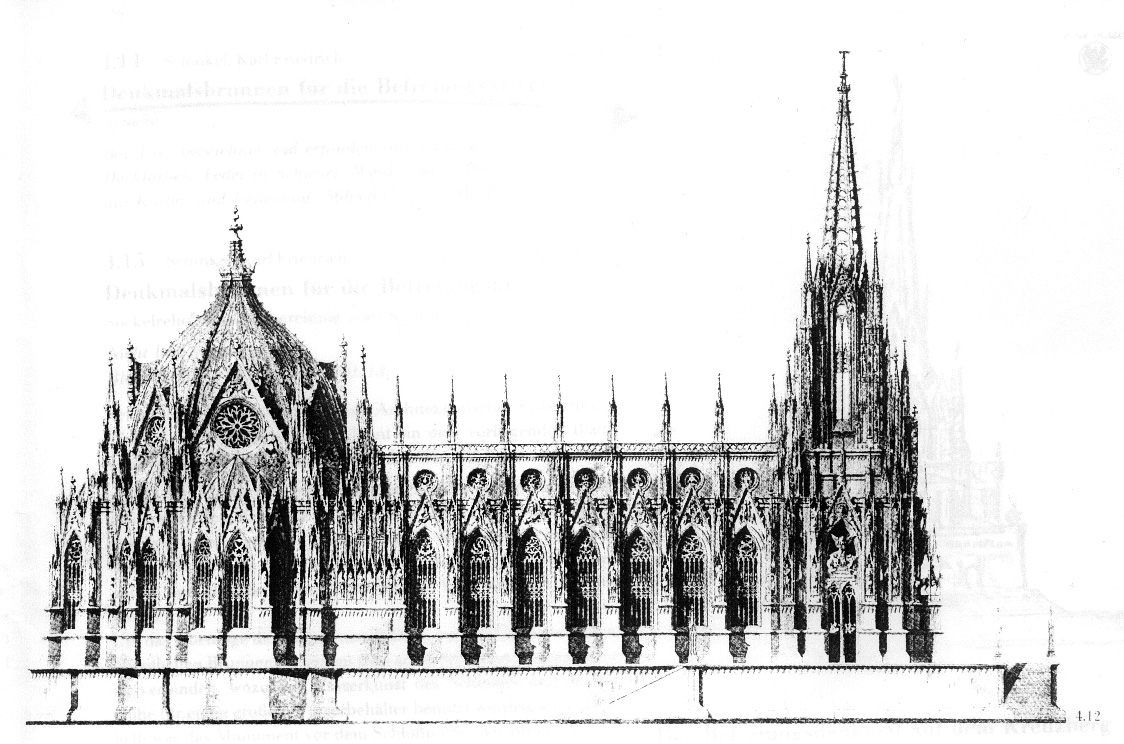
Schinkel's sketch for a memorial church.

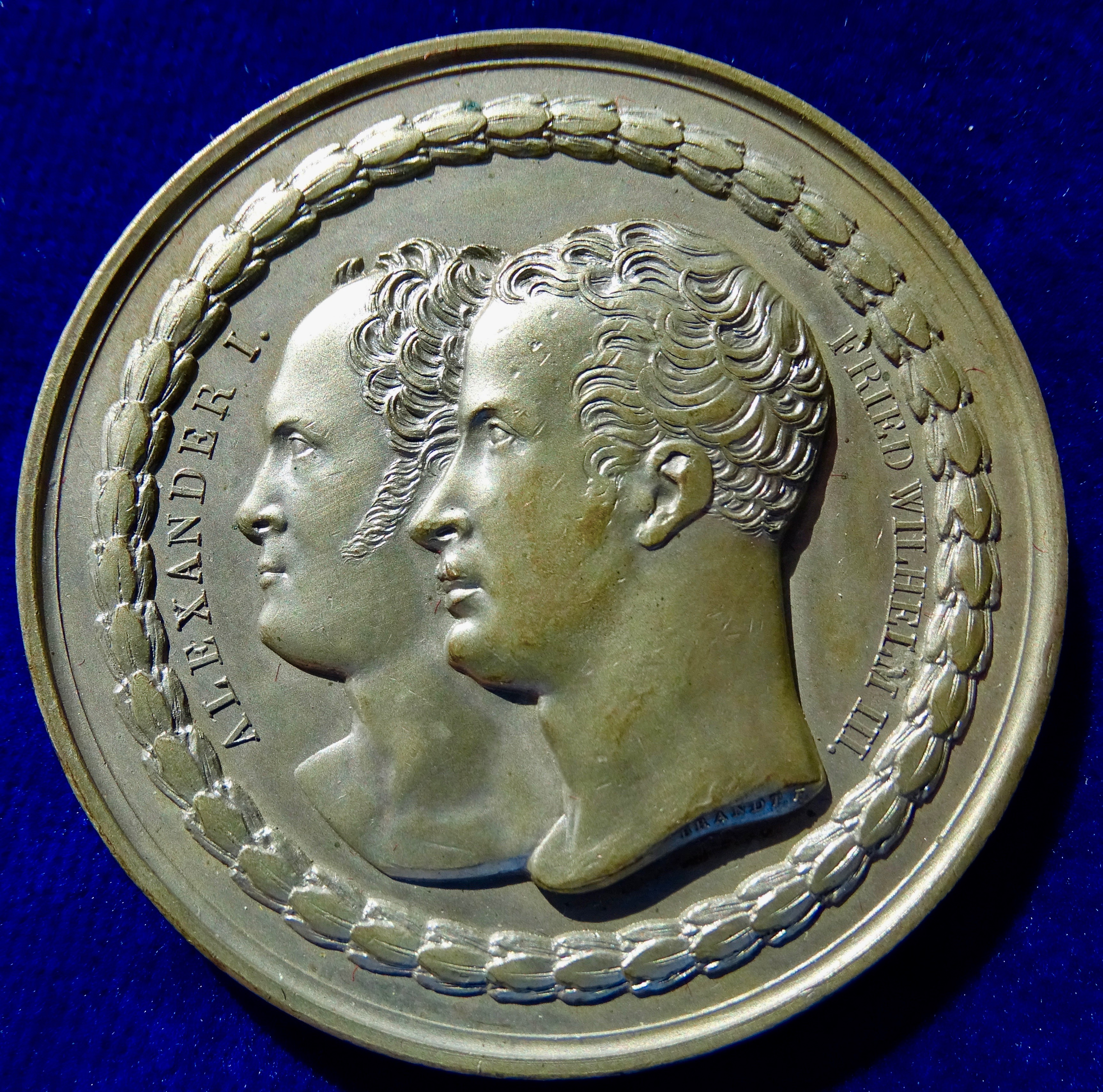
Berlin, Medal 1818 of Alexander I of Russia, and Friedrich Wilhelm III of Prussia laying the foundation stone in Berlin-Kreuzberg for the monument to commemorate the Wars of Liberation against Napoleon I.

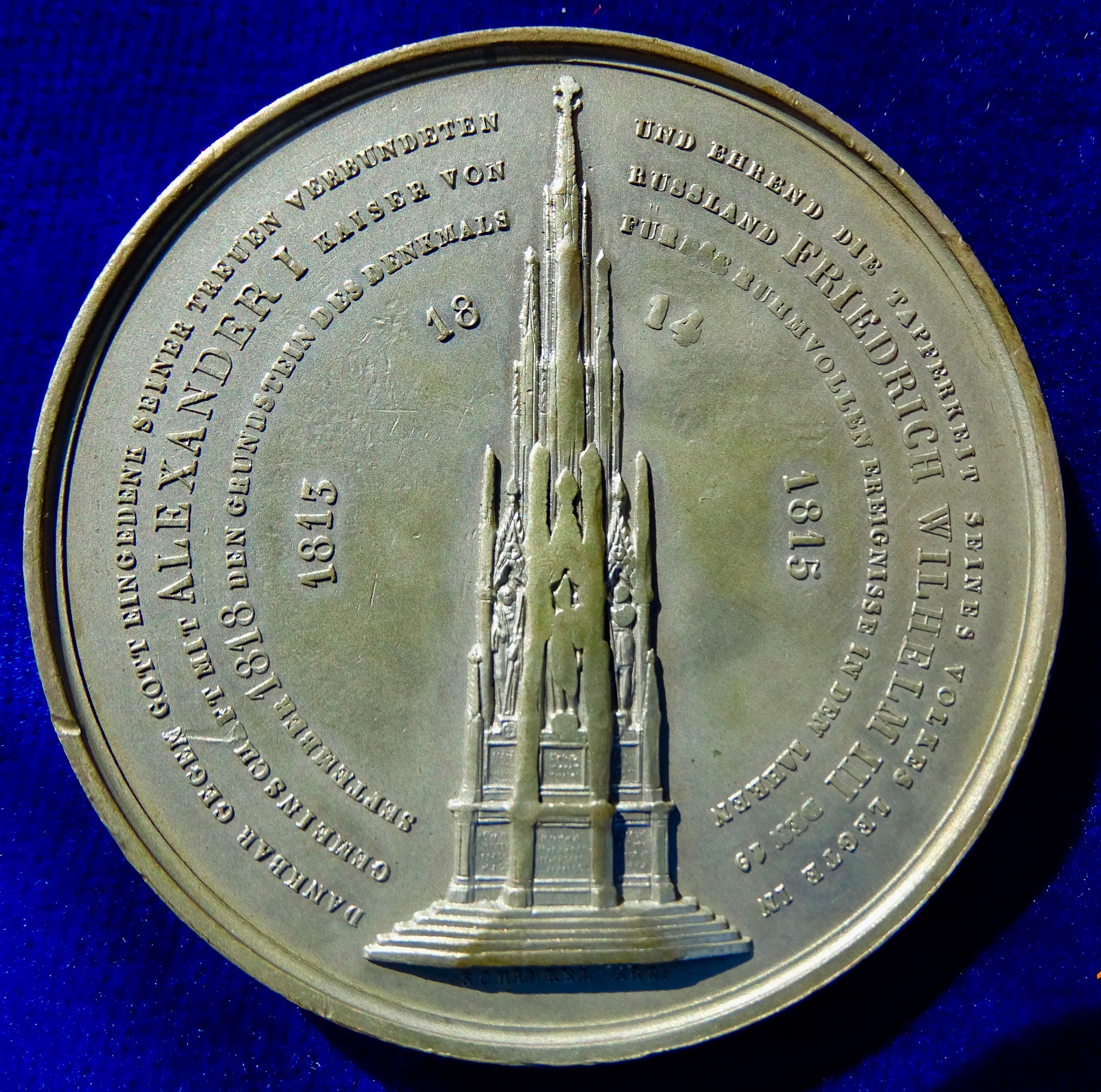
The reverse of this medal showing a medallic sculpture of the planned Berlin-Kreuzberg monument.

The monument by Karl Friedrich Schinkel has been called the «relatively modest outcome of grandiose plans». This is because the monument resembles the spire top of an earlier project by Schinkel, a national memorial church with the working title Nationaldom designed in summer 1814, and a second draft in January 1815. However, like many other projects the memorial church never materialised due to lacking money. The compulsory contributions to France (thaler 41.73 million [=154.5 million Francs] alone by the Treaty of Tilsit), levied during its supremacy, which Prussia could mostly only raise by way of credit from various creditors, French and of other nations, heavily weighed as debts to be amortised and serviced on the budgets of municipalities, cities, states and other corporations until the 1870s.

Already in late 1813 other projects for monuments had been launched by Ernst Moritz Arndt, Karl Sieveking, Johann Heinrich von Dannecker, Leo von Klenze, Friedrich Weinbrenner. Schinkel considered for his project to ask the magistrate (city government) of Berlin to build a memorial. So like jumping the ship also the initiative for a war memorial did not originate with the king.

On 17 March 1813, when the king had jumped on the bandwagon for the liberation wars, he established the military decoration of the Iron Cross, backdated to March 10, late Queen Louise's birthday. He commissioned Schinkel to design the Iron Cross after a royal sketch. The Iron Cross was a decoration of a new kind, available for every soldier, who had turned from subjects of different estate status into citizens by the establishment of the Prussian citizenship in 1810, therefore there were no status barriers to get the Iron Cross.

On 26 June 1818 Schinkel commissioned the Royal Prussian Iron Foundry (Königlich Preußische Eisengießerei) to cast the pieces for the monument, including its statues. The foundry estimated costs of thaler 20,646. After negotiations on 27 August 1818 the merchant Gottfried Wilhelm August Tietz, the farming burgher Johann Friedrich Götze and Christian Weimar (Weymann) sold the top of the Götze'scher Berg (today's Kreuzberg) measuring 1.5 Prussian Morgen (2,839.83 m^{2} (30,567.7 sq ft)) and an access road branching off from Methfesselstraße. On 4 September 1818 the king approved the stipulated price of thaler 1,100 and an additional 400 as compensation for fixtures. The adjacent land, measuring 72 Morgen (18.38 ha (45.4 acres)), remained property of Götze, Tietz and Weimar. The king confirmed the price.

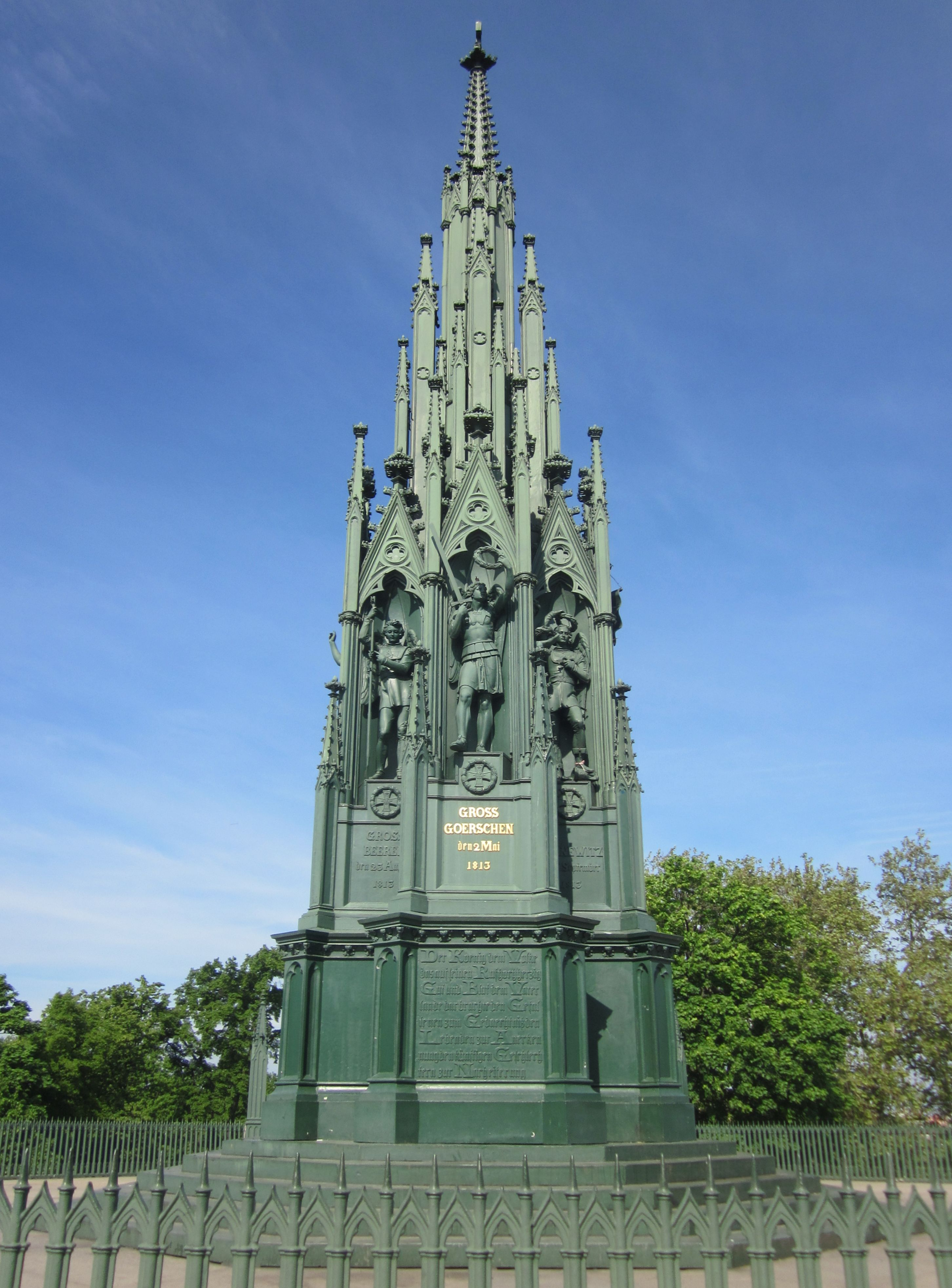
The Prussian National Monument for the Liberation Wars

Duke Charles of Mecklenburg arranged the laying of the foundation stone for 19 September 1818, attended - among others - by Tzar Alexander I, Christian Daniel Rauch and Schinkel. An iron cast memorial medal was issued on that occasion and the proceeds were used for war invalids. A bit northeast of the monument, deeper on the slope thus not blocking the view, a guard's house was erected after Schinkel's design in 1821. It was a brick structure in Gothic Revival style adorned with a Lombard band all around beneath the eaves of the flat pyramidal roof. On 1 January 1822 the invalid Martin Herborn moved in, employed to guard the monument. By the end of the 19th century a milk bar (Milchkuranstalt) moved in. The abandoned building was demolished in the 1950s, its site is now used by a ball playing cage.

For the inauguration of the monument Frederick William III chose the 30 March 1821, the seventh anniversary of the conquest of the Montmartre in the Battle of Paris. The inauguration was attended by the royal family, the Prussian generality, the senior pastors of all Protestant congregations of Berlin, and as guests by Grand Duke Nicholas of Russia and his wife Alexandra Feodorovna (Charlotte of Prussia), as well as by thousands of other spectators. Court preacher Bishop Rulemann Friedrich Eylert held an inaugural prayer.

The national monument is crowned by an Iron Cross. On the occasion of the inauguration the king renamed Götze'scher Berg into Kreuzberg (i.e. cross mountain) after the Iron Cross topping the monument. The monument is adorned with twelve statues symbolising twelve major battles of the Liberation Wars, however, at the inauguration only two of the statues had been installed, and two others were represented by plaster models painted like cast iron. On December 27 altogether six statues had been installed, the other followed over time (two on 15 January 1823, one on 22 December 1823, another on 10 March 1825, on 17 June 1826 the last two. The monument's front side was directed northeastwards to the Hallesches Tor (Halle Gate).

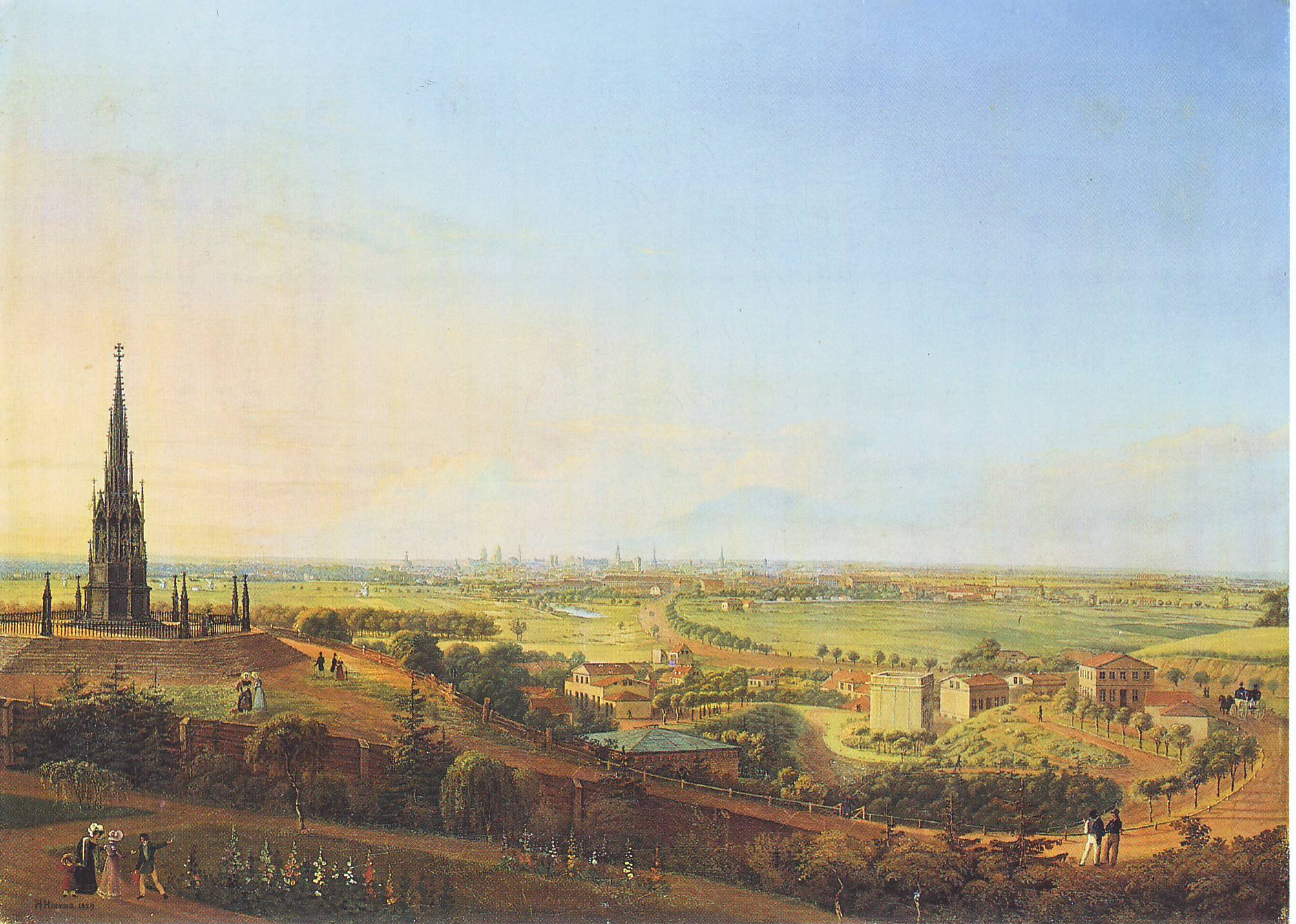
View with the monument and the greyish-turquoise pyramidal roof of the guard's house (lower centre), 1829 by Hintze

On 1 December 1829 Frederick William III asked Schinkel for proposals how to improve the visibility of the monument. Schinkel's ideas, a socket or an encircling structure were never realised. Schinkel had proposed to enlarge the tiny monument's plot (a radius of 53 Prussian feet; 16.634 m (54.57 ft)) by buying an additional circular spread of 150 to 200 Prussian feet (47.08 to 62.77 m (154.5 to 205.9 ft)) around the monument, however, all rejected as too costly. The southerly adjacent land had meanwhile been bought by the Gericke brothers, who planned to develop the area and opened the amusement park Tivoli right south of the monument. On 6 August 1848 people gathered at the monument demonstrating for the unification of Germany, rendering homage to Archduke John of Austria as regent of the to-be-unified Empire, flagging the monument with the union tricolour of Black-Red-Gold, much opposed by the various Prussian nationalist formations.

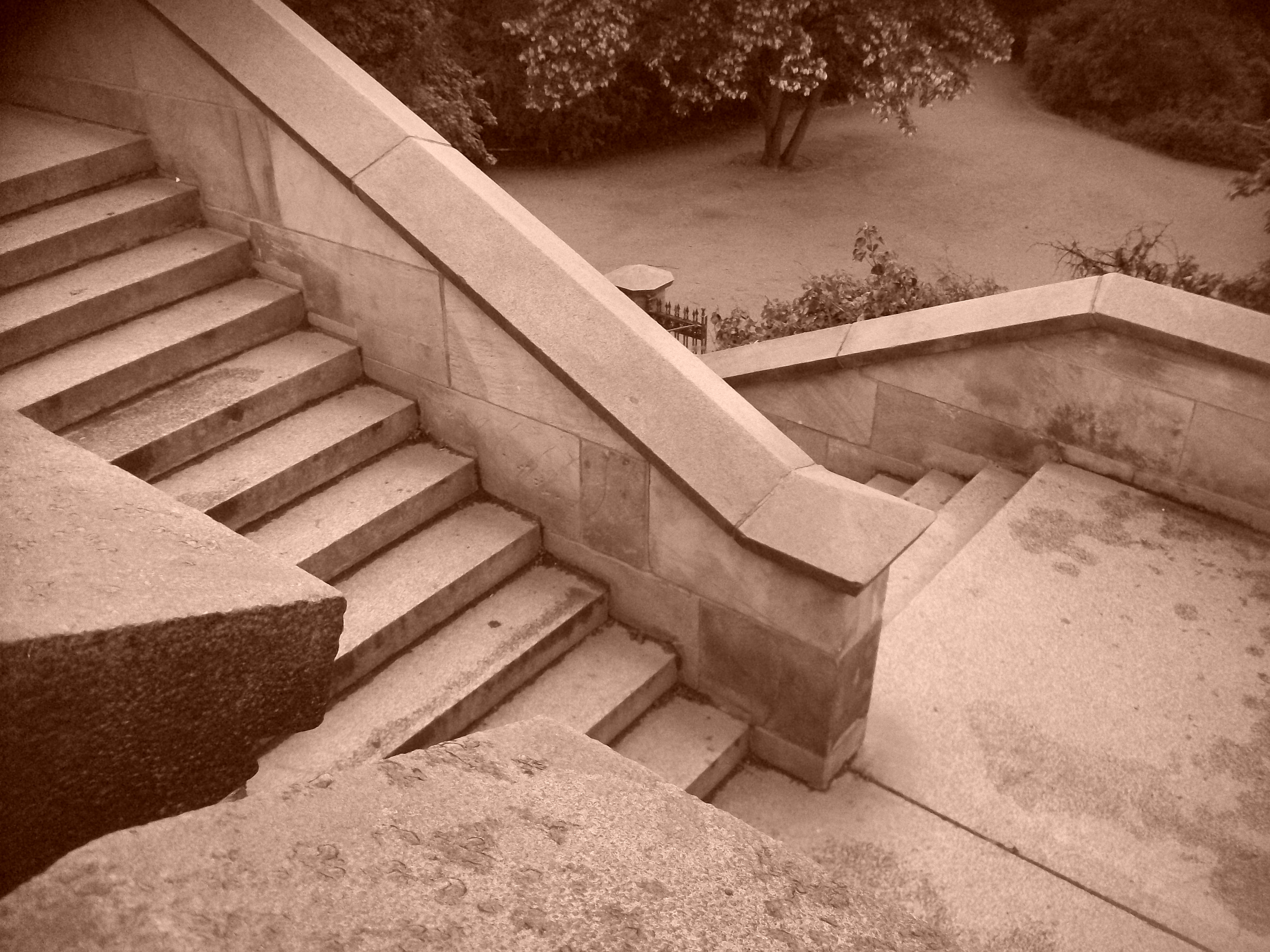
Strack's outside staircase

Between 1857 and 1859 Tivoli brewery established on the site of the former amusement park south of the monument and its access from Methfesselstraße.

In 1875 Johann Heinrich Strack proposed a socket building to elevate the monument, and King William I of Prussia, in personal union also German Emperor, ordered its realisation in 1878. Johann Wilhelm Schwedler carried out the plans. On 29 August 1878 he elevated the monument, weighing 3,800 Zentner (1,900 kilograms (4,200 lb)), with hydraulical pumps. On 3 September the monument was turned by 21° with its front into the axis of the Großbeerenstraße, before on 25 October the monument was set to rest on the new socket building. The octagonal, 8-metre-high (26 ft), crenellated bastion-like socket building is adorned with Silesian granite and sandstone covering the brick substructures. A northerly outside staircase provides the access to the elevated level. However, Strack's projected flight of stairs from the monument all the way down to Großbeerenstraße was again refused as too costly.

In 1879 Guido von Madai, president of the royal police, decreed a maximum height of buildings in the adjacent streets to uphold the visibility of the monument. The ordinance, however, was annulled by the groundbreaking 1882 "Kreuzberg judgement" of the Prussian Royal administrative court, stating that the police had exceeded its authority to ensure public security. On 14 December 1887 the city of Berlin acquired 8.5 hectares (21 acres) of unbuilt land from several owners, mostly north and west of the monument. Right adjacent to the south the brewery (merged into Schultheiss in 1891), and in the east and northeast villas remained. On 28 June 1888 the city parliament decided for City Garden Director Hermann Mächtig's design for Victoria Park, including a waterfall between monument and Großbeerenstraße.

The monument was included in the Nazi plans for rebuilding Berlin, but only preparations materialised. Ernst Sagebiel oriented his Tempelhof Airport building towards the monument so that the central hall's front on the forecourt of the airport and one edge of the monument's octagonal groundplan are parallel. As seen from the monument today's Platz der Luftbrücke in front of the airport opens as a square, encircled by buildings of similar heights except for the taller central hall of the airport (mostly realised). The then planned axis consisting of a promenade and series of waterfalls cascading down the Kreuzberg hill towards the square was never realised, the interjacent block of houses remained untouched.

In 1944 British bombing left behind a wake of devastation leading from one block north up the Großbeerenstraße, over the waterfall to the monument, blasting away the southern edge of the octagonal socket structure then used as a safe place for casts of various sculptures, such as the Quadriga of the Brandenburg Gate. Also the villas northeast of the monument were destroyed. The casts were relocated from the open socket building in the late 1940s.

In November 1958 the smashed southern edge of the socket octagon was reconstructed. Starting in 1979 the monument was renovated and reopened on 31 October 1986 before the 750th anniversary of the first mention of Berlin in 1987. It underwent a thorough restoration between 1995 and 2000. The brick building of an abandoned public toilet was refurbished and opened in 2011 as a little café.

== Design ==
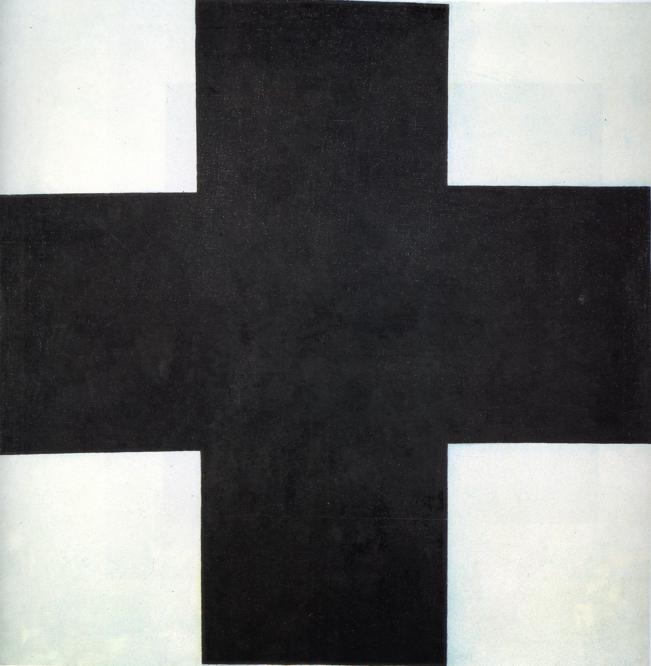
A Greek cross resembling the groundplan of the monument with its arms being of equal length but shorter than the width of their ends

It is said that due to the influence of Crown Prince Frederick William (IV) Schinkel's design in Gothic Revival style prevailed over another in rather classicist forms. The monument was decided to be made from cast iron. The Royal Prussian Iron Foundry, renowned for its Berlin Iron Jewellery (Eisenkunstguss, Fer de Berlin) produced all the parts of the monument. Frederick William III popularised cast iron by using it himself for decoration and table ware.

The groundplan of the monument is a Greek cross with its arms being of equal length but shorter than the width of their ends. Its twelve edges are each dedicated to one battle of the Liberation Wars. The somewhat wider ends of the four arms are reserved for the four main battles with golden inscriptions. Each of the twelve outward edges bears an inscription with the name and date of the battle topped by a little socket displaying an Iron Cross. Above each socket is a niche with the iron cast statue of a genius symbolising with their decoration and accessories the respective battle. The niches are in the actual structure of the monument tapering off to the top crowned again by an Iron Cross.

Originally Christian Daniel Rauch and Christian Friedrich Tieck had been commissioned to design and model each six statues. However, both were too busy and partially not in Berlin so that the creation of the statues was always on delay. Therefore, Ludwig Wilhelm Wichmann was additionally appointed to model some of the genii after Rauch's and Tieck's designs. As a guideline for the designs of the genii Schinkel recommended frescos by Pietro Perugino in the audience hall of the Collegio del Cambio in Perugia.

=== Table of the genii ===
The informations in the table follow Nungesser. The table starts with the genius shown on the front side, first seen when arriving on the monument platform, and then continues clockwise:

Inscription	Picture	Statue	Design by	Modelled by	Face resembling
Battle of Nations at Leipzig, 18 October 1813	centre	Genius in ancient Greek armour, crowned with an aureole, his left resting on a shield with the coats of arms of the three allies Prussia, Austria and Russia (l.t.r.), his right pointing to the coats of arms of the three allies	Rauch	Wichmann	Prince William (1783–1851), brother of the king
Battle of Dennewitz, 6 September 1813	right	Genius in the armour of a Landwehr soldier, in his left a sword held in front of his breast, in his right a laurel wreath held above his head	Rauch	Wichmann	Baron Friedrich Wilhelm von Bülow, elevated to Count of Dennewitz
Battle of Culm, 30 August 1813	left	Genius in the shape of Hercules, wearing the hide of the Nemean lion, leaning with his left on the club, resting on the head of the Cretan bull, looking onto the laurel wreath held in his right	Tieck	Wichmann	King Frederick William III
Battle of Großgörschen (aka Lützen), 2 May 1813, with the king's dedication inscription below	centre	Genius in ancient Greek armour with a sword and a laurel wreath	Tieck	Wichmann	nobody, or Landgrave Leopold of Hesse-Homburg, killed in that battle, brother-in-law of William (1783–1851), according to different sources
Battle at the Katzbach near Wahlstatt, 26 August 1813	right	Genius in ancient Greek armour with a laurel wreath in his hands	Wichmann		Gebhard Leberecht von Blücher, elevated to Prince of Wahlstatt, as a young man
Battle of Großbeeren, 23 August 1813	left	Youthful genius in Landsturm armour, with Berlin's coat of arms on his breast armour, his lance with sprouting laurel leaves rammed into the ground	Tieck		Prince Frederick William (IV), son of the king
Battle of La Belle Alliance (aka Waterloo), 18 June 1815		Genia in a tunic, symbolising the Peace of Paris as the fruit of this last battle, her right lifted, her left holding an olive branch, on the vertical hem of the tunica miniatures of all the other eleven genii	Rauch		Tzarina Alexandra, daughter of the king
Battle of Laon, 9 March 1814	right	Genius in old German armour and cloak, stabbing a dragon cranking beneath his feet	Tieck		Prince William (1783–1851), brother of the king
Battle of Bar-sur-Aube, 27 February 1814		Youthful genius in ancient Greek armour with a lance and a shield with the Prussian coat of arms	Wichmann		Prince William (I), son of the king
Battle of Paris, 30 March 1814	centre	Genia, laureated, in her left a scepter topped by an Iron Cross within a laurel wreath and with a Prussian eagle on top, in her right the quadriga of the Brandenburg Gate, the recaptured war booty of the French, quadriga, wreath with cross and eagle not in iron, but in bronze	Rauch		Queen Louise, the consort
Battle of La Rothière, 1 February 1814	centre	Genius in Nordic armour, striding forwards, in his left a laurel branch, his right erected	Rauch	Wichmann	Alexander I, Tsar of all the Russias
Battle of Wartenburg, 3 October 1813	left	Genius in ancient Greek armour, stepping into a bark as part of a bridge of boats, waiving the Prussian banner	Rauch	Wichmann	Ludwig Yorck, elevated Count of Wartenburg, where he crossed the Elbe by a pontoon bridge

== Other Prussian Monuments for the Liberation Wars ==
Since early 1817 a series of, partially pyramidal, war monuments, each topped by an Iron Cross had been already realised in Großbeeren, Dennewitz, Großgörschen, at the Katzbach near Wahlstatt (all in 1817), as well as in Haynau and La Belle Alliance (both in 1818). The National Monument for the Liberation Wars, though built later than the others, was considered the mother of all other earlier memorials for the Liberation Wars, More monuments for the Liberation Wars topped by an Iron Cross, not always from cast iron, but sandstone followed in Greifswald, Krefeld, Minden, Elsfleth, Breslau and on the Drachenfels (1857).

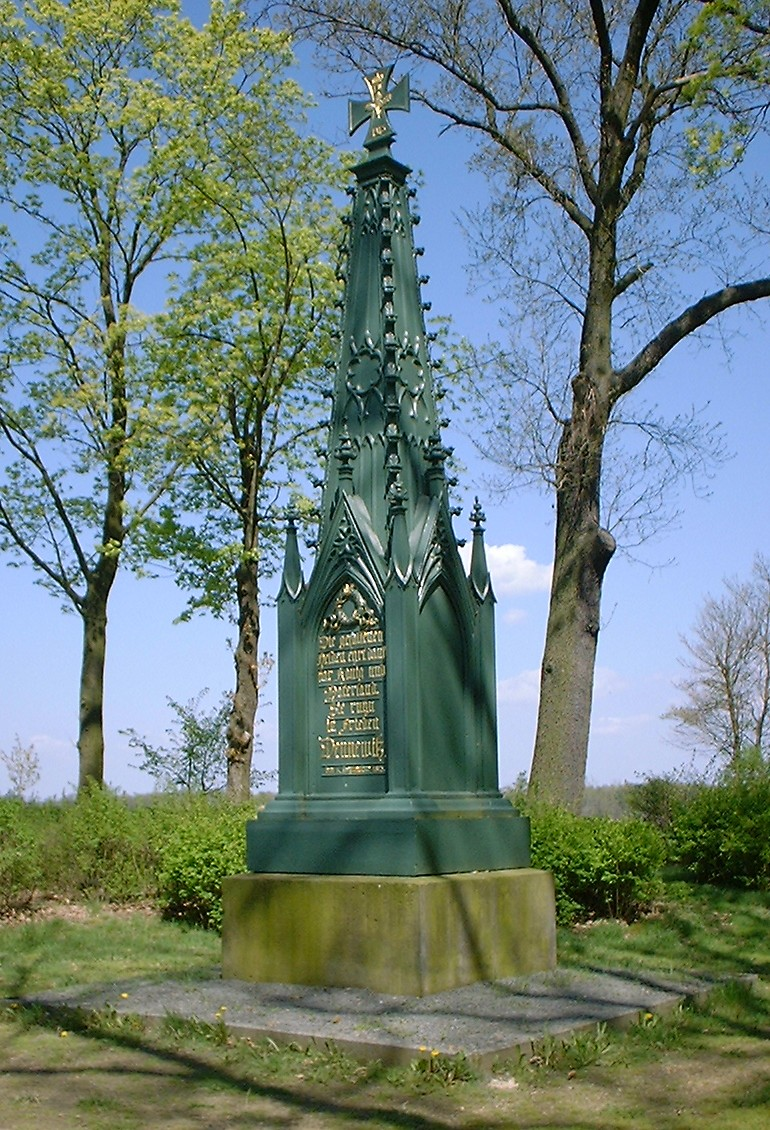
Dennewitz, monument by Schinkel

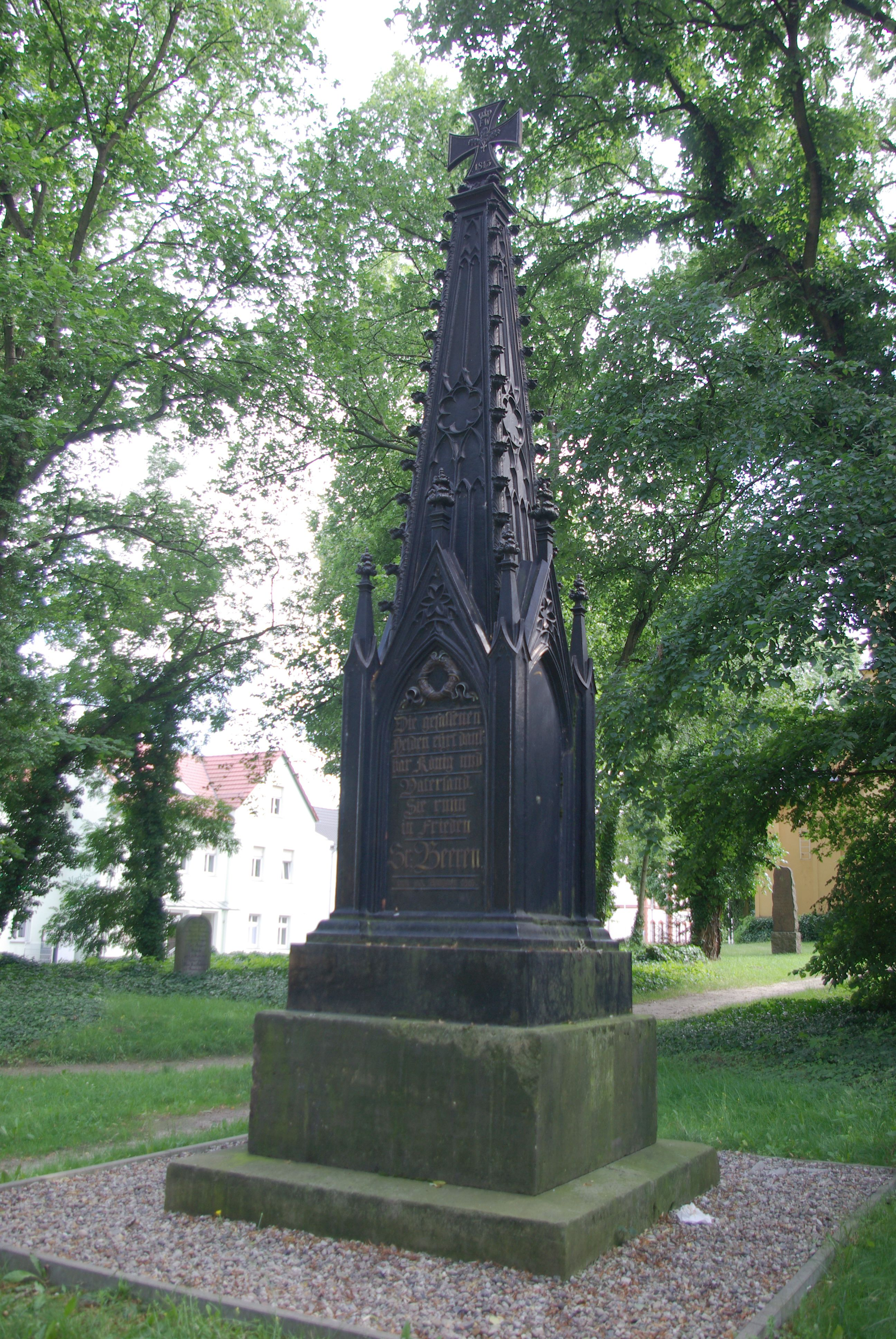
Großbeeren, monument

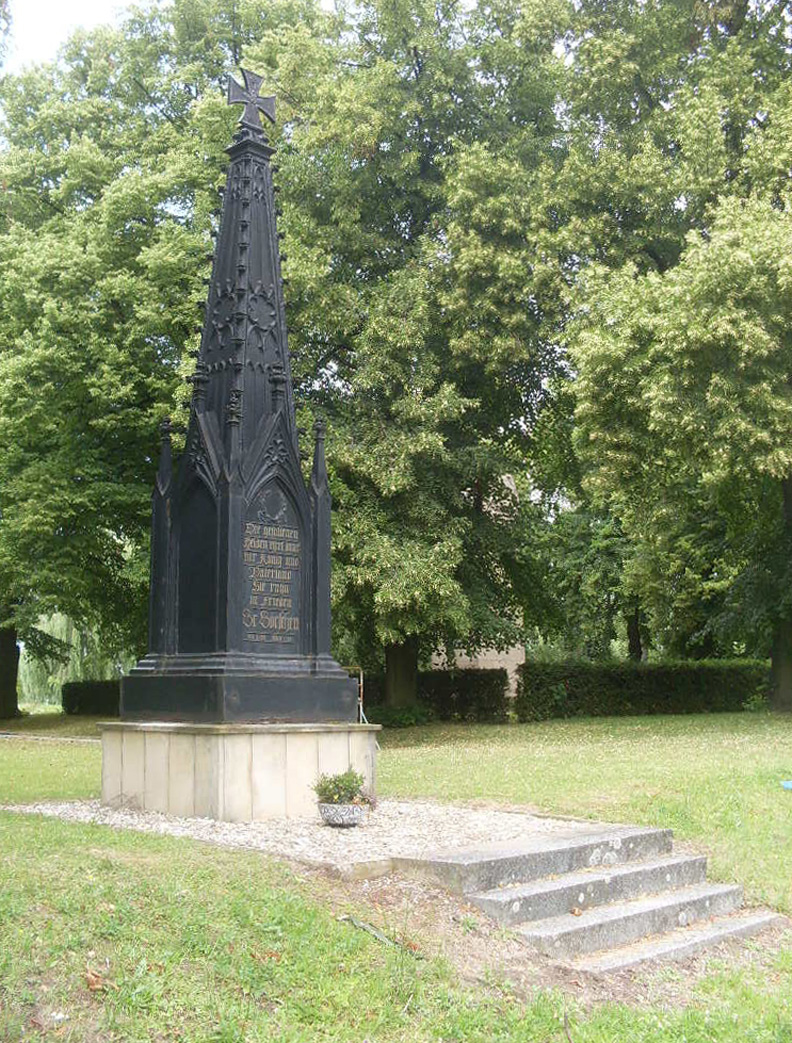
Großgörschen, monument

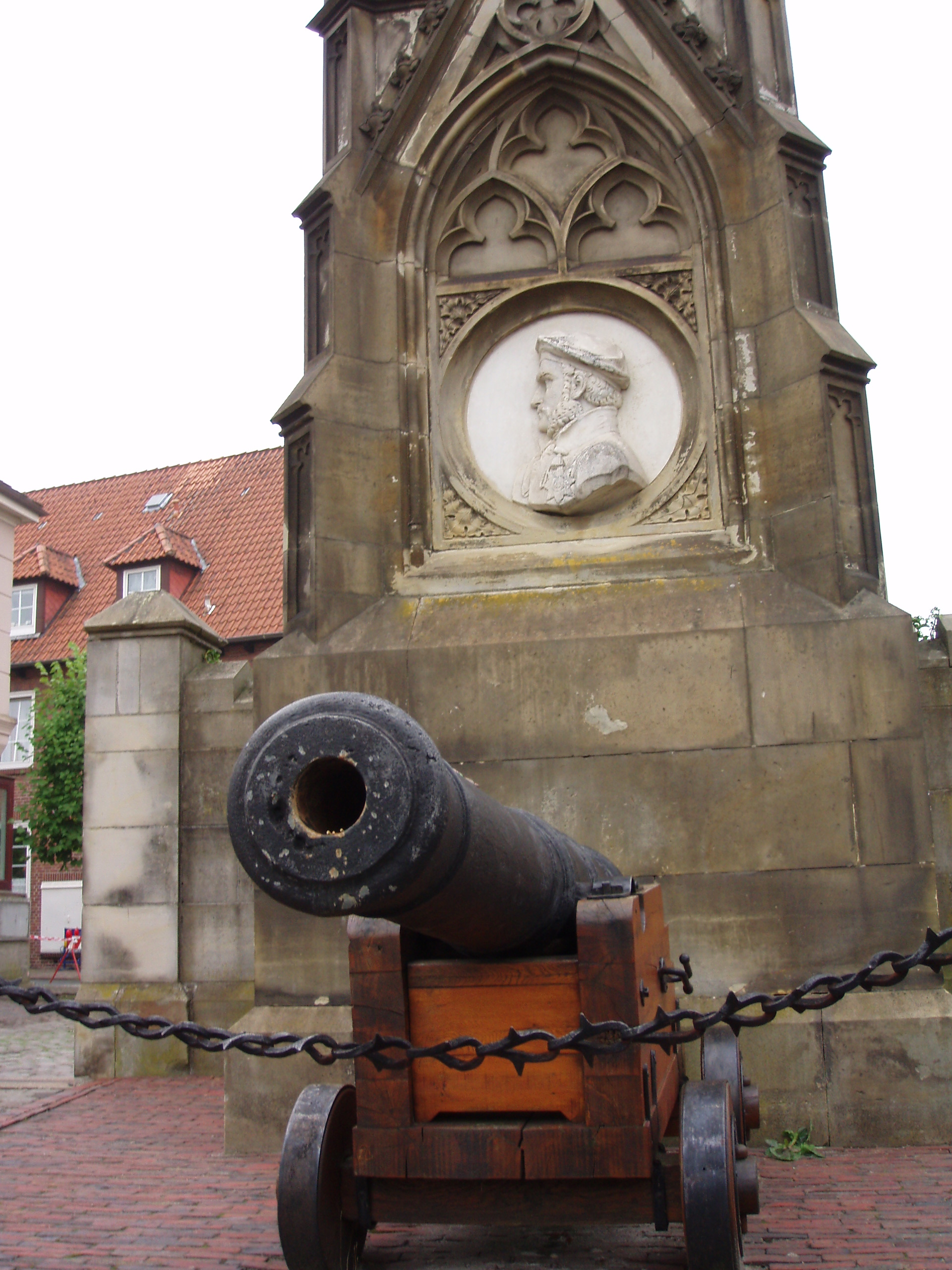
Elsfleth (in Oldenburg was never part of Prussia, but influence in design is visible)

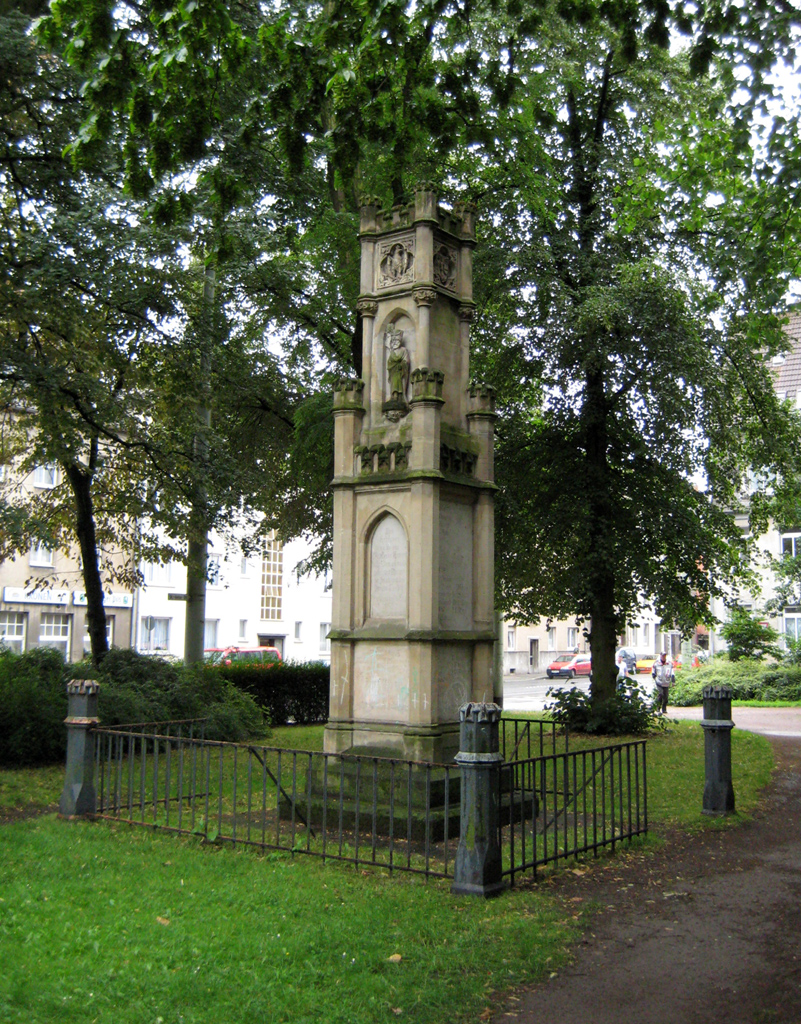
Krefeld, monument (8 August 1852)

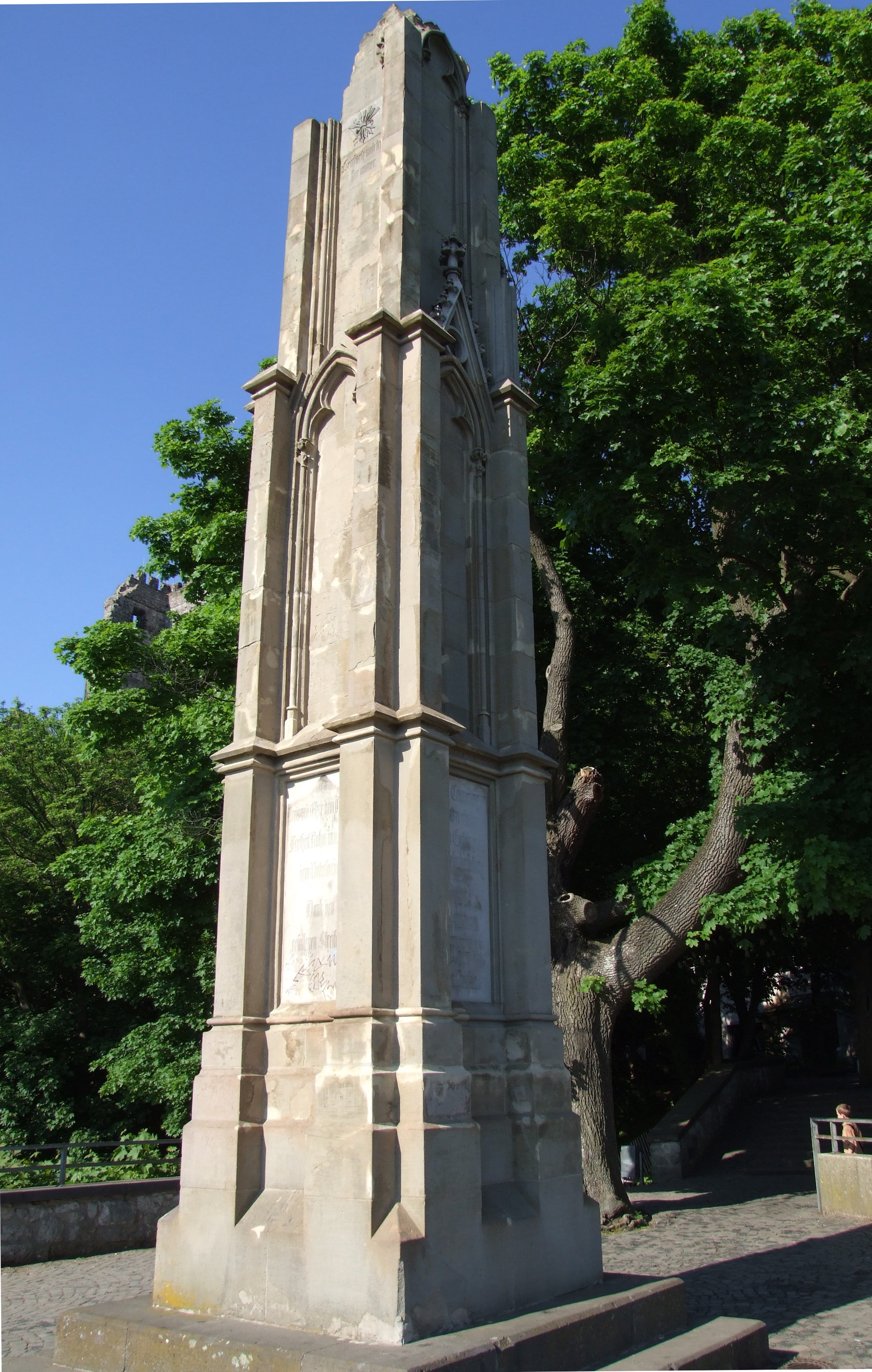
Drachenfels, Monument for the Liberations Wars

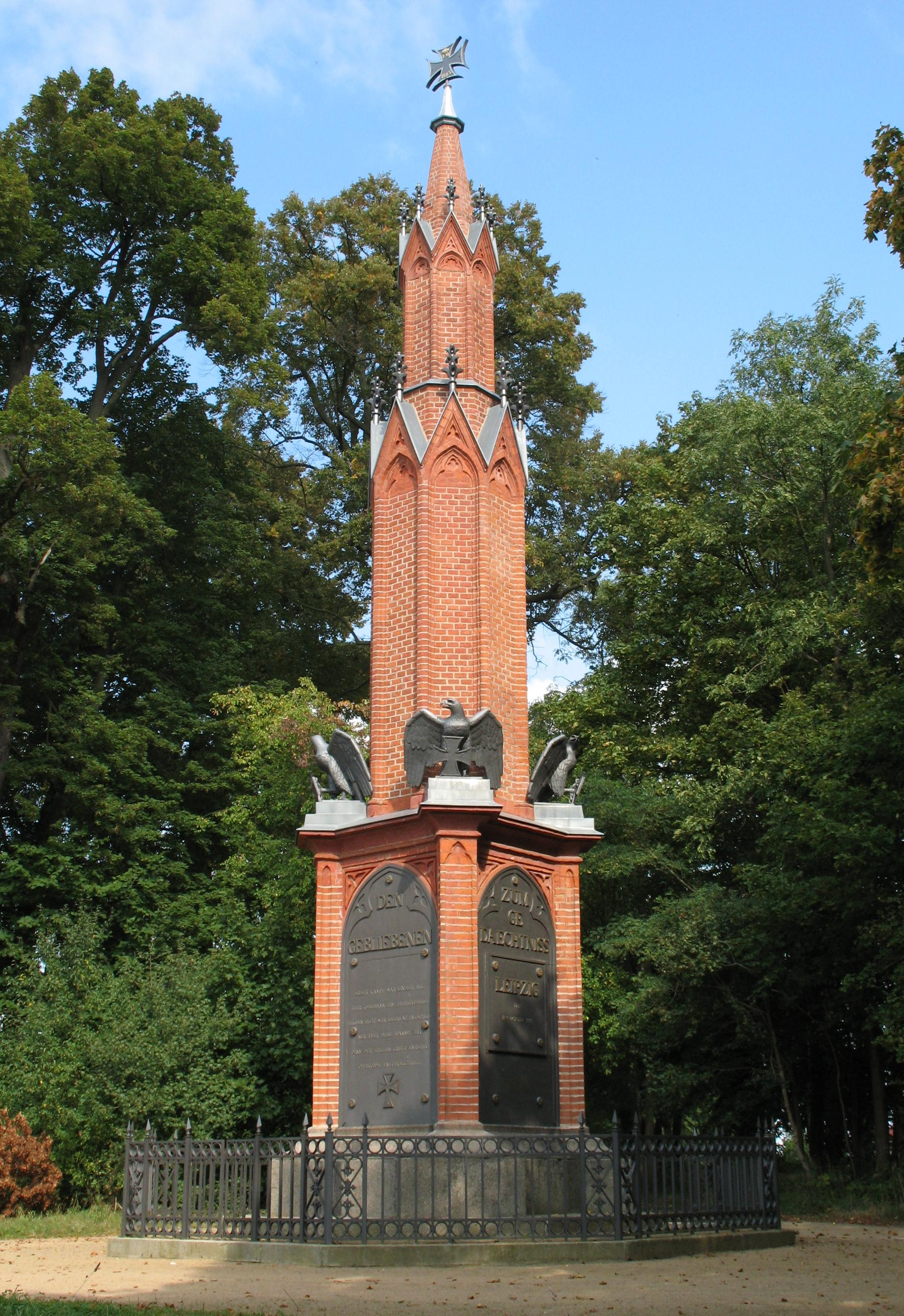
Wolfshagen (a locality of Uckerland), Monument for the Liberations Wars

== Other monuments on the Kreuzberg ==
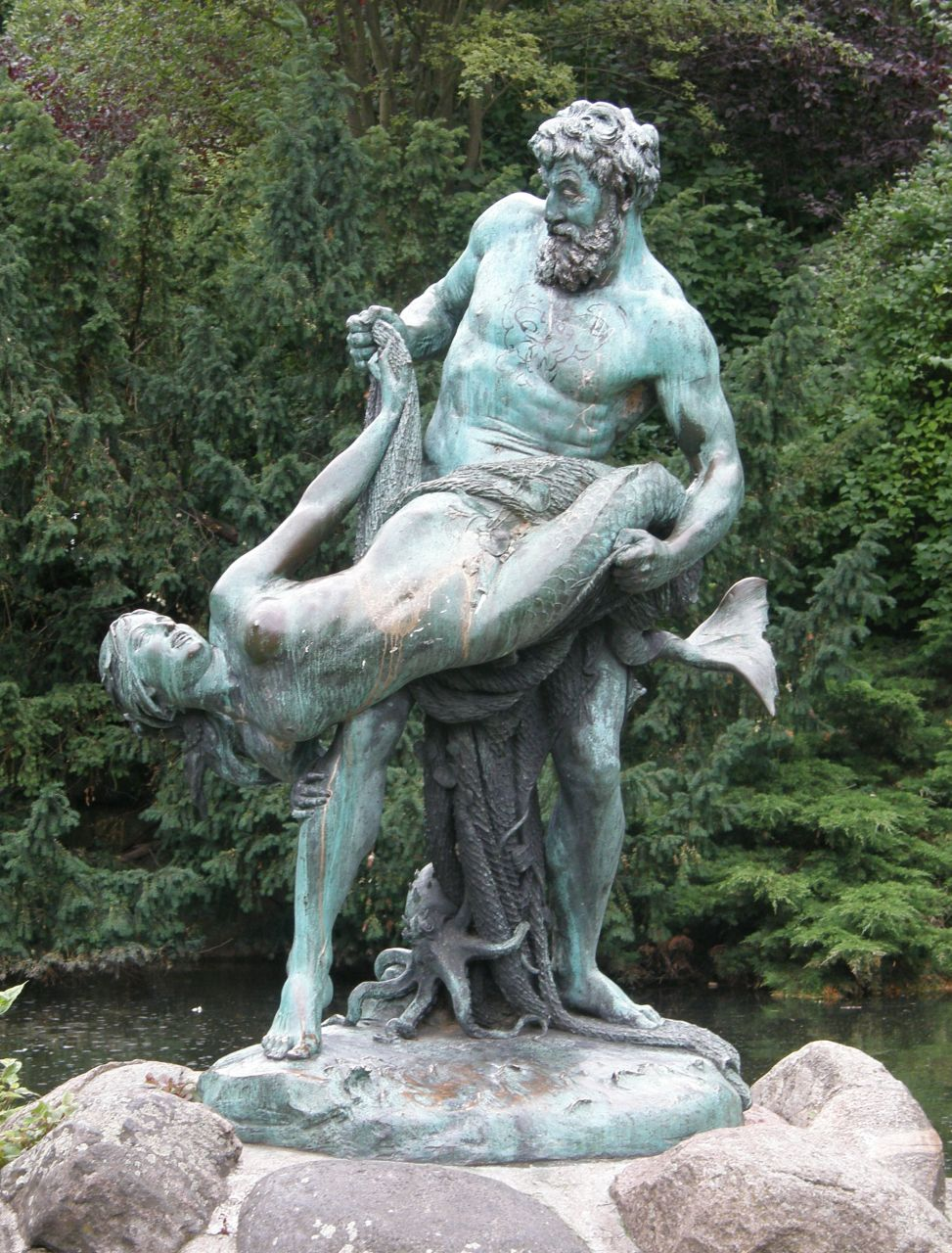
The rare haul by Herter, 1896, however, not on, but at the foot of the Kreuzberg.

Other monuments on the Kreuzberg are:

- Two herms of "poets and singers of German patriotism".
  - Monument of Heinrich von Kleist, 1898 by Karl Pracht, aluminum replica on the Kreuzberg, marble original preserved in the schoolyard of Leibniz-Gymnasium
  - Monument of Friedrich Rückert, 1899 by Ferdinand Lepcke, replica on the Kreuzberg (meanwhile stolen), original preserved in the schoolyard of Leibniz-Gymnasium
- Monument of Robert Zeller (1892–1898 lord mayor of Berlin), 1904 by Otto Lessing, with the pertaining bust lost in WW II
- Memorial for the eastern German Homeland (Mahnmal für die ostdeutsche Heimat, Ostlandkreuz; August 1952), a 8-metre-tall (26 ft) cross of pine wood with a crown of thorns of barbed wire
- Memorial stone for the 17 June 1953 (Gedenkstein 17. Juni 1953), set in August 1953 at the Homeland memorial cross, in honour of the victims of the communist suppression of the Uprising of 1953 in East Germany.

There are more monuments in the park, but rather on street level, and not on the Kreuzberg, such as the well known The rare haul (1896 by Ernst Herter), a herm to Ludwig Uhland (1899 by Max Kruse, aluminum replica) or the monument to the raped women.
