= Viktoriapark =

Park in Berlin

Coordinates: 52°29′20″N 13°22′50″E

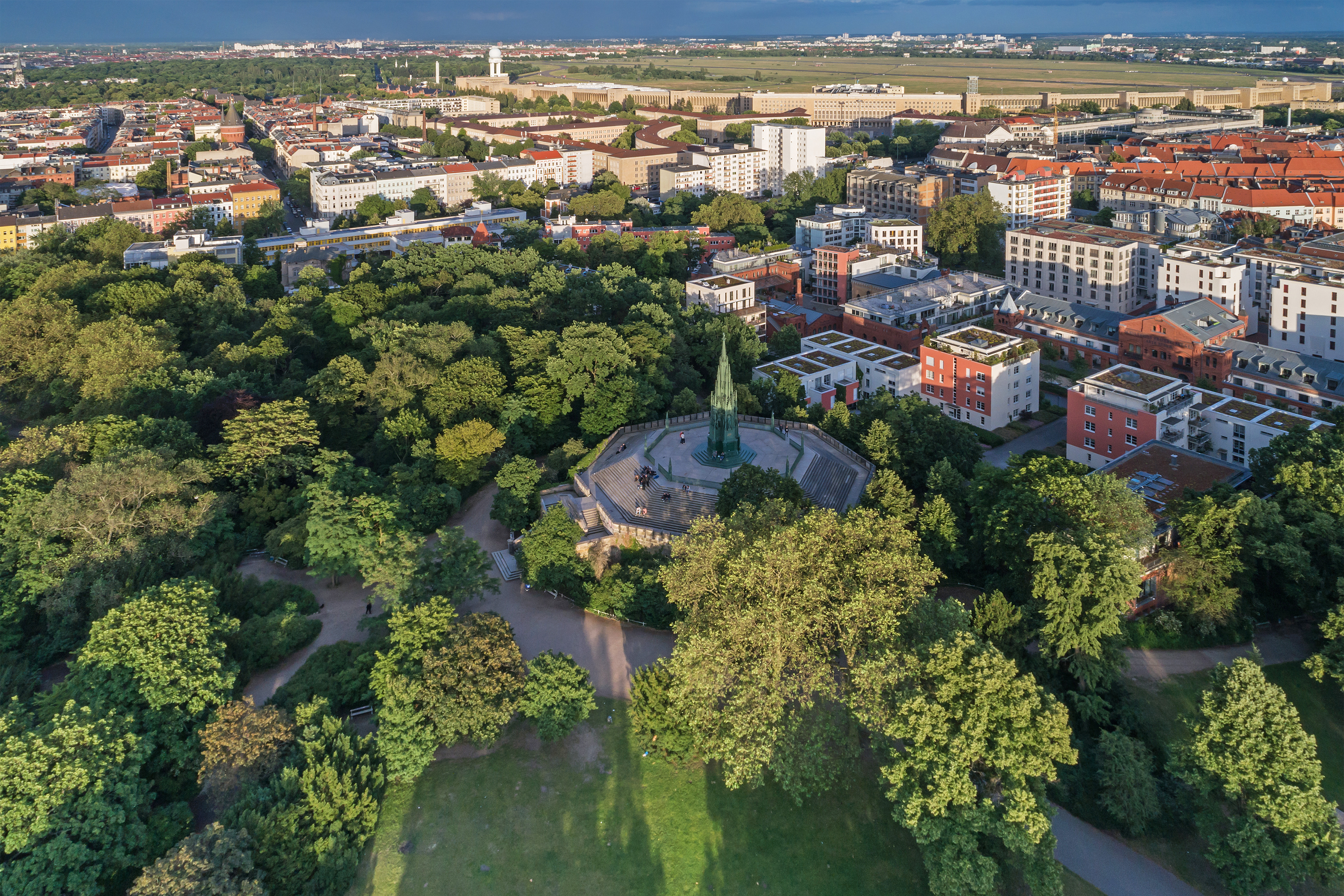
- Viktoriapark with Schinkel's National monument for the Liberation Wars.
- Interactive map of Viktoriapark

The Viktoriapark (English: Victoria Park) is an urban park in the locality of Kreuzberg in Berlin, Germany. It opened in 1894 and is named after the British princess and later Queen of Prussia Victoria.

It is situated on the Tempelhofer Berge range, forming the northern slope of the ground moraine Teltow Plateau, overlooking the glacial valley with Berlin's city centre. The major landmark of the park is a cast iron monument of 1815 dedicated by King Frederick William III of Prussia to the liberation wars (Befreiungskriege) fought at the end of the War of the Sixth coalition against France in the course of the Napoleonic Wars. It provides an excellent viewpoint over much of the central and southern portions of the city. In summer an artificial waterfall originates at the foot of the monument and continues down the hillside to the intersection of Großbeerenstraße and Kreuzbergstraße.

A historic wine-growing area, today the park is neighbouring two small vineyards, one in the northeast founded in 1968 and owned by the Senate of Berlin and cultivated by the adjacent market garden, the other one established in summer 2006 within the Victoria Quarter on the southern slope of the Kreuzberg hill. However, only the old vineyard provides for the local "Kreuz-Neroberger" wine, gained from vines donated by Kreuzberg's twin towns Wiesbaden (1968) and Ingelheim am Rhein (1975), as well by the Bergstraße county (1971 and 1973) and from Bad Bergzabern (1985). About 600 bottles are pressed each year.

== History ==
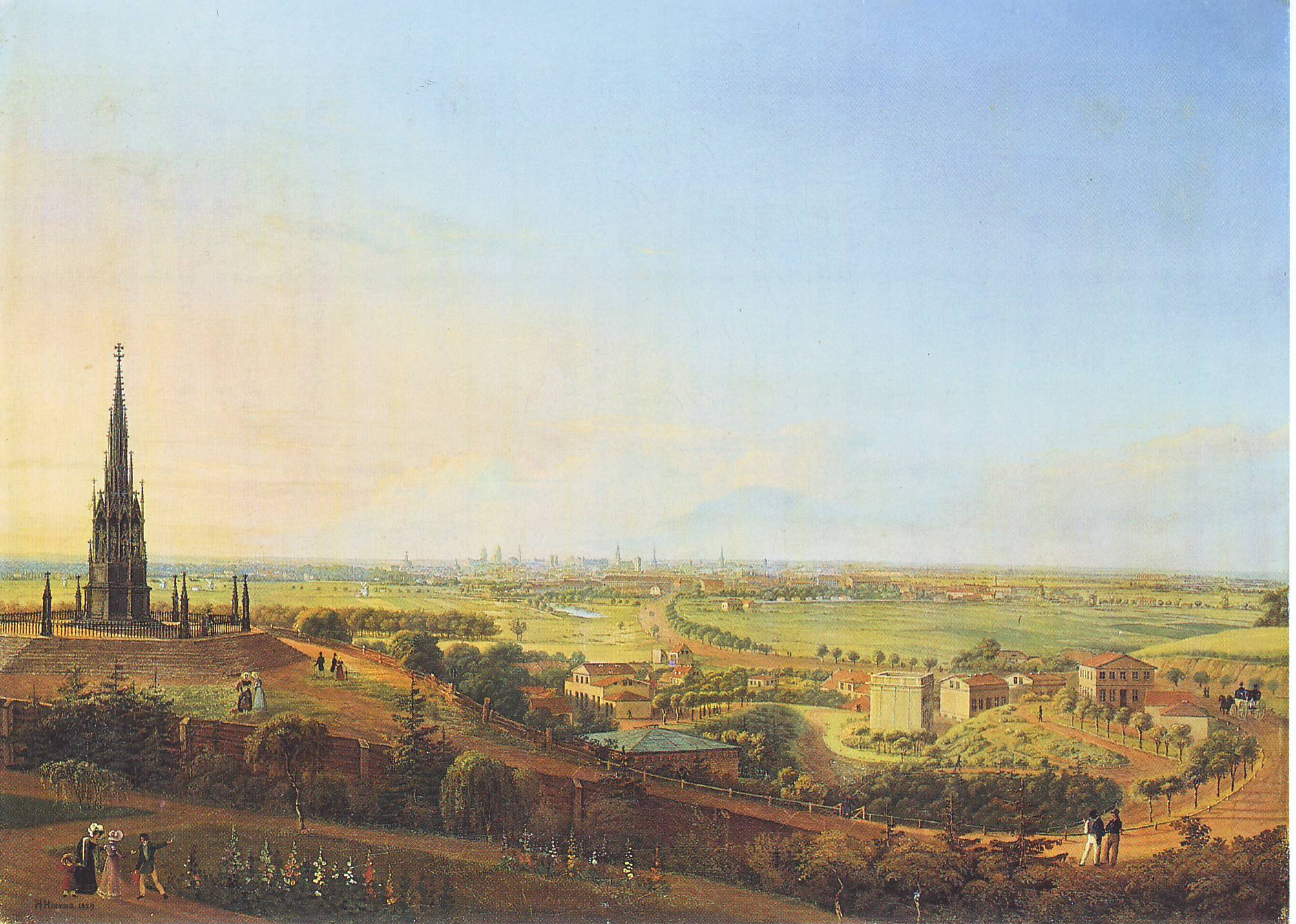
View from the Kreuzberg, 1829

In 1821 the Neoclassical Prussian National Monument for the Liberation Wars by architect Karl Friedrich Schinkel was inaugurated at the top of the 66 m (217 ft) promontory west of the road to Tempelhof, then known as Tempelhofer Berg or Runder Berg (i.e. Tempelhof or round hill). The king renamed the hill Kreuzberg after the Iron Cross (Eisernes Kreuz) at the top of the monument, in September 1921 it became the name giver of the Kreuzberg borough created by the 1920 Greater Berlin Act. The monument comprised only a small plot of land measuring about 2,839.83 m^{2} (30,567.7 sq ft). The surrounding fields were private real estate.

As the surrounding area incorporated into Berlin in 1861 as Tempelhofer Vorstadt had become a densely built-up suburb, in 1879 Guido von Madai, president of the royal police, decreed a maximum height of buildings in the adjacent streets to uphold the visibility of the monument. The year before it had been elevated through a basement structure of 8 m (26 ft). The ordinance, however, was annulled by the groundbreaking 1882 "Kreuzberg judgement" of the Prussian Royal administrative court, stating that the police had exceeded its authority to ensure public security.

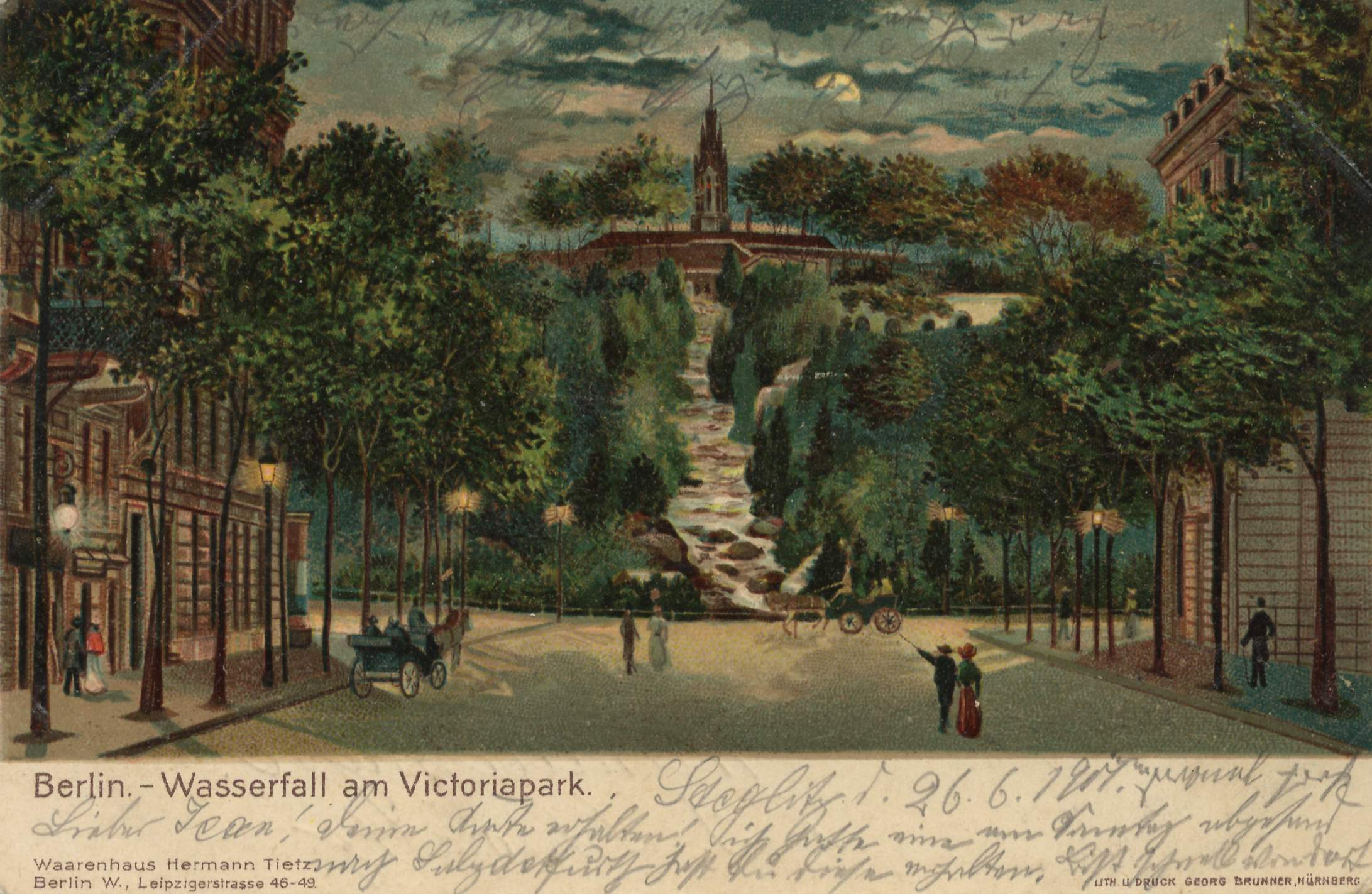
View southwards through Großbeerenstraße uphill the Kreuzberg towards the monument; up 1901, below 2007

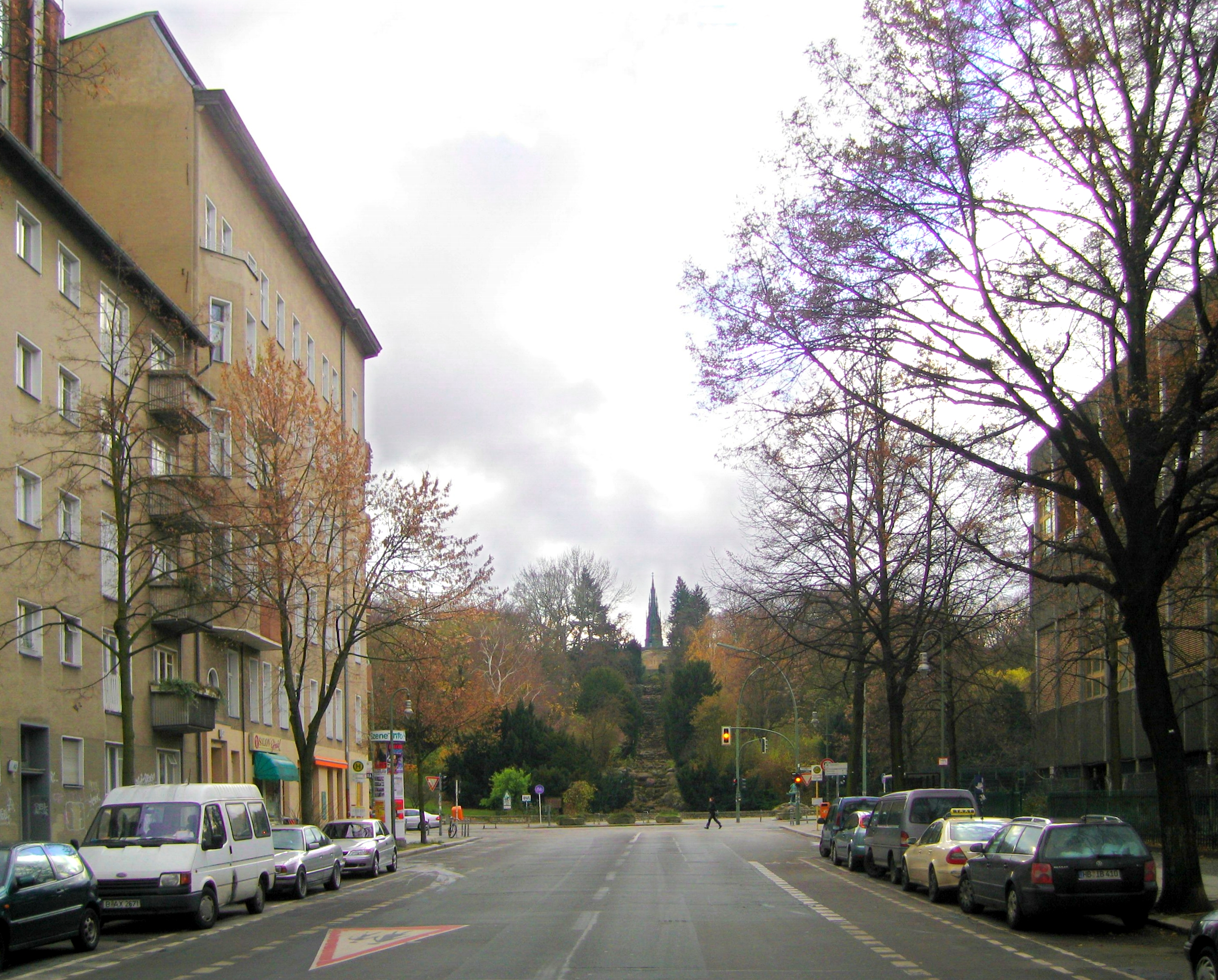

On the occasion of the elevation of the monument ideas appeared to lay out a park around it. Two years later the design of a park was put out to tender. Hermann Mächtig (*1837-1909*), since 1877 Berlin's city garden director, handed in a design, already using the name Victoria Park, in honour of Princess Victoria of Great Britain and Ireland, Prussian and German crown princess consort. However, it took the city parliament until 29 March 1886 to decide for laying out a park. On 14 December 1887 Berlin acquired 8.5 ha (21 acres) of unbuilt land from several owners, mostly north and west of the monument. Right adjacent to the south was the Tivoli brewery (est. 1857, merged into Schultheiss as of 1891, closed in 1993), and in the east and northeast villas had developed quite close to the monument. Some built-up parcels on the southern side of Kreuzbergstraße had been bought and the houses there were demolished in order to gain open access.

On 28 June 1888 the city parliament decided for Mächtig's design, who had to exchange his plans for exuberant water cascades by a more naturalistic waterfall. So Mächtig and the sculptor Albert Manthe travelled through the Giant Mountains visiting natural waterfalls to get inspired. Having returned Mächtig himself assisted by a confidant foreman started modelling and constructions for the park. The city parliament only approved Mächtig's altered waterfall designs on 25 March 1891. Using the topography of a former sand pit Mächtig designed a highland-like waterfall on the northern slope of the Kreuzberg directed in its axis towards Großbeerenstraße, named after the homonymous battle. For the waterfall Mächtig used pieces of rock from the Giant Mountains and boulders. Whereas some authors claim the Kreuzberg waterfall was modelled on the Zackel Falls in then Steinbach (renamed Kamieńczyk after 1945) in Lower Silesia, Nungesser is doubting that. Another opinion is that it was modelled on another waterfall in the Giant Mountains, the Hainfall, renamed after 1945 into Podgórna Falls. Also the Wolfsschlucht (lit. wolf's gully), designed into another exploited sand pit east of the monument, followed the homonymous example in Adersbach/Adršpach in the Giant Mountains.

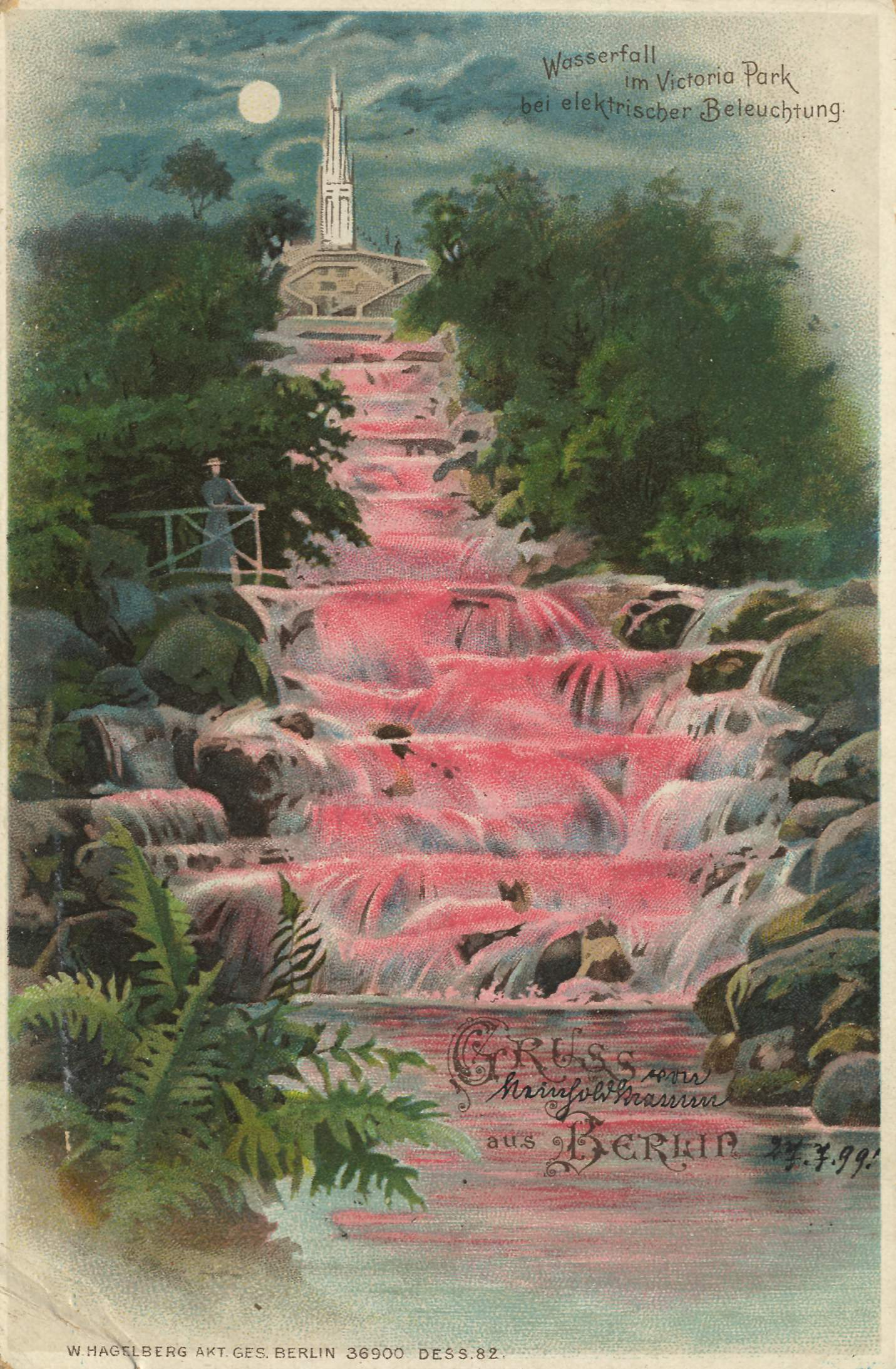
Kreuzberg waterfall with so-called electric Bengal illumination, 1898–1914.

On 14 October 1893 the waterfall ran for the first time on trial. Gas motors in a neighbouring machine house (now the venue hall of the restaurant in the Villa Kreuzberg, the former engineer's home, an ensemble built 1892–1893 by Hermann Blankenstein) pumped up the water. Since summer 1894 13,000 L (2,900 imp gal) per minute are cascading the 24 m (79 ft) down to the small lower pond. Between 1898 and the First World War the waterfall was electrically illuminated at night shining in light resembling Bengal fire. However, the operation of the waterfall was interrupted between 1914 and 1935, and again 1938 and 1961. On the occasion of the festive days firemen reflooded the idle waterfall for one day (19 August 1955) by pumping the water uphill with their fire fighting devices replacing the war-ravaged pumphouse.

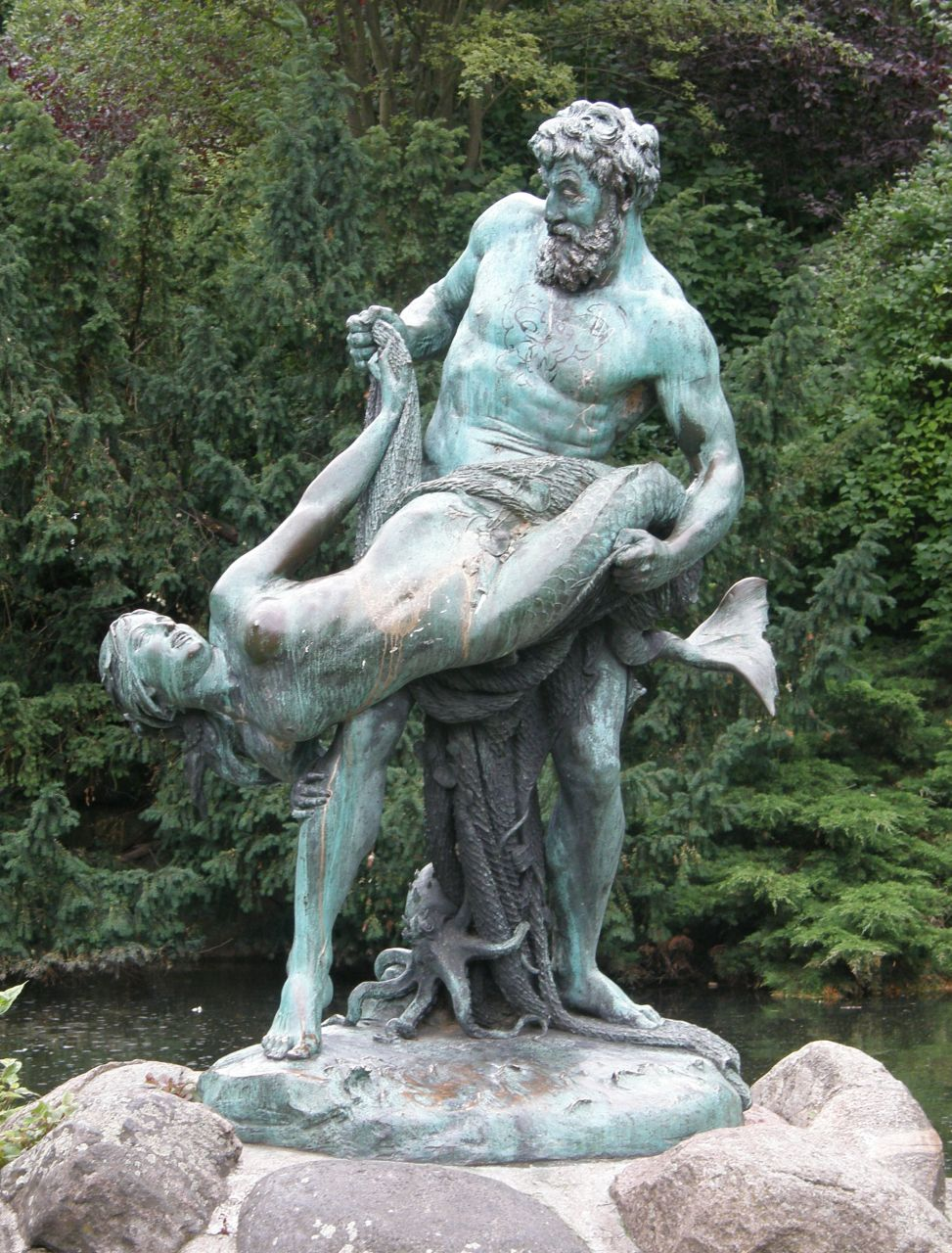
The rare haul by Herter, 1896.

Mächtig's park design, using the natural and anthrogenous topography of the Kreuzberg hill, resulted in the current mountainesque character with varied landscape forms, forested steep slopes, tiny terraces, outlooks, sodded hillsides, interrupted by trees and bushes and connected by paths, ramps, serpentine switchbacks and stairs. The park is further adorned by sculptures and monuments. At the lower pond of the waterfall, opposite to the end of Großbeerenstraße, Ernst Herter's bronze sculpture Der seltene Fang (i.e. The rare haul) was erected in 1896, displaying - with barely concealed erotic allusions - a fisherman struggling to get hold of a mermaid in his net.

In the late 1890s six herms of "poets and singers of German patriotism" have been raised, to wit Ernst Moritz Arndt (1899 by Hans Latt), Heinrich von Kleist (1898 by Karl Pracht), Theodor Körner (1899 by Ernst Wenck), Friedrich Rückert (1899 by Ferdinand Lepcke), Max von Schenkendorf (1899 by Alfred Reichel) and Ludwig Uhland (1899 by Max Kruse). However, only three of the 3-metre-tall (9.8 ft) herms (Kleist, Rückert, and Uhland) survived the Second World War. Since 1989 their marble originals are preserved in the court of Leibniz High School, while aluminum replicas were posted at their original locations, with Rückert's replica meanwhile stolen. In 1904 a further monument was added, located southeasterly of the lower waterfall bassin. Otto Lessing had created a stele with a bust of Robert Zeller, lord mayor of Berlin between 1892 and 1898. The bust got lost in the last war. On the northern slope of the Kreuzberg the park also included one of Berlin's then five playgrounds for children.

After in 1910 the Prussian military fiscus had sold its parade ground on Katzbachstraße to the city its Garden Director Albert Brodersen (*1857-1930*) extended the Victoria Park by 7.5 hectares (19 acres) to altogether 16 hectares (40 acres) between 1913 and 1916. The extension included the layout of a playing field, the present-day Willy Kressmann Stadium, homeground of the Türkiyemspor Berlin football club. In 1925 a vivarium was opened, first hosting a roe deer, soon a roe family, further goats. After the erection of more premises for animals between 1930 and 1931 birds, badgers, foxes, and reptiles were kept. Besides these native species also two monkeys were kept. All the animals - except of the birds - died in the war.

The Victoria Park was included in the Nazi plans for rebuilding Berlin, but only preparations materialised. Ernst Sagebiel oriented his Tempelhof Airport building towards the monument on the Kreuzberg so that the central hall's front on the forecourt of the airport and one edge of the monument's octagonal groundplan are parallel. As seen from the monument today's Platz der Luftbrücke in front of the airport opens as a square, encircled by buildings of similar heights except for the taller central hall of the airport (mostly realised). The then planned axis consisting of a promenade and series of waterfalls cascading down the Kreuzberg hill towards the square was never realised, the interjacent block of houses remained untouched.

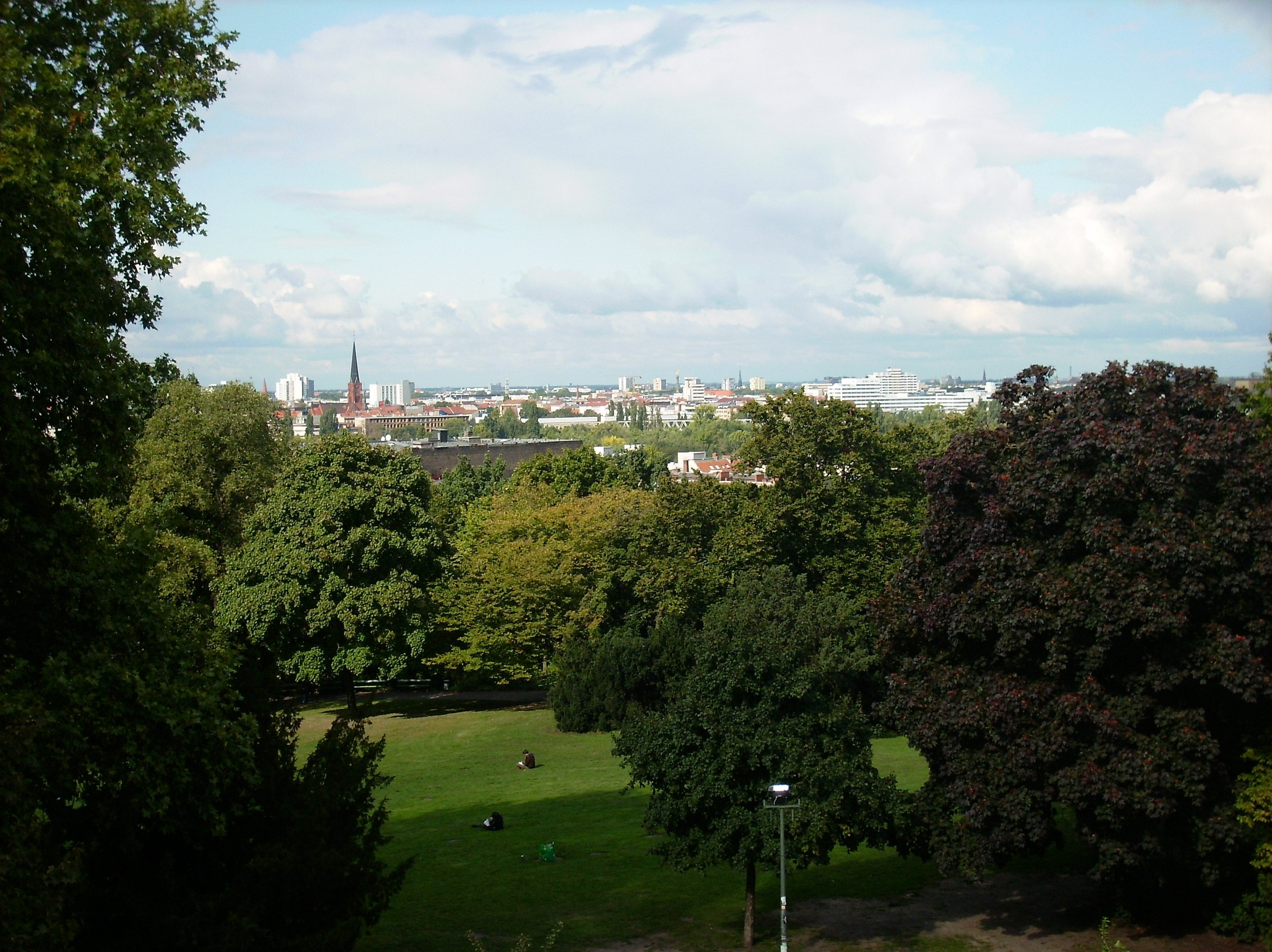
Sodded hillsides between trees.

In summer 1944 the Organisation Todt, also employing Soviet forced labourers else held captive at Blücherplatz, started driving five tunnels into the northern Kreuzberg slope from Kreuzbergstraße. The semi-completed tunnels were meant and used as air-raid shelters, while constructions continued until February 1945. On 30 January 1944 British bombs left behind a wake of devastation leading from one block north up the Großbeerenstraße, over the waterfall - destroying its pumphouse - to the monument, blasting away the southern edge of the octagonal socket structure then used as a safe place for casts of various sculptures, such as the Quadriga of the Brandenburg Gate. The casts were relocated from the open socket building in the late 1940s.
