= Herm (disambiguation) =

Herm is one of the Channel Islands in the English Channel.

Herm or L'Herm may also refer to:

== Places ==
- Herm, Landes, a French commune
- L'Herm, a French commune

== People ==
- Herm (given name), a list of people with the given name or nickname
- Gerhard Herm (born 1931), German journalist and writer
- Klaus Herm (born 1925), German actor

== Other uses ==
- Château de l'Herm, a French castle
- Herm (sculpture) a four-cornered pillar surmounted by a bust or head
- herm., a botanical/zoological abbreviation for a hermaphrodite, an organism with both sexes
- Herm., following the name of a Christian saint, it denotes that the saint was a hermit
- Herm, a fictional race of aliens in Marvel Comics, among them Klaatu

== See also ==
- Herms, a surname or given name
