= Herm (given name) =

Herm is a masculine given name which may refer to:

- Herm Johnson (born 1953), American racing driver
- Herm Rohrig (1918–2002), American National Football League player, official and scout

People named Herman who are better known as Herm include:

- Herman Edwards (born 1954), American retired National Football League player and head coach and current football analyst
- Herm Fuetsch (1918–2010), American basketball player
- Herm Gilliam (1946–2005), American basketball player
- Herm Harrison (1939–2013), retired football player, member of the Canadian Football Hall of Fame
- Herm Starrette (1936–2017), retired relief pitcher and pitching and bullpen coach
- Herm Wehmeier (1927–1973), American Major League Baseball pitcher
- Herm Winningham (born 1961), American retired Major League Baseball player

== See also ==
- John Henry Herm Doscher (1852–1934), American baseball player and umpire
