= Herms =

Herms is a surname and given name. Notable people with the name include:

- George Herms (born 1935), American artist
- René Herms (1982-2009), German middle-distance runner
- Herms Niel (1888-1954), German composer of military songs and marches

== See also ==
- Herm (disambiguation)
