= Airport rail link =

Passenger rail transport from airport to nearby city

An airport rail link is a service providing passenger rail transport between an airport and a nearby city. Direct links operate straight from the airport terminal to the city, while other links require an intermediate use of a people mover or shuttle bus. Advantages for the passenger include faster travel times and easy connections with other public transport. Advantages for the airport include increased patronage and enhanced accessibility for staff. Additionally, authorities have benefitted from less highway congestion, less pollution, and more business opportunities.

== History ==
Although airport rail links have been a popular solution in Europe and Japan for decades, only recently have links been constructed in North America, South America, Africa, Oceania, and the rest of Asia.

Some early examples of inter-city railway stations built to serve an airport include:

Station	Country	Opened	Details
Don Mueang	Thailand	1898	Serves Don Mueang International Airport which opened in 1924
Schönefeld (bei Berlin)	Germany	1951	Served Berlin Schönefeld Airport, later served Berlin Brandenburg Airport Terminal 5
Gatwick Airport	United Kingdom	1958	Rebuilt to directly serve Gatwick Airport
Brussels Airport-Zaventem	Belgium	1958	Serves Brussels Airport
Frankfurt am Main Flughafen Fernbahnhof	Germany	1972	Serves Frankfurt Airport

The first rapid transit station to connect with an airport was Berlin's U-Bahn U6 Paradestraße station which opened in 1927 as Flughafen (lit. 'airport') and was built to provide direct access to Berlin Tempelhof Airport. However, the connection was removed in 1937 and the preceding Platz der Luftbrücke station was instead granted the connection and remained so until Berlin Tempelhof Airport's closure in 2008.

Other early examples of rapid transit stations connecting with airports include Boston's MBTA Blue Line Airport station which opened in 1952 (rebuilt in 2004), and Cleveland's RTA Rapid Transit Red Line Cleveland Hopkins International Airport station which opened in 1968 (rebuilt in 1994). Boston's link requires a short shuttle bus transfer from the station to the airport terminal, whilst Cleveland's link is considered the first direct service in the Western Hemisphere.

Tokyo Monorail, which opened in 1964 as Japan's first airport rail link, had its original southern terminus underneath the old domestic terminal of Haneda Airport. When Haneda Airport was expanded onto landfill reclaimed from Tokyo Bay in the 1980s–2010s, the monorail was extended to the new terminals as well, with the original southern terminus later renamed as Tenkūbashi Station.

== Connection types ==
=== High-speed rail and inter-city rail ===
A high-speed or inter-city service provides direct travel between an airport and its surrounding cities. This solution usually requires the building of new track, whether it is a newly built main line or a branch (spur) line. These services often have premium fares, lower frequencies (e.g. every 30 minutes) and luxury features (e.g. luggage racks, power outlets, Wi-Fi, bathrooms).

Integration with high-speed and inter-city services has produced alliances where airlines sell tickets that include the connecting rail service. Parts of Europe have seen integration of high-speed rail stations into airports, with domestic and international TGV services from Paris Charles de Gaulle Airport and ICE services from Frankfurt Airport. Because of this, some stations have received IATA codes.

=== Regional rail and commuter rail ===
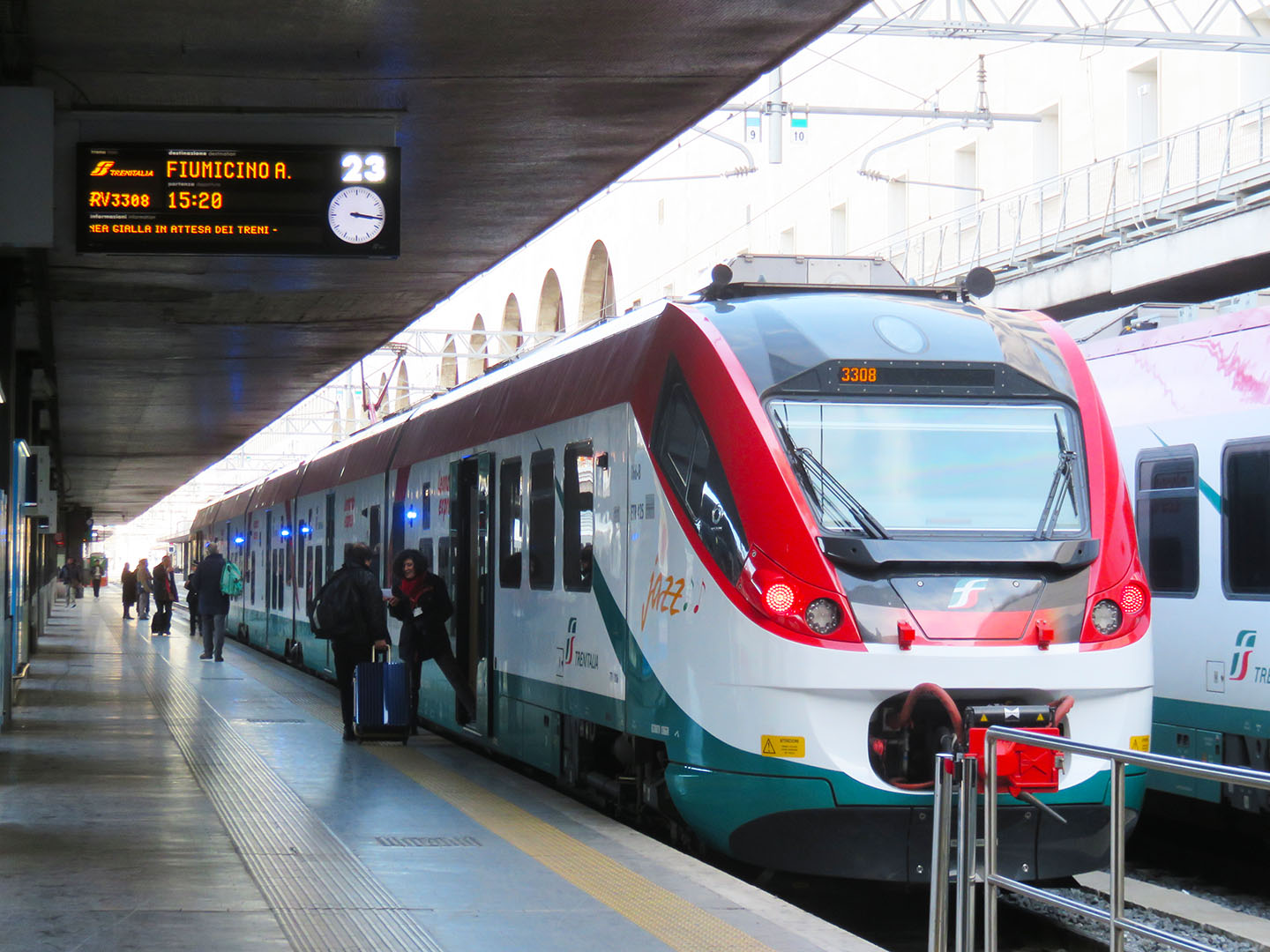
Leonardo Express, Rome

A regional or commuter "airport express" service provides direct travel between an airport and its city centre. This solution is often used where the airport is outside the urban area and some way from the mass transit system but a direct downtown service is required. There are various ways this can be achieved: it may operate on a combination of existing or newly built mainline rail track using a dedicated fleet of rolling stock designed for airport service. Similarly to high-speed and inter-city services, these services often have premium fares, lower frequencies and luxury features.

=== Rapid transit and light rail ===
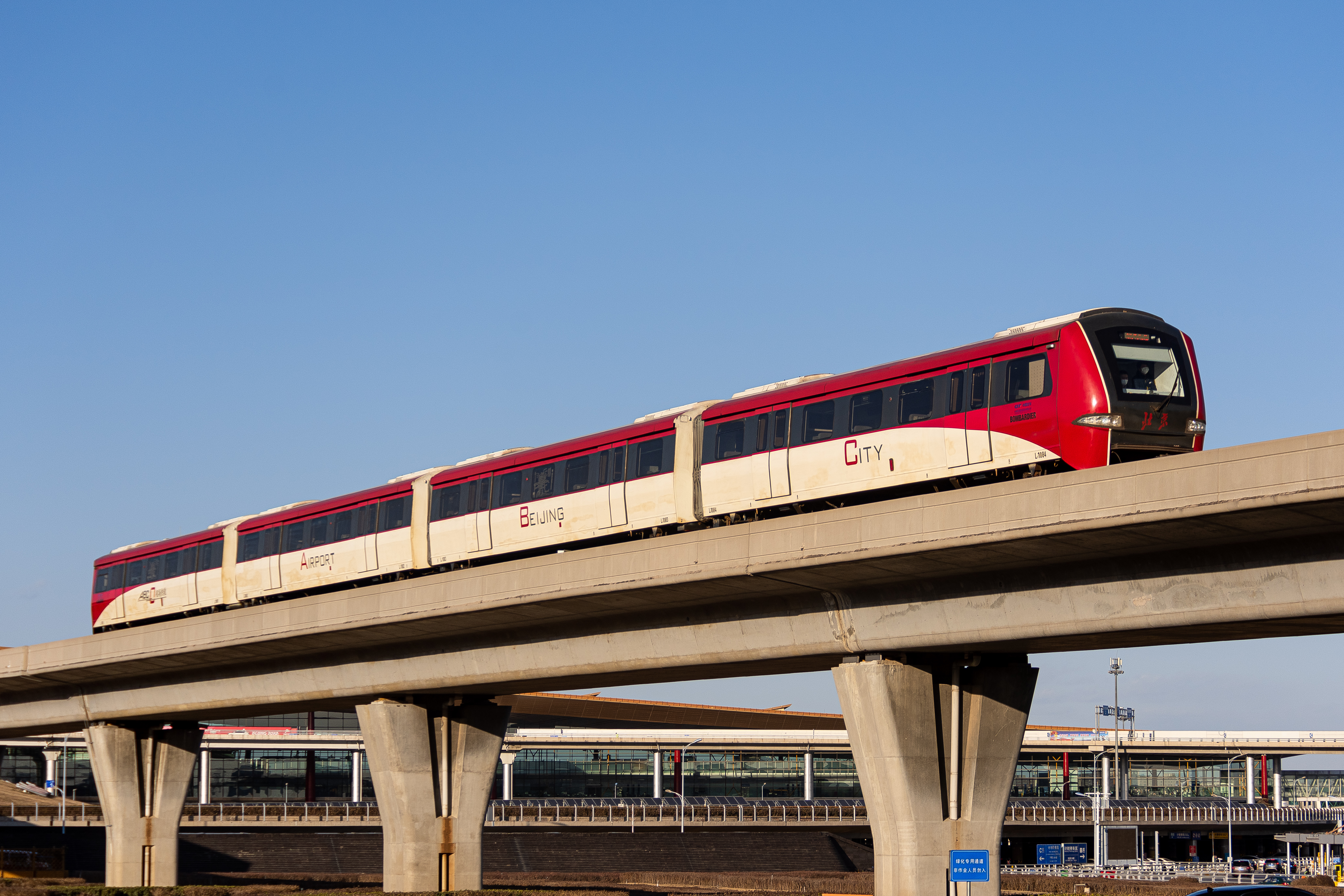
Capital Airport Express, Beijing

For airports built within or close to the city limits, extending rapid transit or light rail to the airport allows seamless transport to suburbs and full integration with other lines. These services usually have a higher frequency (e.g. every 5 minutes) but longer travel times due to the service making many intermediate stops between the airport and the city centre. Additionally, there may not be enough space for baggage commonly carried by airport-bound passengers. Luggage stowing facilities are not commonly found on rapid transit or light rail vehicles as their primary objective is to provide high-capacity service.

=== Rail via people mover ===
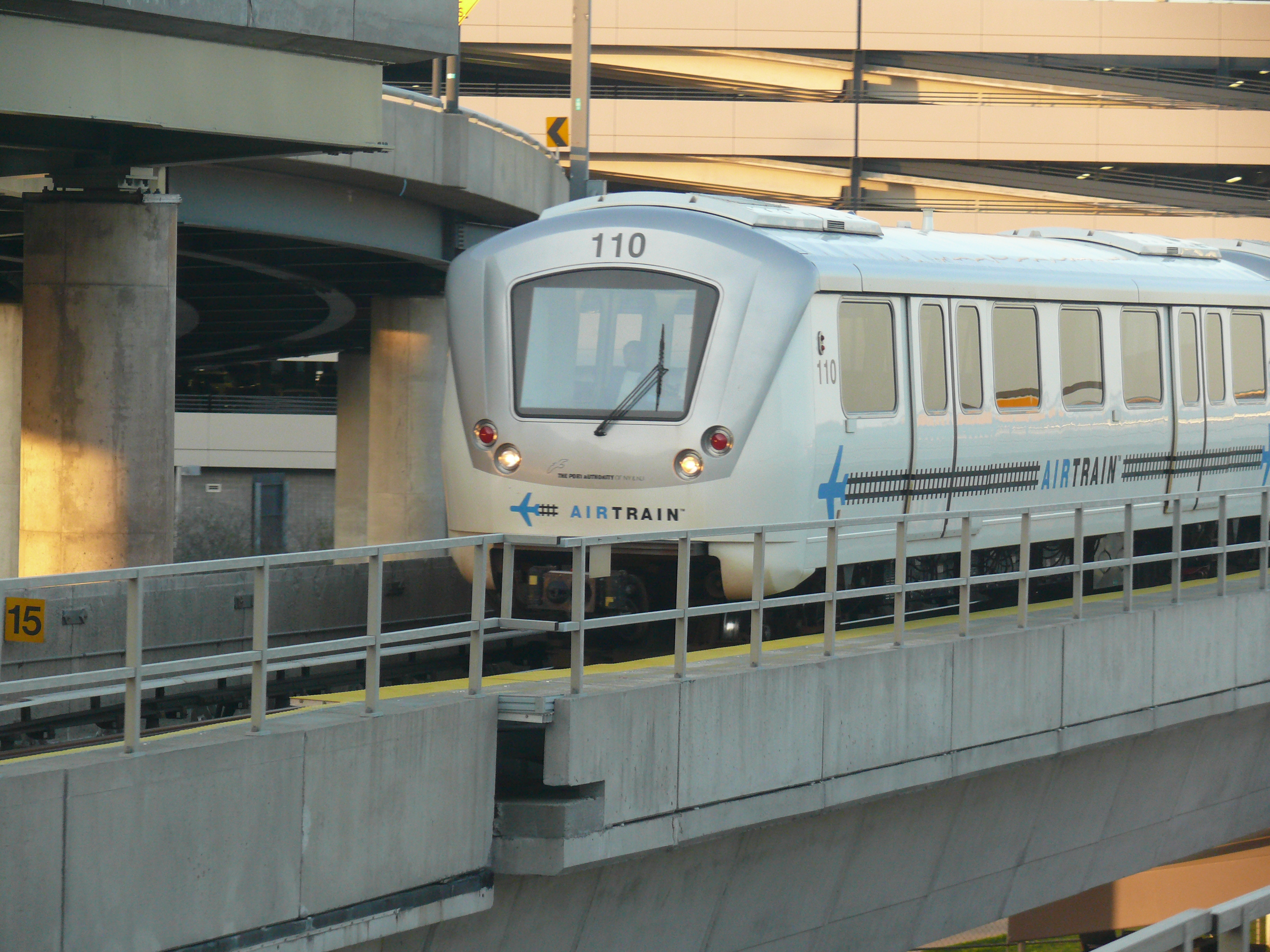
AirTrain JFK, New York City

A hybrid solution adopted in some cities is a direct link to an airport railway station connected to a people mover. The passenger transfers from the railway station to the people mover which then completes the journey to the airport terminal. While this option is commonly chosen to reduce construction costs, it is only feasible when a rail line is near the airport. Some airports, such as San Francisco International Airport, are directly served by an airport rail link to some terminals but not others. In such cases, passengers using terminals that lack a direct connection must use a people mover to access their terminal. People movers typically also serve parking lots, airport hotels and off-site car rental facilities. People movers are seen to have a higher perceived quality compared to a shuttle bus.

=== Rail via shuttle bus ===
Another hybrid solution is a direct link to an airport railway station connected to a shuttle bus. The passenger transfers from the railway station to the shuttle bus which then completes the journey to the airport terminal. A shuttle bus requires no specialised infrastructure, and is often the preferred choice at smaller or low-cost airports. Shuttle buses may involve a wait for a transfer to the next stage of the journey and often suffer from lower perceived quality and market share compared to direct connections.

== Current examples ==
=== High-speed rail and inter-city rail ===
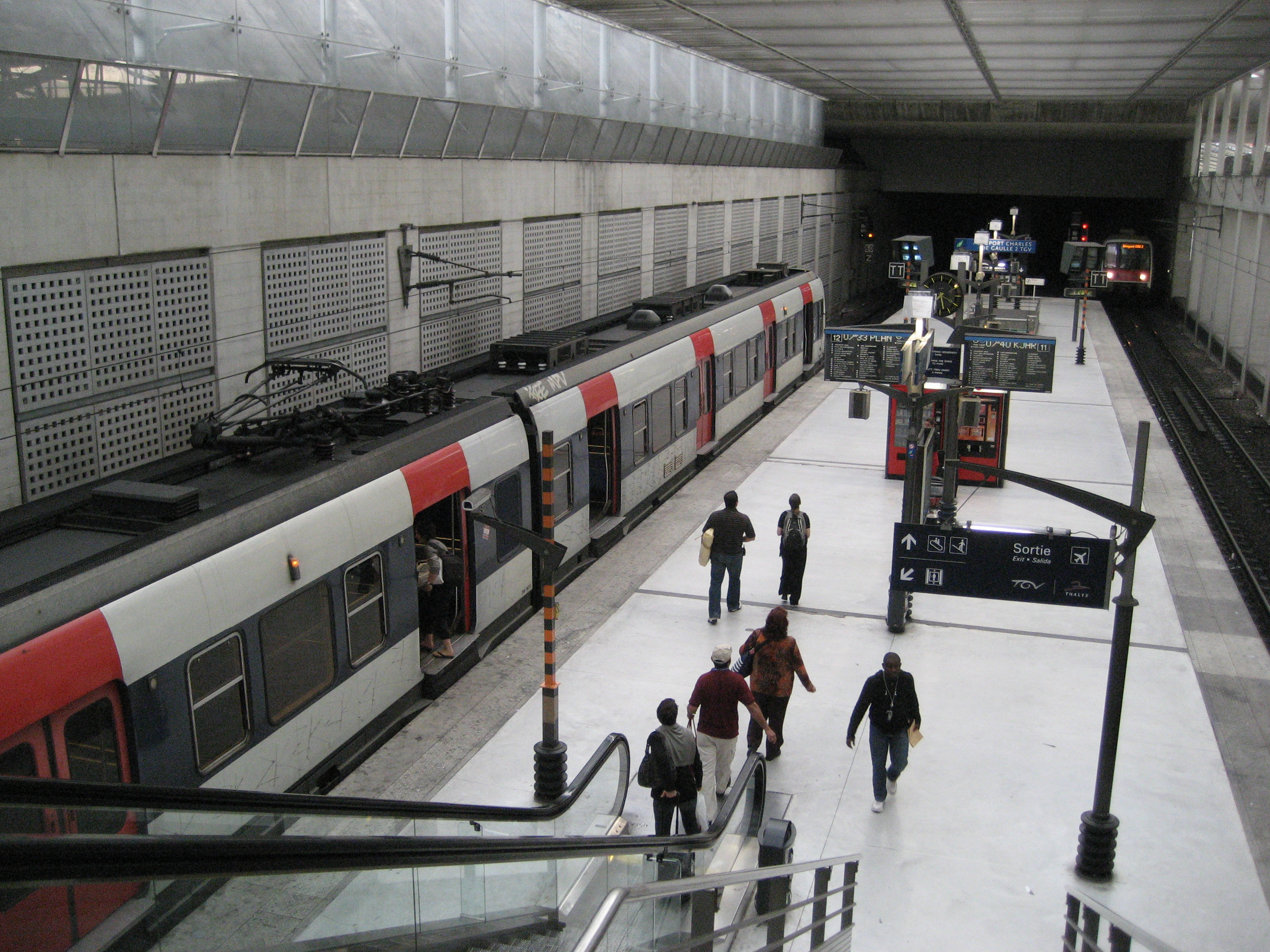
RER B, Paris

Examples include Schiphol Airport station to other Dutch cities, Zürich Flughafen station to other Swiss cities, and Daxing Airport station to other Chinese cities.

=== Regional rail and commuter rail ===
Examples include the Airport Rail Link between Suvarnabhumi Airport and Bangkok, the Narita Express between Narita International Airport and Tokyo, the Union Pearson Express between Toronto Pearson International Airport and Toronto, and the Leonardo Express between Leonardo da Vinci–Rome Fiumicino Airport and Rome.

=== Rapid transit and light rail ===
Examples include the East–West Line between Changi Airport station and Singapore, the Silver Line between Washington Dulles International Airport station and Washington, D.C., the Blue Line between O'Hare station and Chicago, the Canada Line between YVR-Airport station and Vancouver, and the Orange Line between DFW Airport Terminal A station and Dallas.

=== Rail via people mover ===
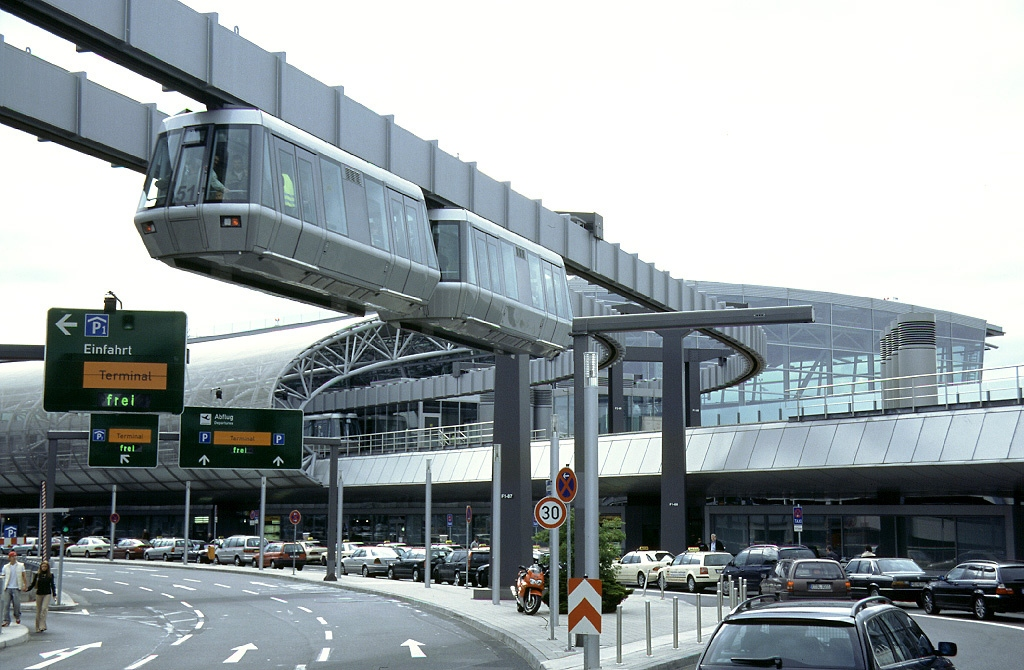
SkyTrain, Düsseldorf

Examples include Soekarno–Hatta International Airport via Soekarno–Hatta Airport Skytrain to/from SHIA station, London Luton Airport via Luton DART to/from Luton Airport Parkway station, and Paris Orly Airport via Orlyval to/from Antony station.

=== Rail via shuttle bus ===
Examples include Shijiazhuang Zhengding International Airport via shuttle bus to/from Zhengding Airport station, Salvador Bahia Airport via shuttle bus to/from Aeroporto station, and Milwaukee Mitchell International Airport via shuttle bus to/from Milwaukee Airport station.

== See also ==
- Air-rail alliance
- Intermodal passenger transport
- List of IATA-indexed railway stations
- List of airport rail link systems
