= Tempelhofer Feld =

German historical military practice and parade ground

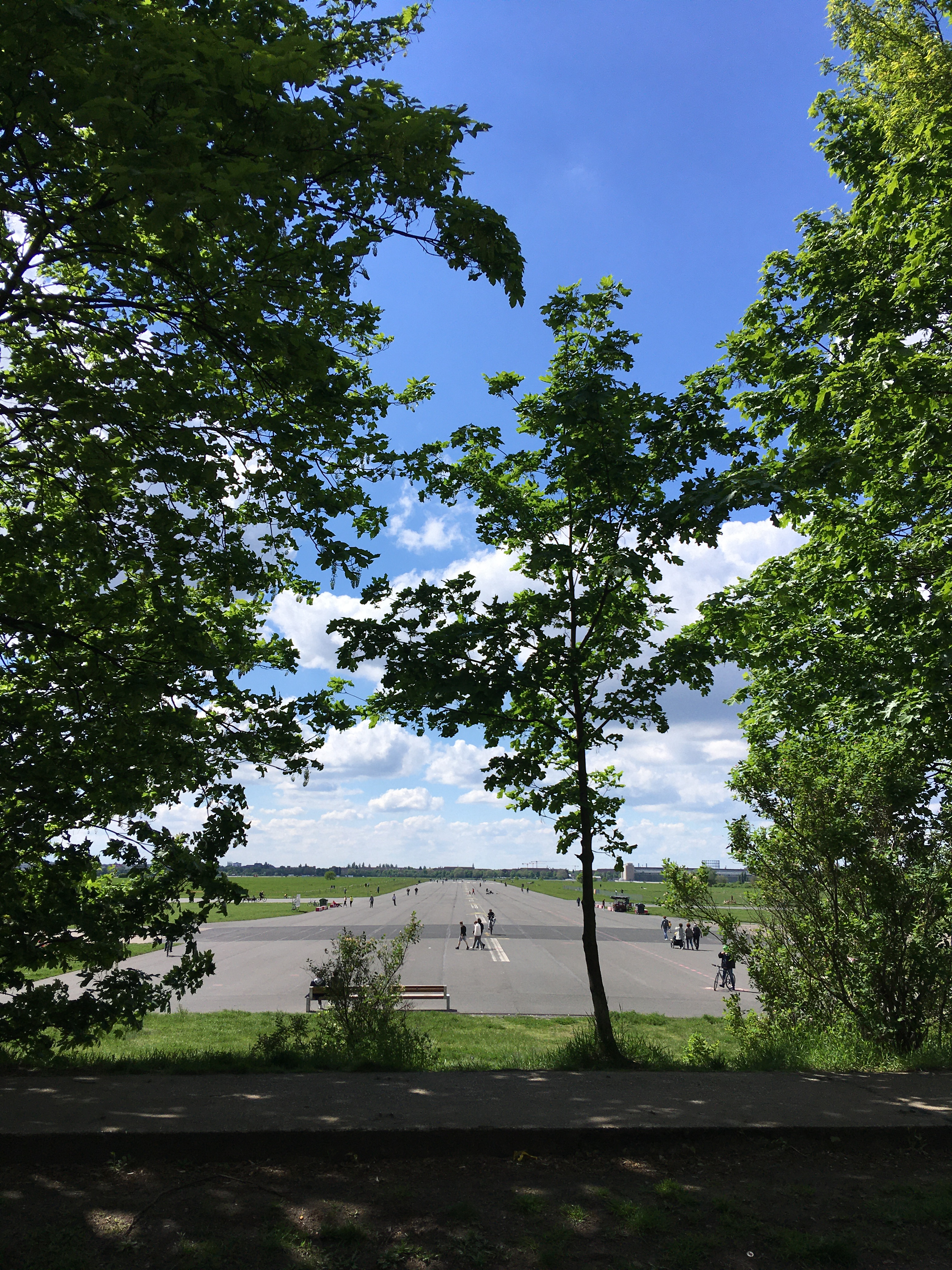
- Tempelhofer Feld in May 2021
- Tempelhofer Feld in Berlin
- Type: Urban park
- Location: Berlin, Germany
- Coordinates: 52.476°N 13.395°E
- Area: 355 hectares (3.55 km^{2})
- Website: gruen-berlin.de

Tempelhofer Feld (English: Tempelhof Field) historically was an area in Berlin used for military practice, and as a parade ground of the Berlin garrison. It belonged to the Tempelhofer uplands on the Teltow plateau, in the south of Berlin. Tempelhofer Feld is closely linked to German military and aviation history, as well as German football history. Today it is a developed area, with the exception of the Tempelhofer Feld park on the site of the former Tempelhof Airport.

== History ==
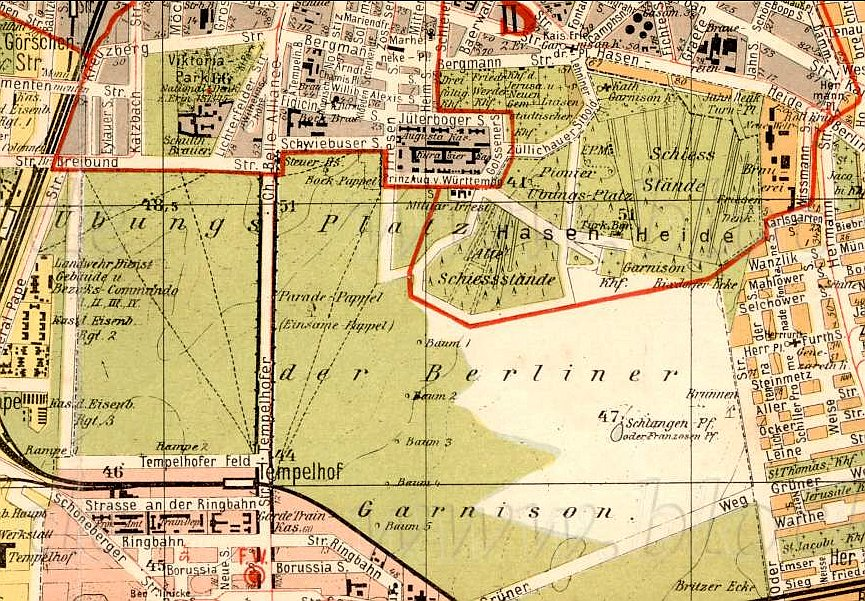
Excerpt from the supplement to the address book for Berlin and its suburbs, 1907; also highlighted is the Paradepappel

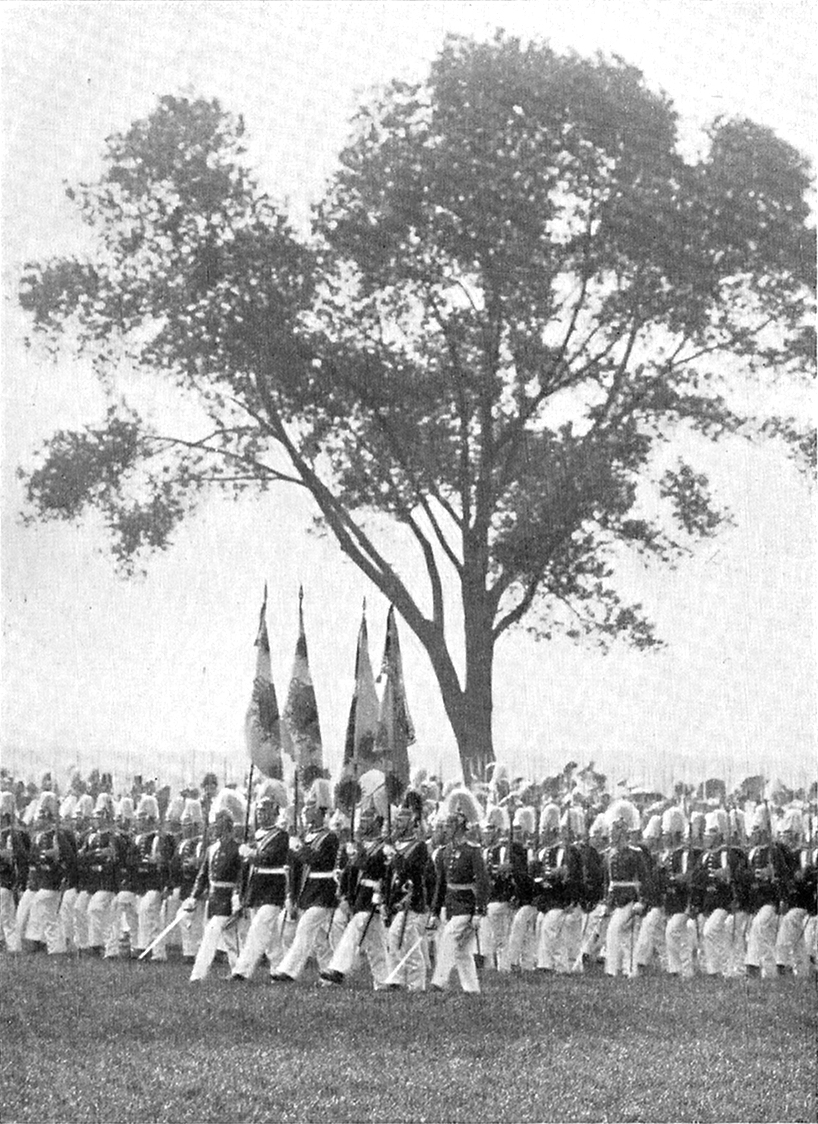
The historic poplar on the Tempelhofer Felde. It stood since the time of the Soldier King and King Frederick the Great. Here, the 3rd Regiment of Foot Guards pass by.

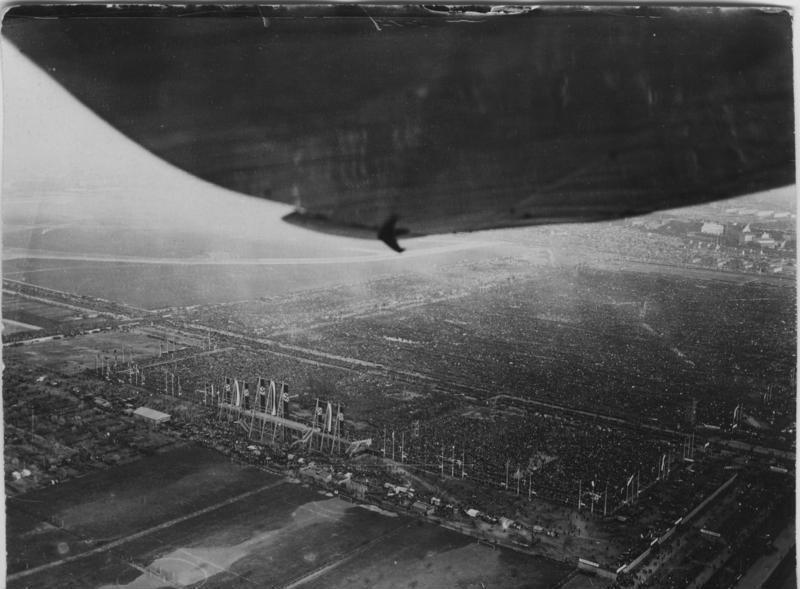
Aerial view of Tempelhofer Feld, May 1, 1933

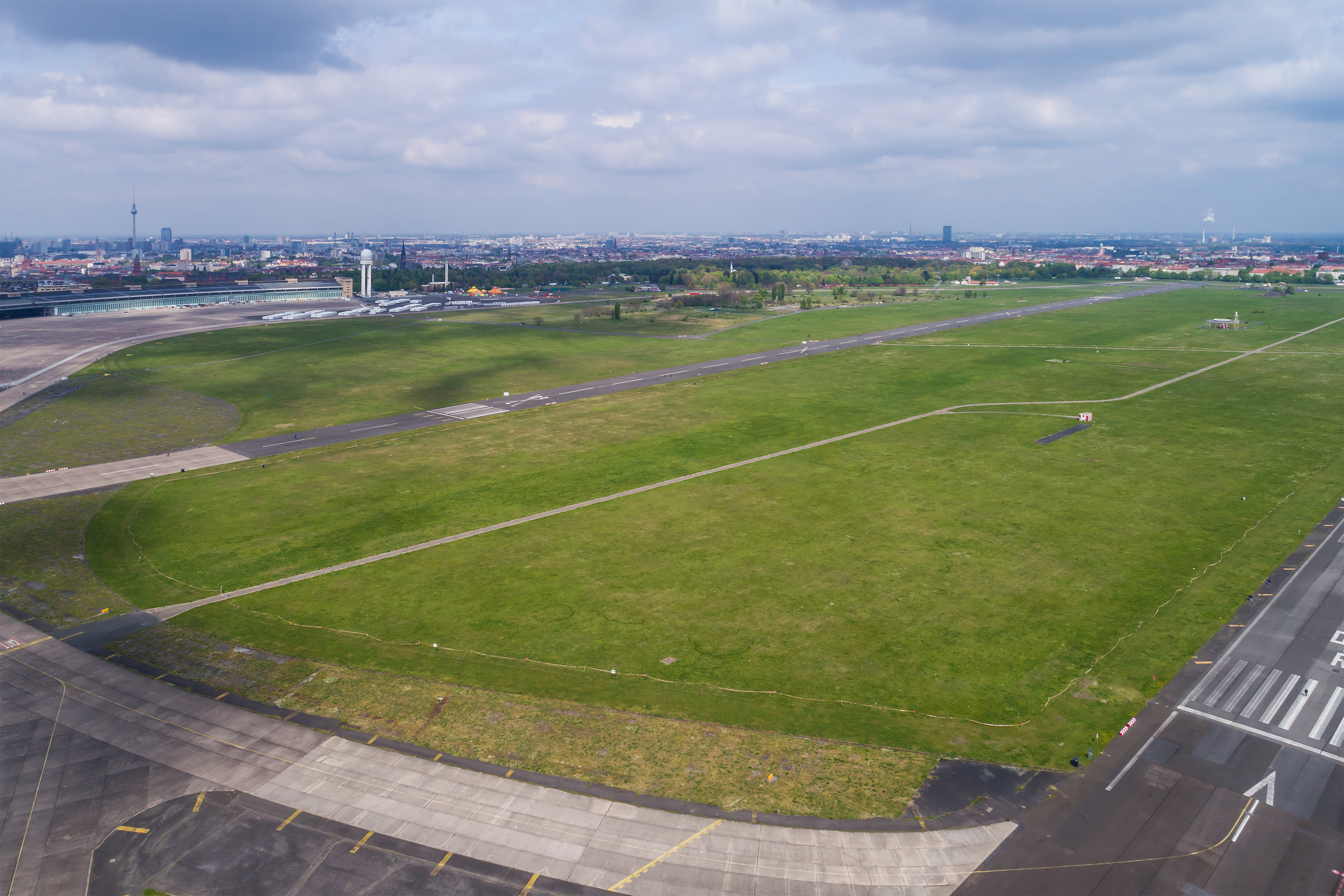
Aerial view of Tempelhof Field, 2017

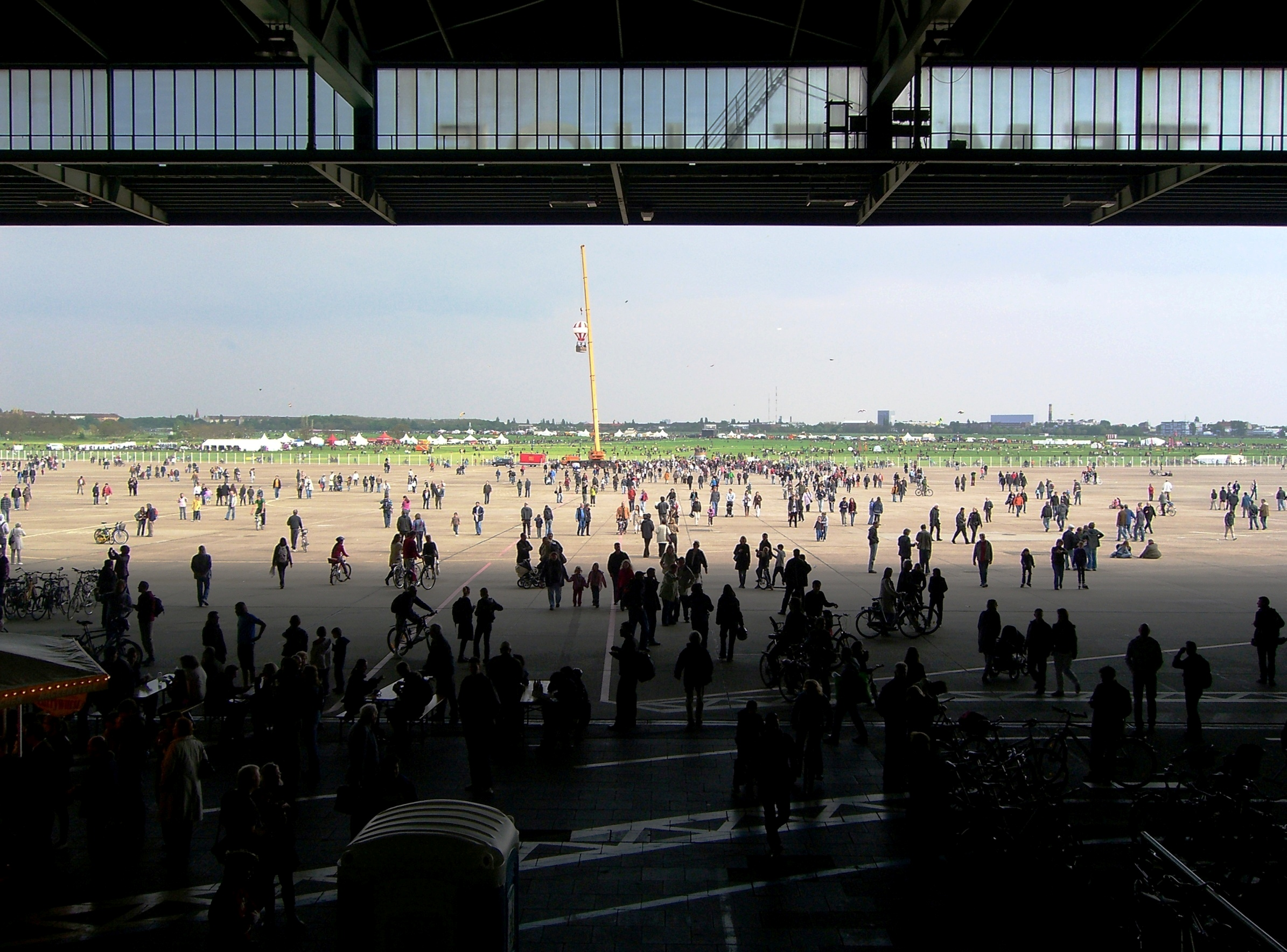
Opening of the Tempelhofer Park in May 2010

Aerial view of Tempelhofer Feld to the east

=== Use as a parade ground ===
The field located between the towns of Schöneberg and Tempelhof, then also known as Großes Feld (Great Field), was used by Schöneberg farmers as farmland until the 18th century. Under Frederick William I, it was also used as a military parade and drill ground from 1722 onwards, as well as a maneuvering area for the Prussian army. On August 2, 1881, the Hawaiian king Kalākaua was a guest at a parade on the field.

On 3 November 1897, the world's first rigid airship, an all-metal craft designed by Hungarian inventor David Schwarz, equipped with a 12-hp/9-kW Daimler engine, and shaped like a short, fat pencil, set off on its maiden flight from Tempelhofer Feld. It was destroyed on landing; pilot Ernst Jagels escaped with minor injuries.

The field's function as a parade ground was maintained until spring 1914.

=== Berlin-Tempelhof Airport ===
In 1922, work began to turn the area into Tempelhof Airport. The initial construction was completed by 1928, with further expansion planned by Ernst Sagabiel in 1934. The new airport building was then built from 1936 to 1941.

Starting in 1940, the airport building was used exclusively by the arms industry. For example, for the assembly and maintenance of the dive combat aircraft Ju 87. To conduct this work, thousands of forced laborers were brought from all over Europe, with their camps and accommodations located on the field itself.

After the end of World War II, flight operations resumed. The airport gained particular importance during the Berlin blockade from 1948 to 1949, with supply aircraft sometimes landing as often as every 90 seconds.

In 1970, after the construction of Tegel Airport, the airport was temporarily closed to civilian air traffic, reopening in 1985. All flight operations were later discontinued completely in 2008, due to the construction of the Berlin Brandenburg International Airport (BER), although this airport did not open until 2020.

=== Dispute about the continued use of the area ===
Two German political parties, the CDU and FDP, initiated a referendum against the shutdown of flight operations. The referendum ultimately failed after not getting enough support from local citizens.

Later, several thousand activists came together in an alliance called Squat Tempelhof in order to occupy the site and protest against the plans for re-use. This planned mass occupation of the closed field was to make the point that the area (unused and fenced off at the time), should be accessible to citizens. The Berlin Senate had promised that after the closure of the airport, the space would be opened to the general population but by June 2009 this had not yet happened. Many residents, as well as tenant alliances and the Green party came together to organize. However, the occupation was prevented by the police. Around 1,500 officers were on duty and 102 demonstrators were arrested.

== Tempelhofer Feld park ==
=== 2010 Opening ===
The field re-opened on May 8, 2010 as Tempelhofer Park, a recreational area in Berlin districts Neukölln and Tempelhof. During the first open weekend, the park was visited by around 235,000 visitors.

=== Park description ===
Now officially called Tempelhofer Feld, it covers 355 hectares of the site of the former Tempelhof Airport, including its buildings and surrounding land, making it the largest inner city open space in the world, and Berlin's largest city park.

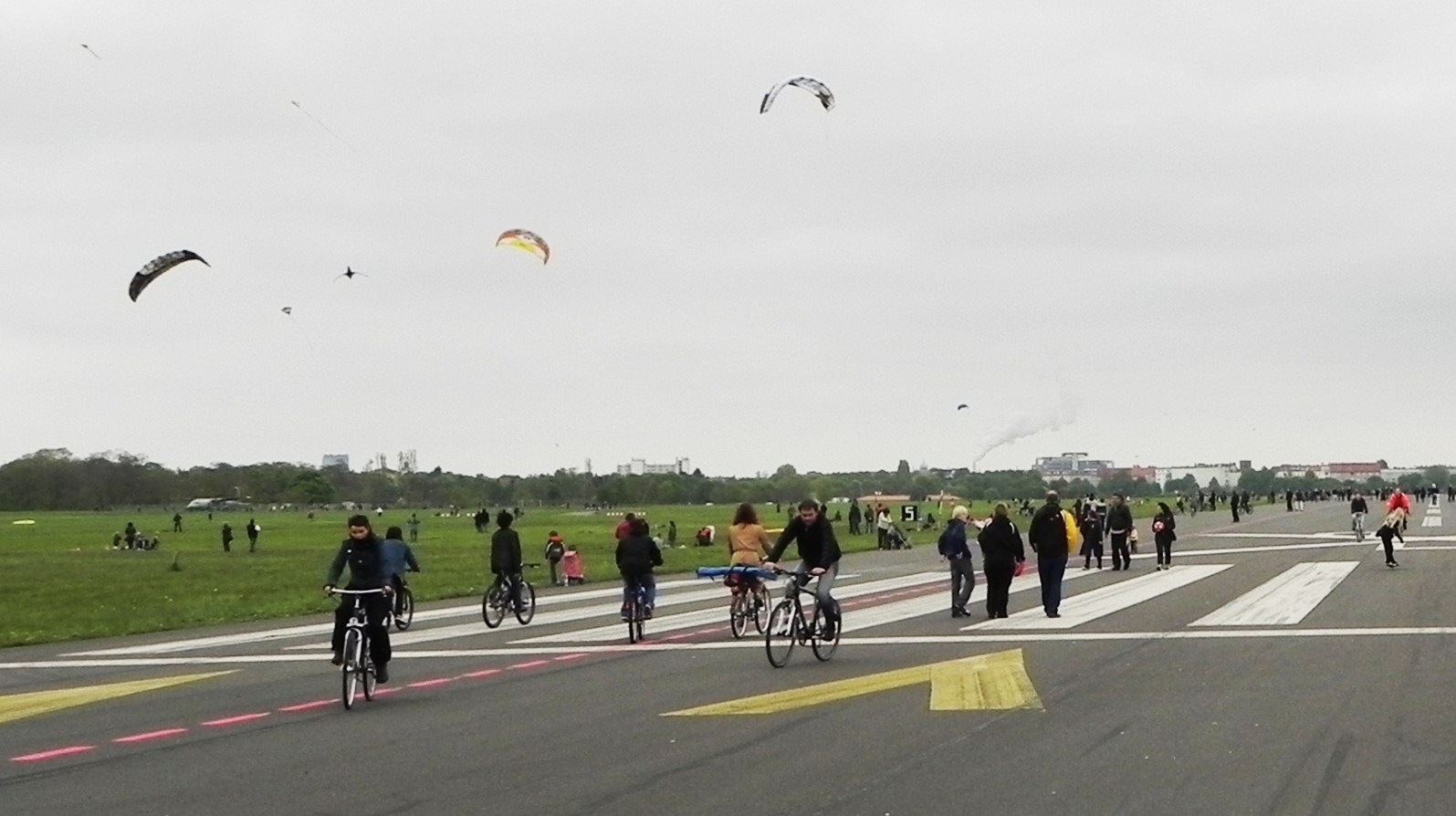
Tempelhofer Feld park

The park is accessible from sunrise to sunset and can be accessed via ten entrances. Six of them are located at the eastern end of the former runways along Oderstraße, two at Tempelhof station and the Paradestraße U-Bahn at Tempelhofer Damm, and two at Columbiadamm, on the level of the 1866 Islamic cemetery with the Şehitlik Mosque, and Golßener Straße.

=== Unsuccessful development attempts ===
Throughout the time that Tempelhofer Feld has functioned as a public park, there have been many attempts to develop and privatize it. Each time there has been significant citizen pushback.

The Berlin Senate is officially responsible for the park planning, though private initiatives have also tried to realize their plans for the field. This has led to additional planning conflicts as there is no independent mediation institution between these two interest groups. Many plans were made, including hosting the International Garden Exhibition (IGA), a state library, and housing. These plans were stopped completely by a successful citizen's referendum in 2014.

The activism necessary to save the park was ongoing for several years, starting with the founding of the citizen's action group called 100% Tempelhofer Feld in September 2011. Their aim was to stop Senate plans and prevent all future building on the site. They organized the referendum to completely preserve the public space, so that it could not be used for state, residential or commercial purposes. They announced a petition in autumn 2012 and began the collection of signatures that December. On May 25, 2014 the referendum passed with 64.3 percent of votes in favor.
