= Platz der Luftbrücke =

Public square in Berlin, Germany

Coordinates: 52°29′03″N 13°23′15″E

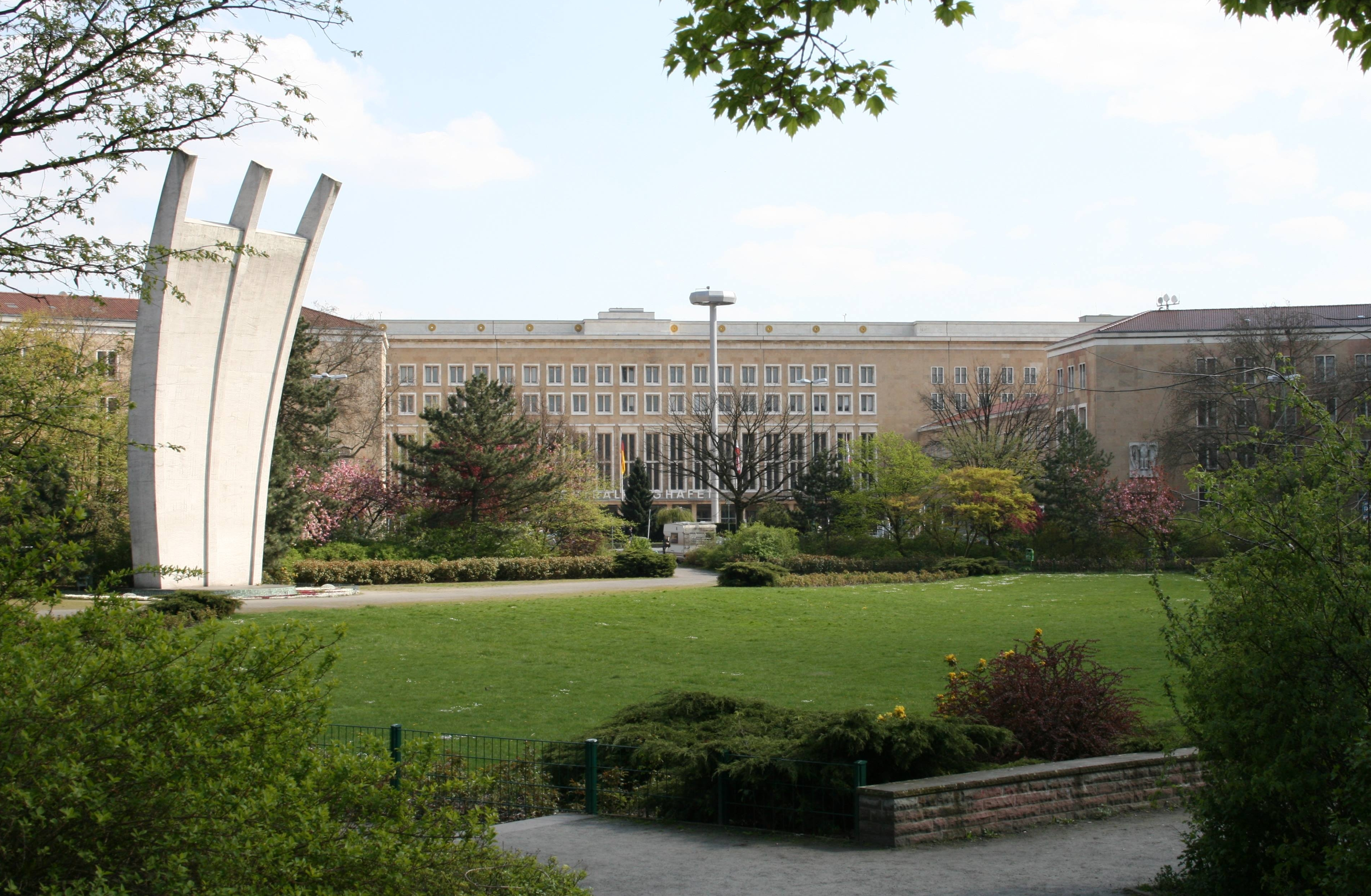
Platz der Luftbrücke: Berlin Airlift Monument by Eduard Ludwig and buildings of former Tempelhof International Airport

Platz der Luftbrücke is a landmarked square and transport node in Berlin, Germany, on the border between the localities of Tempelhof and Kreuzberg. The entrance to the former Tempelhof International Airport is on the square. The buildings around the square are now mostly government agencies, in particular police headquarters. The name of the square commemorates the Berlin airlift of 1948/49 (German: Luftbrücke, 'air bridge') in which Tempelhof was the main airfield used; the Berlin Airlift Monument is in the square.

== Transport ==
The square is the junction of two major traffic arteries, the north-south Bundesstraße 96 (Mehringdamm and Tempelhofer Damm) and the east-west Columbiadamm (to Neukölln) and Dudenstraße (to Schöneberg). Manfred-von-Richthofen-Straße runs from the square southwest to the Neu-Tempelhof Kiez or housing development in Tempelhof.

The Platz der Luftbrücke U-Bahn station is at the north end of the square; called Flughafen (airport) until 1975, it provided a direct connection between the Berlin U-Bahn and the airport (closed in 2008), whose main entrance was in the square.

== Buildings and monuments ==
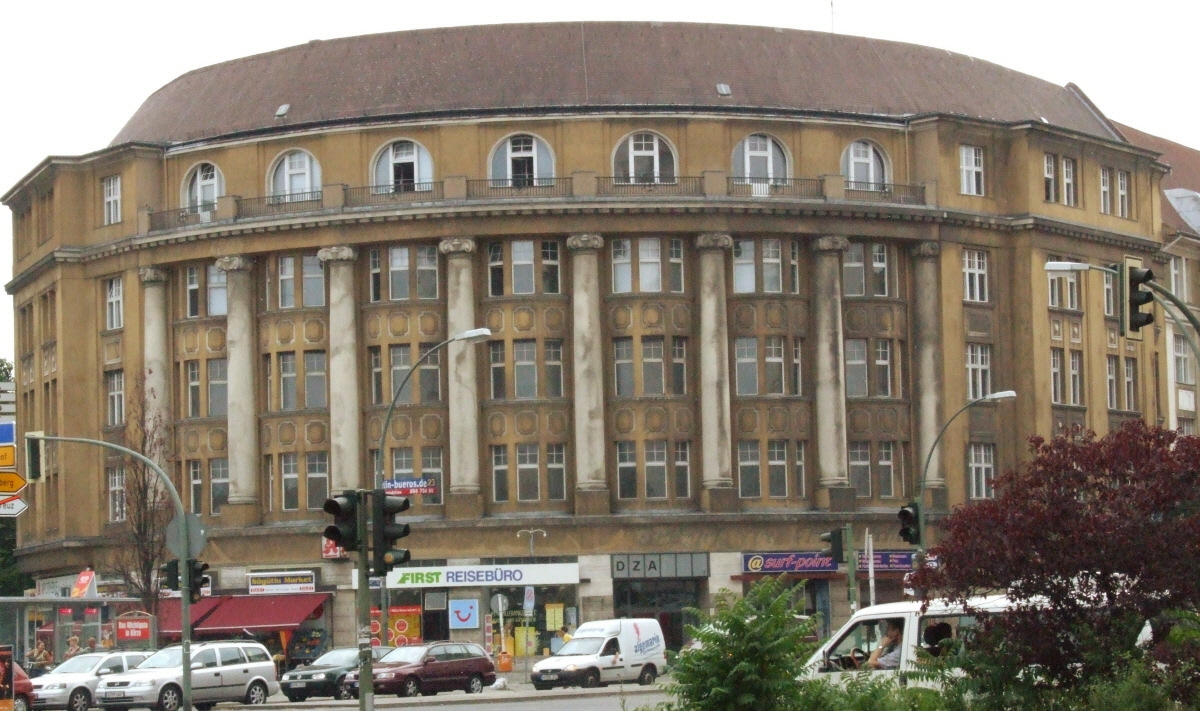
Building designed by Bruno Möhring, corner of Manfred-von-Richthofen-Straße; Deutsches Zentrum für Altersfragen, German Centre of Gerontology

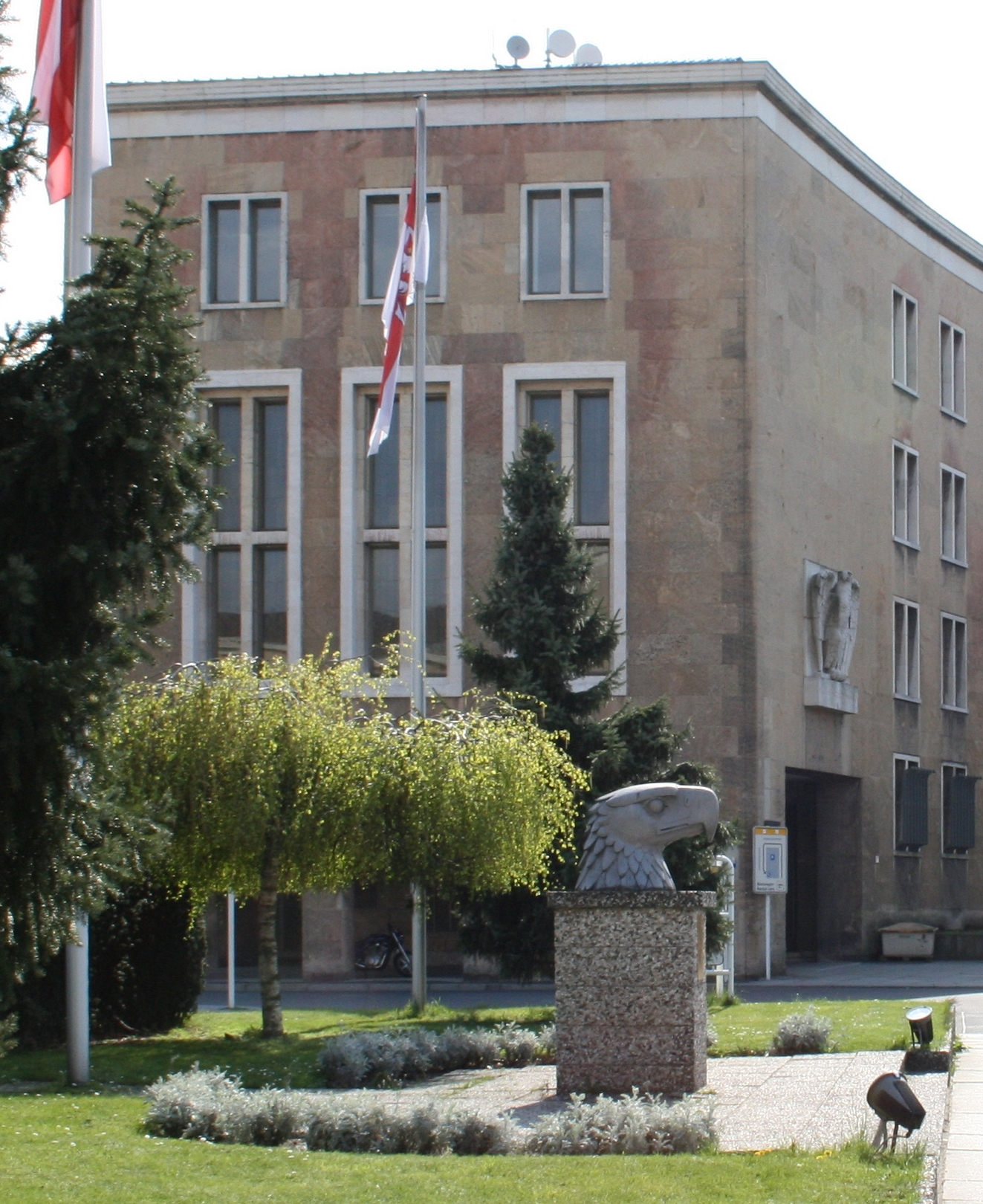
Eagle Square; head of the eagle which formerly stood on the Departure Building, Tempelhof Airport

On the east side of the square are the airport departure building, designed by Ernst Sagebiel, and administration building, in the same style. These prefigure the unrealized designs for the Nazi capital, Welthauptstadt Germania; its North-South Axis would have run approximately 1 km west of the square and the airport entrance would have faced the triumphal arch.

On the southwest side of the square are apartment and business buildings designed by Bruno Möhring in the first phase of the development of the Tempelhof district before the First World War. The Neu-Tempelhof "garden city" development was created inside this ring of 5-storey buildings in the interwar years, designed by Fritz Bräuning.

In front of the airport entrance is the Berlin Airlift Monument (Luftbrückendenkmal; properly the Denkmal für die Opfer der Luftbrücke, 'Monument for the Victims of the Airlift') erected in 1951; it was the first major monument in West Berlin after the war. An inscription on the base records the names and ranks of the 78 people killed in accidents during the Berlin Blockade. Its design, by Eduard Ludwig (who won the contest to design it) features 3 arcs pointing west to symbolise the 3 air corridors that were the city's lifeline, as a result of which Berliners also call it the Hungerkralle (hunger claw) or Hungerharke (hunger rake). An identical counterpart reaching towards Berlin was erected in 1985 by the German-American Airlift Association at the southeast corner of the Frankfurt Airport, directly adjacent to the A5 Autobahn. Since 1988, a smaller copy has also stood at Celle Air Base in Lower Saxony.

Near the entrance to the departure building is a statue of an eagle's head. According to the inscription on the base, this is all that remains of the 4.5 m statue of an eagle, designed by Sagebiel and executed by the sculptor Walter Lemcke, which stood on the roof of the building and was visible from a considerable distance. Contrary to the assumptions of many, it grasped in its claws, not a swastika (like the eagle which symbolized the Third Reich), but a globe (like the planned summit of the Great Hall designed for Germania). In 1962 it was removed to permit the installation of new radar equipment and sent to the museum at the United States Military Academy at West Point. The U.S. Air Force returned it to the people of Berlin and since 1985 the part of the square where it stands has been Eagle Square.

== Institutions on and near the square ==
Former airport buildings now house many government agencies. The headquarters of the Berlin Police occupies buildings in and immediately adjacent to Platz der Luftbrücke, including the Police Praesidium (housed in the southwestern portion of the former airport departure hall, adjacent to Eagle Square), the State Criminal Division, and also the Police Museum (Polizeihistorische Sammlung). The 1939-completed building now called Columbiahaus houses offices of the Deutscher Wetterdienst (German Weather Service), Bundeswertpapierverwaltung (Federal Financial Services Oversight), Hauptzollamt Berlin (Berlin Central Customs Office) Prüfungsamt des Bundes (Testing Service of the Federation) Wasser- und Schifffahrtsamt (Office of Water Transport and Inland Navigation), Wasserstraßenneubauamtes (Watercourse Construction Office) and the Berlin-Brandenburg Zollfahndungsamt (Customs Investigations Office). The central Lost and Found Office for the whole of Berlin is also located in the square.

== History ==
Sagebiel planned a square encircled by buildings of similar heights except for the taller buildings at the airport entrance, and a promenade and series of waterfalls cascading down from the National Monument for the Liberation Wars on the Kreuzberg hill opposite, but his plan was not realised; in the late 1930s the area was a grassy half-circle. The square was given the name Platz der Luftbrücke on 25 June 1949 by Ernst Reuter, the then mayor, and landscaped with a sunken lawn, trees, flowers and a low hedge with an opening to frame the monument. This landscaping has changed several times since the 1950s.

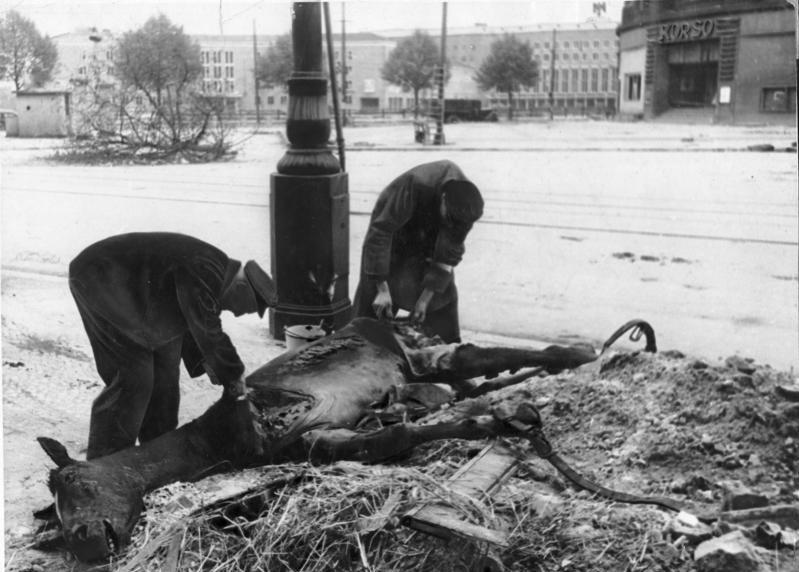
Scavenging a dead horse in front of Tempelhof Airport during the Battle for Berlin, May 1945

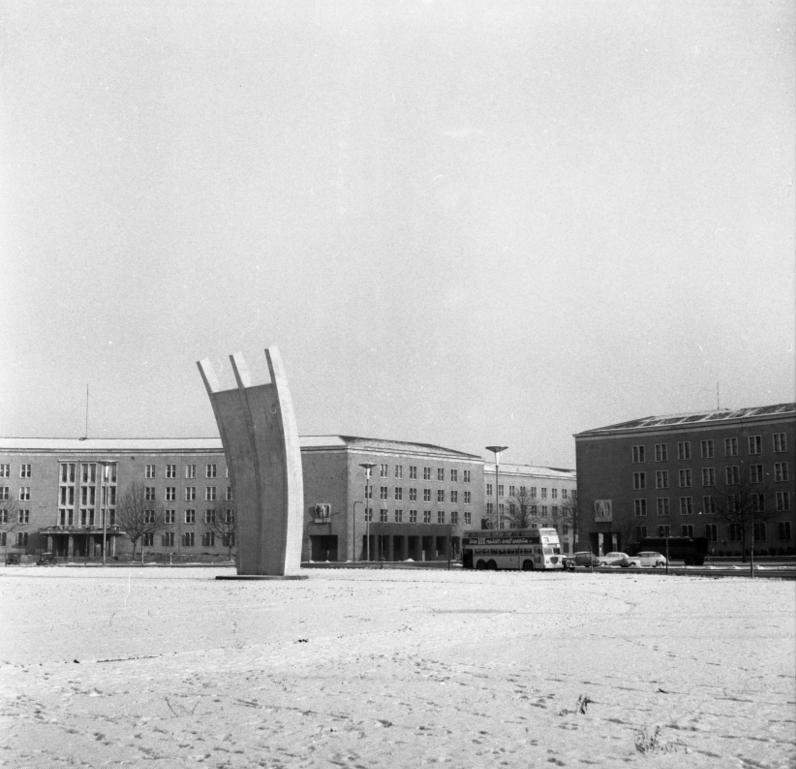
In the snow, January 1954

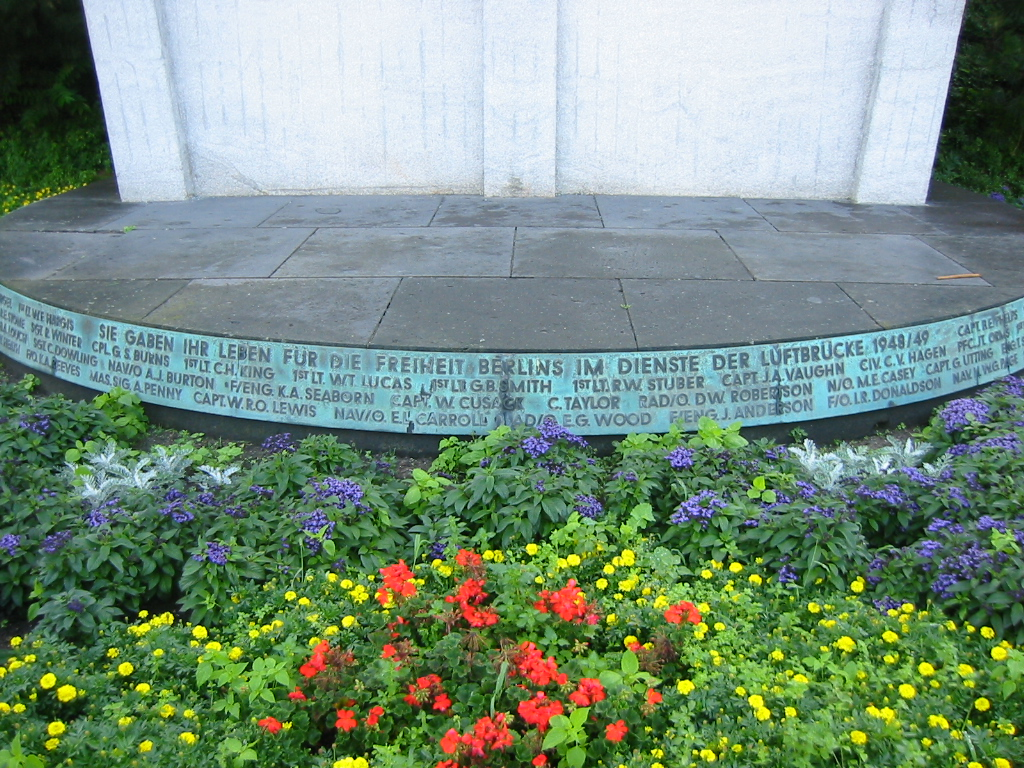
Inscription on base of memorial

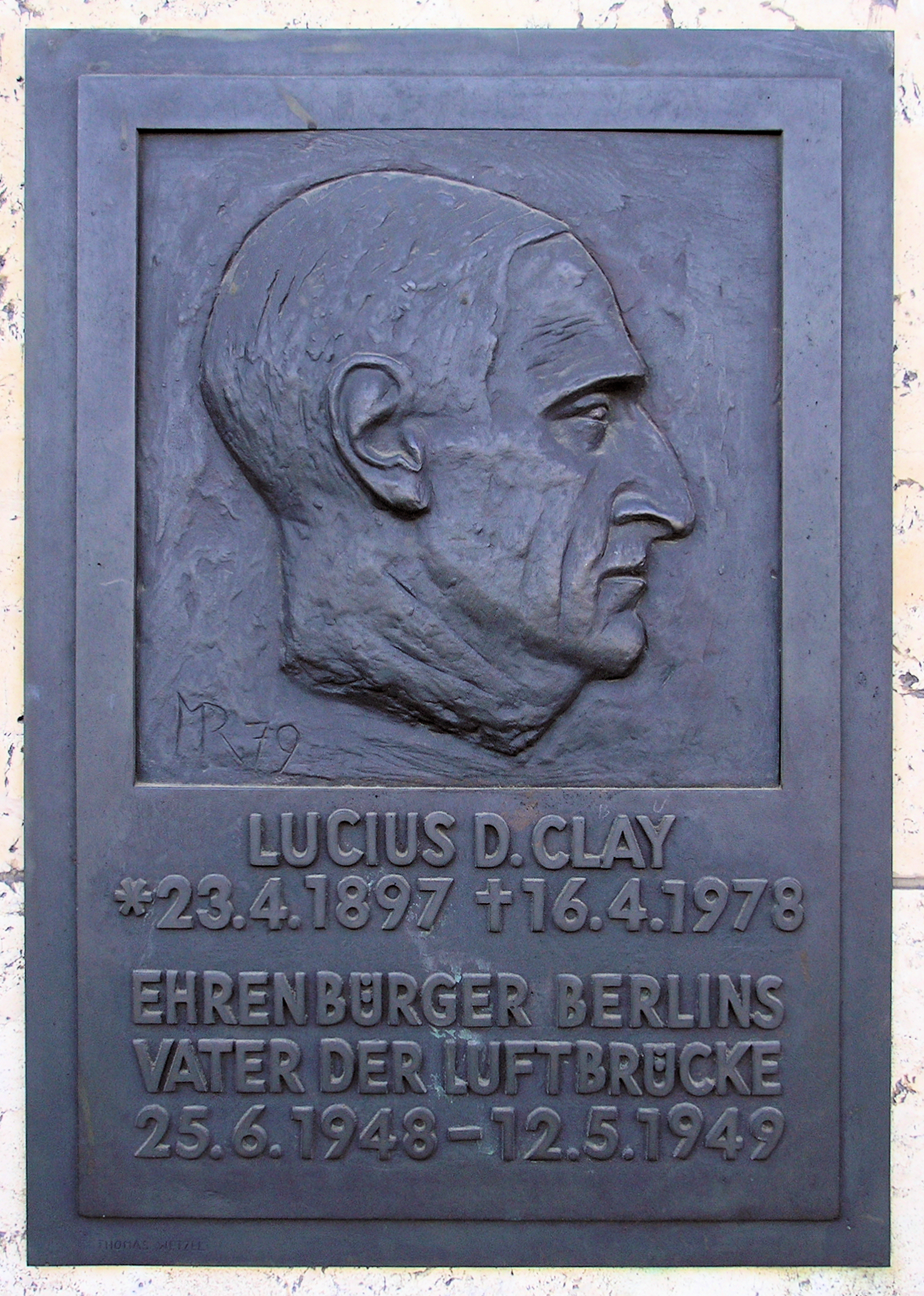
Bronze tablet commemorating General Lucius Clay as 'father of the Berlin Airlift'

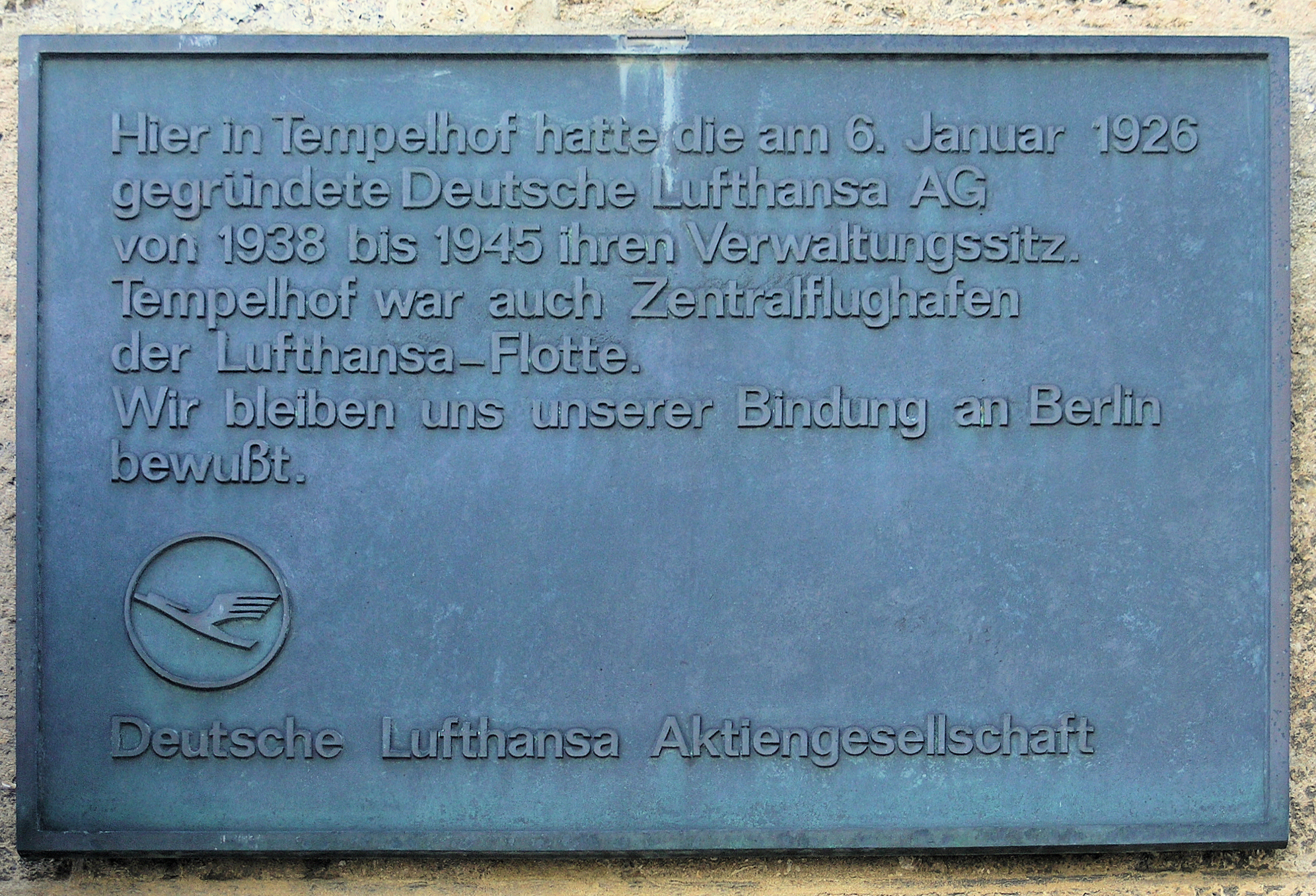
Plaque erected by Lufthansa commemorating their years headquartered at Tempelhof
