= Eduard Ludwig =

German architect

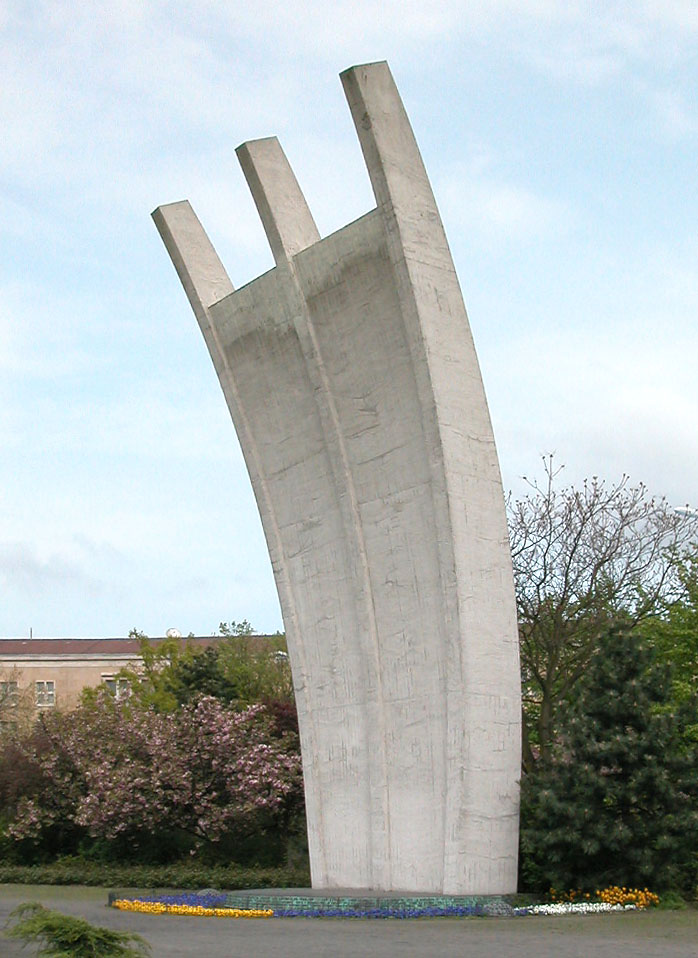
Berlin Airlift Memorial (1951)

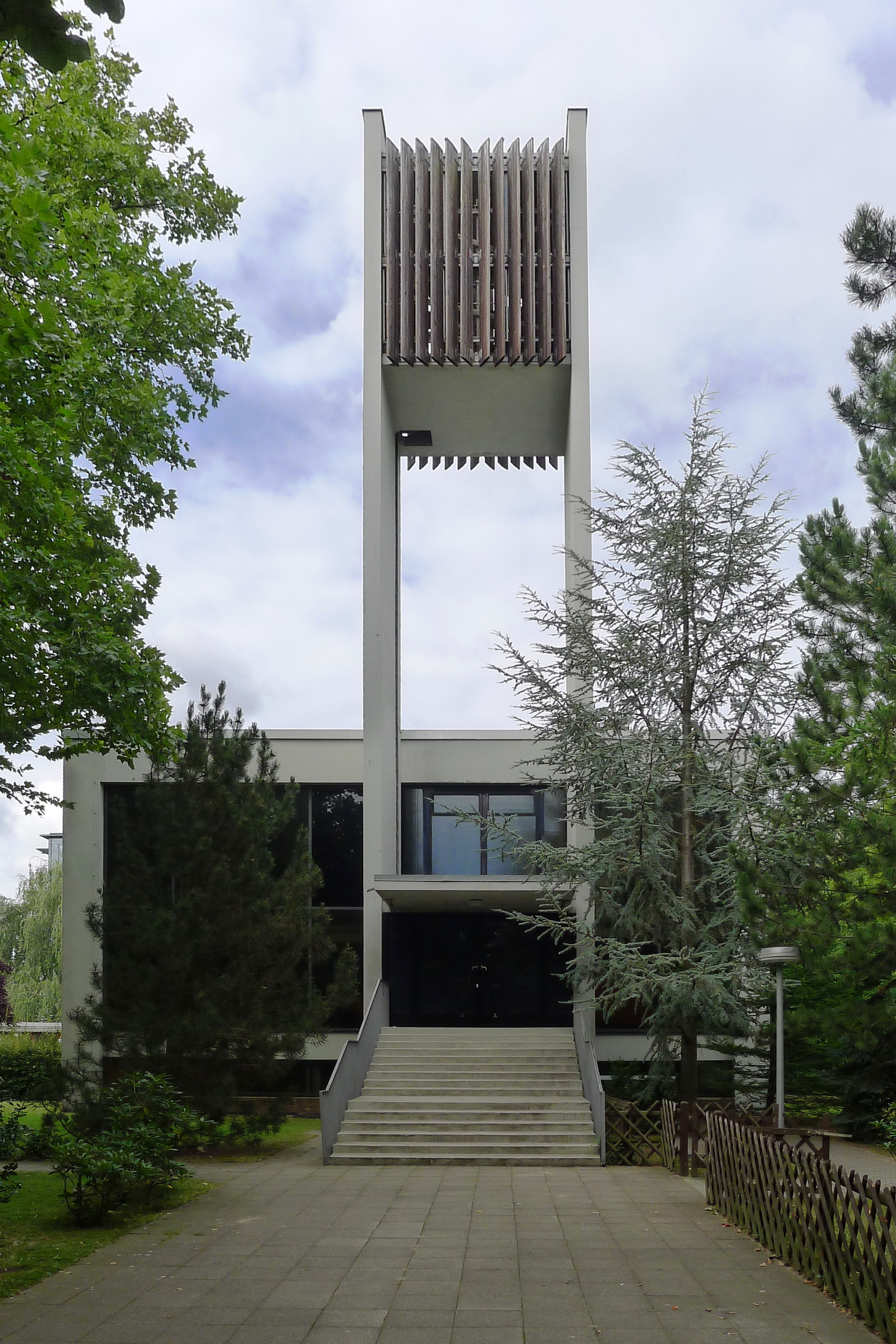
St. Martin's Church, Tegel (1963)

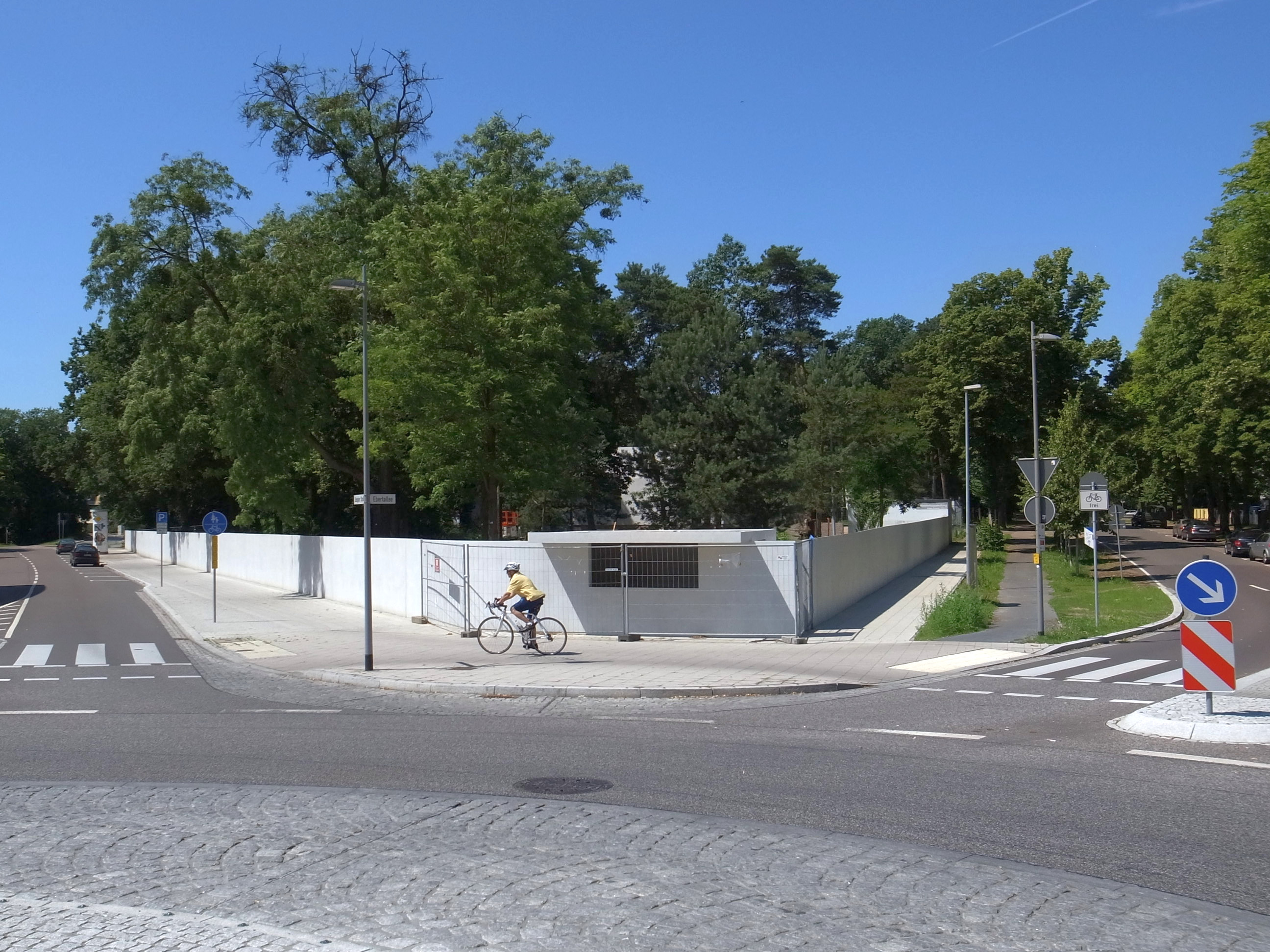
Recreation of the kiosk designed by Ludwig Mies van der Rohe in Dessau (1932); Ludwig executed the working plans.

Eduard Ludwig (24 November 1906 – 28 December 1960) was a German architect. He was a student at the Bauhaus design school and later worked with notable architects from the school. He designed the Berlin Airlift Monument in Platz der Luftbrücke, Berlin.

== Life and career ==
Ludwig was born in Mühlhausen, in Thuringia. His father was a cabinet maker, and he served as his apprentice, then received further training at the handwork school in Blankenburg in the Harz and beginning in 1926 at the Hochschule für Werkkunst Dresden, now part of the Dresden Academy of Fine Arts. He enrolled in the Bauhaus in Dessau in 1928 and graduated from it in 1932. He became one of Ludwig Mies van der Rohe's favourite students, and after graduating worked for him in Berlin until 1937.

Until 1938 he worked for the post office; during World War II, he worked for construction battalions in Crossen an der Oder (now Krosno Odrzańskie, Poland) and then in Berlin, designing air-raid shelters. After the war, in 1946, he became professor at the newly founded architecture school at the Hochschule für bildende Künste in Berlin, now Berlin University of the Arts, while maintaining his own architecture firm.

Ludwig never married. He died in an accident in a bright red sports car on the AVUS, at the age of 54.

== Works ==
Many of Ludwig's Bauhaus-style furniture designs for the Hochschule für bildende Künste were mass-produced and used for decades, and he outfitted some shops on the Kurfurstendamm. For the Bauhaus he designed collapsible furniture, storage and seating for the Dessau savings bank, and made the final design for the planned Borchert department store and drew up the construction plans for the food and drink kiosk at the east end of the demonstration housing complex in Dessau. Designed by Mies van der Rohe, the latter was built in 1932, but demolished in the 1970s; it has been recreated as part of the restoration of the Bauhaus buildings.

He designed the Berlin pavilion for the International Traffic Exhibition in Munich in 1953, consisting of a box of fibre cement on stilts.

He designed many open-plan bungalow houses inspired by Mies van der Rohe's Barcelona Pavilion and also by Sep Ruf. He participated in the 1957 Interbau; a group of five atrium buildings by him remain at Händelallee 26–34 in the Hansaviertel. He moved into one such bungalow residence himself, and co-designed one for Expo 58 in Brussels the following year.

Ludwig won out over 324 others in the competition to design the monument to those who died during the Berlin Airlift of 1948–49, although for reasons of cost and materials shortages, the aluminium cladding he had specified was replaced with reinforced concrete. He also designed the sans serif typeface for the inscription at the base listing the dead. A proposal to add a plaque in his memory to the Berlin monument has not been carried out.

His design was also selected for what is now the Protestant Church of St. Martin in the Tegel district of Berlin, which was completed after his death by his friend and colleague Karl Otto. The church is a rectangular building with a reinforced concrete skeleton, its belltower mounted on arc-shaped concrete supports rising from either side of the entrance steps.

More than 120 of Ludwig's designs and drawings have been acquired by the Bauhaus Foundation for their collection.
