= Platz der Luftbrücke station =

Station of the Berlin U-Bahn

Coordinates: 52°29′08″N 13°23′09″E

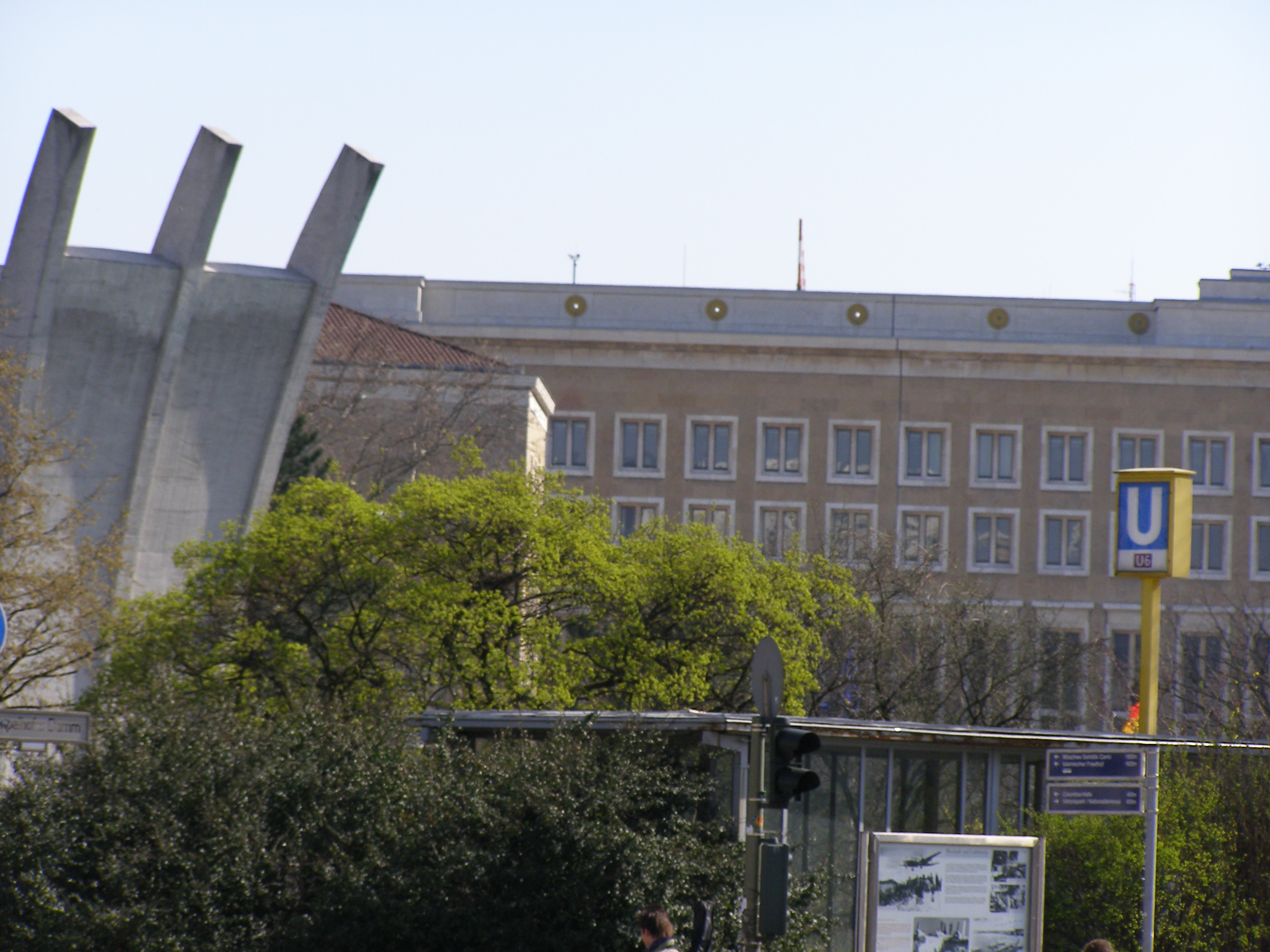
Entrance to Platz der Luftbrücke U-Bahn station, with Airlift Memorial

Platz der Luftbrücke is a Berlin U-Bahn station located on the U6. It is located under Platz der Luftbrücke and the south end of Mehringdamm on the border between Kreuzberg and Tempelhof, near the former Tempelhof International Airport, and is now named for the square there with its memorial to the victims of the Berlin Airlift.

== Station ==
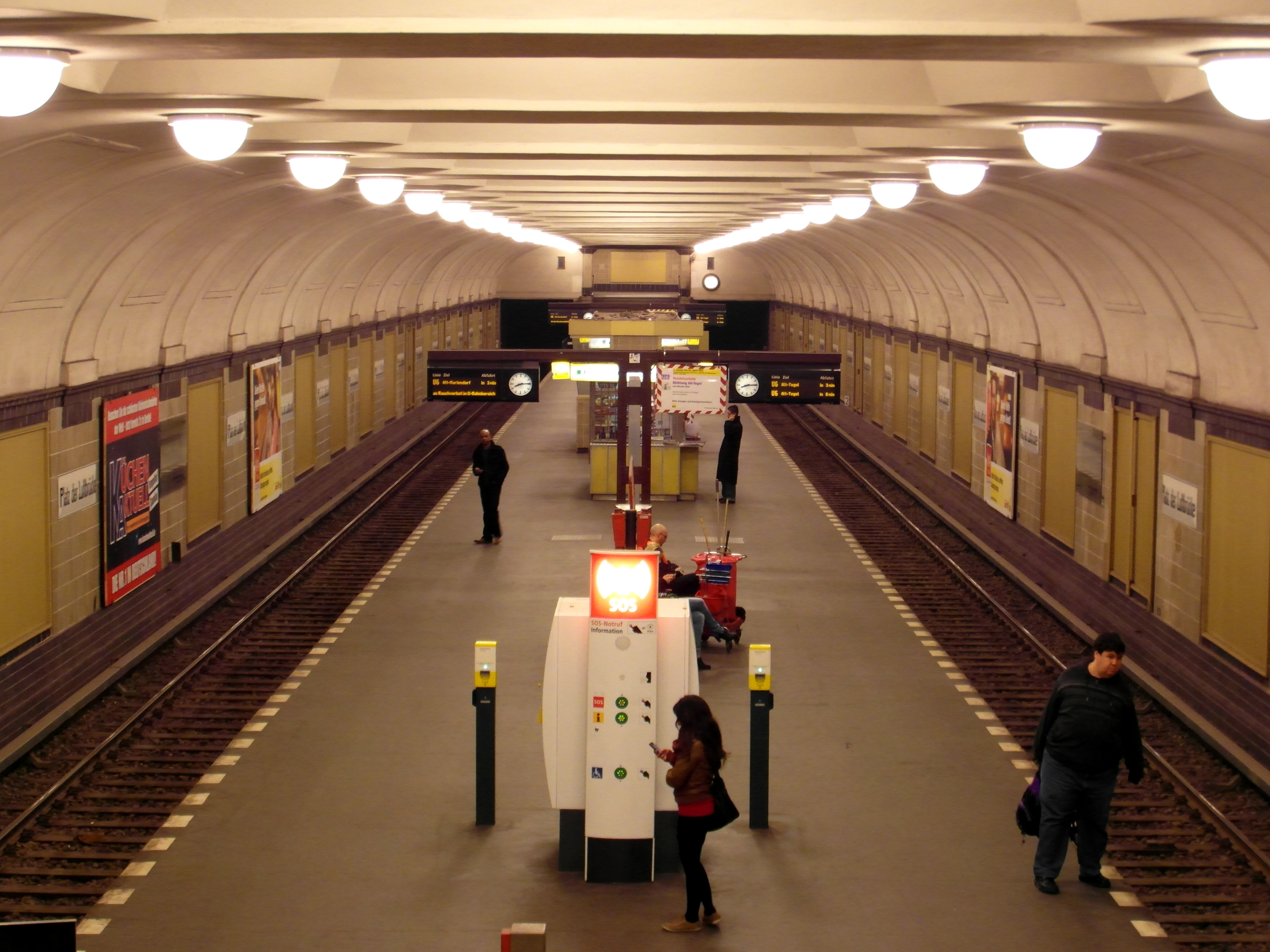
View of the station platform from the stairs (before renovation)

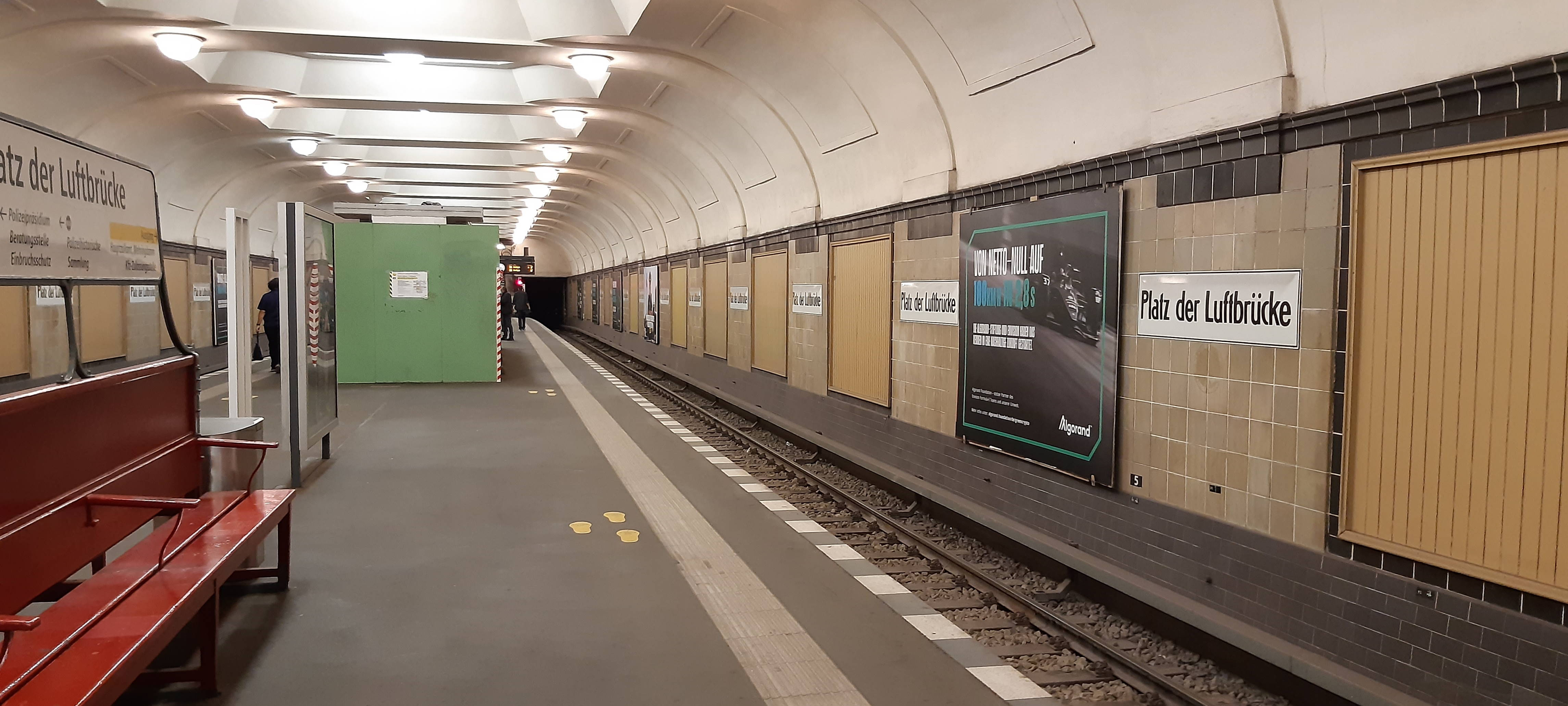
Platform view in May 2022

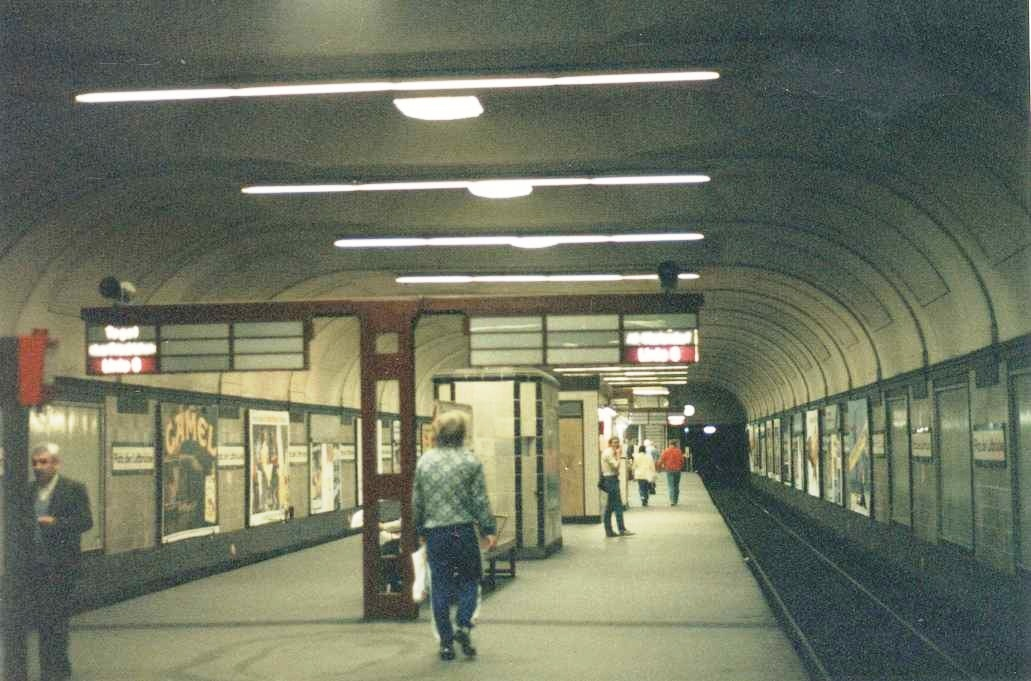
U-Bahnhof Platz der Luftbrücke, 1988, facing south towards Alt-Mariendorf (right side of platform). Northbound is left side of platform towards Alt-Tegel via Friedrichstraße

The station was designed by Alfred Grenander. For topographic reasons, it lies unusually deep underground and the station was therefore constructed with an unusually high vault and long platform. Grenander made exceptionally expressive use of the play of light and shadow in the vaulting and its supports. It is one of only 2 Berlin U-Bahn stations with no central columns, the other being Märkisches Museum. It is tiled in grey with black accents.

There are four entrances, one at the north end on Mehringdamm and three on Platz der Luftbrücke.

== History ==
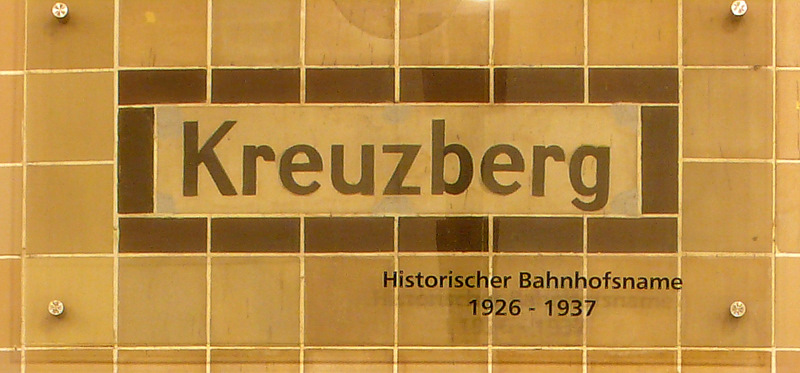
Sign with the former station name "Kreuzberg"

The station opened on 14 February 1926 and was then called Kreuzberg (after the hill which gives the district its name; it is on the edge of the district). Two old wall signs with that name, uncovered in renovation, have been preserved under glass. It was the terminus of Line C^{II} (today U6) until the opening of Paradestraße station on 10 September 1927. The latter was originally called Flughafen (Airport). However, in 1937 that station received its current name and the Kreuzberg station was renamed Flughafen. It had a direct connection to Tempelhof Airport, at that time unique in the world; it remained the connection between the airport and the city's public transport system until the airport closed in October 2008.

In 1975, it was renamed a second time, after the square above, West Berlin's civil aviation having shifted to Tegel Airport.

The platform was extended in 1971, and in 1990 the station was renovated and re-tiled and a new lift was installed.

In May 2020 extensive renovations began to provide step-free access to the platforms from the street, as part of wider landscaping improvements in the area. The first phase - involving platform renovations is due to be completed in 2021.

Preceding station	Berlin U-Bahn	Following station
Mehringdamm towards Alt-Tegel	U6	Paradestraße towards Alt-Mariendorf
