= Paradestraße station =

Station of the Berlin U-Bahn

Coordinates: 52°28′41″N 13°23′10″E

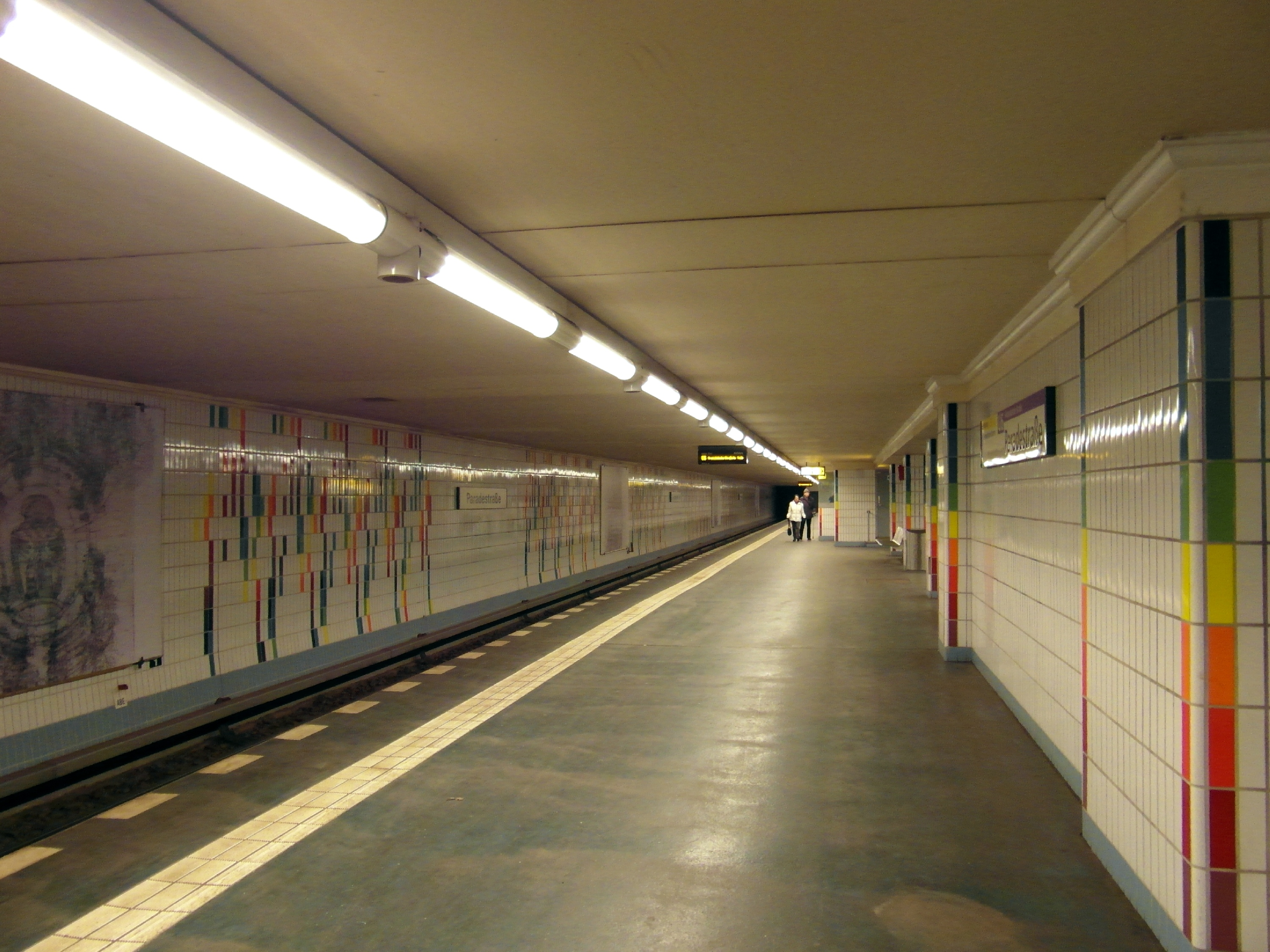
The platform at Paradestraße station; the coloured tiles are in the colours of the lines of the Berlin U-Bahn system

Paradestraße is a Berlin U-Bahn station on the U6 line. It was opened in 1927 as Flughafen (airport) and was the world's first metro station designed to serve an airport (Tempelhof Airport).

== History ==
The station opened on 10 September 1927, taking over as the southern terminus of the north-south line from Kreuzberg, now Platz der Luftbrücke. It remained the terminus until 1929, when the extension reached Tempelhof. As indicated by its original name, Flughafen, it was intended to provide access to Tempelhof Airport. The platform is broad and four of the stairs from it led to a large mezzanine from which two exits led towards the airport, for the use of both passengers and flight show spectators. A pedestrian tunnel connecting directly to the airport terminal building, which at the time lay roughly one kilometer to the east, was planned but never built.

However, the airport was rebuilt in the 1930s, both because it proved too small and because part of Hitler's plan for converting Berlin into Welthauptstadt Germania was for the main entrance to the airport to be aligned with the triumphal arch on the North-South Axis. The station was no longer in the correct position and in January 1937 was renamed Paradestraße; the Kreuzberg station became the new connection between the U-Bahn and the airport and was renamed Flughafen. The eastern exits at Paradestraße were sealed and the mezzanine reduced in size. The Berliner Verkehrsbetriebe (Berlin Transport) used the closed-off portion as a shooting gallery.

On 28/29 January 1944, there was a direct hit in the ceiling of the platform hall. The ceiling collapses on 29 April 1944, this is the second ceiling opening in this station. The damage to the track and station facilities is now so sustainable that an orderly underground operation is no longer possible even in the longer term. At some stations, the subway can no longer hold or some routes are so destructive that the operation had to be completely shut down.

In 1946 the city planned to rename the station again, to Franz-Werfel-Straße, and even made the change on street maps, but it was never actually changed.

In the early 1990s, one of the two remaining stairways from the street to the station was replaced with a lift, leaving only one exit in case of fire. The station now again has 2 stairways in addition to a lift.

The extension of the line south to Kreuzberg and Flughafen, and later beyond, was originally known as C^{II}. In 1966 it became known as Line 6 and in 1986 as U6.

== Design ==
The station was designed by Alfred Grenander and was originally sandy-coloured. Around 1992, it was retiled in small white tiles with multicoloured accents representing the colours of all the Berlin U-Bahn lines, making it one of the most colourful stations in the system.

Preceding station	Berlin U-Bahn	Following station
Platz der Luftbrücke towards Alt-Tegel	U6	Tempelhof towards Alt-Mariendorf
