= 19th-century domes =

Domes built in the 19th century benefited from more efficient techniques for iron production and steel production, as well as advances in structural analysis. Metal-framed domes of the 19th century often imitated earlier masonry dome designs in a variety of styles, especially in church architecture, but were also used to create glass domes over shopping arcades and hothouses, domes over locomotive sheds and exhibition halls, and domes larger than any others in the world. The variety of domed buildings, such as parliaments and capitol buildings, gasometers, observatories, libraries, and churches, were enabled by the use of reinforced concrete ribs, lightweight papier-mâché, and triangulated framing.

== Developments ==
=== Materials ===
New production techniques allowed for cast iron and wrought iron to be produced both in larger quantities and at relatively low prices during the Industrial Revolution. Most iron domes were built with curved iron ribs arranged radially from the top of the dome to a ring at the base. The material of choice for domes changed over the course of the 19th century from cast iron to wrought iron to steel. Excluding domes that simply imitated multi-shell masonry, the century's chief development of the simple domed form may be metal-framed domes such as the circular dome of Halle au Blé in Paris and the elliptical dome of the Royal Albert Hall in London.

The practice of building rotating domes for housing large telescopes became popular in the 19th century, with early examples using papier-mâché to minimize weight.

Beginning in the late 19th century, the Guastavino family, a father and son team who worked on the eastern seaboard of the United States, further developed the masonry dome. They perfected a traditional Spanish and Italian technique for light, center-less vaulting using layers of tiles in fast-setting cement set flat against the surface of the curve, rather than perpendicular to it. The father, Rafael Guastavino, innovated with the use of Portland cement as the mortar, rather than the traditional lime and gypsum mortars, which allowed mild steel bar to be used to counteract tension forces.

Although domes made entirely from reinforced concrete were not built before 1900, the church of Saint-Jean-de-Montmartre was designed by Anatole de Baudot with a small brick shell dome with reinforced concrete ribs. St. Ursula Parish Church in Munich, Germany, was built between 1894 and 1897 with a dome of two lightweight concrete shells, using reinforcing rings only in the underlying octagonal tambour. The 11.2-meter-wide (37 ft) hemispherical inner dome is 15 cm thick with eight ribs on its outer surface increasing that thickness to 29 cm. The outer octagonal cloister vault is 11.8 meters wide and 16 cm thick. An artificial stone called "Schwemm-stein" was used as a porous aggregate. Neither dome included reinforcement, although iron bars have been detected at irregular distances in the outer dome that may have been part of the formwork needed for the building process, and which may act as partial reinforcement. Other concrete domes at this time included a music pavilion in Hoppegarten (1887–1888), the Monier-dome of the mausoleum of Emperor Frederick III in Potsdam (1889), and a dome above the foyer of the Brunner banking house in Brussels (1892–1895).

=== Structure ===
Proportional rules for an arch's thickness to span ratio were developed during the 19th century, based on catenary shape changes in response to weight loads, and these were applied to the vertical forces in domes. The first studies on domes' limit thickness were published in 1855 by Kobell. Mathematical analysis of domes were published by Eytelwein (1808), Dietlein (1823), Persy (1834), Kobell (1855), Scheffler (1857), and Michon (1857), but the methods were not used by architects and engineers. Edmund Beckett Denison, who had published a proof on the subject in 1871, wrote in a Domes article in the Ninth Edition of the Encyclopædia Britannica that the thickness to span ratio was lower for a dome than it was for an arch due to the more distributed loads of a dome. The first studies of collapse mechanisms for domes were published in 1877 by Beckett. Ideas on linear elasticity were formalized in the 19th century. The first graphical analysis of domes was published in 1879 by Wittmann, allowing the line of thrust to be determined, and it was used by other German authors. The 1878 graphical method by Henry Turner Eddy to calculate compressive and tensile hoop forces was applied to masonry domes of revolution in any form in 1881 by August Föppl and it was used in America beginning around 1900.

The span of the ancient Pantheon dome, although matched during the Renaissance, remained the largest in the world until the middle of the 19th century. The large domes of the 19th century included exhibition buildings and functional structures such as gasometers and locomotive sheds.

Domes made of radial trusses were analyzed with a "plane frame" approach, rather than considering three dimensions, until an 1863 Berlin gasometer dome design by engineer Johann Wilhelm Schwedler that became known as the "Schwedler dome". He published the theory behind five such domes and a structural calculation technique in 1866. Schwedler's work on these axially symmetric shells was expanded by August Föppl in 1892 to apply to "other shell-type truss frameworks". By the 1860s and 1870s, German and other European engineers began to treat iron domes as collections of short straight beams with hinged ends, resulting in light openwork structures. Other than in glasshouses, these structures were usually hidden behind ceilings. Dome types that used lengths of rolled steel with riveted joints included "Schwedler domes", "Zimmermann domes", "lattice domes", and "Schlink domes".

According to Irene Giustina, dome construction was one of the most challenging architectural problems until at least the end of the 19th century, due to a lack of knowledge about statics. Rafael Guastavino's use of the recent development of graphic statics enabled him to design and build inexpensive funicular domes with minimal thickness and no scaffolding. The vaults were typically 3 inches thick and workers, standing on the completed portions, used simple templates, wires, and strings to align their work.

=== Style ===
The historicism of the 19th century led to many domes being re-translations of the great domes of the past, rather than further stylistic developments, especially in sacred architecture. The Neoclassical style popular at this time was challenged in the middle of the 19th century by a Gothic Revival in architecture, in what has been termed the "Battle of the Styles". This lasted from about 1840 to the beginning of the 20th century, with various styles within Classicism, such as Renaissance, Baroque, and Rococo revivals, also vying for popularity. The last three decades of this period included unusual combinations of these styles.

== Religious and royal buildings ==
The Royal Stables at Brighton Pavilion were designed by William Porden and built from 1804 to 1808 in an Orientalist style for the Prince of Wales. The circular courtyard of the stable block, 26 metres (85 ft) in diameter, was domed with laminated timber and glass, evidently inspired by the similar dome over the Halle aux blés in Paris. The three-layer wooden ribs were supported horizontally by wooden purlins and iron chains. An oculus was covered by a lantern shaped as a coronet on the exterior. It was converted into a concert hall in 1934 and redecorated in an Art Deco style.

The rotunda dome of the Church of the Holy Sepulchre in Jerusalem was replaced from 1808 to 1810 after a fire and replaced again from 1868 to 1870. The dome completed in 1870 was a Russian design made with wrought iron arches.

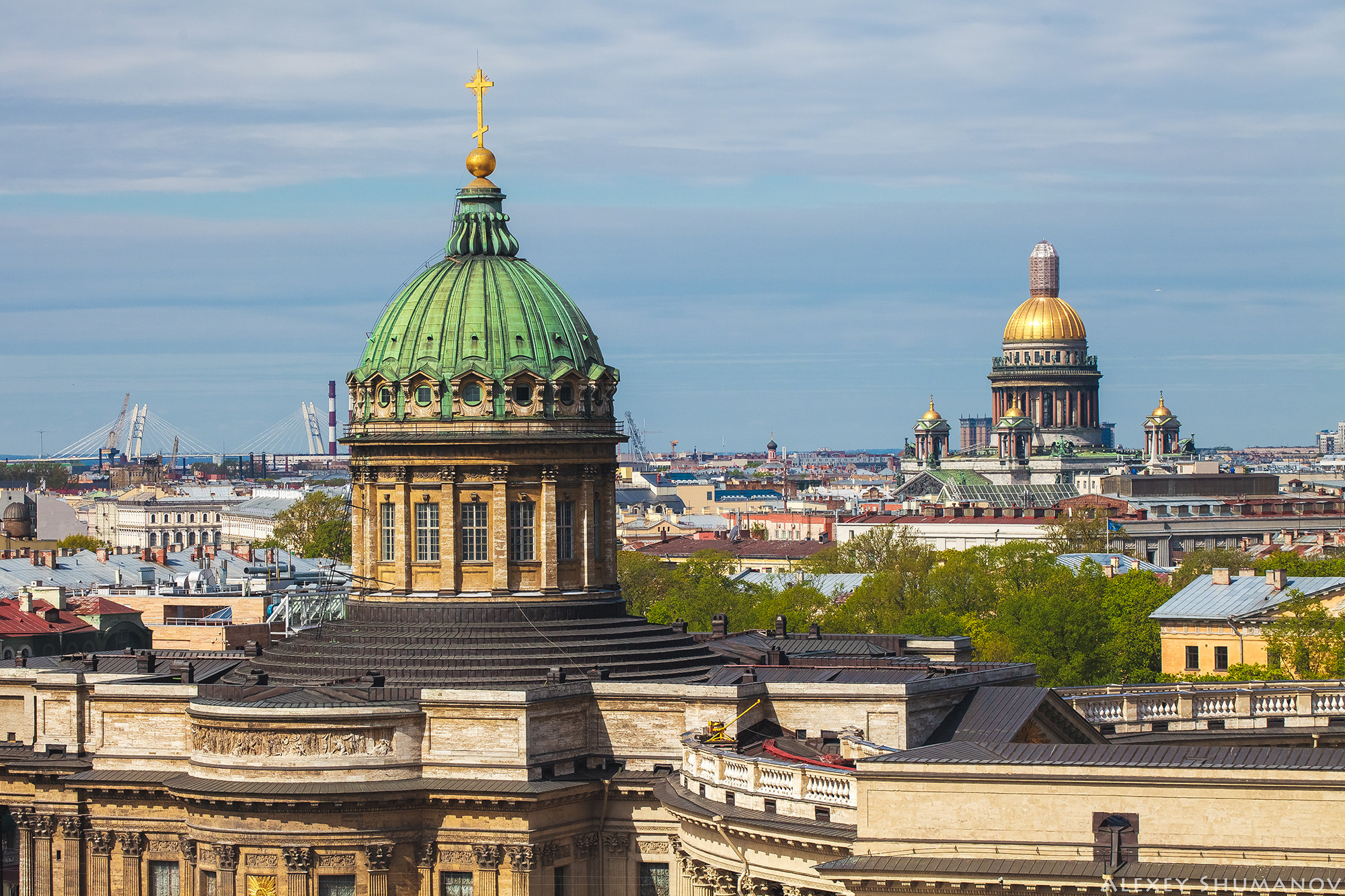
Kazan Cathedral and Saint Isaac's Cathedral (background) in Russia.

Iron domes offered the lightness of timber construction along with incombustibility and higher strength, allowing for larger spans. Because domes themselves were relatively rare, the first examples made from iron date well after iron began to be used as a structural material. Iron was used in place of wood where fire resistance was a priority. In Russia, which had large supplies of iron, some of the earliest examples of the material's architectural use can be found. Andrey Voronikhin built a large wrought iron dome over Kazan Cathedral in Saint Petersburg. Built between 1806 and 1811, the 17.7-meter-wide (58 ft) outer dome of the cathedral was one of the earliest iron domes. The iron outer dome covers two masonry inner domes and is made of 15 mm thick sheets set end to end.

St. George's Church in Edinburgh was built from 1811 to 1814 by Robert Reid with a dome modeled after that of St. Paul's Cathedral. An early example of an iron dome in Britain is the fanciful iron-framed dome over the central building of the Royal Pavilion in Brighton, begun in 1815 by John Nash, the personal architect of King George IV. The dome was not one of the prominent onion domes but instead the dome-like structure of twelve cast iron ribs resting on cast iron columns over Henry Holland's earlier saloon. It was completed in 1818–1819.

The neoclassical Baltimore Basilica, designed by Benjamin Henry Latrobe like the Roman Pantheon for Bishop John Carroll, was begun in 1806 and dedicated in 1821, although the porch and towers would not be completed until the 1870s. An influence on the interior design may have been the Church of St. Mary in East Lulworth, England, where Bishop Carroll had been consecrated. The central dome is 22 metres (72 ft) in diameter and 16 metres (52 ft) above the nave floor. The onion domes over the two towers were built according to Latrobe's designs. The church was extended to the east by 10 metres (33 ft) in 1890. Before initial construction of the church was completed, two other neoclassical domed churches would be built in Baltimore. The First Independent (Unitarian) Church by Maximilian Godefroy was begun in 1817 and covered the interior space with a 55-foot-wide (17 m) shallow coffered dome on pendentives with an oculus at the center. To improve acoustics, the interior was modified. The First Baptist Church by Robert Mills, also known as "Old Red Top Church", was a domed cylindrical rotunda with a porch block and portico. The dome had a shallow exterior profile and its oculus was covered by a low lantern, called a monitor. It was completed in 1818 but demolished in 1878.

In 1828, the eastern crossing tower of Mainz Cathedral was rebuilt by Georg Moller with a wrought iron dome. The dome was made of flat iron sections and reinforced with ties that passed through the interior of the dome. Such dome reinforcement was one of the two established techniques, the other being the use of a combination of horizontal rings and vertical ribs. The span may have been about 27 meters. It was later removed in favor of the current structure.

The Altes Museum in Berlin, built in 1828 by Karl Schinkel, included a dome in its entrance hall inspired by the Roman Pantheon.

Large neoclassical domes include the Rotunda of Mosta in Malta, was completed in 1840 with a dome 38 meters wide, and San Carlo al Corso in Milan, completed in 1847 with a dome 32 meters wide.

In Galicia, the Basilian monastic pilgrimage church at Hoshiv was built from 1834 to 1842 as a large domed rotunda with four rectangular annexes in a cruciform plan, combining the central plan popular with classicist trends in Central Europe with the cross-domed plans held to be characteristic of eastern orthodox architecture. Ruthenian Greek Catholic churches were built as tripartite churches with a dome over each of the three parts, such as the Church of the Nativity of the Blessed Virgin Mary in Przemyśl (1863–1864), or as cross-domed plans, such as St. Michael's Church at Kolomyia (1855). Beginning around 1883, Vasyl Nahirnyi began to combine these traditional forms with the Neo-Byzantine style of Theophil Hansen, "borrowing the motifs of umbrella dome, portico, multi-mullioned windows, and arcaded friezes". He built more than 200 churches in Galicia, establishing a uniformity of Greek Catholic churches there to the extent of influencing the work of other architects. Examples include his Greek Catholic parish churches of Kuryłówka (1895) and Nowy Lubliniec (1898). Seeking a more original design, the church building committee of Zniessinie commissioned Władysław Halicki to build its 1897 cross-domed parish church.

Saint Isaac's Cathedral, in Saint Petersburg, was built by 1842 with one of the largest domes in Europe. A cast iron dome nearly 26 meters wide, it had a technically advanced triple-shell design with iron trusses reminiscent of St. Paul's Cathedral in London. The design for the cathedral was begun after the defeat of Napoleon in 1815 and given to a French architect, but construction was delayed. Although the dome was originally designed to be masonry, cast iron was used instead.

Also reminiscent of St. Paul's dome and that of the Panthéon in Paris, both of which the original designer had visited, the dome of St. Nicholas' Church in Potsdam was added to the building from 1843 to 1849. A dome was included as a possibility in the original late Neoclassical design of 1830, but as a wooden construction. Iron was used instead by the later architects.

Other examples of framed iron domes include those of a synagogue in Berlin, by Schwedler in 1863, and the Bode Museum by Muller-Breslau in 1907.

The wrought-iron dome of the Royal Albert Hall in London was built from 1867 to 1871 over an elliptical plan by the architect Henry Young Darracott Scott and structural design by Rowland Mason Ordish. It uses a set of curved trusses, like those of the earlier New Street Station in Birmingham, interrupted in the middle by a drum. The elliptical dome's span is 66.9 meters by 56.5 meters.

The wrought-iron dome of the church of Saint-Augustin in Paris dates from 1870 and spans 25.2 meters. A wrought-iron dome was also built over Jerusalem's Holy Sepulchre in 1870, spanning 23 meters.

The dome over the Basilica of San Gaudenzio (begun in 1577) in Novara, Italy, was built between 1844 and 1880. Revisions by the architect during construction transformed what was initially going to be a drum, hemispherical dome, and lantern 42.22 meters tall into a structure with two superimposed drums, an ogival dome, and a thirty meter tall spire reaching 117.5 meters. The architect, Alessandro Antonelli, who also built the Mole Antonelliana in Turin, Italy, combined Neoclassical forms with the vertical emphasis of the Gothic style. It has an internal diameter of 14 meters and an outer diameter of 22 meters. Although the two-shell dome cross section has arches very similar to a catenary and the thrust line is contained within the dome's masonry, the light and complex construction has had many stability problems.

The 1881 Dutch rebuilding of the Baiturrahman Grand Mosque, destroyed during the Aceh War, introduced the Indian style dome in place of the previous traditional Indonesian tumpanf roof.

A large dome was built in 1881–1882 over the circular courtyard of the Devonshire Royal Hospital in England with a diameter of 48 metres (156 ft). It used radial trussed ribs with no diagonal ties.

The dome of Pavia Cathedral, a building started in 1488, was completed with a large octagonal dome joined to the basilica plan of the church.

== Commercial buildings ==
Although iron production in France lagged behind Britain, the government was eager to foster the development of its domestic iron industry. In 1808, the government of Napoleon approved a plan to replace the burnt down wooden dome of the Halle au Blé granary in Paris with a dome of iron and glass, the "earliest example of metal with glass in a dome". The dome was 37 meters in diameter and used 51 cast iron ribs to converge on a wrought iron compression ring 11 meters wide containing a glass and wrought iron skylight. The outer surface of the dome was covered with copper, with additional windows cut near the dome's base to admit more light during an 1838 modification. Cast-iron domes were particularly popular in France.

In the United States, an 1815 commission to build the Baltimore Exchange and Custom House was awarded to Benjamin Henry Latrobe and Maximilian Godefroy for their design featuring a prominent central dome. The dome design was altered during construction to raise its height to 35 metres (115 ft) by adding a tall drum and work was completed in 1822. Signals from an observatory on Federal Hill were received at an observation post in the dome, providing early notice of arriving merchant vessels. The building was demolished in 1901–2.

The Coal Exchange in London, by James Bunstone Bunning from 1847 to 1849, included a dome 18 meters wide made from 32 iron ribs cast as single pieces. It was demolished in the early 1960s.

Large temporary domes were built in 1862 for London's International Exhibition Building, spanning 48.8 meters. The Leeds Corn Exchange, built in 1862 by Cuthbert Brodrick, features an elliptical plan dome 38.9 meters by 26.7 meters with wrought iron ribs along the long axis that radiate from the ends and others spanning the short axis that run parallel to each other, forming a grid pattern.

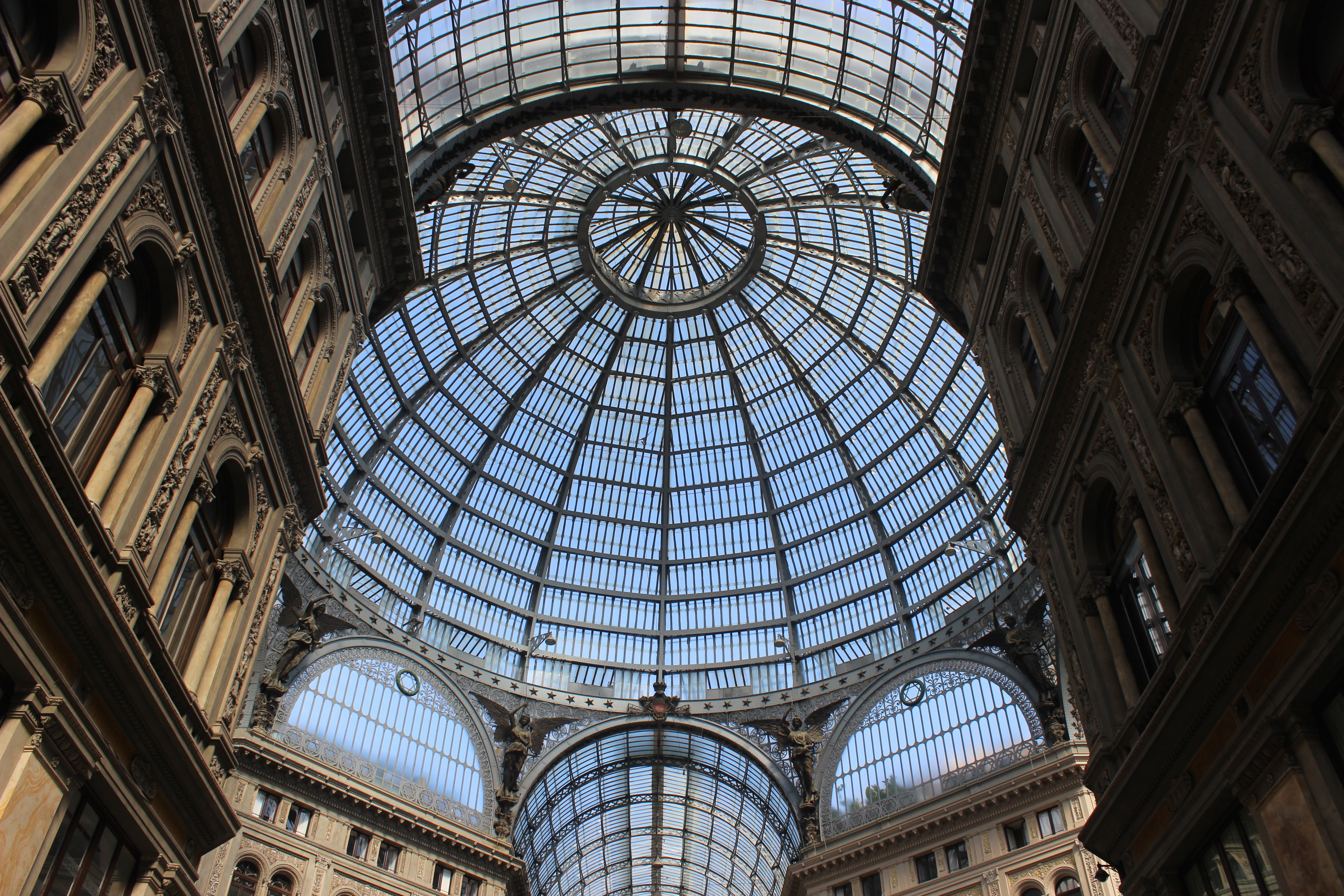
The Galleria Umberto I in Naples.

Elaborate covered shopping arcades, such as the Galleria Vittorio Emanuele II in Milan and the Galleria Umberto I in Naples, included large glazed domes at their cross intersections. The dome of the Galleria Vittorio Emanuele II (1863–1867) rises to 44 metres (145 ft) above the ground and has the same span as the dome of St. Peter's Basilica, with sixteen iron ribs over an octagonal space at the intersection of two covered streets. It is named after the first king of a united Italy.

The span of the metal-framed Galerie des machines at the Paris Exposition of 1889 was 111 meters.

The central market hall in Leipzig was built by 1891 with the first application of the "lattice dome" roof system developed by August Föppl from 1883. The dome covered an irregular pentagonal plan and was about 20 meters wide and 6.8 meters high.

Vladimir Shukhov was an early pioneer of what would later be called gridshell structures and in 1897 he employed them in domed exhibit pavilions at the All-Russia Industrial and Art Exhibition.

The dome of Sydney's Queen Victoria Building uses radial ribs of steel along with redundant diagonal bracing to span 20 meters. It was claimed to be the largest dome in the Southern Hemisphere when completed in 1898.

== Greenhouses and conservatories ==
Iron and glass glasshouses with curved roofs were popular for a few decades beginning shortly before 1820 to maximize orthogonality to the sun's rays, although only a few have domes. The conservatory at Syon Park was one of the earliest and included a 10.8-meter-span (35 ft) iron and glass dome by Charles Fowler built between 1820 and 1827. The glass panes are set in panels joined by copper or brass ribs between the 23 main cast iron ribs. Another example was the conservatory at Bretton Hall in Yorkshire, completed in 1827 but demolished in 1832 upon the death of the owner. It had a 16-meter-wide (52 ft) central dome of thin wrought iron ribs and narrow glass panes on a cast iron ring and iron columns. The glass acted as lateral support for the iron ribs.

The Antheum at Brighton would have had the largest span dome in the world in 1833 at 50 meters but the circular cast-iron dome collapsed when the scaffolding was removed. It had been built for horticulturalist Henry Phillips.

Unique glass domes springing straight from ground level were used for hothouses and winter gardens, such as the Palm house at Kew (1844–48) and the Laeken winter garden near Brussels (1875–1876). The Laeken dome spans the central 40 meters of the circular building, resting on a ring of columns. The Kibble Palace of 1865 was re-erected in 1873 in an enlarged form with a 16-meter-wide (52 ft) central dome on columns. The Palm House at Sefton Park in Liverpool has an octagonal central dome, also 16 meters wide and on columns, completed in 1896.

== Libraries ==
A four-layer timbrel dome was built at the public library of Palermo in 1822 by Alessandro Emmanuele Marvuglia, whose father, Giuseppe Venanzio Marvuglia, had also used the technique.

The domed rotunda building of the University of Virginia was designed by Thomas Jefferson and completed in 1836.

The British Museum Library constructed a new reading room in the courtyard of its museum building between 1854 and 1857. The round room, about 42.6 meters in diameter and inspired by the Pantheon, was surmounted by a dome with a ring of windows at the base and an oculus at the top. Hidden iron framing supported a suspended ceiling made of papier-mâché.

For the reading room of Paris's Bibliothèque Impériale, Henri Labrouste proposed in 1858 an iron-supported domed ceiling with a single central source of light similar to the British reading room, but changed the design due to concerns about insufficient light for readers. His completed 1869 design was a grid of nine domes, each with an oculus, supported by 16 thin cast iron columns, four of which were free-standing under the central dome. The domes themselves, supported on iron arches, were covered in white ceramic panels nine millimeters thick.

Inspired by the prestigious British Museum reading room, the first iron dome in Canada was built in the early 1870s over the reading room of the Library of Parliament building in Ottawa. Unlike the British Museum room, the library, which opened in 1876, uses the Gothic style.

The dome of the Thomas Jefferson Building of the Library of Congress, also inspired by the reading room dome at the British Museum, was built between 1889 and 1897 in a classical style. It is 30 metres (100 ft) wide and rises 59 metres (195 ft) above the floor on eight piers. The dome has a relatively low external profile to avoid overshadowing the nearby United States Capitol dome.

The Boston Public Library (1887–1898) includes dome vaulting by Rafael Guastavino.

== Governmental buildings ==
The New Hampshire State House, built from 1816 to 1819, featured a dome crowned by a gilded eagle. When the dome was replaced after an 1864 project to double the size of the building, the eagle was transferred to the new dome.

The design for the United States' national capitol building approved by George Washington included a dome modeled on the Pantheon, with a low exterior elevation. Subsequent design revisions resulted in a double dome, with a raised external profile on an octagonal drum, and construction did not begin until 1822. The interior dome was built of stone and brick except for the upper third, which was made of wood. The exterior dome was wooden and covered with copper sheeting. The dome and building were completed by Charles Bulfinch in 1829.

Most of the 50 state capitol buildings or statehouses with domes in the United States cover a central rotunda, or hall of the people, due to the use of a bicameral legislature. The Pennsylvania capitol building designed by Stephen Hills in Harrisburg was the earliest to combine all the elements that would subsequently become characteristic of state capitol buildings: dome, rotunda, portico, and two legislative chambers. Like the design of the national capitol, the design was chosen through a formal competition. Early domed state capitol buildings include those of North Carolina (as remodeled by William Nichols), Alabama (in Tuscaloosa), Mississippi, Maine (1832), Kentucky, Connecticut (in New Haven), Indiana, North Carolina (as rebuilt), Missouri (very similar to Hills' Harrisburg design), Minnesota (later rebuilt), Texas, and Vermont (1832).

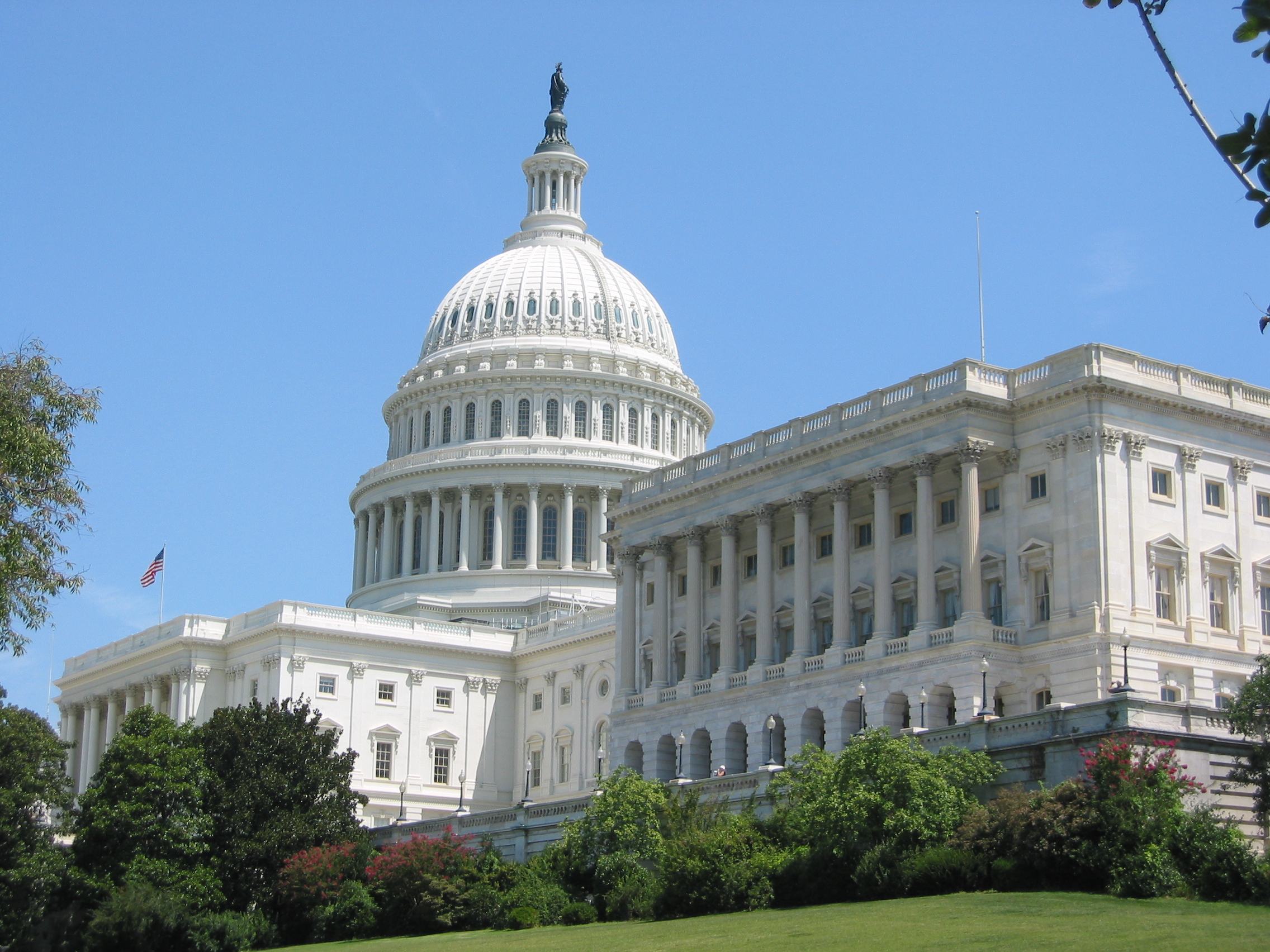
The United States Capitol

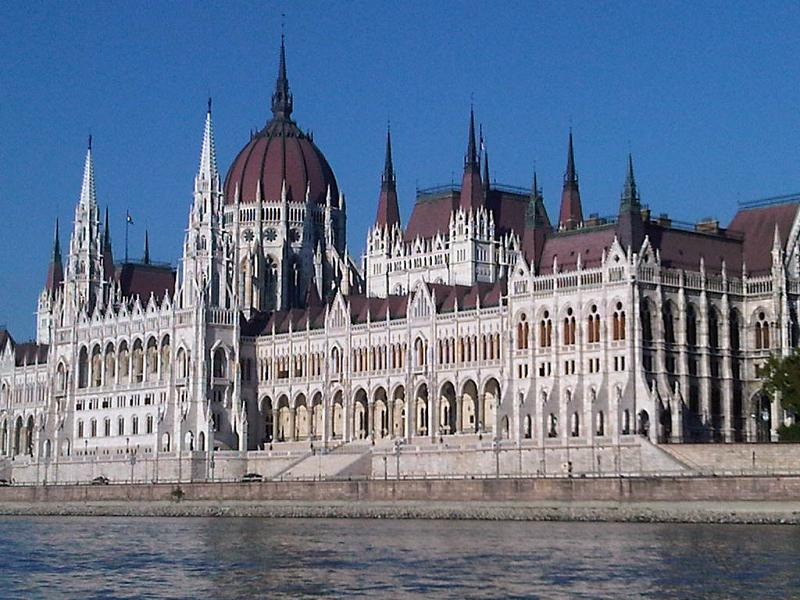
The Hungarian Parliament Building

The current dome over the United States Capitol building, although painted white and crowning a masonry building, is made of cast iron. The dome was built between 1855 and 1866, replacing a lower wooden dome with copper roofing from 1824. It has a 30-meter diameter. It was completed just two years after the Old St. Louis County Courthouse, which has the first cast iron dome built in the United States. The initial design of the capitol dome was influenced by a number of European church domes, particularly St. Paul's in London, St. Peter's in Rome, the Panthéon in Paris, Les Invalides in Paris, and St. Isaac's Cathedral in St. Petersburg. The architect, Thomas U. Walter, designed a double dome interior based on that of the Panthéon in Paris.

Dome construction for state capitol buildings and county courthouses in the United States flourished in the period between the American Civil War and World War I. Most capitols built between 1864 and 1893 were landmarks for their cities and had gilded domes. Examples from the Gilded Age include those of California, Kansas, Connecticut, Colorado, Idaho, Indiana, Iowa, Wyoming, Michigan, Texas, and Georgia. Many American state capitol building domes were built in the late 19th or early 20th century in the American Renaissance style and cover rotundas open to the public as commemorative spaces. Examples include the Indiana State House, Texas State Capitol, and the Wisconsin State Capitol. American Renaissance capitols also include those of Rhode Island and Minnesota.

The Reichstag Palace, built between 1883 and 1893 to house the Parliament of the new German Empire, included a dome made of iron and glass as part of its unusual mixture of Renaissance and Baroque components. Controversially, the 74-meter-tall (243 ft) dome stood seven meters taller than the dome of the Imperial Palace in the city, drawing criticism from Kaiser Wilhelm II. Hermann Zimmermann assisted the architect Paul Wallot in 1889, inventing the spatial framework for the dome over the plenary chamber. It is known as the "Zimmermann dome".

The Hungarian Parliament Building was built in the Gothic style, although most of the 1882 design competition entries used Neo-Renaissance, and it includes a domed central hall. The large, ribbed, egg-shaped dome topped with a spire was influenced by the dome of the Maria vom Siege church in Vienna. It has a sixteen sided outer shell with an iron skeleton that rises 96 meters high, and an inner shell star vault supported on sixteen stone pillars. The Dome Hall is used to display the coronation crown of Hungary and statuary of monarchs and statesmen. The dome was structurally complete by the end of 1895.

== Industrial buildings ==
The "first fully triangulated framed dome" was built in Berlin in 1863 by Johann Wilhelm Schwedler in a gasometer for the Imperial Continental Gas Association and, by the start of the 20th century, similarly triangulated frame domes had become fairly common. Schwedler built three wrought-iron domes over gasholders in Berlin between 1876 and 1882 with spans of 54.9 meters, one of which survives. Six similar Schwedler-type domes were used over gasholders in Leipzig beginning in 1885 and in Vienna using steel, in the 1890s. Rather than using traditional iron ribs, the domes consist of a thinner arrangement of short straight iron bars connected with pin joints in a lattice shell, with cross-bracing provided by light iron rods.

== Tombs ==
The dome of Grant's Tomb in New York City was built by Rafael Guastavino in 1890.

== Bibliography ==
- Alexander, Robert L. (2004). Hayward, Mary Ellen; Shivers, Frank R. Jr. (eds.). The Architecture of Baltimore: An Illustrated History (illustrated ed.). JHU Press. ISBN 978-0-801-87806-0.
- Allen, Edward (2004). "Guastavino, Dieste, and the Two Revolutions in Masonry Vaulting". In Anderson, Stanford (ed.). Eladio Dieste: Innovation in Structural Art (illustrated ed.). Princeton Architectural Press. pp. 66–93. ISBN 978-1-568-98371-4.
- Allen, William C. (2001), Senate Document 106-29: History of the United States Capitol: A Chronicle of Design, Construction, and Politics, U.S. Government Printing Office
- The United States Capitol Dome, Architect of the Capitol
- Bellini, Federico (2017). "8 Vaults and Domes: Statics as an Art". In Mallgrave, Harry Francis; Payne, Alina (eds.). Companion to the History of Architecture, Volume I, Renaissance and Baroque Architecture. John Wiley & Sons, Ltd. pp. 1–33. doi:10.1002/9781118887226.wbcha009. ISBN 978-1-118-88722-6.
- British Museum — Reading Room, British Museum
- Castex, Jean (2008). Architecture of Italy. Reference Guides to National Architecture. Westport, CT: Greenwood Press. ISBN 978-0-313-32086-6.
- Cole, John Young; Reed, Henry Hope (1997). Small, Herbert (ed.). The Library of Congress: the Art and Architecture of the Thomas Jefferson Building (illustrated ed.). W. W. Norton & Company. ISBN 978-0-393-04563-5.
- Coleman, Peter (2006). Shopping Environments (illustrated ed.). Routledge. ISBN 978-0-750-66001-3.
- Condit, Carl W. (1968). American Building: Materials and Techniques from the First Colonial Settlements to the Present (2nd ed.). University of Chicago Press. "first cast iron dome."
- Cowan, Henry J. (1977). "A History of Masonry and Concrete Domes in Building Construction". Building and Environment. 12 (1). Great Britain: Pergamon Press: 1–24. Bibcode:1977BuEnv..12....1C. doi:10.1016/0360-1323(77)90002-6. hdl:2027/mdp.39015041999635.
- Cowan, Henry J. (1983). "Domes: Ancient and Modern". Journal of the Royal Society of Arts. 131 (5320). Royal Society for the Encouragement of Arts, Manufactures and Commerce: 181–198. JSTOR 41373544.
- Dimčić, Miloš (2011). "Structural Optimization of Grid Shells Based on Genetic Algorithms". Forschungsbericht 32 (PDF). Stuttgart: Institut für Tragkonstruktionen und Konstruktives Entwerfen. ISBN 978-3-922302-32-2. Archived from the original (PDF) on 2016-03-31.
- Fatta, Giovanni; Campisi, Tiziana; Vinci, Calogero (2016). "Timbrel vaults in Sicily: analysis of a little-known construction technique". Construction History. 31 (2). The Construction History Society: 107–132. JSTOR 26476238.
- Filemio, Valentina (2009). "Guarini, Juvarra e Antonelli. Segni e Simboli per Torino". In Williams, Kim (ed.). Nexus Network Journal 11,1: Architecture and Mathematics. Springer Science & Business Media. ISBN 978-3-764-38974-1.
- Fraser, Derek (1996). Buildings of Europe: Berlin. Manchester, UK: Manchester University Press. ISBN 0-7190-4022-1.
- Freeman-Grenville, G. S. P. (1987). "The Basilica of the Holy Sepulchre, Jerusalem: History and Future". The Journal of the Royal Asiatic Society of Great Britain and Ireland. 119 (2). Cambridge University Press: 187–207. doi:10.1017/S0035869X00140614. JSTOR 25212148.
- Gayle, Margot; Gayle, Carol (1998). Cast-iron architecture in America: the significance of James Bogardus (illustrated ed.). W. W. Norton & Company. ISBN 978-0-393-73015-9.
- Giustina, Irene (2003), "On the art and the culture of domes. Construction in Milan and Lombardy in the late sixteenth and in the first half of the seventeenth century" (PDF), Proceedings of the First International Congress on Construction History, Madrid, Spain: Sociedad Española de Historia de la Construcción, pp. 1033–1042
- Goodsell, Charles T. (1993). "Political Meanings of the American State Capitol". Journal of Architectural and Planning Research. 10 (4). Locke Science Publishing Company, Inc.: 294–307. JSTOR 43029096.
- Hitchcock, Henry-Russell (1987). Architecture: Nineteenth and Twentieth Centuries. Yale University Press. ISBN 978-0-300-05320-3.
- Hourihane, Colum, ed. (2012). The Grove Encyclopedia of Medieval Art and Architecture. Oxford University Press. ISBN 978-0-19-539536-5.
- Huerta, Santigo (2001). "Mechanics of masonry vaults: The equilibrium approach" (PDF). In Lourenço, Paulo B.; Roca, Pere (eds.). Historical Constructions 2001: possibilities of numerical and experimental techniques: proceedings of the 3rd International Seminar. Guimarães: University of Minho. pp. 47–69. ISBN 972-8692-01-3.
- Huerta, Santiago (2008). "The analysis of masonry architecture: A historical approach: To the memory of professor Henry J. Cowan" (PDF). Architectural Science Review. 51 (4). University of Sydney: 297–328. doi:10.3763/asre.2008.5136.
- King, Julia (2000), "The American Dome: Symbol of Democracy", Domes. Papers Read at the Annual Symposium of the Society of Architectural Historians of Great Britain., Society of Architectural Historians of Great Britain, pp. 83–98, archived from the original on 2021-09-04
- Kohlmaier, Georg; Von Sartory, Barna (1991). Houses of Glass: a Nineteenth-Century Building Type. Translated by John C. Harvey (illustrated ed.). MIT Press. ISBN 978-0-262-61070-4.
- Krasny, Piotr (2003). "Architecture of the Ruthenian Greek Catholic Church in the Habsburg Monarchy ca. 1770-1914" (PDF). Centropa. A Journal of Central European Architecture and Related Arts. 3 (3): 194–207.
- Kurrer, Karl-Eugen (2012). The History of the Theory of Structures: From Arch Analysis to Computational Mechanics. John Wiley & Sons. p. 848. ISBN 978-3-433-60134-1.
- St. Martin's Cathedral — 1000 years of city history, Landeshauptstadt Mainz, 2013
- Le Cœur, Marc (2012). "The Bibliothèque Nationale: Between Rationalism and Illusionism". In Bélier, Corinne; Bergdoll, Barry; Le Cœur, Marc (eds.). Henri Labrouste: Structure Brought to Light. Museum of Modern Art. ISBN 978-0-870-70839-8. LCCN 2012953335.
- Lippincott, Kristen (2008). DK Eyewitness Books: Astronomy. Penguin. ISBN 978-0-756-64349-2.
- Mainstone, Rowland J. (2001). Developments in Structural Form (2nd ed.). Architectural Press. ISBN 978-0-7506-5451-7.
- Mark, Robert (March–April 1987). "Reinterpreting Ancient Roman Structure". American Scientist. 75 (2). Sigma Xi, The Scientific Research Honor Society: 142–150. Bibcode:1987AmSci..75..142M. JSTOR 27854535.
- Miller, Judith; Clinch, Tim (1998). Classic Style (illustrated ed.). Simon and Schuster. ISBN 978-0-684-84997-3.
- Mitchell, James H. (1985). "The Noble Dome". The Antioch Review. 43 (3). Antioch Review, Inc.: 261–271. doi:10.2307/4611482. JSTOR 4611482.
- Moravánszky, Ákos (1998). Competing Visions: Aesthetic Invention and Social Imagination in Central European Architecture, 1867–1918 (illustrated ed.). MIT Press. ISBN 978-0-262-13334-0.
- Pavani, Raffaella (2020). "Chapter 28 Challenging Mathematical Insights into Masonry Domes Over the Centuries". In Abali, Bilen Emek; Giorgio, Ivan (eds.). Vol 130 Developments and Novel Approaches in Nonlinear Solid Body Mechanics. Advanced Structured Materials. Vol. 130. Springer. pp. 469–479. doi:10.1007/978-3-030-50460-1_28. ISBN 978-3-030-50460-1.
- Perkin, George, ed. (1981). "Jerusalem Dome". Concrete Quarterly. July–Sept (130). Cement and Concrete Association: 10–11.
- Pevsner, Nikolaus (1978). Derbyshire. Revised by Elizabeth Williamson (illustrated, reprint ed.). Yale University Press. ISBN 978-0-140-71008-3.
- Richardson, Albert E. (2001). Monumental Classic Architecture in Great Britain and Ireland. Dover Publications. p. 123. ISBN 978-0-486-41534-5.
- Rizzoni, Giovanni (2009). "The Form of Parliaments & European Identity". In Rorato, Laura; Saunders, Anna (eds.). The Essence and the Margin: National Identities and Collective Memories in Contemporary European Culture. The Netherlands: Rodopi. pp. 183–198. ISBN 978-9-042-02571-4.
- Scheunemann, Juergen; Omilanowska, Malgorzata (2012). DK Eyewitness Travel Guide: Berlin. Penguin. ISBN 978-0-756-69114-1.
- Rehm, Jörg (2018). "The first concrete dome in Germany? A church building using modern techniques". In Wouters, Ine; Voorde, Stephanie; Bertels, Inge; Espion, Bernard; Jonge, Krista; Zastavni, Denis (eds.). Building Knowledge, Constructing Histories: Proceedings of the 6th International Congress on Construction History (6ICCH 2018), July 9–13, 2018, Brussels, Belgium. CRC Press. ISBN 978-0-429-01362-1.
- Schreurs, Eireen (2021). "Transformative dialogues: on material knowing in architecture". In Schrijver, Lara (ed.). The tacit dimension: architecture knowledge and scientific research. Leuven University Press. pp. 55–67. doi:10.1353/book.83868. hdl:10067/1822540151162165141. ISBN 978-94-6166-380-1.
- Seale, William (1975). "Symbol as Architecture". Design Quarterly (94/95). Walker Art Center: 14–15. doi:10.2307/4090872. JSTOR 4090872.
- Shearer, Benjamin F.; Shearer, Barbara S. (2001). State Names, Seals, Flags, and Symbols: A Historical Guide. Bloomsbury Publishing. ISBN 978-0-313-09236-7.
- Silk, Michael; Gildenhard, Ingo; Barrow, Rosemary (2017). The Classical Tradition: Art, Literature, Thought (illustrated ed.). John Wiley & Sons. ISBN 978-1-405-15550-2.
- Skempton, A. W. (2002). A biographical dictionary of civil engineers in Great Britain and Ireland: 1500–1830 (illustrated ed.). Thomas Telford. ISBN 978-0-7277-2939-2.
- Stephenson, Davis; Hammond, Victoria; Davi, Keith F. (2005). Visions of Heaven: the Dome in European Architecture (illustrated ed.). Princeton Architectural Press. ISBN 978-1-56898-549-7.
- Stern, Robert A. M.; Mellins, Thomas; Fishman, David (1995). New York 1960: Architecture and Urbanism Between the Second World War and the Bicentennial (1960 ed.). New York: Monacelli Press. ISBN 1-885254-02-4.
- Sutherland, James (2000), "19th Century Iron and Glass Domes", Domes. Papers Read at the Annual Symposium of the Society of Architectural Historians of Great Britain., Society of Architectural Historians of Great Britain, pp. 111–130
- Tyack, Geoffrey (2015). "A Pantheon for Horses: The Prince Regent's Dome and Stables at Brighton". Architectural History. 58. SAHGB Publications Limited: 141–158. doi:10.1017/S0066622X00002616. JSTOR 26406256.
- Villám, Judit; Szabó, Dániel; Gyarmati, György; Soltész, István; Sisa, József (2006). The Hungarian National Assembly (PDF). Translated by Zsuzsa Boronkay-Roe. Budapest: Office of the National Assembly. ISBN 978-963-87318-5-2.
- Wahid, Julaihi; Karsono, Bambang (2009), "Alternative to Dome as a Symbol of Masjid and It's [sic] Influence in Indonesian Masjid Design" (PDF), Proceedings of 2nd International Seminar on Islamic Thought, Islam and Muslims: Issues and Challenges, 6 – 7 October 2009, Department of Theology and Philosophy, Universiti Kabangsaan Malaysia
- Young, Carolyn Ann (1995). The Glory of Ottawa: Canada's First Parliament Buildings (illustrated ed.). McGill-Queen's Press — MQUP. ISBN 978-0-7735-1227-6.
- Zanon, Paolo; Bursi, Oreste S.; Erlicher, Silvano; Zonta, D.; Clemente, Paolo; Indirli, M. (2001). "Intervention Scenarios on the Basilica of San Gaudenzio Dome in Novara". 7th International Seminar on Seismic Isolation, Passive Energy Dissipation and Active Control of Vibrations of Structures, Assisi, Italy, October 2–5, 2001. Assisi, Italy.
- Zanow, Lois; Johnston, Sally (2010). Monuments to Heaven: Baltimore's Historic Houses of Worship (illustrated ed.). AuthorHouse. ISBN 978-1-452-08537-1.
