= Fichte (disambiguation) =

Fichte often refers to Johann Gottlieb Fichte (1762–1814), German philosopher.

Fichte may also refer to:

- Fichte (surname)
- Fichte-Bunker, a nineteenth-century gasometer in the Kreuzberg district of Berlin
- VfB Fichte Bielefeld, a German football club based in Bielefeld
- 3475 Fichte (1972 TD), a main-belt asteroid discovered in 1972 by L. Kohoutek, named after Hubert Fichte
