= Senate Reserve =

West Berlin's blockade stockpile, 1949-1990

The Senate Reserve (German: Senatsreserve) was a stockpile of food and other necessities which the Senate of West Berlin was required to maintain in case of another Berlin Blockade. It was dissolved after German reunification.

== History ==
After the Berlin Blockade of 1948/49 and the Berlin Airlift to keep the inhabitants of the western sector supplied, the three Western Allied commanders-in-chief required the Senate of Berlin, which governed under their authority, to establish stockpiles of staple foodstuffs, medication, coal, fuel, industrial raw materials and other daily necessities. The intent was that in case of another blockade, "normal" life could be maintained in West Berlin for at least 180 days, that is, six months, and thus a blockade would no longer make sense. (There was also a West German national foodstuffs reserve, the Bundesreserve, of which a large part was stored in West Berlin, and periodic attempts to encourage the West German populace in general to participate in Aktion Eichhörnchen, "Operation Squirrel", and maintain a stock of necessities. However, these were generally unsuccessful and the term was used mockingly of the Senate Reserve.)

In 1953 it was decided to enlarge the reserve; Eleanor Lansing Dulles came to the city to assist in this and witnessed the disturbances of 16/17 June 1953.

The Senate Reserve stored approximately 4 million tonnes of goods for decades. There were at one stage more than 700 storage facilities in West Berlin, comprising 624,000 square metres of open land and 423,000 square metres of inside storage; most of them were secret, and very few people possessed detailed knowledge of the reserves.

After the Berlin Wall fell and the Cold War ended in 1989, the Senate Reserve was dissolved. Berlin was legally required to obtain the highest possible value for the goods should the reserve be partially or wholly eliminated. However, at the suggestion of the mayor, 90,000 tonnes of foodstuffs, medications and other goods were donated free of charge to the Soviet Union as humanitarian aid.

== Contents ==
The value of the stored goods was approximately 2,000 million DM in the early 1980s, approximately 1,600 million DM when the Senate Reserves were liquidated in 1990. The regular "rotation" in which goods were replaced with fresh supplies cost several million DM annually. The government of the Federal Republic defrayed the high costs of the goods and the turnover.

Old stock which had been replaced was sold at low prices to the population by the Berlin Senate. Cookery books sometimes referred to ingredients, such as tinned beef, as 'Senate Reserve'.

There were continual problems with obsolescence and changing standards, substandard supplies, and pilferage.

The roughly 1,000 items included in the Senate Reserve, for a population of 2 million West Berliners and detailed in a 16-page list, included:

- 189,000 tonnes of grains (or flour)
- 44,000 tonnes of meat
- 19 live cattle
- 7,130 tonnes of salt
- 11,800 tonnes of cooking fat
- 96 tonnes of mustard
- 291,000 pairs of children's and teenagers' shoes
- 380 tonnes of rubber soles and heels for shoe repair
- 20.9 tonnes of glue
- 18 million rolls of toilet paper
- 10,000 chamberpots
- 35 million plastic cups
- 4 million lightbulbs
- 5,000 bicycles
- 25.8 million cigars
- 1,000 tonnes of animal fodder (oats)

The reserve was to supply a diet of 2,900 calories daily to each normal citizen; during the blockade it had been 1,800.

After the Four-Powers Agreement of 1971, amounts of some items were reduced and the consumer items such as bicycles, clothes and shoes were sold.

== Ration cards and coupons ==
To enable orderly distribution of goods to the populace in an emergency, the Bundesdruckerei (state printing house), which is headquartered in Berlin-Kreuzberg, printed ration cards and coupons:

- Up to 1 year of age: Infant Card, Milk Card A, Special Supplies Card, Soap Card
- 1–3 years of age: Child Card, Potato Card 200, Milk Card B, Special Supplies Card, Soap Card
- 4–5 years of age: Child Card, Supplementary Card C, Potato Card 200, Milk Card B, Special Supplies Card, Soap Card
- 6–8 years of age: Child Card, Supplementary Card D, Potato Card 300, Special Supplies Card, Soap Card
- 9–13 years of age: Basic Card, Supplementary Card B, Potato Card 500, Special Supplies Card, Soap Card
- 14–19 years of age, female: Basic Card, Supplementary Card B, Potato Card 500, Special Supplies Card, Soap Card
- 14–19 years of age, male: Basic Card, Supplementary Card A, Potato Card 500, Special Supplies Card, Soap Card
- 20 years of age and above: Basic Card, Potato Card 500, Special Supplies Card, Soap Card
- Adults and young people 16 years of age and above: Smoker Card
- Adults and young people 18 years of age and above: Supply Card A
- Children, young people and adults: postage coupons for parcels (12 parcel postage stamps)

== Storage ==
Storage locations for the Senate Reserve included:

- Glass warehouse in Alte Jakobstraße, completed in 1968, today the Berlinische Galerie
- Eiswerder Island in the Havel: items including dried onions and clothing
- Former annexe of Sachsenhausen concentration camp in Berlin-Lichterfelde: construction materials
- The Fichte-Bunker, a gasometer which had been converted into an air raid shelter - until 1990
- The so-called Speerplatte, a large concrete area constructed as parking for the Albert Speer division of the National Socialist Motor Corps in Charlottenburg-Nord: coal
- A 1937 industrial building in Berlin-Reinickendorf, originally part of the Borsig complex: coffee, sugar, wheat, on occasions coal
- Former festival hall in Lübars Old Village (today the LabSaal): fertiliser (potash)
- Warehouse at Tempelhof Airport
- Former bunker at Anhalter Station
- Warehouse at the Westhafen harbour in Mitte
- Warehouse at 'Victoria Mill Works' in Cuvrystraße
- Disused railway yard in Spandau: anthracite (moved to Kladow in summer 1989)
- Former brewery in Neukölln (today Werkstatt der Kulturen): toilet paper, etc.
- Wasteland on Töpchiner Weg (now Gerlinger Straße) in Buckow (Neukölln): anthracite
