= Johann Wilhelm Schwedler =

German civil engineer and civil servant

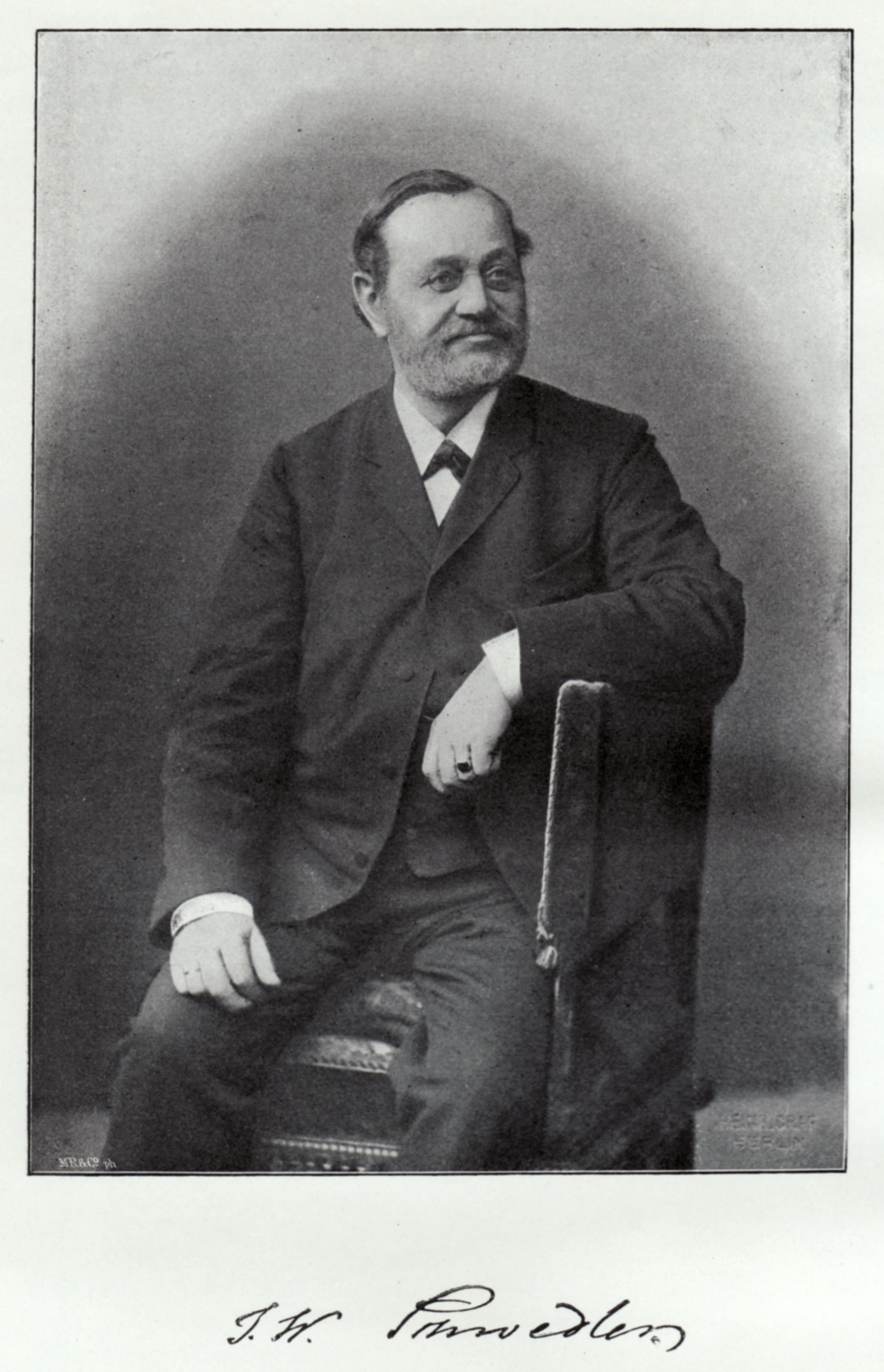
Johann Wilhelm Schwedler; from Zeitschrift für Bauwesen, 1895 (the year after his death)

Johann Wilhelm Schwedler (23 June 1823, Berlin – 9 June 1894, Berlin) was a German civil engineer and civil servant who designed many bridges and public buildings and invented the Schwedler truss and the Schwedler cupola. He is an author of Schwedler's theorem, a formula defining relation between shear force and bending moment.

== Life and career ==
Schwedler was the son of a cabinetmaker who died when he was still in school; his brother, already a construction supervisor, made it possible for him to finish his education at the City Trade School in 1842. After a further required examination in Latin to complete the equivalent of a lower-level Gymnasium education, he spent the next ten years training as a surveyor, studying for examinations in that and in road construction, studying for a year at the Berlin Academy of Construction, and completing the examinations to be a certified building inspector and construction supervisor. One of his practical examinations was waived after he won the international competition to design a road and rail bridge across the Rhine between Cologne and Deutz. He was then required to leave on his Wanderjahre as a wandering journeyman; he did so with his new wife, the daughter of a teacher and organist in Buckow, whom he had met through their shared love of music and become engaged to six years before.

Schwedler began publishing in engineering before he completed his training, beginning with Über die statischen Prinzipien der Konstruktion eiserner Dachgebinde über weite Räume und die Entwicklung der Konstruktionssysteme aus demselben (1846). His "Theorie der Brückenbalkensysteme", published in the first year of the Zeitschrift für Bauwesen (1851), had a revolutionary impact on the construction of steel bridges. But during his journeyman years he did not publish, concentrating instead on building. The City of Cologne employed him to build a stone bridge over the Sieg. He then supervised the first stage of construction of the railway between Cologne and Gießen. In 1848, Barmen, now part of Wuppertal, invited him to become its superintendent of construction, but he instead with some reluctance returned to Berlin to take a post in the Division of Construction of the Prussian Ministry of Trade.

He spent the remainder of his career as a civil servant, becoming chief engineer for the Royal Prussian Railways and during a period of rapid expansion: between 1860 and 1890 the Prussian railway system grew from less than 5,800 km of rails to more than 26,300 km, from approximately 600 stations to 4,200, and numerous rivers and valleys were bridged for both railways and roads. During that time he oversaw in some manner every major piece of construction in Prussia and subsequently the German Empire. In 1868 he was promoted to Geheimer Baurat and became the highest ranking construction employee in the Prussian Civil Service. He also returned to publishing, developing with Friedrich August von Pauli, Johann Caspar Harkort, and Heinrich Gerber a complete theory and praxis of steel construction; his Theorie der Brückenbalken-Systeme, volume 1 (1862) and Resultate über die Konstruktion der eisernen Brücken (1865) were particularly influential. Shortly after his return to Berlin, he became an instructor at the Academy of Construction, and after 1864 he was an examiner there; his teaching greatly improved the training in the field. He was on the editorial board of the Zeitschrift für Bauwesen for many years.

Schwedler had three daughters and a son; however, his youngest daughter and his son died in 1863 and 1864, and his wife in 1867 after a long decline. He remarried, but his second wife died in 1892. In 1891, he had had to retire because of poor health; 3,500 fellow engineers signed a farewell testament praising his accomplishments. He died in 1894 after being housebound for several years.

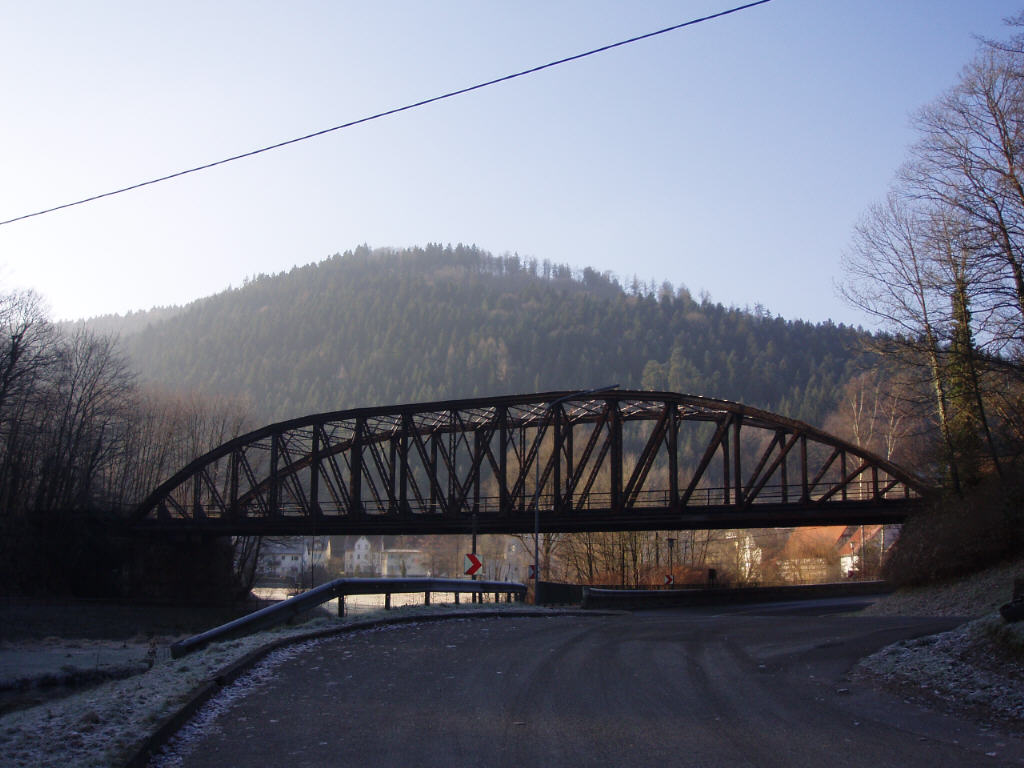
Bridge at Unterreichenbach on the Nagold Valley Railway, one of the last remaining Schwedler truss bridges

== Works ==
Among Schwedler's memorable engineering feats were the design of a swinging bridge which was still in use half a century later; the design for the new prayer hall of the Deutscher Dom; and a simple solution to the problem of raising the cast iron Prussian National Monument for the Liberation Wars on the Kreuzberg hill in Berlin while turning it 21°.

=== Schwedler truss ===
Schwedler invented the Schwedler truss, which was widely used worldwide in framed bridges and roofs until about 1900. It is a kind of curved chord or bowstring truss with the minimum number of diagonals, which are to bear only tension, not compression; it requires a slight downward curvature in the middle, usually replaced with extra diagonal bracing for appearance and cost saving. Schwedler himself would have preferred it to be used less on aesthetic grounds. His first use of the innovation was for the railway bridge over the Weser at Corvey, on the edge of Höxter (1864), for which he won a gold medal at the 1867 Paris International Exposition. One of the last remaining examples is the bridge carrying the Nagold Valley Railway over the Nagold in Unterreichenbach.

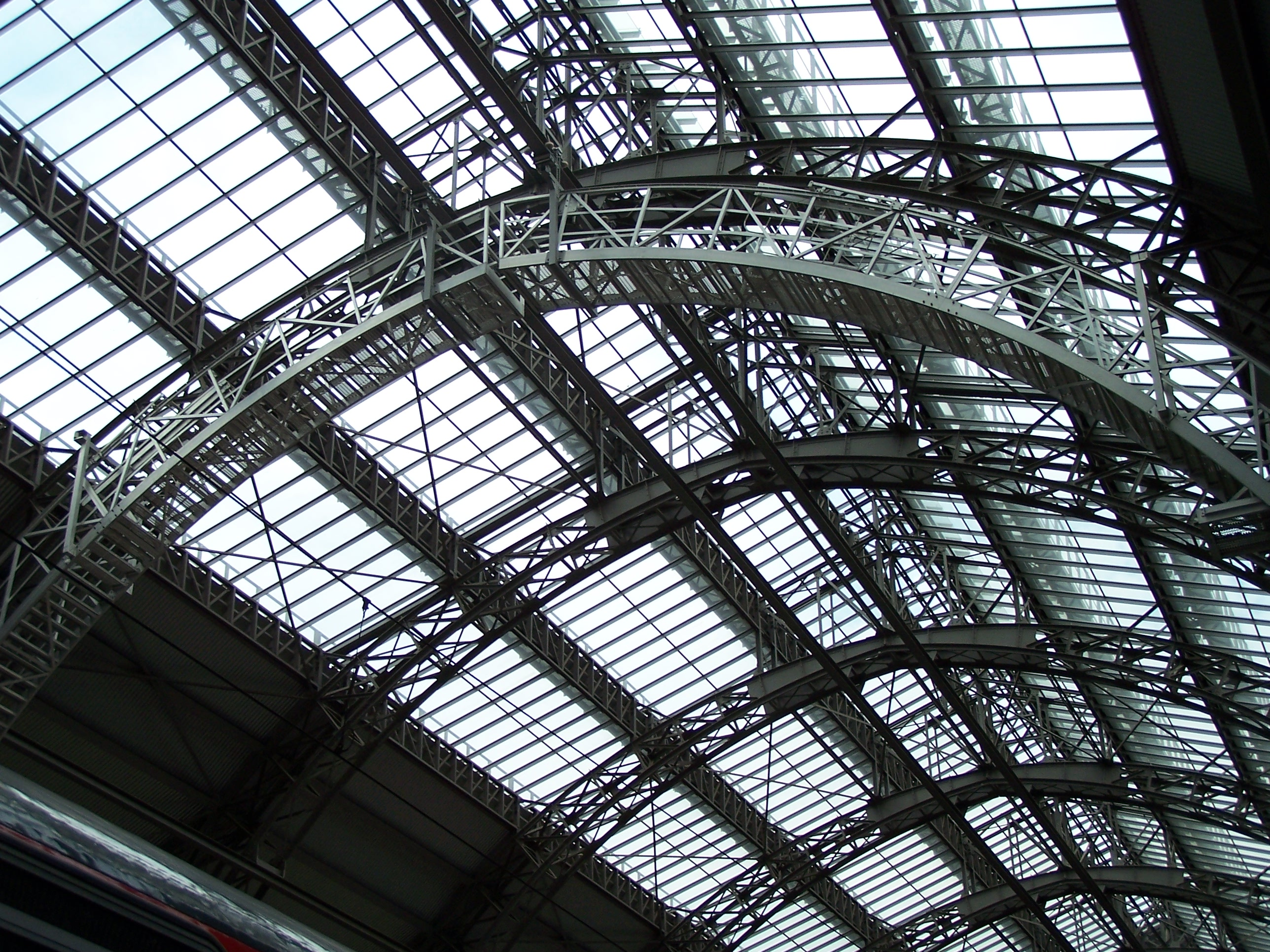
Southern train shed, Frankfurt (Main) Hauptbahnhof

=== Triple-hinged arch ===
Schwedler's work with bridges and calculating the stresses on them led to a further innovation, an arched structure hinged at three points to accommodate differing stresses and changes in temperature, which functionally resembles the roofs of modern stadia. The first of these, and a prototype for the platform halls of late 19th-century stations, was his train shed for the Berlin Ostbahnhof, then known as the Schlesischer Bahnhof (1866); the last surviving example is probably the train sheds of the main station in Frankfurt am Main (1885–87).

=== Schwedler cupola ===
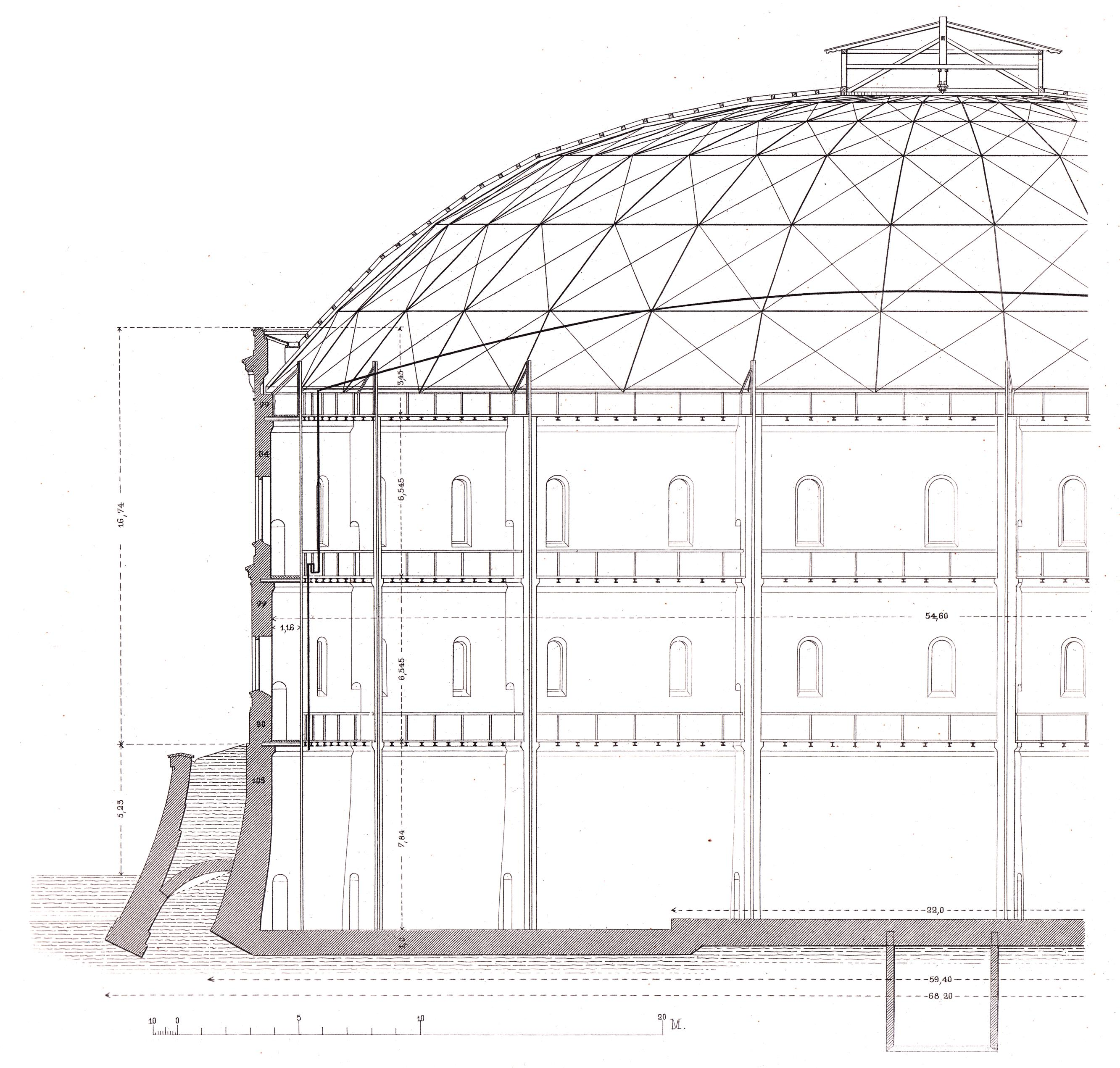
Section, gas holder in Fichtestraße, Berlin, published 1876

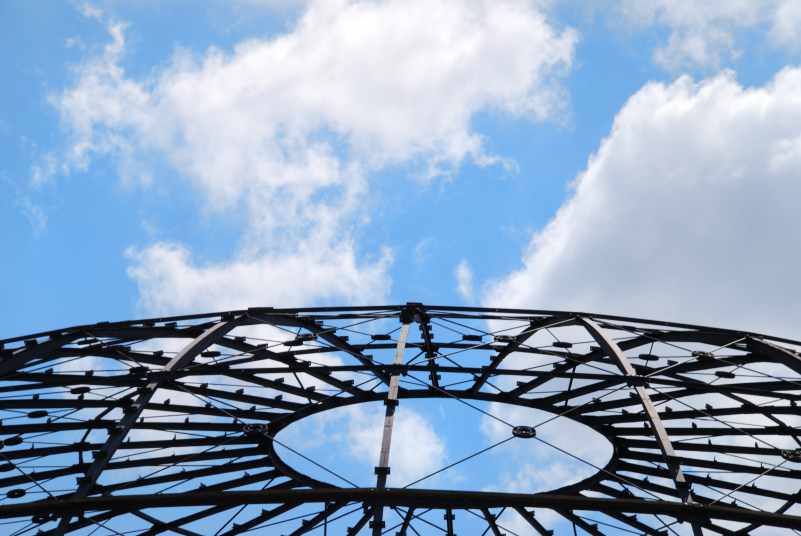
Schwedler cupola on the gas holder

Called in by the Imperial Continental Gas Association in 1863 to replace a failed roof over a telescoping gas holder, Schwedler devised a workable solution but thinking further about the problem, in 1866 published an article describing a new type of iron cupola that was simpler, lighter, and as sturdy: it takes the form of an unsupported spheroidal steel vault, rather than beams, and was normally used to span distances of 25–45 m. He used Schwedler cupolas in designing four new gas holders for Berlin's street lighting, of which the one now known as the Fichte-Bunker (1874) survives, and the only deterrent to their use today is the cost of labour. He designed the cupolas on Berlin's New Synagogue (1863) and the Sedan Panorama at Alexanderplatz Station.

== Honours ==
The Schwedlerstraße in the Grunewald neighbourhood of Berlin was named for him in 1898; the Schwedlerbrücke, a pedestrian bridge across the railway in the Ostend neighbourhood of Frankfurt, and the Schwedlerstraße leading to it are also named for him.

He was also awarded the following honours in his lifetime:

- Order of the Red Eagle 2nd Class with oakleaf
- Gold medal for services in construction (1884)
- Commander 2nd Class of the Hessian Order of Philip the Magnanimous
- Commander of the Imperial Austrian Order of Franz Joseph
- Officer of the Order of the Crown of Italy

== Sources ==
- Egbert Ritter von Hoyer, "Schwedler, Johann Wilhelm". Allgemeine Deutsche Biographie Volume 54. Leipzig: Duncker & Humblot, 1908. pp. 278–282. (on de.wikisource) (in German)
