= Fichte-Bunker =

Historical gasometer in Berlin

Coordinates: 52°29′25″N 13°24′45″E

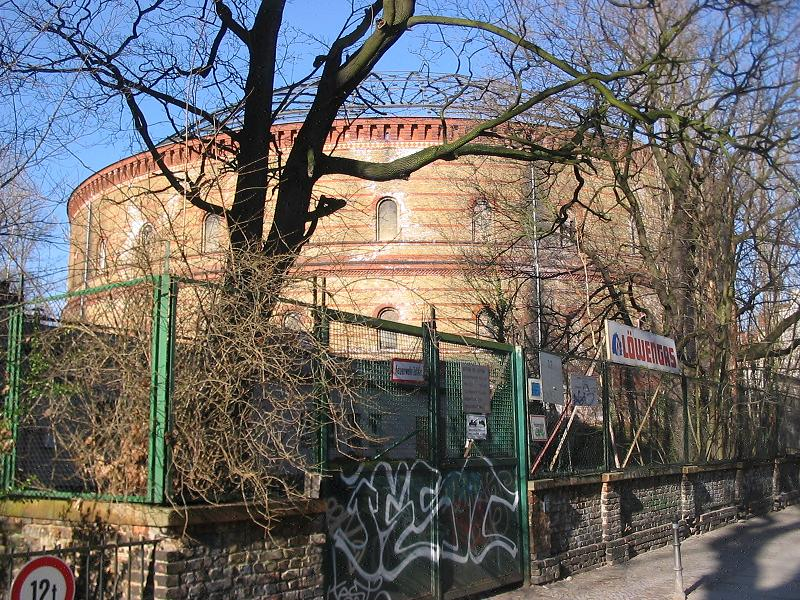
The Fichte-Bunker, on Fichtestraße in Kreuzberg, Berlin

The Fichte-Bunker is a nineteenth-century gasometer in the Kreuzberg district of Berlin, Germany that was made into an air-raid shelter in World War II and subsequently was used as a shelter for the homeless and for refugees, in particular for those fleeing East Berlin for the West. It is the last remaining brick gasometer in Berlin.

The Fichte-Bunker is located between Fichtestraße and Körtestraße in an area of Jugendstil apartment houses, many of which are now under historic protection. The gasometer itself is protected, but in September 2006 the State of Berlin's Real Property Fund sold it to private investors and residences have now been constructed on the roof.

== Construction and technical data ==
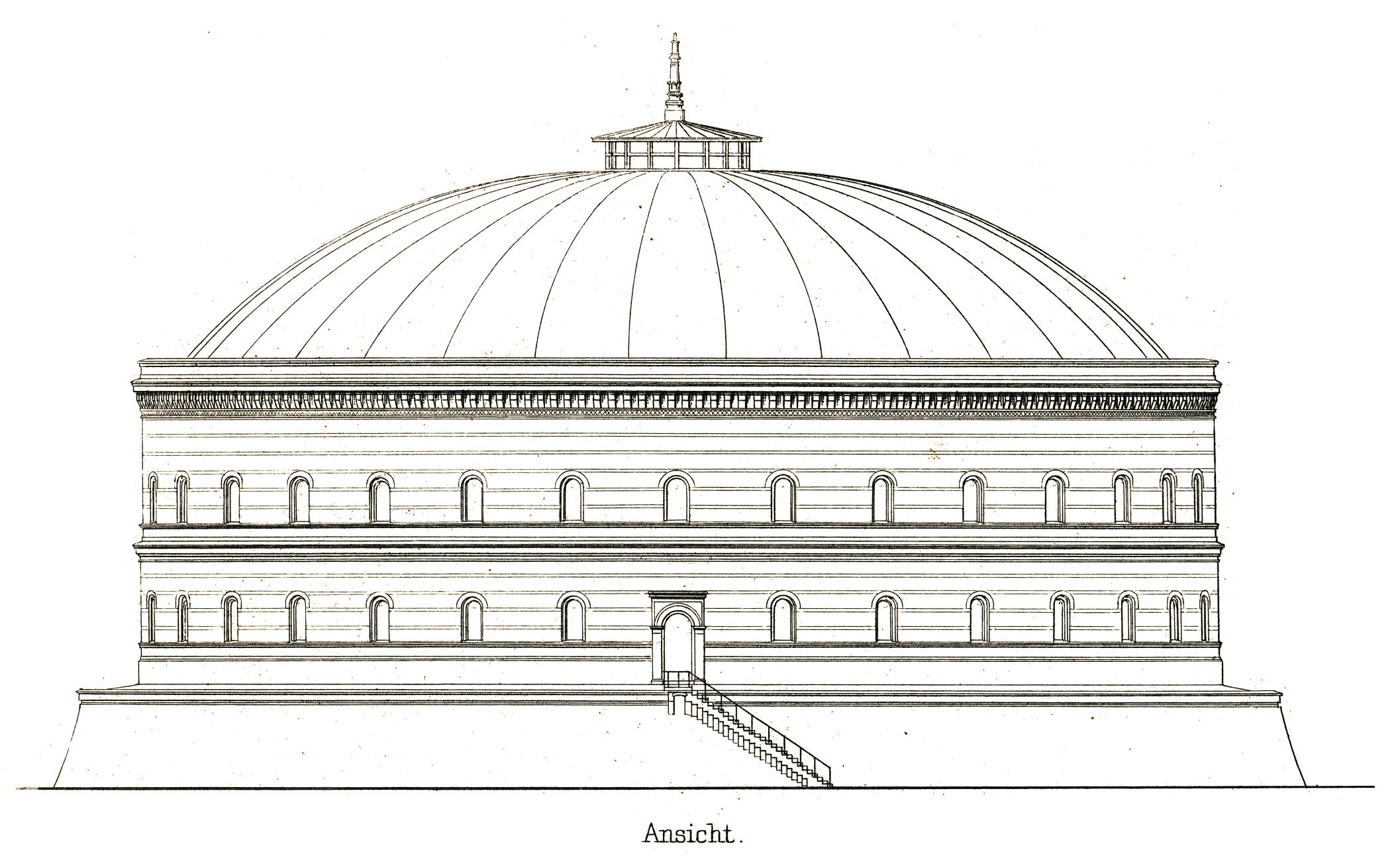
Fichte-Bunker elevation, published 1876

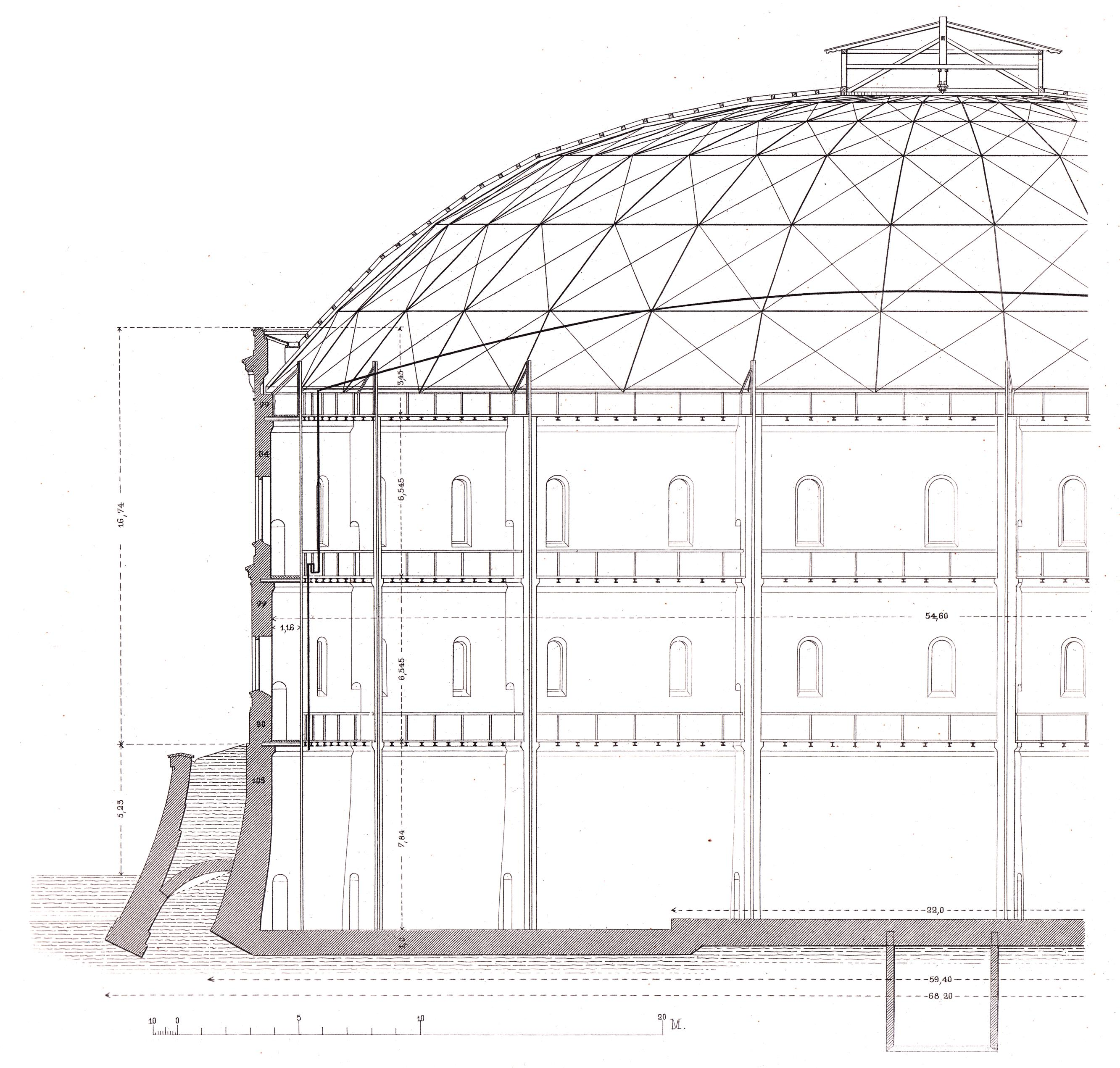
Fichte-Bunker section, published 1876

The Fichte-Bunker was constructed in 1874 for the Municipal Gasholder Authority to the design of Johann Wilhelm Schwedler. It was the second of four gasometers he designed for Berlin's street lighting; the first was in Friedrichshain and has since been destroyed. Both were topped with the "Schwedler cupola", an engineering innovation of his that used an unsupported curved steel vault to span diameters of up to 45 metres (148 ft).

The gasometer is a cylinder 56 metres (184 ft) in diameter, 21 metres (69 ft) high exclusive of the cupola and 27 metres (89 ft) high in total. Its form was based on an 1827 design by Karl Friedrich Schinkel for a circular church. The capacity of the telescoping gas container was 30,000 cubic metres.

== History ==
The Kreuzberg gasometer was one of four built to supply gas for street lighting during Berlin's explosive growth in the 1870s.

After the introduction of electric street lighting, the gasometer was taken out of service in 1922 and until 1940 stood empty. At the end of 1940, Fritz Todt, Inspector-General of Buildings for the capital, had it converted into a 6-level air-raid shelter, one of three intended primarily for the protection of women and children. (The other two were side by side in Wedding). These were the largest shelters built anywhere in the Reich in the crash programme of shelter construction. The roof, interior walls and floors were constructed of reinforced concrete up to 3 metres (9.8 ft) thick. The contractors, Siemens-Bauunion, used predominantly prisoners-of-war and forced labourers. Originally the shelter was planned for 6,000 people, but during the air raid of 3 February 1945, some 30,000 people took shelter in the approximately 750 individual rooms, which are in many cases only 5 to 7 square meters. In 1944-45, it sheltered Germans expelled from the eastern territories as well as Berliners. Despite heavy bombardment, the bunker survived the war more or less undamaged.

After the war, the Fichte-Bunker was initially a much needed place of refuge for the displaced. It was used as a juvenile detention facility and as a home for the elderly. It was also typically the first place where refugees from East Germany stayed. Finally it became a homeless shelter, which rented rooms to the needy for 2.50 DM a night. Conditions were notoriously bad; it was called the Bunker der Hoffnungslosen ("Bunker of the Hopeless") and a reporter who went in incognito found it unbearable.

The facility was closed for health reasons in 1963 and from then until reunification, the city used the building as a storehouse for part of the Senate Reserve, goods and provisions which the Senate of West Berlin was legally required to maintain in case of a second Berlin Blockade.

After 1990, the Fichte-Bunker again stood empty; entrance was only possible on special tours.

== Luxury housing ==
In September 2006, the State of Berlin's Real Property Fund sold the building and approximately 8,000m^{2} of land to the newly formed development company SpeicherWerk Wohnbau GmbH. The investors planned to construct luxury 2-storey condominiums on top of the former gasometer and build townhouses and a five-storey apartment building on the land around the building. Despite objections from neighbours to the density of the development, planning permission was granted and work began in December 2007; the freestanding residences were completed in 2009. In spring 2008, there was concern about possible violation of the historic building code, and in summer 2009 the scaffolding around the gasometer was set on fire as part of Action Weeks by squatters and opponents of demolition of housing to build for the rich. In spring 2010, completion of the "Circlehouse" of 13 condominiums on top of the bunker was announced. Designed by architect Paul Ingenbleek and engineer Michael Ernst, they have rooftop gardens in front of the lower storey and front walls of steel and glass and are reached by means of a bridge from a tower which contains a lift and stairs.
