= Flight 315 =

Flight 315 may refer to:

- Maritime Central Airways Flight 315, crashed on 11 August 1957
- Aeroflot Flight 315 (1959), crashed on 16 November 1959
- Aeroflot Flight 315 (1960), crashed on 26 February 1960
