= Aeroflot Flight 315 =

Aeroflot Flight 10 may refer to:

- Aeroflot Flight 315 (1959), crashed on final approach near Lviv Airport on 16 November 1959
- Aeroflot Flight 315 (1960), crashed on final approach near Lviv Airport on 26 February 1960
