= IL-20 =

IL-20 or IL 20 may refer to:

- Interleukin 20, a protein in humans
- Illinois's 20th congressional district, an obsolete district
- Illinois Route 20
- Ilyushin Il-20 (1948), a prototype Soviet ground attack aircraft
- Ilyushin Il-20M, a military variant of the Soviet-era Il-18 turboprop aircraft
