= Aeroflot Flight 1491 =

1972 Antonov An-10 crash

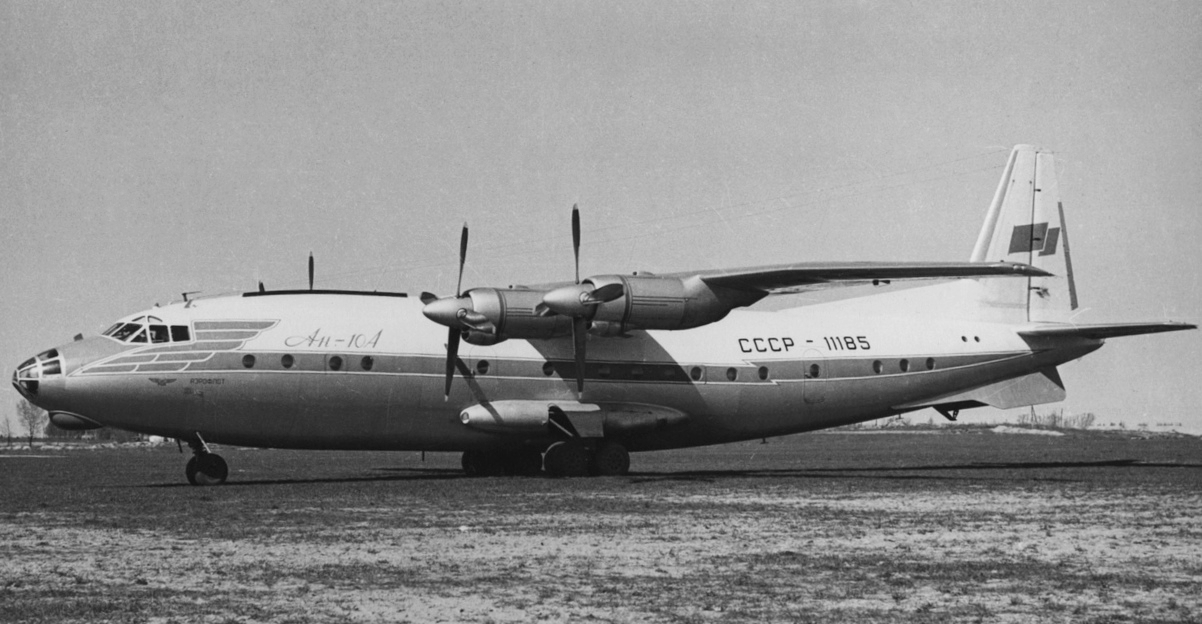
- An Aeroflot Antonov An-10 similar to the accident aircraft

Accident
- Date: 18 May 1972
- Summary: Structural failure, mid-air breakup
- Site: Near Kharkiv Airport, Kharkiv, Ukrainian SSR; 49°54′56″N 36°39′02″E

Aircraft
- Aircraft type: Antonov An-10A
- Operator: Aeroflot (Ukrainian UGA, Kharkiv JSC)
- Registration: CCCP-11215
- Flight origin: Vnukovo Airport, Moscow
- Destination: Kharkiv Airport, Kharkiv
- Occupants: 122
- Passengers: 114
- Crew: 8
- Fatalities: 122
- Survivors: 0

Aeroflot Flight 1491 was a scheduled domestic passenger flight from Moscow-Vnukovo Airport to Kharkiv Airport in the USSR that crashed on 18 May 1972 while descending to land in Kharkiv, killing all 122 passengers and crew (Note: The death toll was also claimed to be 108.) aboard the Antonov An-10.

== Aircraft and crew ==
=== Aircraft ===
The Antonov An-10A, registration CCCP-11215, was manufactured at the Voronezh Aviation Plant on 3 February 1961. On 7 February 1961 it was delivered to Aeroflot's Kharkiv division. At the time of the accident, the aircraft accumulated 11,105 flight cycles and 15,483 flying hours.

=== Crew and passengers ===
The flight crew responsible flying the aircraft was from the 87th Flight Squad (Kharkiv United Squadron). Captain Vladimir Vasiltsov was in charge of this flight; first officer Andrei Burkovskii, navigator Aleksandr Grishko, flight engineer Vladimir Shchokin, and radio operator Konstantin Peresechanskii were also in the flight deck.

Among the 115 passengers were:

- Viktor Chistyakov, pop artist and parodist
- Nina Aleksandrova, journalist for Izvestia
- Boris Ryshkovsky, husband of actress Victoria Lepko
- Vladimir Zaimov, Bulgarian mathematician
- Mokichev Konstantin Andreevich, lawyer, Doctor of Law, First Deputy Prosecutor General of the USSR (in 1949-1952, Rector of the All-Union Correspondence Law Institute (VYuZI)
- A delegation of GDR pioneers

Also on board was the escort of the Ministry of Internal Affairs, Ivan Medvedyuk.

== Synopsis ==
Flight 1491 took off from Moscow-Vnukovo Airport at 10:39 for Kharkiv. The flight took place in clear, good weather. At 11:44, on approach to Kharkiv, ATC instructed the crew to descend to 1,500 m (4,900 ft). This was the last communication with the aircraft. At 11:51, ATC contacted the crew, but there was no response. At 11:53, the aircraft disappeared from radar screens.

During the descent from 4,500 m (14,800 ft) to 1,500 m (4,900 ft), while flying at 1,700 m (5,600 ft), the aircraft broke apart and crashed. The wreckage was found 24 km (15 mi) from Kharkiv Airport, in the Olkhovaya Balka forest; an engine and a wing were found some distance from the fuselage, which was found between Borshchevaya and Russkaya Lozovaya in the Dergachevsky district of the Kharkov region. None of the 122 on board survived.

The first person at the crash site was a forester who stated that there was nothing left of the occupants, the bodies were fragmented. Only the body of a baby was found intact.

A commission was set up to investigate the crash, and member Friedlander recalled what experts saw at the scene:

...Here are the fragments of the lower wing panel, which is stretched in flight and therefore is the most vulnerable part of the structure. There is also a piece of the center section, and fragments of stringers stick out like broken ribs of a dinosaur skeleton. The fractures are smeared and blackened...

I.P. Zhegina, a fracture specialist, comes up to me and shows me pieces of stringers. She cleaned them as best she could, and fatigue cracks became visible... Later we find five more stringers, and all of them have cracks in the form of fatigue pads...

== Investigation ==
During the commission's work to investigate the cause of the crash, it was established that the cause was the failure of the wing center section in mid-air due to a failure in the lower panel of the center section, caused by fatigue cracks in the stringers and skin.

According to the commission's conclusion, the emergency situation on board arose a minute before the aircraft broke up. The crack, which began in the fatigue zone between the 6th and 7th stringers of the lower panel of the center section, grew in both directions and moved towards the spars. At that moment, the zero rib, which connected the stringers to the riveted panel, failed. As a result, both wings folded upward.

From the conclusion:

Engine number one was the first to separate from the left wing.

Approximately two seconds later, engine number four separated from the right wing. - Approximately three seconds after engine one separated from the fuselage, the left wing separated from the fuselage. - The right wing separated from the fuselage last, approximately four seconds after the start of visible destruction (separation of engine one).

The total duration of visible damage was 4 seconds. The distance from the start of the fall to the impact point was 3,400 meters. The An-10A aircraft, tail number CCCP-11215, factory number 0402502, was manufactured by the Voronezh Aviation Plant on February 3, 1961. By the time of the accident, it had flown 15,435 hours, made 11,106 landings, and undergone three factory repairs, the last one on February 2, 1971 at Civil Aviation Plant No. 412. After the repair, it had flown 2,291 hours and made 1,516 landings. The aircraft had a general technical resource of 20,000 flight hours and 12,000 landings.

== Aftermath ==
Pravda reported on the crash of Flight 1491 shortly after it happened. At the time, it was unusual in the Soviet Union for there to be press reports on domestic air crashes.

This crash was not the first involving the An-10; in addition, there were other crashes due to design flaws (the crash of Aeroflot Flight 1969 was also caused by wing separation; at Kurumoch Airport, a wing broke off an An-10 during towing).

Following the completion of the investigation, it was decided to ground all An-10 and An-10A aircraft. Aeroflot soon issued an order to write off their fleet of An-10 and An-10As, except for a small number of aircraft that had low operating hours (following inspection, they were transferred to transport units of the Ministry of Aviation as cargo freighters). One An-10 at the Wittstock training ground in East Germany was even relegated to a target. Eleven other aircraft were installed in various Soviet cities for other uses, such as aviation monuments, shooting galleries and children's cafes. The sole surviving An-10 is at the Central Air Force Museum at Monino.

== Memorials ==
The crew and the unidentified remains of those killed are buried at the 5th city cemetery of Kharkiv near Kharkiv Airport.

At the main crash site of the fuselage, a monument was erected with the inscription: "You are forever alive in our hearts", although it has disappeared over the years; only a piece of reinforcement remains, with an iron wreath hung on it.

== See also ==
- Aeroflot accidents and incidents in the 1970s
- Aeroflot Flight 1969
