= Ilyushin Il-18 =

Soviet medium- to long-range airliner with 4 turboprop engines, 1957

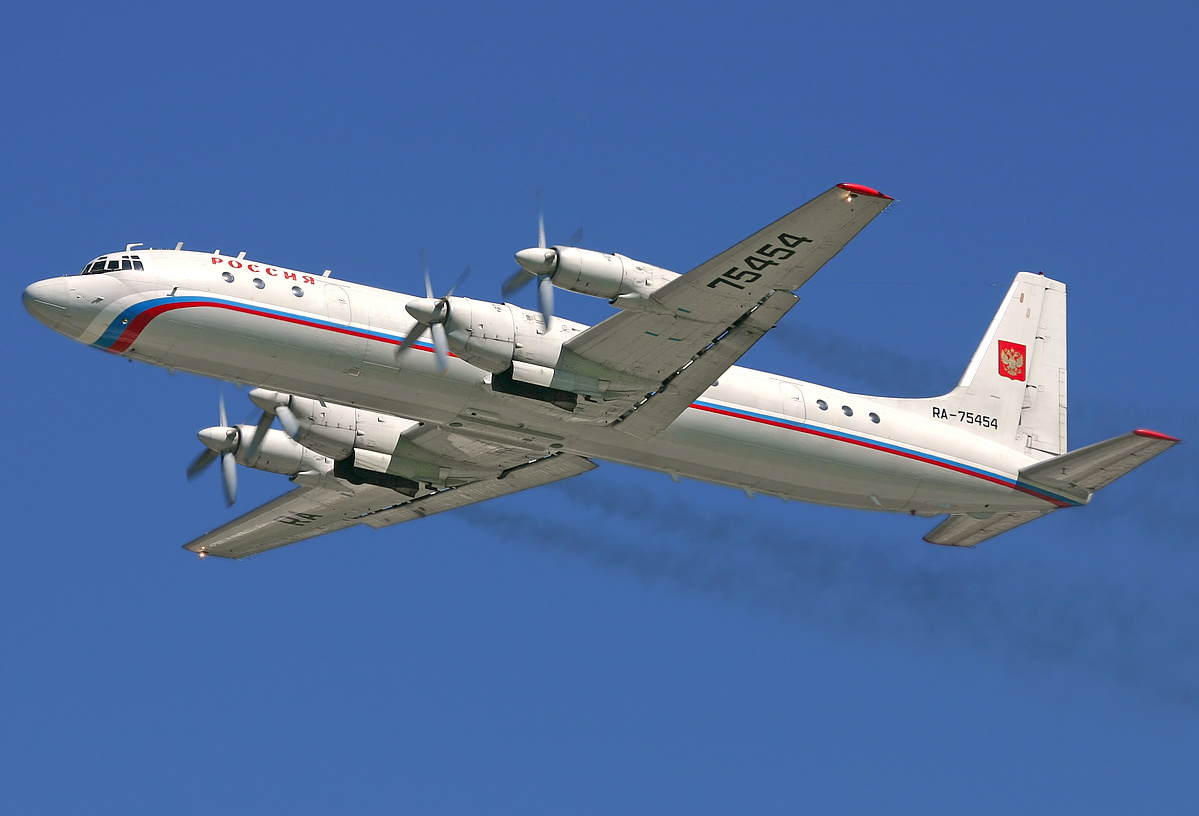
- A Russian Air Transport Il-18

General information
- Type: Turboprop airliner and reconnaissance aircraft
- National origin: Soviet Union
- Manufacturer: Moscow Machinery Plant No. 30
- Designer: Ilyushin
- Status: In limited service
- Primary users: Russian Air Force Russian Naval Aviation; Air Koryo; Aeroflot (historical)
- Number built: at least 678

History
- Manufactured: 1957–1985
- First flight: 4 July 1957
- Variants: Ilyushin Il-20M; Ilyushin Il-38
- Successors: Ilyushin Il-62

The Ilyushin Il-18 (Russian: Илью́шин Ил-18; NATO reporting name: Coot) is a large turboprop airliner that first flew in 1957 and became one of the best known Soviet aircraft of its era. The Il-18 was one of the Soviet Union's principal airliners for several decades and was widely exported. Due to the aircraft's durability, many examples remain operational with the Russian Air Force and Russian Navy. The Il-18's successor was the longer-range Ilyushin Il-62.

== Design and development ==
Two Soviet aircraft shared the designation Ilyushin Il-18. The first Il-18 was a propeller-driven airliner of 1946 but after a year of test flights that programme was abandoned.

In the early 1950s with a need to replace older designs and increase the size of the Soviet civil transport fleet, a Soviet Council of Ministers directive was issued on 30 December 1955 to the chief designers Kuznetsov and Ivchenko to develop new turboprop engines and to Ilyushin and Antonov to design an aircraft to use these engines. The two aircraft designs were developed as the Ilyushin Il-18 and the Antonov An-10 and the engine chosen was the Kuznetsov NK-4 rather than the Ivchenko AI-20.

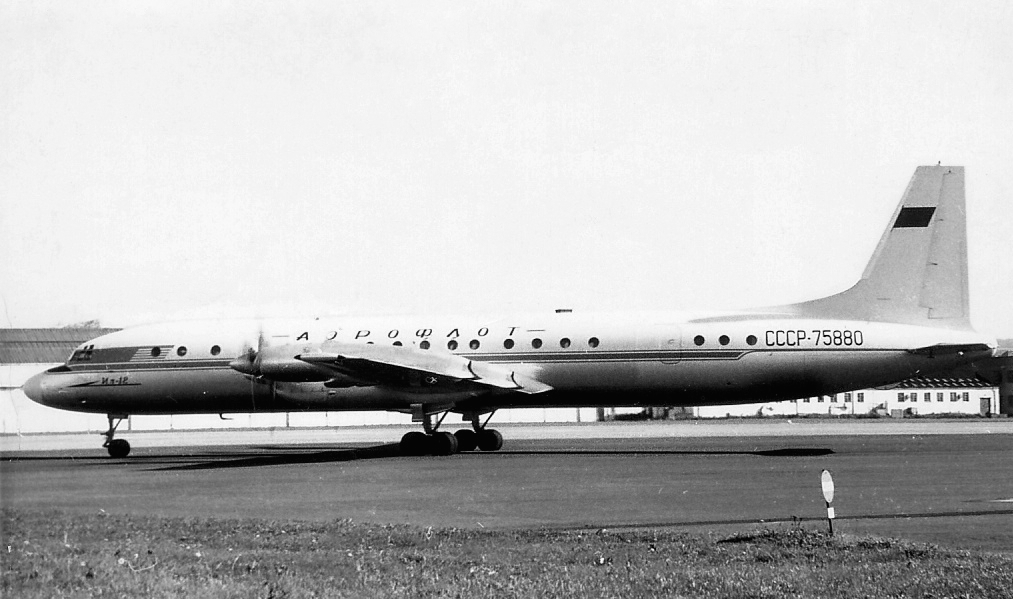
Aeroflot Il-18V at Prestwick Airport, 1960s

The Il-18 design had started in 1954 before the directive was issued and experience with the piston-engined Il-18 was used although the aircraft was a new design. The design was for a four-engined low-wing monoplane with a circular pressurised fuselage and a conventional tail. The forward retracting tricycle landing gear had four wheels fitted on the main leg bogies, the main legs bogies rotated 90 degrees and retracted into the rear of the inboard engines. A new feature at the time was the fitting of a weather radar in the nose and it was the first Soviet airliner to have an automatic approach system. The aircraft has two entry doors on the port-side before and after the wing and two overwing emergency exits on each side.

The prototype SSSR-L5811 was rolled out in June 1957 and after ground-testing it began taxi test and high-speed runs on 1 July 1957. On 4 July 1957 the prototype first flew from Khodynka. On 10 July 1957 the aircraft was flown to Moscow-Vnukovo Airport to be presented to a Soviet government commission; also present was the prototype Antonov An-10 and the Tupolev Tu-114. The Il-18 type was formally named Moskva and this was painted on the fuselage, although the name was not used when the aircraft entered production.

The Moscow Machinery Plant No. 30 located at Khodynka, near where the Ilyushin design office and the prototype had been built, was chosen to manufacture the aircraft. During 1957 the plant began to reduce its production of the Ilyushin Il-14 and prepare to build the production aircraft designated IL-18A. The Il-18A was only different from the prototype in minor details, mainly internal configuration to increase the seating from 75 to 89.

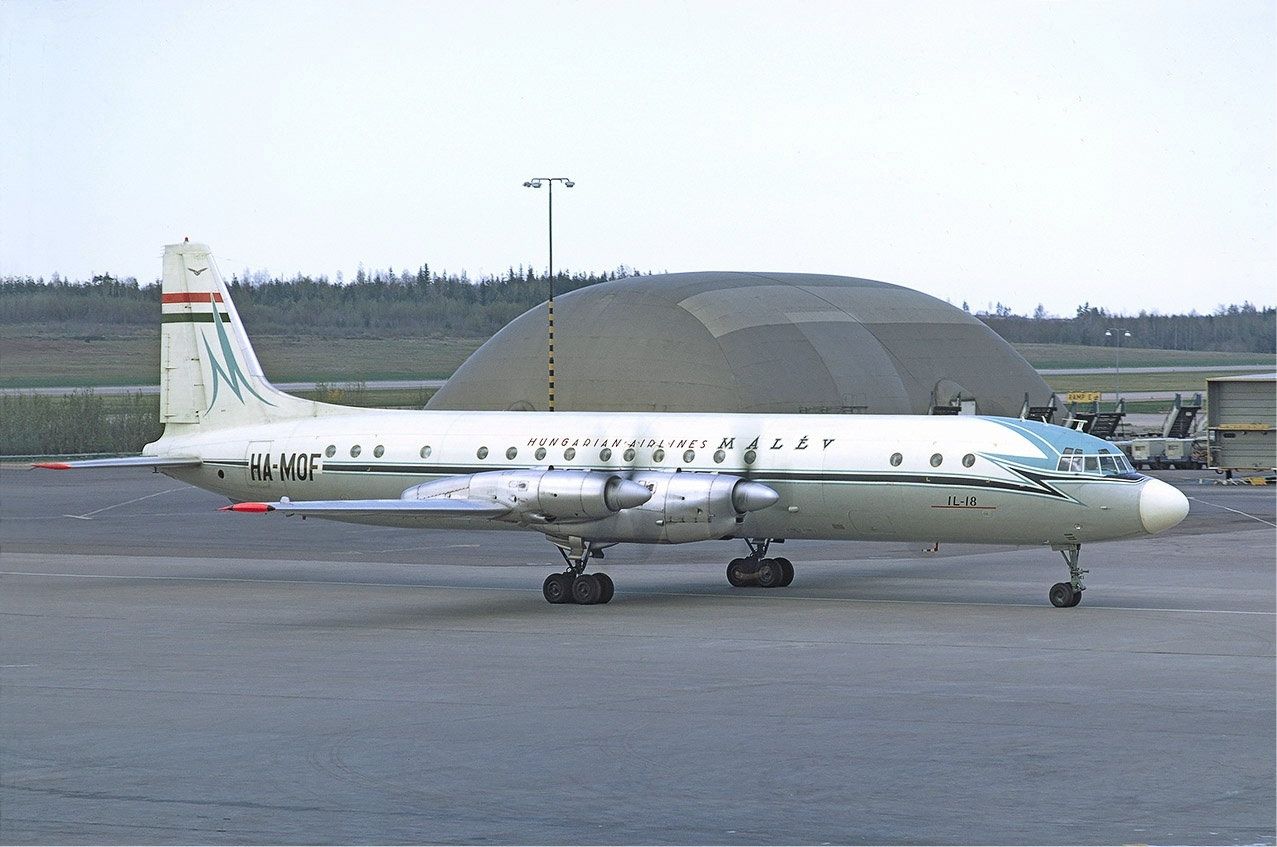
Malev Il-18 in Sweden, 1972

The first production aircraft were powered by the Kuznetsov NK-4 but the engines were plagued with problems so the Council of Ministers decreed in July 1958 that all production from November 1958 would use the Ivchenko AI-20 and earlier production would be re-engined. Only 20 IL-18As were built before production changed to the improved Il-18B; this new variant had a higher gross weight and the nose was re-designed with a larger radome which increased the length by 20 cm. The first Il-18B flew on 30 September 1958 powered by the AI-20; a VIP variant was also built as the IL-18S for the Soviet Air Force. From April 1961 a TG-18 Auxiliary Power Unit was fitted for ground starting rather than the bank of lead-acid batteries. Some aircraft were modified to allow the APU to be run in flight.

With experience of the earlier aircraft a further improvement was the Il-18V variant. The Il-18V was structurally the same but the interior was re-designed including moving the galley and some minor system changes. The first Il-18V appeared in December 1959 and was to continue into production until 1965 after 334 had been built. Specialised variants of the aircraft also appeared, including aircraft modified for flight calibration and a long-range polar variant. Military variants also appeared including the anti-submarine Ilyushin Il-38.

== Operational history ==
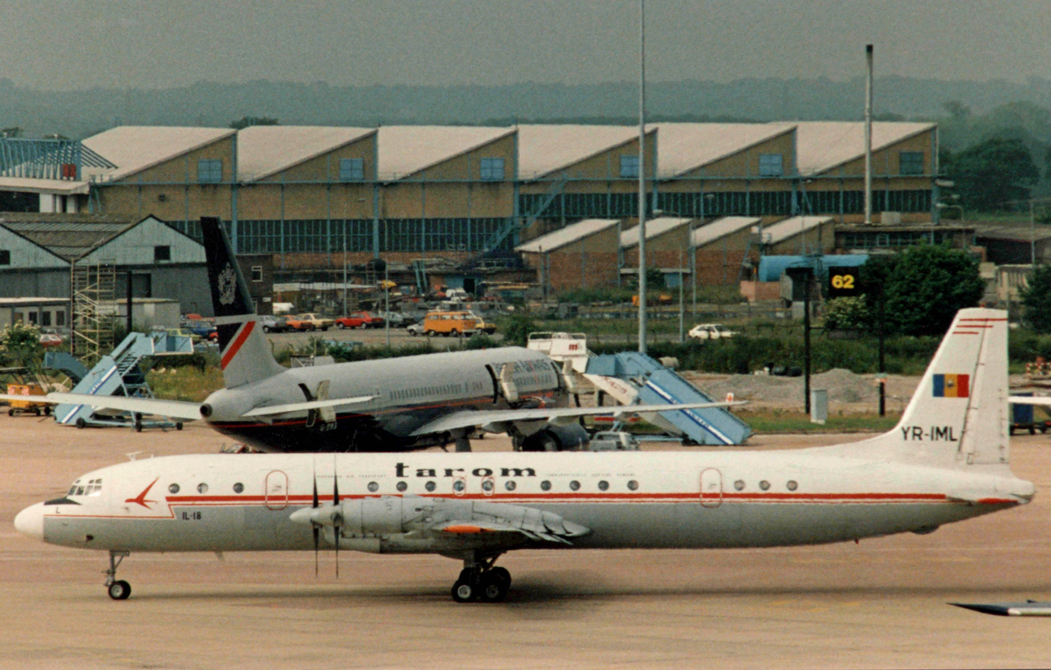
Ilyushin Il-18D of TAROM at Manchester Airport in 1988

The first Il-18, initially equipped with Kuznetsov NK-4 engines, flew on 4 July 1957. On 17 September 1958 the aircraft first flew with the new Ivchenko AI-20 engines. Vladimir Kokkinaki was the test pilot. Between 1958 and 1960 twenty-five world records were set by this aircraft, among them flight range and altitude records with various payloads. In 1958 the aircraft was awarded the Brussels World Fair Grand Prix. In April 1979 a monument was unveiled at Sheremetyevo airport to commemorate the aircraft.

Seventeen foreign air carriers acquired some 125 Il-18 aircraft, seating 100-120 passengers. Il-18s are still in service in Siberia, North Korea and the Middle East, whilst a number of examples manufactured in the mid-1960s were still in civilian use in Africa and south Asia as of 2014. The type operates in various military capacities, including the Il-22PP electronic warfare and reconnaissance aircraft which entered service in October 2016. A modernized Il-20M with improved radar, radio and optical-electronic reconnaissance equipment entered service in July 2020 to provide secure targeting to Kh-47M2 Kinzhal missile system.

An Il-18 (registration DDR-STD) belonging to Interflug and used as a transport by East German leaders, including Erich Honecker, has been converted into a static hotel suite at Teuge Airfield in The Netherlands.

As of July 2018, there are 7 aircraft in airliner service with 6 operators.

The Il-18/20/22 are serving in the Russian Air Force as reconnaissance and command post aircraft.

On 17 September 2018, an Il-20M was accidentally shot down with 15 people on board near Latakia, Syria.

On 24 June 2023, an airborne command-center Il-22 was shot down during the Wagner Group rebellion. All ten crew members were killed.

On 14 January 2024 Ukrainian media sources reported that an Il-22 was shot down along the sea of Azov. The aircraft successfully crash landed at Anapa Airport. It was claimed to have been damaged beyond repair.

== Variants ==
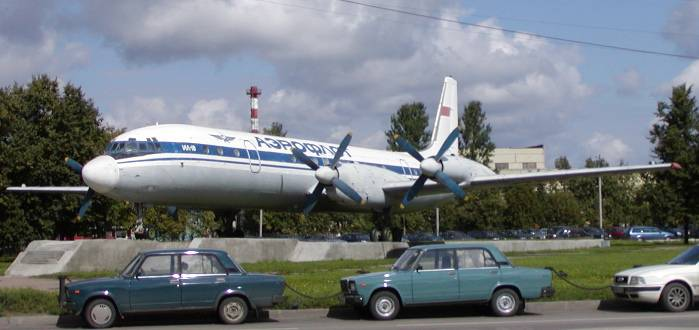
Il-18 on display at Sheremetyevo International Airport

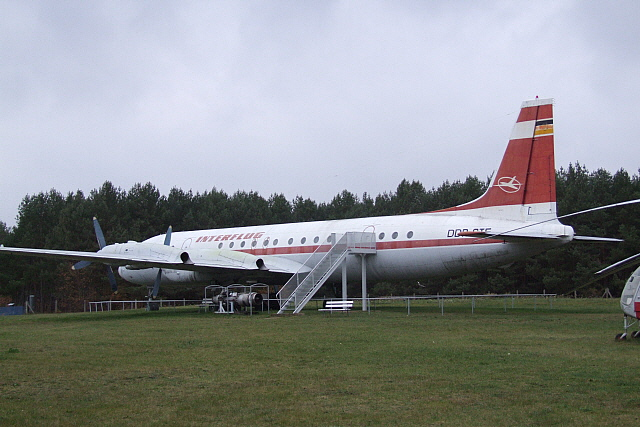
An example at a museum in Borkheide, Germany

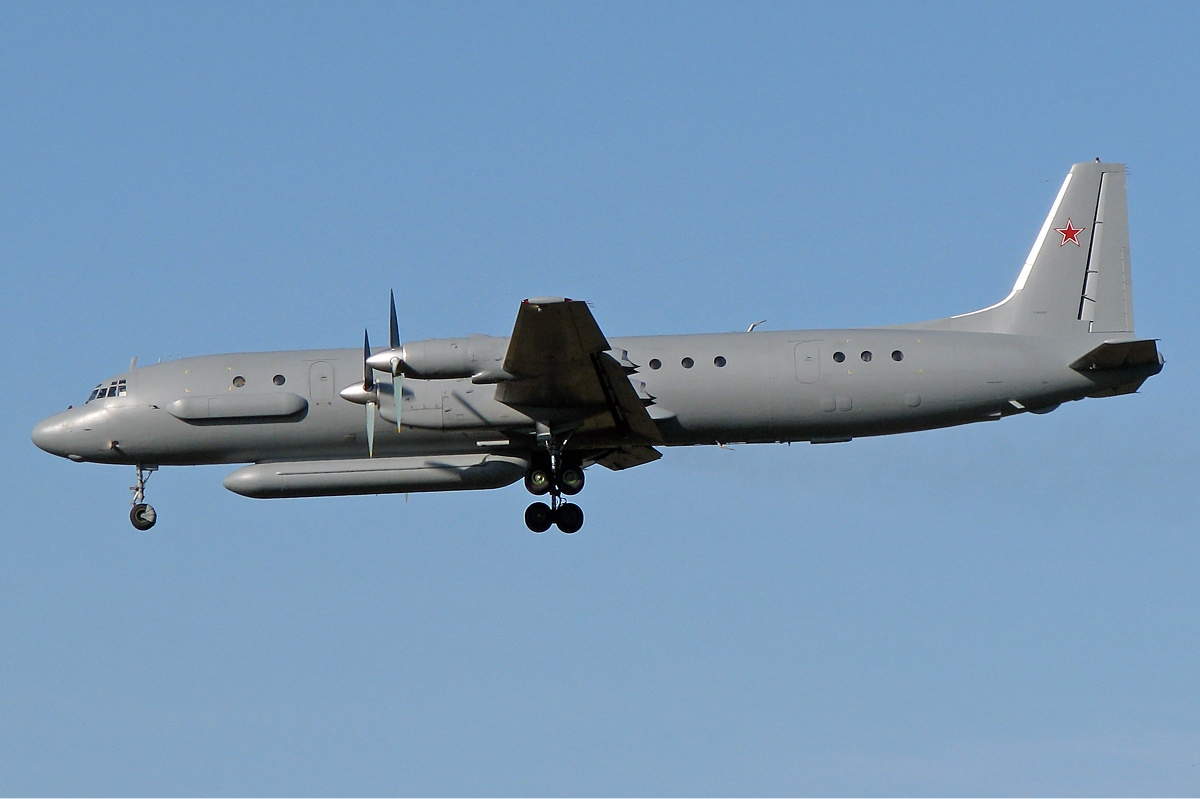
An Il-20M in 2009

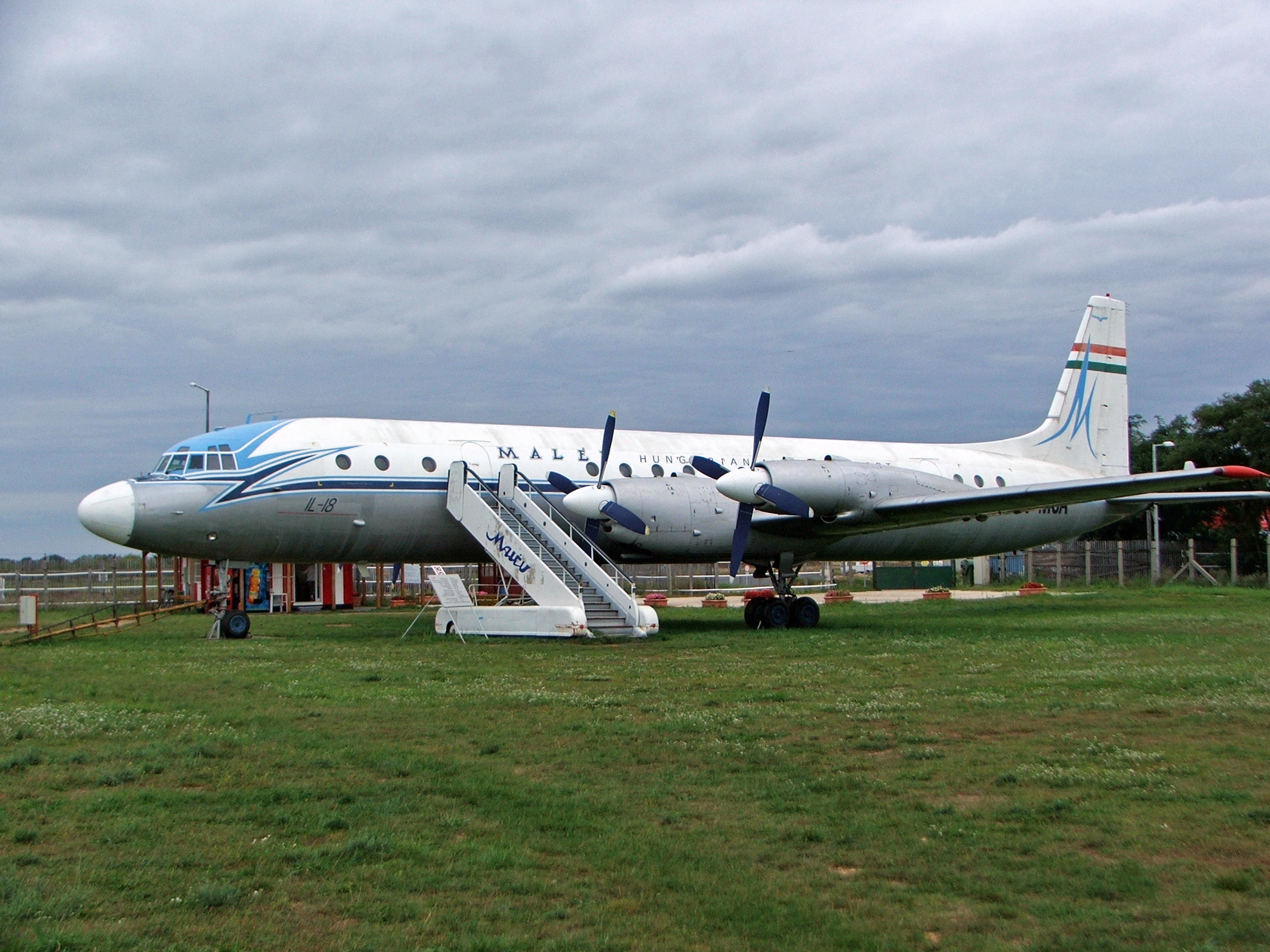
Malev Il-18 in at an open-air aircraft museum at the Budapest Ferihegy International Airport

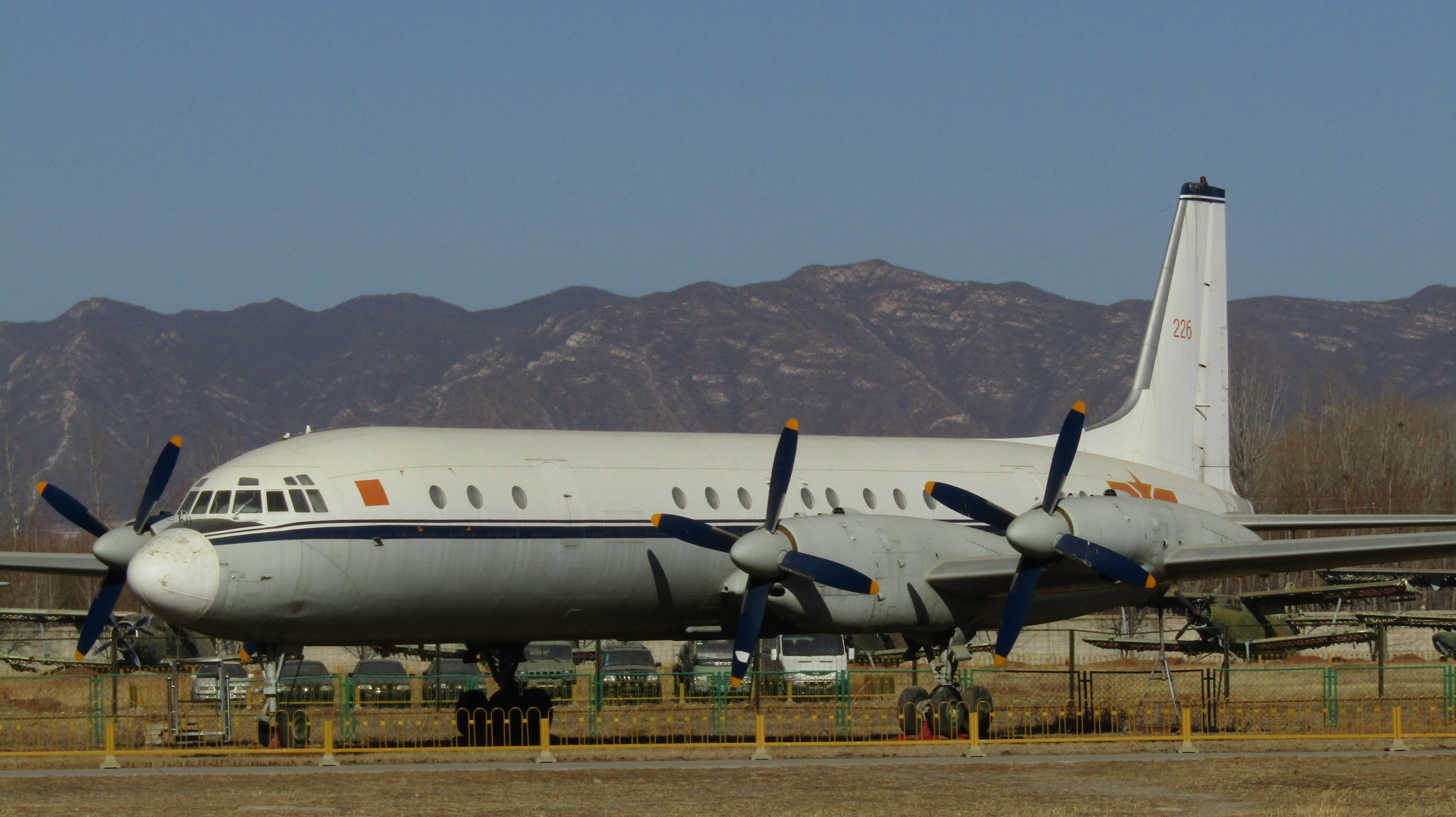
Ilyushin Il-18D at China Aviation Museum, Beijing

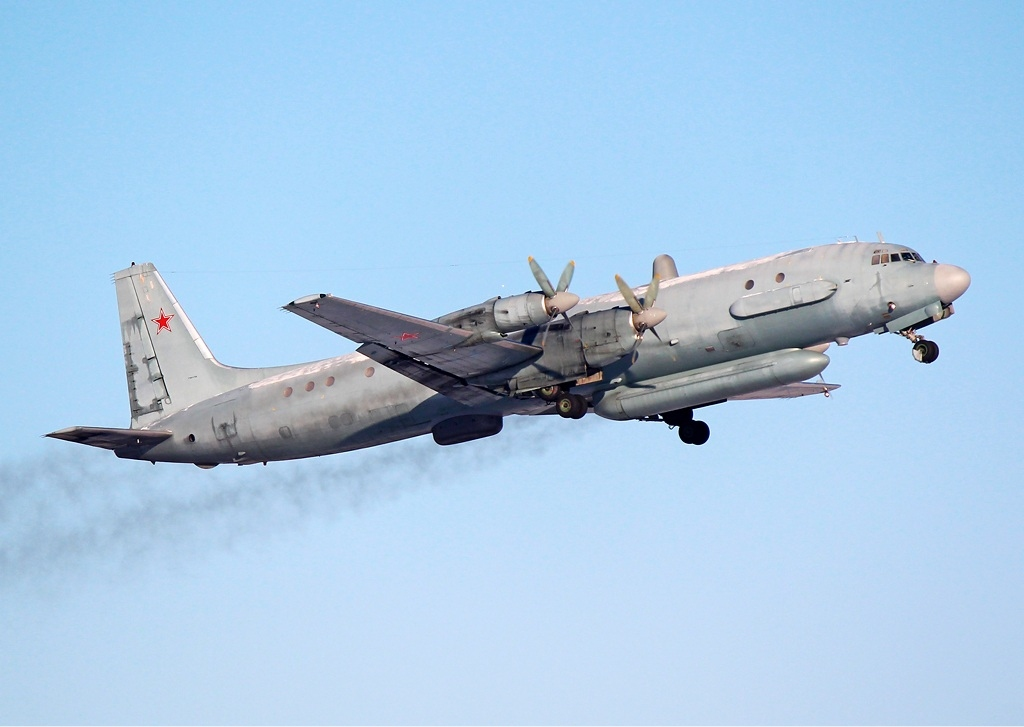
Russian Air Force Ilyushin Il-20M

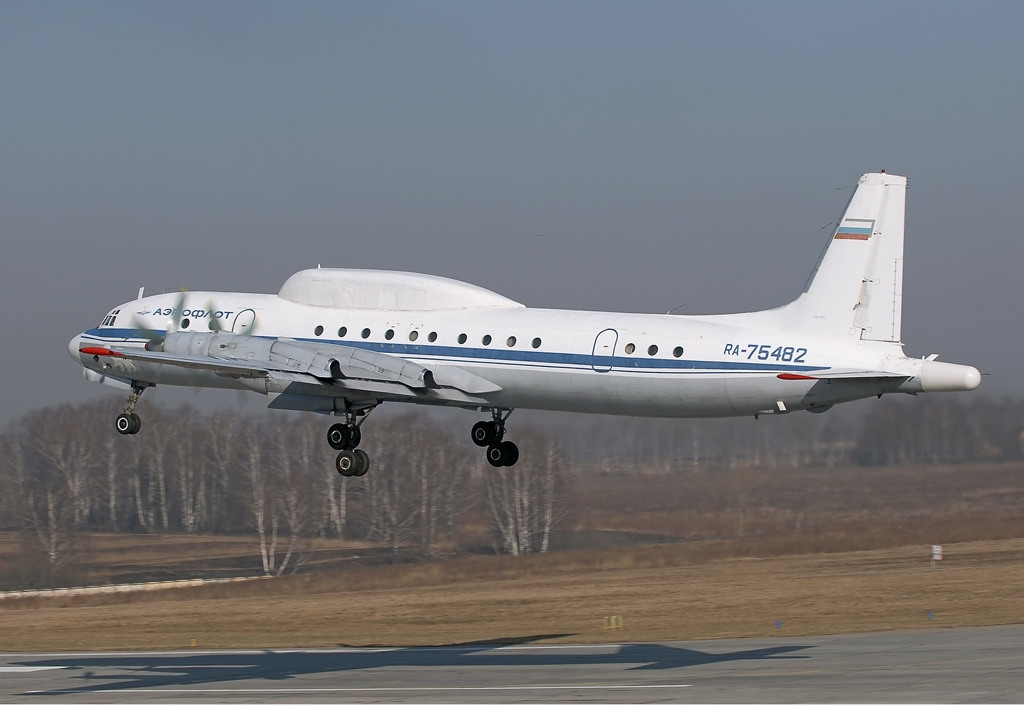
Il-20RT, Telemetry aircraft

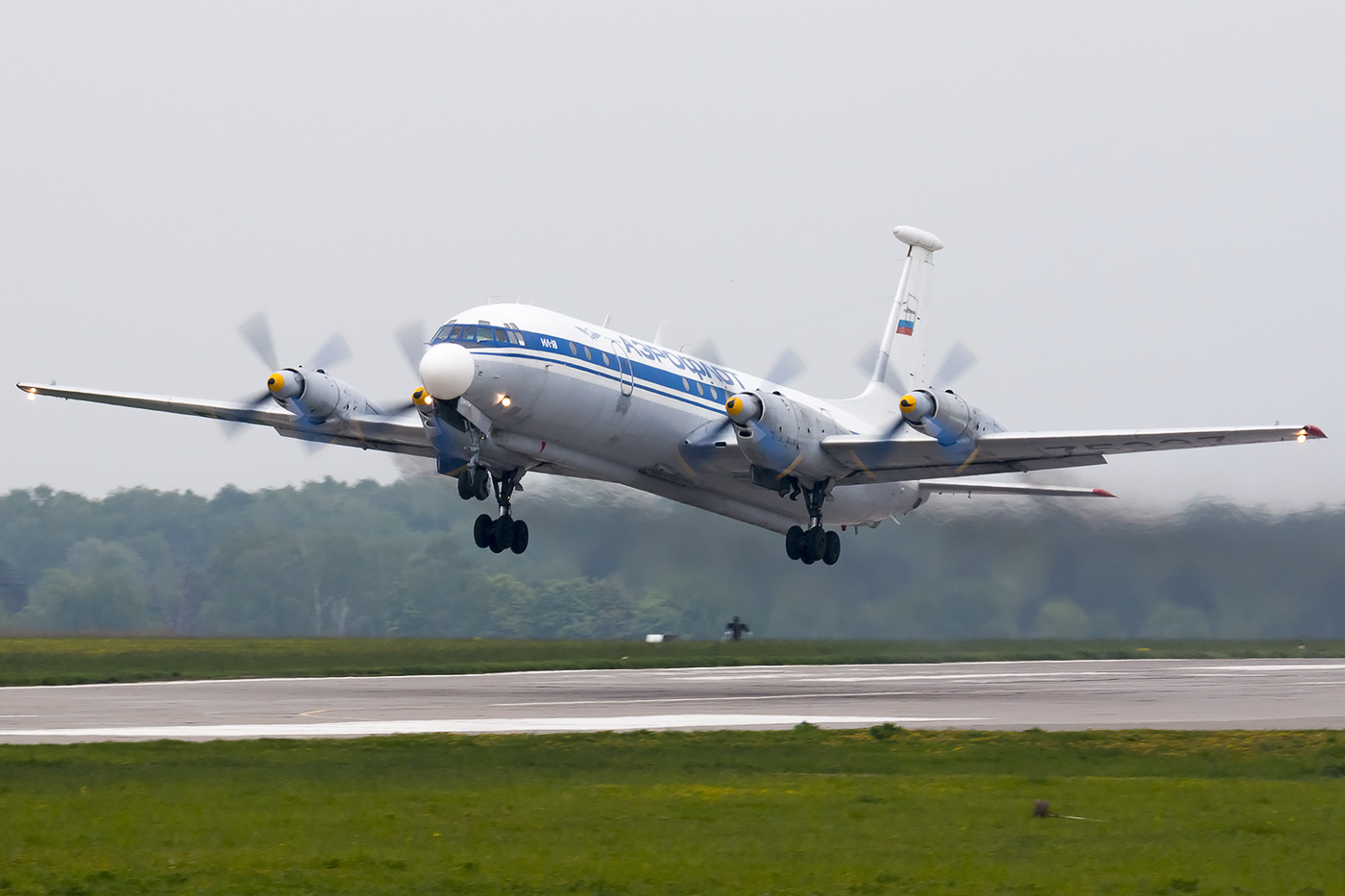
Il-22M, Airborne command post modernized version

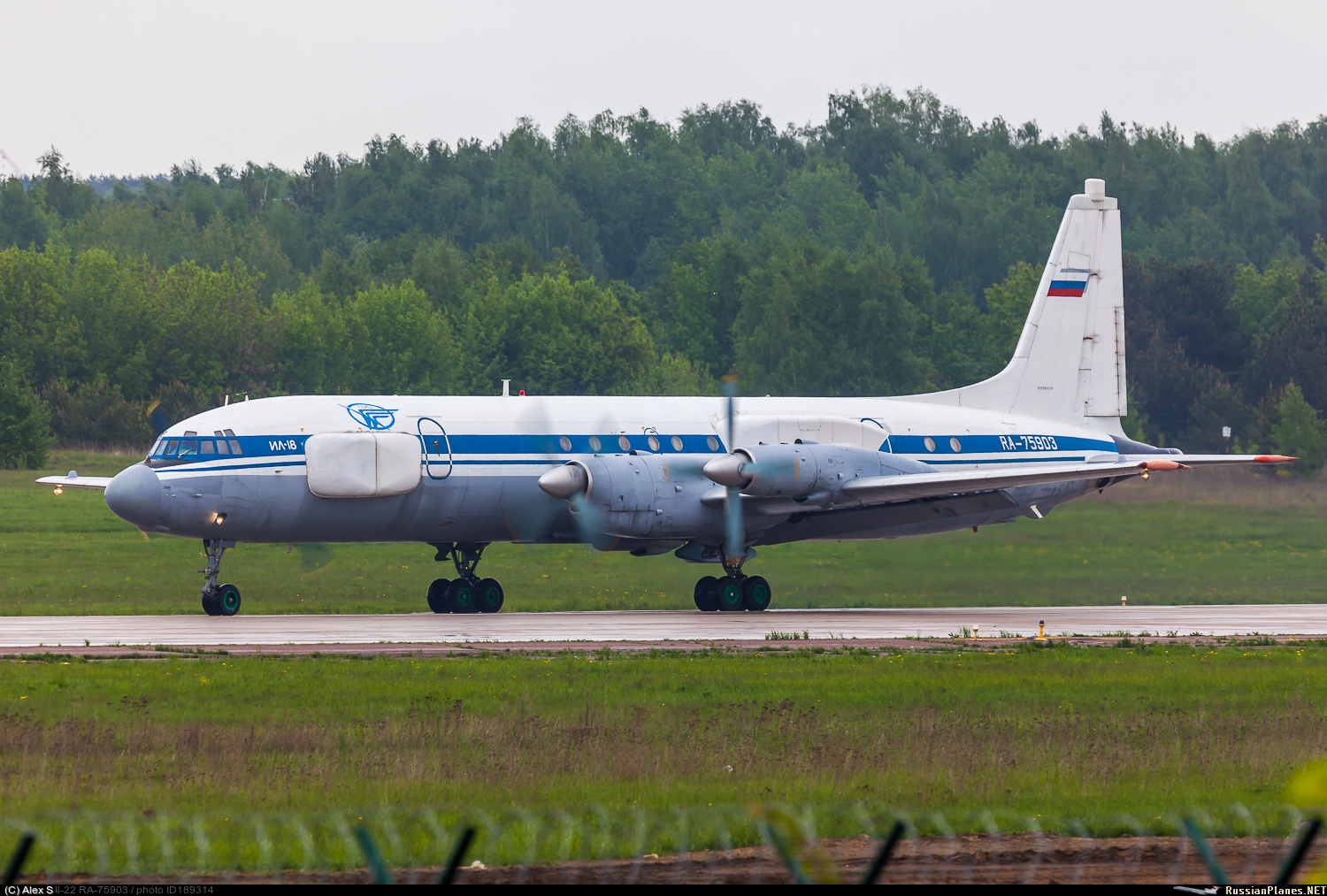
Il-22PP "Porubshchik", EW, ECM airplane

Data from:OKB Ilyushin

Il-18
Designation of the sole prototype of the Il-18 family.
Il-18A
The original production model, equivalent to pre-production, powered by either Kuznetsov NK-4 or Ivchenko AI-20 turboprop engines. Circa 20 built.
Il-18B
First major production model, a medium-haul airliner that could seat 84 passengers.
Il-18 Combi
Il-18 aircraft modified to mixed passenger / cargo configuration
Il-18D
Similar to Il-18I, but equipped with an extra center section fuel tank for increased range. The Il-18D is fitted with four 3,169 kW (4,250 shp) Ivchenko AI-20M turboprop engines.
Il-18D communications relay
Three aircraft modified to provide communications relay between VIP aircraft and Government bodies.
Il-18D Pomor
A single Il-18D converted to a fisheries reconnaissance aircraft (Pomor = person who lives by the sea)
Il-18D Salon
VIP version of the Il-18D
Il-18DORR
Two Il-18Ds modified as fishery reconnaissance aircraft for the Polar Institute of Oceanic Fishery and Oceanography, the modification mainly involved the fitment of specialized mission equipment. First flown in 1985 they were later modified back as standard Il-18Ds.
Il-18E
Similar to the Il-18I, but without the increased fuel capacity.
Il-18E Salon
VIP transport version of the Il-18E.
Il-18Gr
Aircraft converted to cargo configuration, (Gr - Gruzovoy - cargo).
Il-18GrM
Several Il-18 aircraft modified to Gr standard with the addition of a pressurised side cargo door.
Il-18I
Equipped with more powerful Ivchenko AI-20M turboprop engines, producing 3,169 kW (4,250 shp). Seating increased to 122 passengers in an enlarged cabin gained by moving the aft pressure bulkhead rearwards by 1.64 m (5 ft).
Il-18LL
(Letayuschchaya Laboratoriya - flying laboratory), one aircraft modified from an Il-18A to be an anti-icing test-bed and an Il-18V used by the Czechoslovak flight test center as an engine testbed.
Il-18RT
Two Il-18Vs were modified as Telemetry Relay Aircraft to rocket and unmanned air vehicle trials.
Il-18RTL
Prototype for Il-20RT, converted from Il-18A c/n 188000401.
Il-18S
VIP variant of Il-18B
Il-18SL
Designation of a number of different test and research aircraft, normally had a letter suffix like SL-18D for avionics trials.
Il-18T
This designation was given to civil and military cargo transport aircraft converted from Il-18A/B/V aircraft.

Il-18AT: Military transport/medevac version based on the Il-18A
Il-18BT: Military transport/medevac version based on the Il-18B
Il-18VT: Military transport/medevac version based on the Il-18V

Il-18TD
One Il-18T was modified as a military transport variant to take either 69 stretcher cases or 118 paratroopers. Not wanted by the military it was converted to Il-18D standard.
Il-18USh
One Il-18V was modified as a navigator trainer including two dorsal astro-sextant windows. Although it was tested and found acceptable the Soviet Air Force used a variant of the twin-jet Tupolev Tu-124 instead.
Il-18V
Standard Aeroflot version, which entered service in 1961. The Il-18V was powered by four Ivchenko AI-20K turboprop engines, seating 90-100 passengers.
Il-18V Salon
VIP version of the Il-18V
Il-18V/polar
a single Il-18V modified for Polyarnaya Aviatsiya - Polar Aviation use.
Il-18V-26A
a single Il-18V modified for Polyarnaya Aviatsiya - Polar Aviation use with an auxiliary fuel tank in the cabin, revised window layout and enlarged oil tanks on the engines, covered by protruding fairings on the engine nacelles (sometimes referred to as the Il-18D, before the real D model emerged).
Il-18V calibrator
a single Il-18V operated by Interflug for navaid calibration.
Il-20M (NATO reporting name: Coot-A)
COMINT/ELINT reconnaissance airplane version.
Il-20RT
Four Telemetry aircraft used to support the Soviet space activities, later replaced by a variant of the Il-76.
Il-22 (NATO reporting name: Coot-B)
Airborne command post version. (Not to be confused with 1947 prototype Soviet jet-engined bomber Il-22.)
Il-22M
Airborne command post version same as the Il-22 but had new mission equipment.
Il-22PP
Electronic warfare and reconnaissance aircraft. Began development in autumn 2009, one unit built and entered service with the EW detachment of the 117th Military Transport Aviation Regiment.
Il-24N
Two Il-18Ds modified for ice reconnaissance similar to the Il-20M but with civilian reconnaissance equipment, both later modified back to standard configuration and sold.
Il-38
Maritime reconnaissance, anti-submarine warfare version.
Il-118
A proposed upgrade powered by two Lotarev D-236-T propfan engines.

== Operators ==
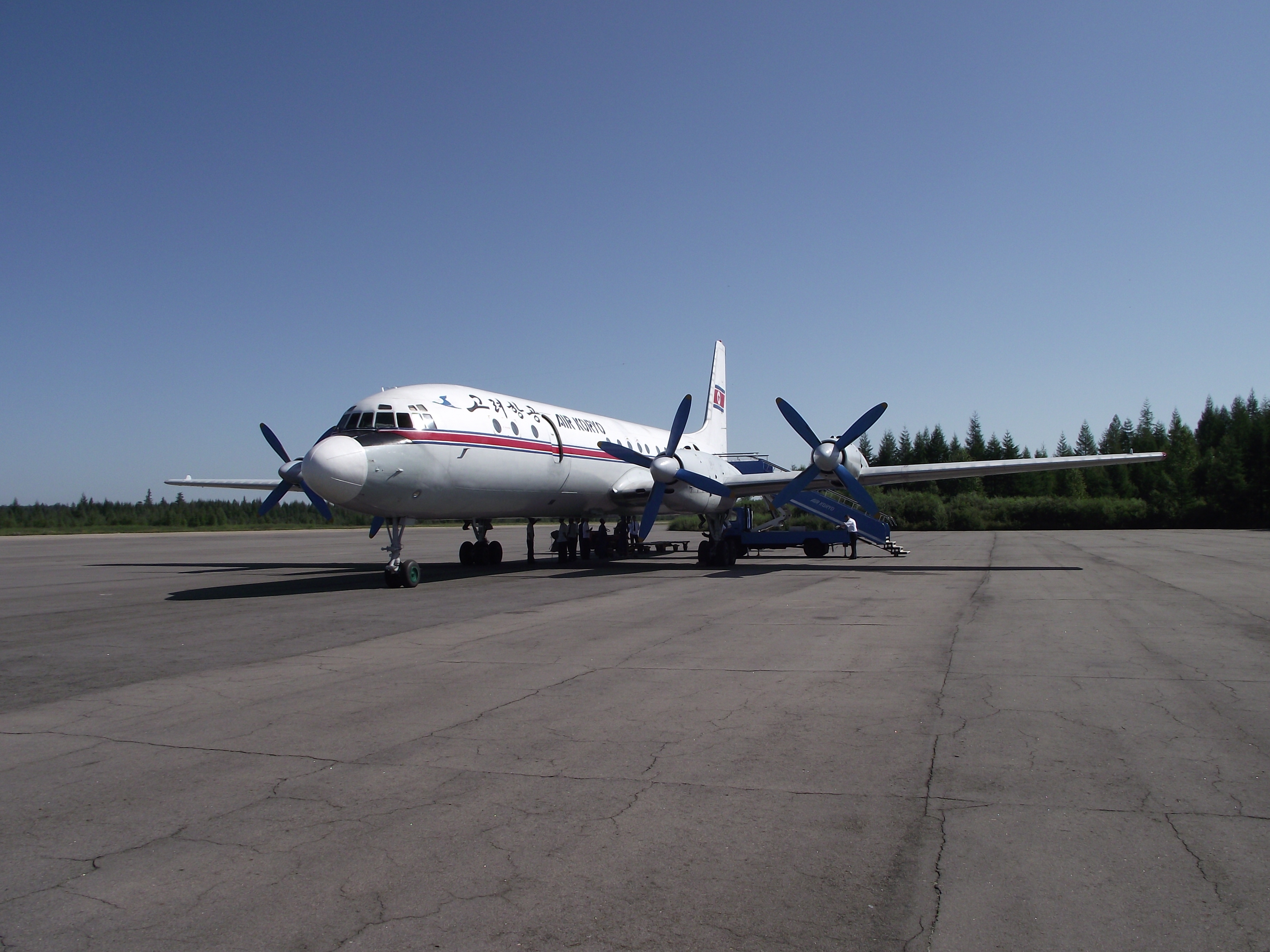
Il-18 of North Korean national airline Air Koryo.

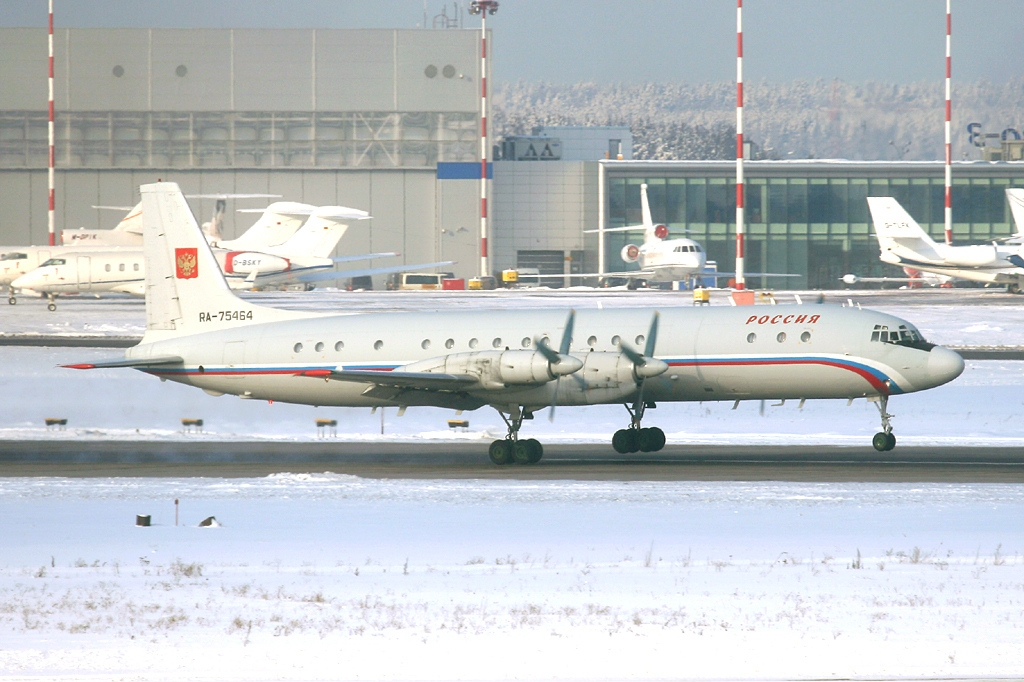
Il-18 of Rossiya Airlines.

=== Civil operators ===
==== Current operators ====
Russia

- NPP MIR (ChK Leninets) - 1 in cargo service

Democratic People's Republic of Korea

- Air Koryo - 1 Il-18D in service, 1 Il-18V stored

==== Former operators ====
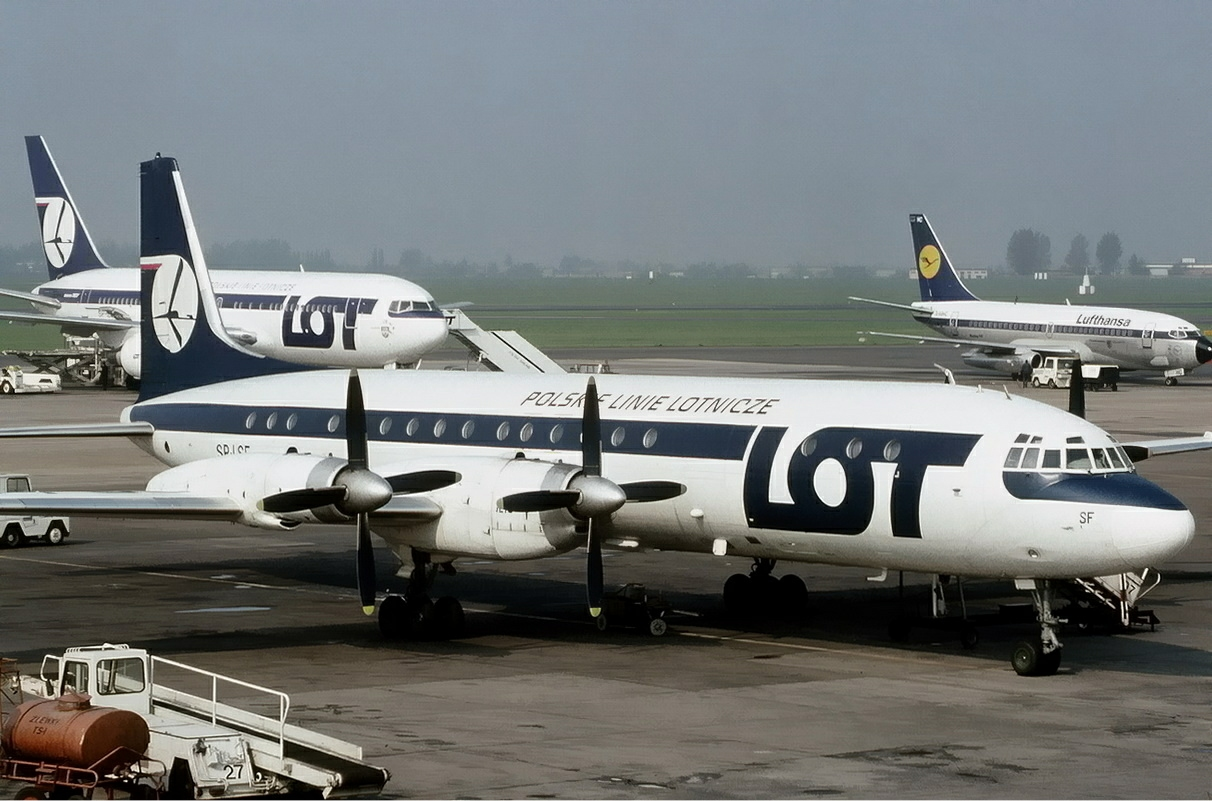
Il-18E of LOT Polish Airlines in Warsaw. (1990)

Afghanistan

- Ariana Afghan Airlines

China

- CAAC Airlines

Bulgaria

- Balkan Airlines Il-18 and 18D

Cuba

- Aerocaribbean Il-18 and 18V
- Cubana

Czechoslovakia

- Czechoslovak Airlines

Djibouti

- Daallo Airlines

Germany

- Berline Il-18 and 18Gr
- German European Airlines

East Germany

- Deutsche Lufthansa
- Interflug (16 operated)

Egypt

- Egyptair (formerly United Arab Airlines)

Ghana

- Ghana Airways (8 purchased, 4 later returned to the USSR)

Guinea

- Air Guinée

Hungary

- Malév Hungarian Airlines Il-18V

Kazakhstan

- Irbis Aero

Kyrgyzstan

- Anikay Air

Mali

- Air Mali

Poland

- LOT (10 operated from 1961 until the early 1990s)
- Polonia Airways (1 operated in 90s)
- Polnippon (3 operated from 1990 until 1996)

Romania

- Tarom

Soviet Union

- Aeroflot

Russia

- ASTAir
- Domodedovo Airlines
- GVG Airline
- Rossiya
- Tretyakovo Airlines

Somalia

- Daallo Airlines
- Jubba Airways

Sri Lanka

- FitsAir

Ukraine

- Lviv Airlines
- Sevastopol Avia

United Arab Emirates

- Phoenix Aviation

Vietnam

- Vietnam Airlines

Yemen

- Yemen Airways

=== Military operators ===
Current operators:

Russia

- Russian Aerospace Forces – Il-18,Il-20, Il-20M, Il-22PP and Il-38 versions

Former operators:

Afghanistan

- Afghan Air Force

Algeria

- Algerian Air Force

Bulgaria

- Government of Bulgaria

Czechoslovakia

- Czechoslovak Air Force

East Germany

- East German Air Force

Georgia

- Georgian Air Force

Ghana

- Ghana Air Force − Were returned to the Soviet Union after Kwame Nkrumah was overthrown.

North Yemen

- North Yemen Air Force

Poland

- Polish Air Force (VIP Transport, replaced by Tupolev Tu-134)

Romania

- Government of Romania

Soviet Union

- Soviet Air Forces
- Soviet Naval Aviation

Vietnam

- Vietnam People's Air Force

Yugoslavia

- SFR Yugoslav Air Force

Indonesia

- A presidential aircraft presented to President Sukarno by the Soviet Union.

== Specifications (Il-18D) ==
Layout of Il-18

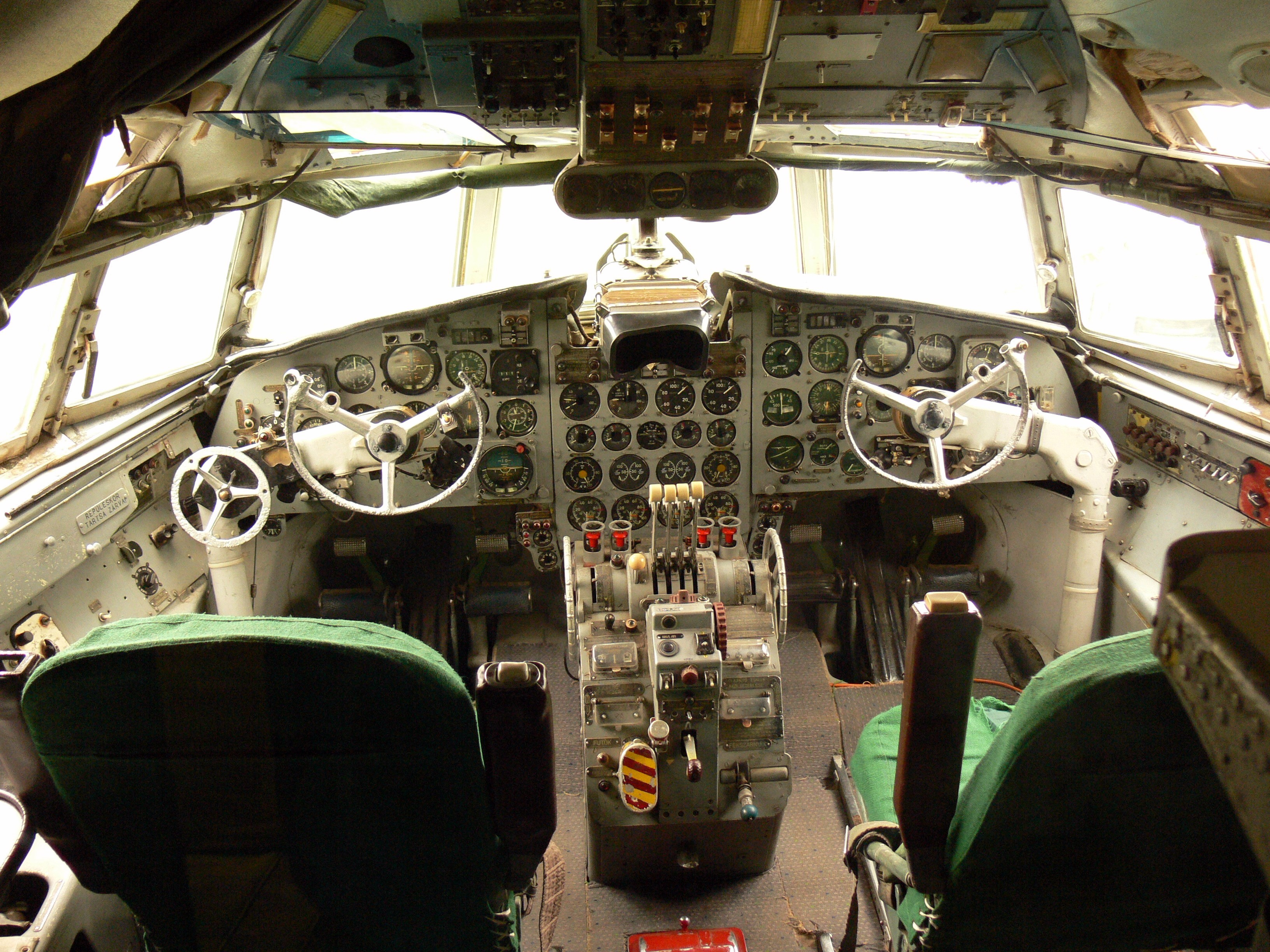
Cockpit of Il-18

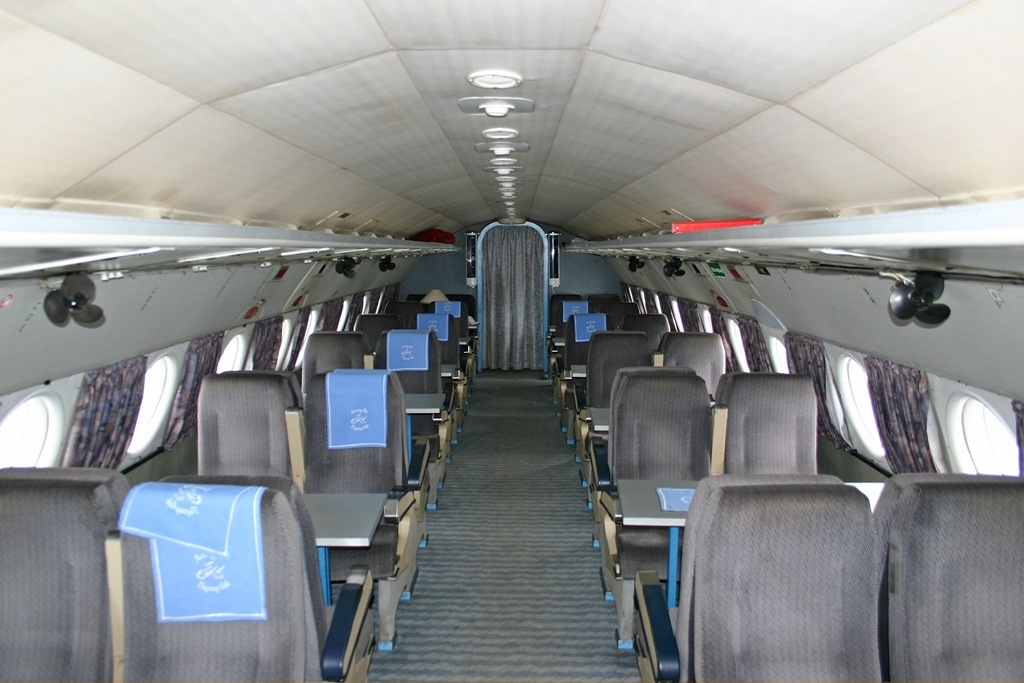
Cabin of Il-18 (Interflug)

Data from OKB Ilyushin

General characteristics

- Crew: 9
- Capacity: 65-120 passengers
- Length: 35.9 m (117 ft 9 in)
- Wingspan: 37.4 m (122 ft 8 in)
- Height: 10.165 m (33 ft 4 in)
- Wing area: 140 m^{2} (1,500 sq ft)
- Empty weight: 35,000 kg (77,162 lb)
- Max takeoff weight: 64,000 kg (141,096 lb)
- Fuel capacity: 30,000 L (6,599 imp gal; 7,925 US gal)
- Fuselage diameter: 3.5 m (11 ft)
- Max. landing weight: 52,600 kg (115,963 lb)
- Max. zero-fuel weight: 48,800 kg (107,586 lb)
- Max. taxi weight : 64,500 kg (142,198 lb)
- Powerplant: 4 × Ivchenko AI-20M axial flow turboprop engines, 3,170 kW (4,250 hp) each
- Propellers: 4-bladed AW-68 I constant speed feathering propellers, 4.5 m (14 ft 9 in) diameter
  - Auxiliary power unit: TG-16M (28 Volt DC)

Performance

- Maximum speed: 675 km/h (419 mph, 364 kn)
- Maximum speed: Mach 0.65
- Cruise speed: 625 km/h (388 mph, 337 kn) at 8,000 m (26,000 ft)
- Range: 6,500 km (4,000 mi, 3,500 nmi) with 6,500 kg (14,330 lb) payload, maximum fuel and reserves for one hour.
  - 3,700 km (2,299 mi; 1,998 nmi) with 13,500 kg (29,762 lb) maximum payload, at 84 - 85% of maximum continuous power.
- Service ceiling: 11,800 m (38,700 ft)
- Approach minima: ICAO CAT 1 Decision Height 60 m (200 ft) / 800 m (Visibility) or 550 m RVR
- Take-off run: 1,350 m (4,430 ft)
- Landing run: 850 m (2,790 ft)

Avionics

  - RPSN-2AMG: or RPSN-2N Emblema weather radar
  - NAS-1B: autonomous navigation system
    - DISS-1: doppler speed/drift sensor
    - ANU-1: autonomous navigation computer
  - Put'-4M: navigation system
  - KS-6G: compass system
  - DAK-DB: remote celestial compass
  - RSBN-2S Svod: SHORAN (Svod - Dome)
  - SP-50 Materik: ILS
  - RV-UM: radio altimeter
  - NI-50BM-1: navigation display
  - ARK-11:main and backup ADF (automatic direction finder)
  - RSB-5/1230: communications radio
  - RSIU-5 (R802G): command link radio, 2 of.
  - SR-2M Khrom: IFF transponder (Khrom - Chromium)
  - MSRP-12-96: flight data recorder

== See also ==
Related development

- Ilyushin Il-38

Aircraft of comparable role, configuration, and era

- Antonov An-10
- Bristol Britannia
- Canadair CL-44
- Lockheed L-188 Electra
- Vickers Vanguard
- Vickers Viscount

Related lists

- List of civil aircraft
