= Viktor Chistiakov (parodist) =

- Born: Viktor Ivanovich Chistyakov; 30 June 1943; Leningrad
- Died: 18 May 1972 (aged 28); Kharkiv
- Education: Russian State Institute of Performing Arts

Comedy career
- Genre: parody

Viktor Ivanovich Chistyakov (Russian: Виктop Иванoвич Чистякoв; June 30, 1943, Leningrad, USSR - May 18, 1972, Kharkiv, USSR) - Soviet actor and parodist. One of the first masters parody of the Soviet Union, achieved star status.

Parody he wrote at different times of the actor Stanislav Landgraf, poets Ilya Reznik and Yuri Entin.

== Death ==
On May 18, 1972, he was killed along with 121 others in the crash of Aeroflot Flight 1491 .
