= Antonov An-10 =

Soviet medium-range airliner with 4 turboprop engines, 1957

An-10 Ukraina
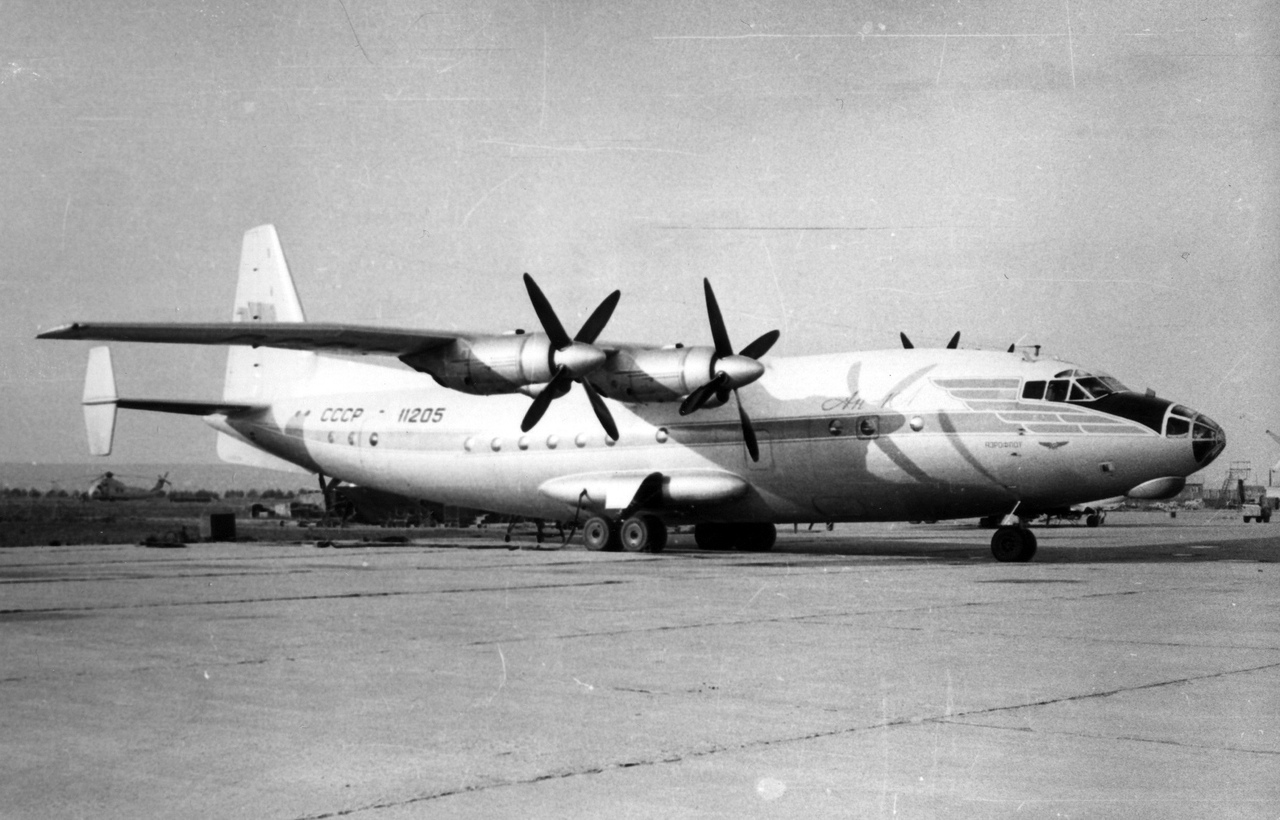

General information
- Type: Airliner
- Manufacturer: Antonov
- Designer: N. S. Trunchenkov & V. N. Ghel'prin
- Status: Retired
- Primary user: Aeroflot
- Number built: 104

History
- Introduction date: 1959
- First flight: 7 March 1957
- Retired: 1974
- Developed from: Antonov An-8
- Developed into: Antonov An-12

The Antonov An-10 Ukraina (Ukrainian: Антонов Ан-10 Україна, lit. 'Ukraine'; NATO reporting name: Cat) is a four-engined turboprop passenger transport aircraft designed in the Soviet Union.

== Design and development ==
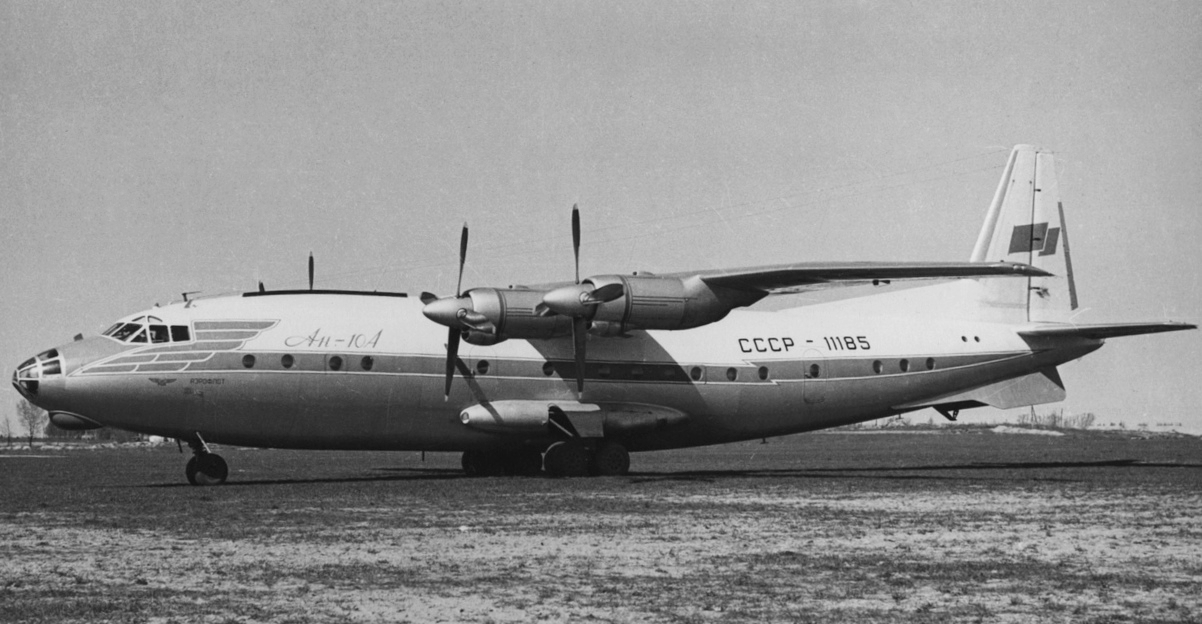
Antonov An-10A

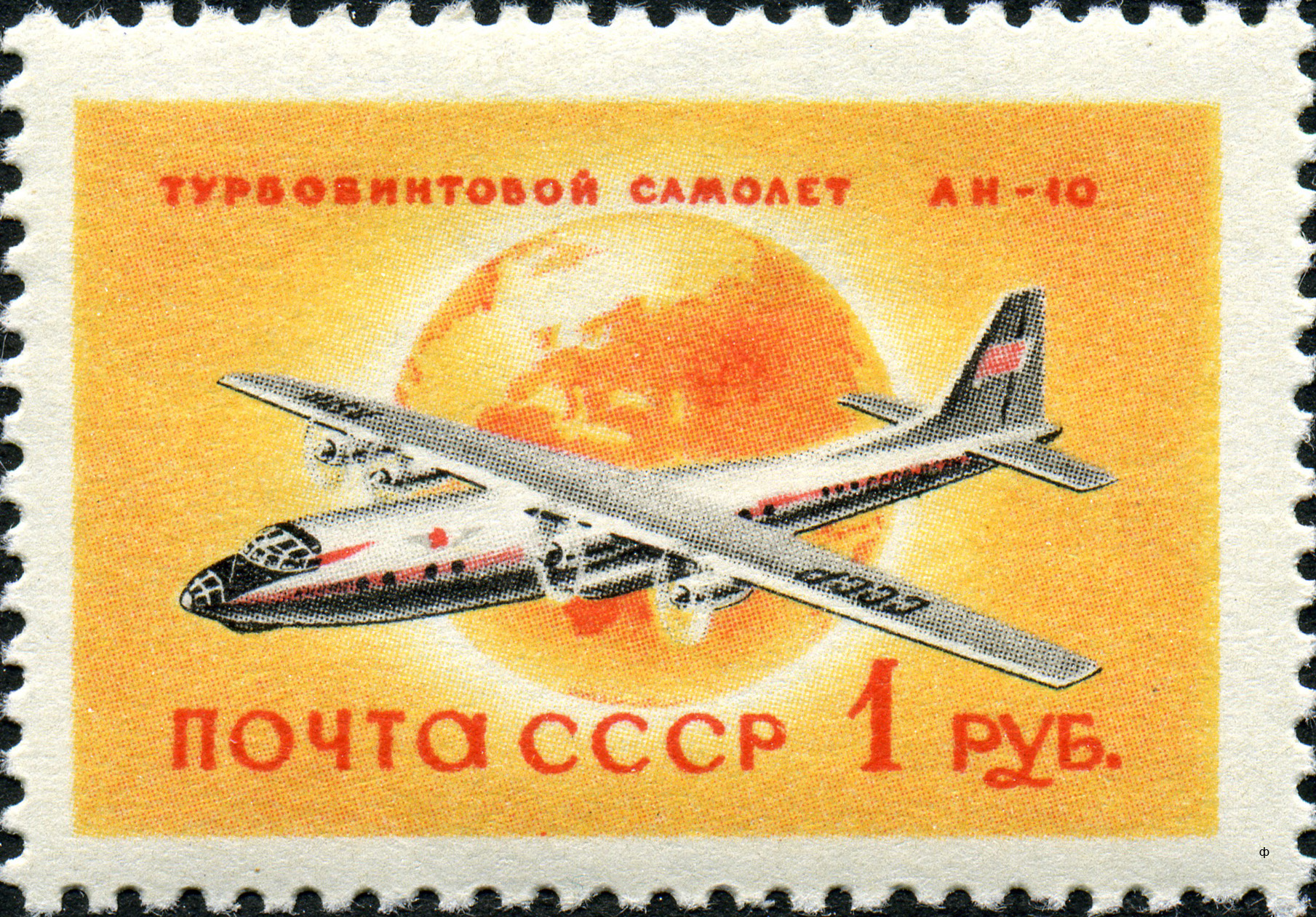
An-10 on a 1958 Soviet postage stamp

Development of a four-engined airliner intended for use on routes from 500 to 2,000 kilometers (310 to 1,240 miles) began at the end of 1955. Inspired by the Izdeliye N (Izdeliye – article or product) passenger version of the Antonov An-8, the Antonov design bureau developed the Izdeliye U ("U" for "Universal"), a four-engined aircraft with a similar layout to the An-8, but with increased dimensions and a circular-section pressurised fuselage. Early in the design process the choice of engines was between the Kuznetsov NK-4 and the Ivchenko AI-20, and despite superior performance the Kuznetsov NK-4 was eliminated and the Ivchenko AI-20 selected, partly due to the Central Committee of the Communist Party of Ukraine, which wanted as many as possible produced in Ukraine, where the Ivchenko factory was.

The first prototype flew on 7 March 1957, revealing poor directional stability which led to a taller vertical fin, and later to hexagonal auxiliary fins at the tips of the tailplane. Entering production at Zavod (factory) No.64, Voronezh in 1957, the initial three aircraft were delivered with Kuznetsov NK-4 engines, due to non-availability of the Ivchenko AI-20 engines. From 1958, production aircraft were delivered with the Ivchenko AI-20A engines which boasted a longer service life and performance comparable to the Kuznetsov engines. The new aircraft was displayed to the public for the first time in July 1957; the design was approved for mass production after testing was completed in June 1959. Aeroflot began operations with the An-10 from 22 July 1959 on the Moscow – Simferopol route.

Configured with 85 seats, the cabin was spacious and well-appointed with comfortable seats widely spaced, giving plenty of legroom, but due to the low cabin floor and wide diameter, there was much unusable space which limited baggage and cargo volume. The inefficient use of cabin volume contributed greatly to the low payload/TOW ratio which was much lower than that of the contemporary Ilyushin Il-18, but which was still higher than the Tupolev Tu-104. A later production version, the An-10A, addressed some of the efficiency concerns by increasing the number of seats from 85 to 89 and 100 (in the two versions of the An-10A), then to 117–118 and finally 132 through reducing seat pitch and changing the cabin layout. Powered by Ivchenko AI-20K engines the An-10A demonstrated superior performance and an increased maximum payload of 14.5 Tonnes (31,970 lb). The auxiliary endplate fins eventually gave way to improved splayed ventral fins under the rear fuselage. The directional stability was better and the new ventral fins also improved longitudinal stability at high g and on landing approach, as well as delaying the onset of Mach buffet to M0.702. Due to being placed in an area of flow separation, the new ventral fins caused unpleasant vibrations. Following results of flight tests and at least two fatal crashes, an effective tailplane deicing system was retrofitted to all remaining aircraft.

== Operational history ==
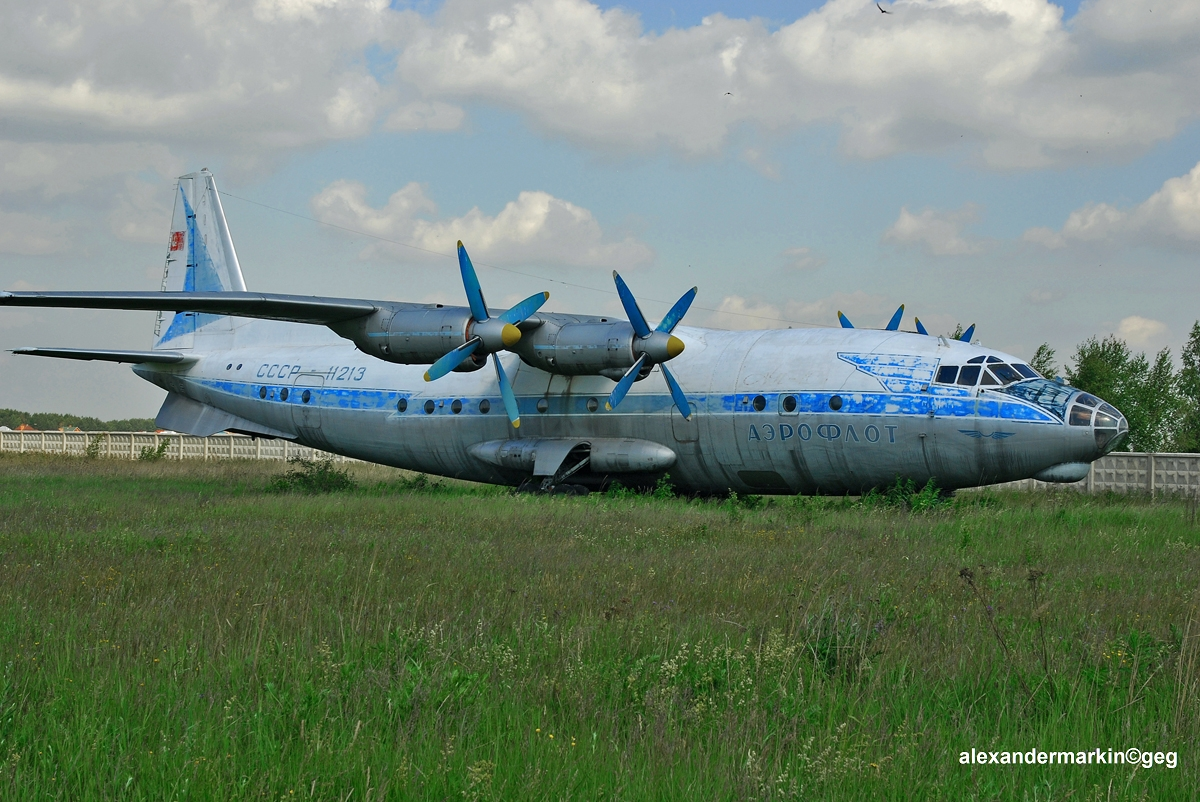
Antonov An-10 at Central Air Force Museum

A total of 104 aircraft were built, including the prototype and static test airframes, entering service with the Ukrainian Civil Aviation Directorate of Aeroflot from 27 April 1959, proving popular due to large cargo volume (when fitted with reduced seating) and excellent field performance, making the aircraft suitable for use on small undeveloped airfields. The Antonov Bureau simultaneously developed and produced the Antonov An-8 medium military transport, the An-10 civil airliner and military paratroop transport, as well as the Antonov An-12 military cargo transport.

On 16 November 1959 CCCP-11167 crashed on final approach near Lviv due to icing.

On 22 April 1962 an An-10A piloted by A. Mitronin achieved a world record 500 km closed loop speed record averaging 730.6 kilometres per hour (454.0 mph).

On 26 February 1960, at Lviv Danylo Halytskyi International Airport, CCCP-11180 crashed due to reduced longitudinal stability and control authority caused by icing of the tailplane.

Military use of the An-10 was fairly extensive with 45 An-10TS built for the VTA, 16 flown exclusively by military units and the remaining 38 loaned to the Ministry of Civil Aviation, as well as the flyable aircraft remaining after withdrawal from Aeroflot service.

On 18 May 1972, while descending to Kharkiv International Airport an An-10 crashed, killing eight crew and 113 passengers. An investigation revealed fatigue cracking of the wing centre section stringers on many of the remaining aircraft. Following this accident, Aeroflot ceased operating the An-10.

After withdrawal from Aeroflot service on 27 August 1972, 25 An-10A aircraft which were in good condition were transferred to the VVS (Soviet Air Force) and other MAP (Ministry of Aircraft Production) units, until retired by 1974. The type's very last flight was completed by 1983.

== Operators ==
Soviet Union

- Aeroflot
- Soviet Air Force

== Variants ==
- Izdeliye U – The in-house designation of the four-engined passenger aircraft derived from the Izdeliye N An-8 project.
- An-10 – The designation of the prototype and initial production versions fitted with Kuznetsov NK-4 or Ivchenko AI-20A engines.
- An-10A – Production aircraft from December 1959 with increased seating, decreased empty weight/increased payload and Ivchenko AI-20K engines.
- An-10AS – Several aircraft modified for small package cargo transport with no seats.
- An-10B (first use of designation) – Version with improved avionics and seating for 118 passengers.
- An-10B (second use of designation) – An An-10A configured to carry 132 passengers. This was achieved by increasing the number of seats in a row to seven and adding two more rows in the middle cabin. Seats in the front and middle sections reclined for passenger comfort. The tail was also modified. Extra fuel tanks were also fitted to increase range. One aircraft built in 1962.
- An-10D – Projected version with range increased to 3,650 km (2,268 mi) with fuel tanks in the wing torsion box and seating for 124 passengers. The engines were moved 1 m (3 ft) outward and fiberglass propeller blades fitted to reduce noise and increase efficiency. Production of a prototype was planned for 1960.
- An-10KP – (Komandny Punkt – command post) A single aircraft (CCCP-11854) modified as an airborne command post for use at Sperenberg Airfield, near Berlin in the DDR.
- An-10TS – (Transport/Sanitarny – transport/ambulance) 45 aircraft ordered for the VTA (Voyenno-Transportnaya Aviatsiya – transport air arm), with 38 loaned to the Ministry of Civil Aviation.
- An-10V (later An-16) – An-10A lengthened by 6 m (20 ft) and wider fuselage to carry 174 passengers at a range of 1,600 km (990 mi) or 128 passengers at a range of 3,000 km (1,900 mi). Development began in 1963, but the aircraft was never built.
- An-16 – An-10 lengthened by 3 m (9.8 ft) to carry 130 passengers. Development began in 1957, but following an order for another variant, the aircraft was never built.

== Accidents and incidents ==
Over its life, the An-10 experienced 15 accidents, with 373 fatalities. The An-10 carried more than 35 million passengers and 1.2 million tons of cargo.

- On 29 April 1958, an An-10 (CCCP-Л7256) of MAP Voronezh AZ crashed at Pridacha Airport during a test flight following double engine failure, killing one of five crew. Shortly after takeoff, engine number one overheated and failed due to prolonged operation in takeoff mode; the engine control system reduced power to engine number four to avoid asymmetric thrust. Engine number three later overheated and failed and power was reduced to engine number two. With only two engines, the aircraft could not maintain altitude and the crew decided to make a gear-down forced landing in a field, but the aircraft crashed during the attempt.
- On 16 November 1959, Aeroflot Flight 315, an An-10 (CCCP-11167), entered a nosedive and crashed near Snilow Airport due to tail icing, killing all 40 on board. It was found that the An-10 was vulnerable in icing conditions.
- On 26 February 1960, Aeroflot Flight 315, an An-10A (CCCP-11180), entered a nosedive while on approach to Snilow Airport due to tail icing. Although the crew were able to regain control, the aircraft went into another nosedive and crashed, killing 32 of 33 on board. In the wake of this accident and the crash of An-10 CCCP-11167 in 1959, ice protection systems for the stabilizer were improved and pilots could not select more than 15 degrees of flaps in known icing conditions.
- On 27 January 1962, an Aeroflot An-10 (CCCP-11148) crashed near Baratayevka Airport during a test flight after the number four propeller reversed, killing 13 of 14 on board.
- On 28 July 1962, Aeroflot Flight 415, an An-10A (CCCP-11186), struck a mountain 13 mi southeast of Adler/Sochi Airport while on approach due to ATC errors, killing all 81 on board.
- On 8 February 1963, an Aeroflot An-10A (CCCP-11193) stalled and crashed near Syktyvkar during a training flight following triple engine failure due to ice ingestion, killing the seven crew.
- On 8 August 1968, an Aeroflot An-10A (CCCP-11172) crashed on landing at Mirny Airport after the left main landing gear fell off while the landing gear was lowered; there were no casualties.
- On 12 October 1969, an Aeroflot An-10 (CCCP-11169) ran into a trench after landing on a snow-covered runway at Mirny Airport; no casualties.
- On 15 May 1970, an Aeroflot An-10 (CCCP-11149) lost control and crashed at Kishinev (now Chișinău) while performing a two-engined go-around during a training flight, killing the 11 crew.
- On 8 August 1970, Aeroflot Flight 888, an An-10A (CCCP-11188), force-landed in a field 24 mi north of Kishinev Airport following an in-flight fire caused by an uncontained engine failure, killing one of 114 on board.
- On 31 March 1971, Aeroflot Flight 1969, an An-10 (CCCP-11145), crashed on approach to Voroshilovgrad (now Luhansk) following an unexplained wing separation, killing all 65 on board.
- On 12 October 1971, an Aeroflot An-10 (CCCP-11137), suffered landing gear collapse on landing at Kishinev; no casualties.
- In February 1972, an Aeroflot An-10 (CCCP-11142) burned out in a fire at ARZ-412 at Rostov Airport.
- On 30 April 1972, an Aeroflot An-10 (CCCP-11159) suffered severe damage after a heavy landing at Vnukovo Airport; no casualties.
- On 18 May 1972, Aeroflot Flight 1491, an An-10A (CCCP-11215), crashed on approach to Kharkov Airport after both wings separated due to fatigue failure in the center wing panel, killing all 122 on board. Aeroflot retired the An-10 following this accident, which effectively retired the type.

== Specifications (An-10A) ==
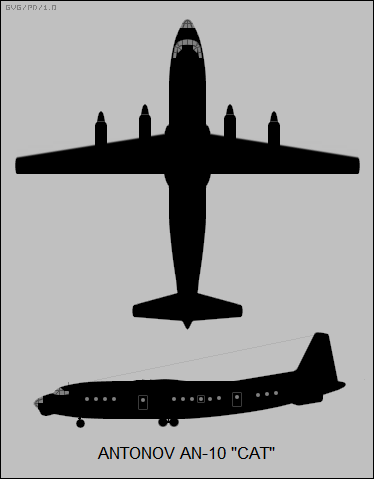

Data from Soviet Transport Aircraft since 1945, Jane's all the World's Aircraft 1970–71

General characteristics

- Crew: 4 flight crew +cabin crew
- Capacity: 100 or 130 pax / 14,500 kg (32,000 lb)
- Length: 34 m (111 ft 7 in)
- Wingspan: 38 m (124 ft 8 in)
- Height: 9.83 m (32 ft 3 in)
- Wing area: 120 m^{2} (1,300 sq ft)
- Volume: 222 m^{3} (7,800 cu ft) cabin volume
- Underfloor hold volume: 32 m^{3} (1,100 cu ft)
- Max takeoff weight: 55,100 kg (121,475 lb)
- Fuel capacity: 13,000 L (3,400 US gal; 2,900 imp gal) (10,250 kg (22,600 lb))
- Powerplant: 4 × Ivchenko AI-20K turboprop engines, 3,000 kW (4,000 hp) each (equivalent)
- Propellers: 4-bladed AV-68 reversible-pitch constant-speed propellers, 4.5 m (14 ft 9 in) diameter

Performance

- Maximum speed: 715 km/h (444 mph, 386 kn)
- Cruise speed: 680 km/h (420 mph, 370 kn) maximum at 10,000 m (33,000 ft)
- Economical cruise speed: 630 km/h (390 mph; 340 kn) at 10,000 m (33,000 ft)
- Take-off speed: 190–210 km/h (120–130 mph; 100–110 kn)
- Range: 1,200 km (750 mi, 650 nmi) with max payload + 60 minutes reserve fuel

4,075 km (2,532 mi) with max fuel 8,440 kg (18,610 lb) payload and no reserves

- Service ceiling: 10,200 m (33,500 ft)
- Wing loading: 430 kg/m^{2} (88 lb/sq ft)
- Power/mass: 4.4 kg/kW (7.2 lb/hp)
- Landing run: 500–650 m (1,640–2,130 ft) with reverse pitch

== See also ==
Related development

- Antonov An-12

Aircraft of comparable role, configuration, and era

- Bristol Britannia
- Ilyushin Il-18
- Lockheed L-100 Hercules
- Vickers Vanguard

Related lists

- List of airliners
