= Ilyushin Il-20M =

Soviet surveillance aircraft developed in the late 1960s and early 1970s

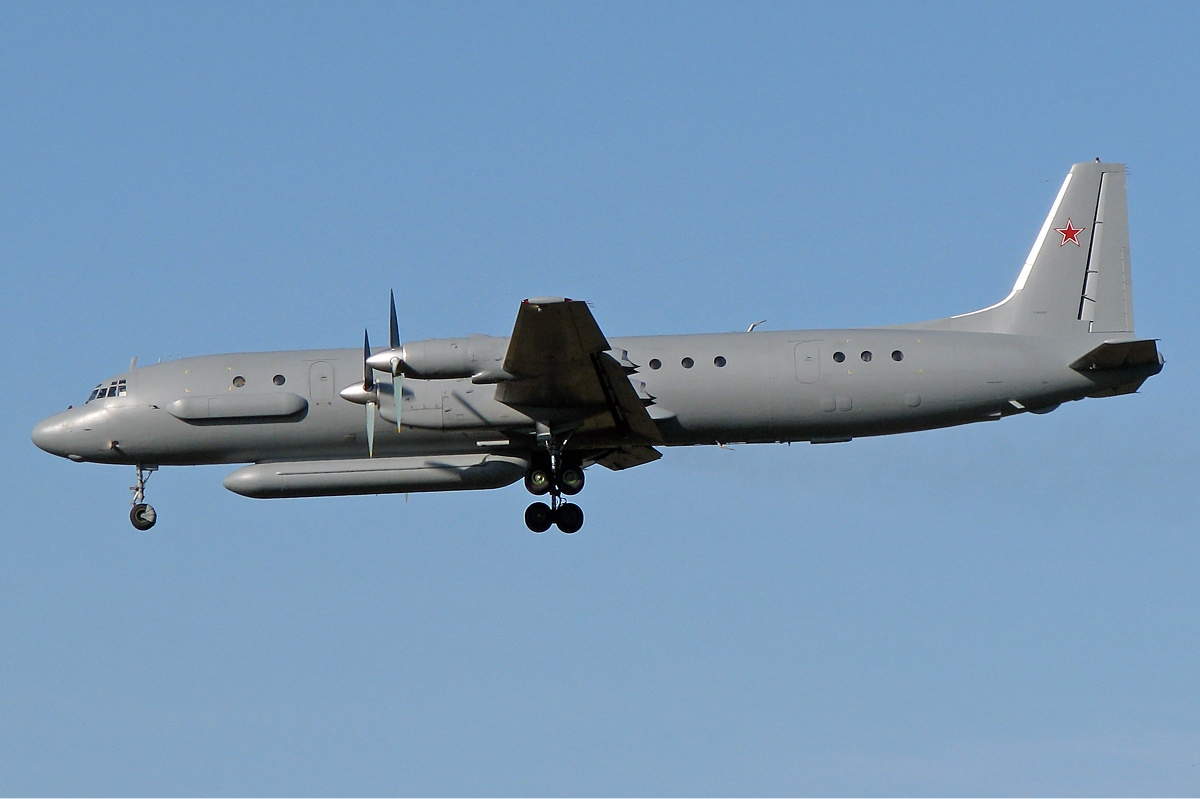
- An Il-20M flying over Chkalovsky air base, 2009

General information
- Type: Surveillance aircraft
- National origin: Soviet Union
- Manufacturer: Ilyushin
- Status: In service
- Number built: 19

History
- Manufactured: 1968–1976
- Introduction date: 1969
- First flight: 21 March 1968
- Developed from: Ilyushin Il-18

The Ilyushin Il-20M (Russian: Ильюшин Ил-20М, NATO reporting name: "Coot-A") is a COMINT/ELINT surveillance-reconnaissance aircraft, powered by four turboprop engines. It is a development of the Ilyushin Il-18. It was first observed by NATO in 1978.

== History ==
The first flight took place on 21 March 1968, and the test cycle was completed in 1969.

Until 1974, the Il-20 (including its modifications) was manufactured at the Moscow State Aircraft Plant No. 30 “Znamya Truda” (Russian lit. 'Flag of Labour'). The aircraft was developed from IL-18D.

Il-20s were not used by any air reconnaissance or other units of the USSR Armed Forces. Instead, Il-20s were directly attached to the headquarters of the fleet or district, i.e. were considered in the parts of central control. Periodically, the planes performed reconnaissance flights (for example, for reconnaissance along the border strip and the state border), participated in various exercises. Later, as a result of the physical and moral aging of the intelligence apparatus, the planes that remained in service were converted into transport-passenger ones and were used to transport cargo and personnel.

Little is known about the operation and performance of avionics. Il-20M aircraft were frequently observed over European waters during the Cold War.

== Technology ==
The aircraft is equipped with special electronic intelligence (ELINT) and communications intelligence (COMINT) equipment. The cigar-shaped case under the fuselage contains the Igla-1 - Side looking airborne radar (SLAR). This is used for radar imaging and mapping purposes. A large A-87P camera is housed in another housing on the side of the fuselage. The aircraft houses the Vischnia, SRS-4 Romb and Kwadrat-2 ELINT systems. There are various antennas on the fuselage for collecting the electronic data. The two large antennas on the top of the fuselage are used for satellite communication. The Il-20M can thus transmit information to the ground command in near real time.

== Description ==
A radio-technical reconnaissance station and aerial photography cameras are installed in front of the passenger cabin. The antenna of the radar station is located in the under-fuselage nacelle. The Il-20 is also equipped with a station for detailed radio-technical reconnaissance and radio interception equipment. In the middle and front part of the passenger cabin there are seats for six operators of radio technical systems. The IL-20 differs from the original aircraft in its lower flying weight, powerful Ivchenko AI-20 engine and increased flight range of up to 5,400 km.

The chief of the BRK (on-board intelligence complex) heads the camera crew. The flight crew consists of five people. There is a lounge with simple double passenger seats, a wardrobe, a buffet and a toilet in the tail of the aircraft.

== Incidents ==
In October 2013, Russia used the Il-20M over the Black Sea to fly reconnaissance missions along the Turkish coast. When the machine was spotted, two F-16 fighter planes took off on the Turkish side to intercept the scout. The machine ultimately headed for Bulgarian airspace and the pursuit was aborted.

This was repeated on April 13, 2014. Here the Il-20M, coming from Romania and flying east, again flew 15 to 20 nautical miles along the Turkish Black Sea coast before being identified and intercepted by four Turkish F-16s.

On October 22, 2014, according to the Estonian military, an Il-20M entered Estonian airspace and stayed in it for a short period of time. The aircraft was identified and escorted by aircraft from the Portuguese, Belgian and Swedish Air Forces. The Russian Ministry of Defense denied a violation of Estonian airspace.

The Il-20M was involved in the deployment of the Russian Air Force in Syria in 2015. It was later supplemented by the Tu-214R.

According to a tweet by the German Air Force, on November 28, 2022, an alert group consisting of two Eurofighter Typhoon fighter planes identified an Il-20M. The machine flew without a transponder code in international airspace between the Russian exclave of Kaliningrad Oblast and the Russian mainland. The German alarm squad started from Ämari Air Base in Estonia.

According to another tweet, on January 27, 2023, a German Air Force alarm squad consisting of two Eurofighter Typhoon fighter planes identified and accompanied an Il-20M (RF-93611) over the Baltic Sea. The alarm squad belonged to the Tactical Air Force Squadron 73 "Steinhoff" at the Rostock-Laage air base, where they then returned.

On December 9, 2024, two F-35s intercepted an IL-20 Coot-A, according to a news release from the Dutch Ministry of Defense. The F-35s remotely escorted the spy plane over international waters to the border of NATO's area of responsibility.

On March 27, 2025, NATO’s Combined Air Operations Centre (CAOC) registered unusual activity in the airspace over Kaliningrad. Twelve minutes after identifying the threat, two Eurofighters stationed at the Rostock-Laage Air Base launched on a quick reaction alert to intercept the suspected Russian aircraft, which was flying without any visible identification markings. At that time, the aircraft was already on a course toward German NATO airspace. The Eurofighter pilots escorted the Russian reconnaissance plane, which was identified as a surveillance aircraft, for several kilometers east of the island of Rügen before completing their mission and returning to base.

On August 20, 2025, NORAD reported that a single IL-20 Coot flew inside the Alaskan defense zone for approximately two hours and four minutes. The aircraft did not enter Canadian or U.S. air space. NORAD dispatched an E-3 Sentry early warning and control aircraft, a KC-135 aerial refueler and two F-16 Fighting Falcons to intercept, track and monitor the IL-20.

On September 21, 2025, two Eurofighter Typhoon fighter jets from Germany and two Gripen fighter jets from Sweden were scrambled to intercept and track a Russian IL-20 surveillance plane that was flying unidentified over the South Baltic Sea. The Russian plane had been flying without providing a flight path or radio contact that could signal its presence, according to Swedish and German air force officials.

On October 28, 30 and 31, 2025, IL-20s entered the international airspace over the Baltic Sea with their transponders switched off and without having transmitted a flight plan. Polish MiG-29 fighters intercepted one of them on October 31 and escorted it back.

== Further development ==
The Ilyushin Il-22PP is a recent development of the Ilyushin Il-22M, which Russia claims is capable of jamming modern AWACS aircraft and MIM-104 Patriot while blocking analogous jamming measures. As of November 2016, there are three Il-22PP.

== Technical data ==
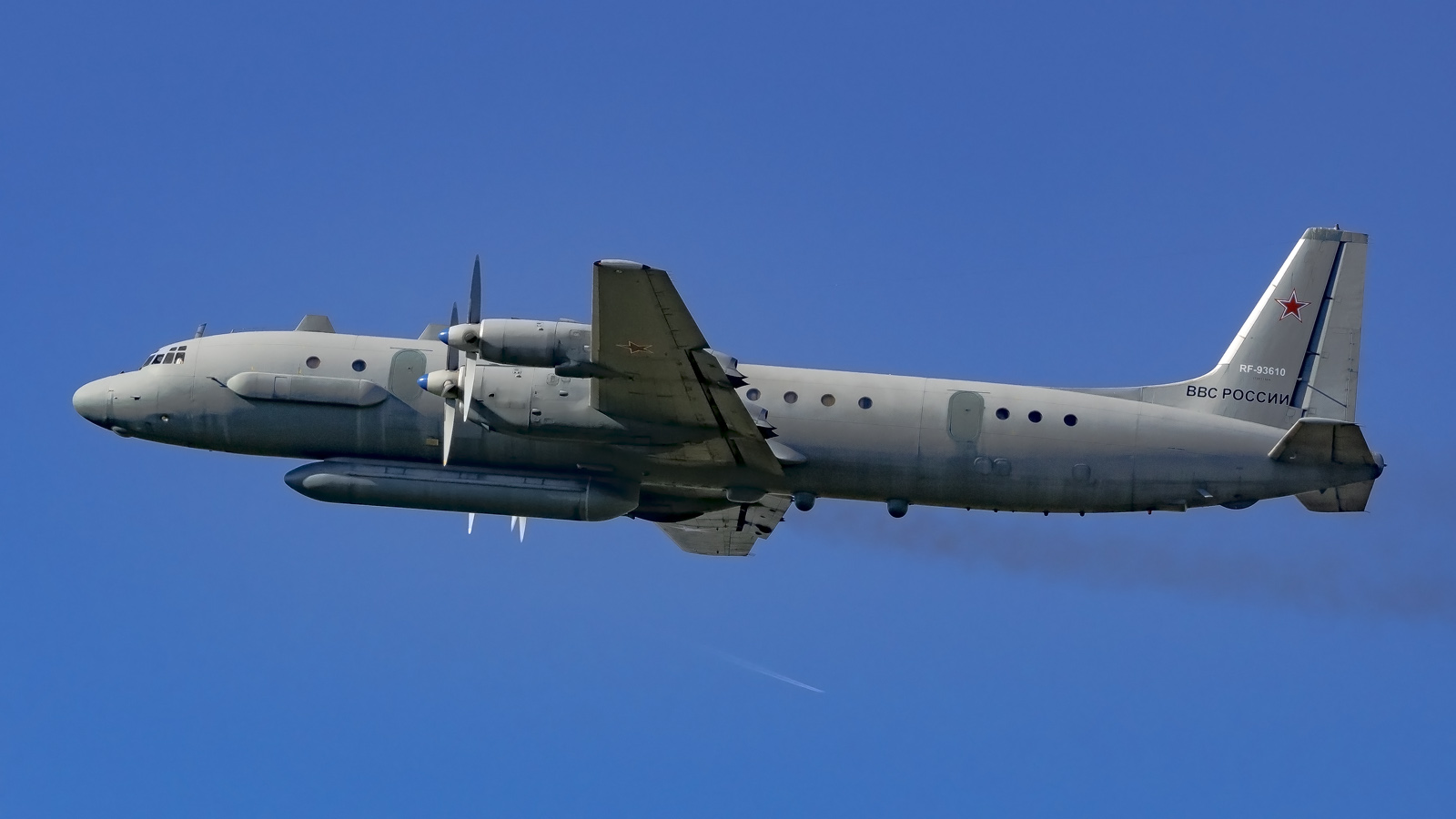
The Il-20M RF-93610 was shot down by a Syrian S-200 system on September 17, 2018

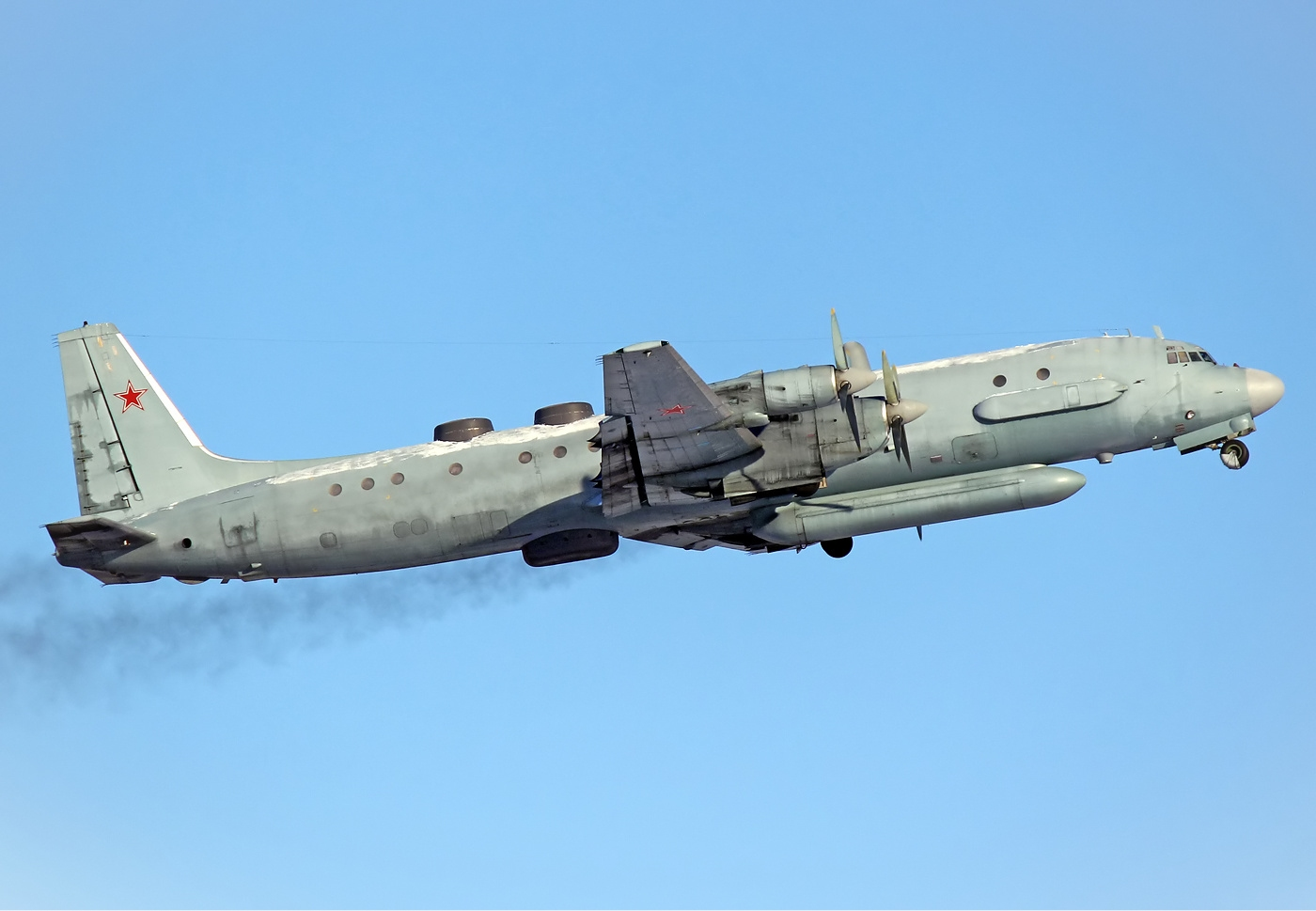
Il-20M

General characteristics

- Crew: 13
- Capacity: 13,500 kg (29,800 lb)
- Length: 35.9 m (117 ft 9 in)
- Wingspan: 37.42 m (122 ft 9 in)
- Height: 10.17 m (33 ft 4 in)
- Wing area: 140.6 m^{2} (1,513 sq ft)
- Aspect ratio: 10
- Empty weight: 33,760 kg (74,428 lb)
- Max takeoff weight: 64,000 kg (141,096 lb)
- Sensors: SLAR, optical, infrared and electronic sensors
- Powerplant: 4 × AI-20M Turboprop, 3,169 kW (4,250 hp) each

Performance

- Maximum speed: 675 km/h (419 mph, 364 kn) at 8000m altitude
- Cruise speed: 620 km/h (390 mph, 330 kn)
- Range: 6,200 km (3,900 mi, 3,300 nmi)
- Service ceiling: 10,000 m (33,000 ft)

== Accidents ==
On September 17, 2018, at around 11 p.m. local time, the command of Russian forces in Syria lost contact with an Il-20M over the eastern Mediterranean Sea. It had been accidentally shot down by Syrian air defenses while Israeli F-16s were operating over Syria and attacking ground targets. None of the 15 people on board survived. Russia initially accused Israel of using the Il-20M as cover for their F-16s. Israel stated that the Israeli planes had already returned to Israeli airspace at the time of the shooting-down. Russian President Vladimir Putin spoke of a chain of unfortunate circumstances, defusing the accusations against the Israeli Air Force.
