= Kuznetsov NK-4 =

1950s Soviet/Russian turboprop aircraft engine

NK-4
- Type: Turboprop
- National origin: Soviet Union
- Manufacturer: Kuznetsov Design Bureau
- First run: April 1956
- Major applications: Ilyushin Il-18

The Kuznetsov NK-4 is a turboprop engine, designed by the Kuznetsov Design Bureau.

== Development ==
Development of the NK-4 began on September 27, 1955 at the Kuznetsov Design Bureau. Factory tests were passed on April 17, 1956 and state tests were passed in 1957. At the time, the NK-4 was considered an economical and technologically advanced engine.

A modified version of the NK-4 that improved in terms of service life and efficiency, the NK-4A, passed factory tests in October 1957. State tests of the NK-4A were passed in June 1959.

== Applications ==
- Antonov An-10 (prototype)
- Ilyushin Il-18A

== Specifications (NK-4) ==
Data from Otechestvennaya aviatsionno-kosmicheskaya tekhnika - SAMARSKIY NTK

==== General characteristics ====
- Type: Turboprop engine
- Length: 2.77 m (9 ft 1 in)
- Diameter:
- Dry weight: 970 kg (2,140 lb) without propeller

==== Components ====
- Compressor:

==== Performance ====
- Maximum power output:
  - 2,944 kW (3,948 hp) at takeoff
  - 1,580 kW (2,120 hp) in cruise
- Overall pressure ratio: 7.9
- Turbine inlet temperature: 1,250 K (980 °C; 1,790 °F)
- Specific fuel consumption:
  - 0.333 kg/(kW⋅h) at takeoff
  - 0.285 kg/(kW⋅h) in cruise

== See also ==
Comparable engines

- Ivchenko AI-20

Related lists

- List of aircraft engines
