= Anikay Air =

Airline in Kyrgyzstan

IATA	ICAO	Call sign
-	AKF	ANIKAY
- Founded: 2003
- Ceased operations: 2007
- Hubs: Manas International Airport
- Fleet size: 1
- Headquarters: Bishkek, Kyrgyzstan

Anikay Air Company was a charter airline based in Bishkek in Kyrgyzstan. The airline president, Alfiya Galiaskarova, planned to establish Anikay Air as a major operator from Kyrgyzstan to CIS and the Middle East.

The airline was on the list of air carriers banned in the European Union.

== Fleet ==
The Anikay Air fleet included the following aircraft (at March 2008):

- 1 Boeing 737-200
