= Ivchenko AI-20 =

Soviet turboprop engine

AI-20
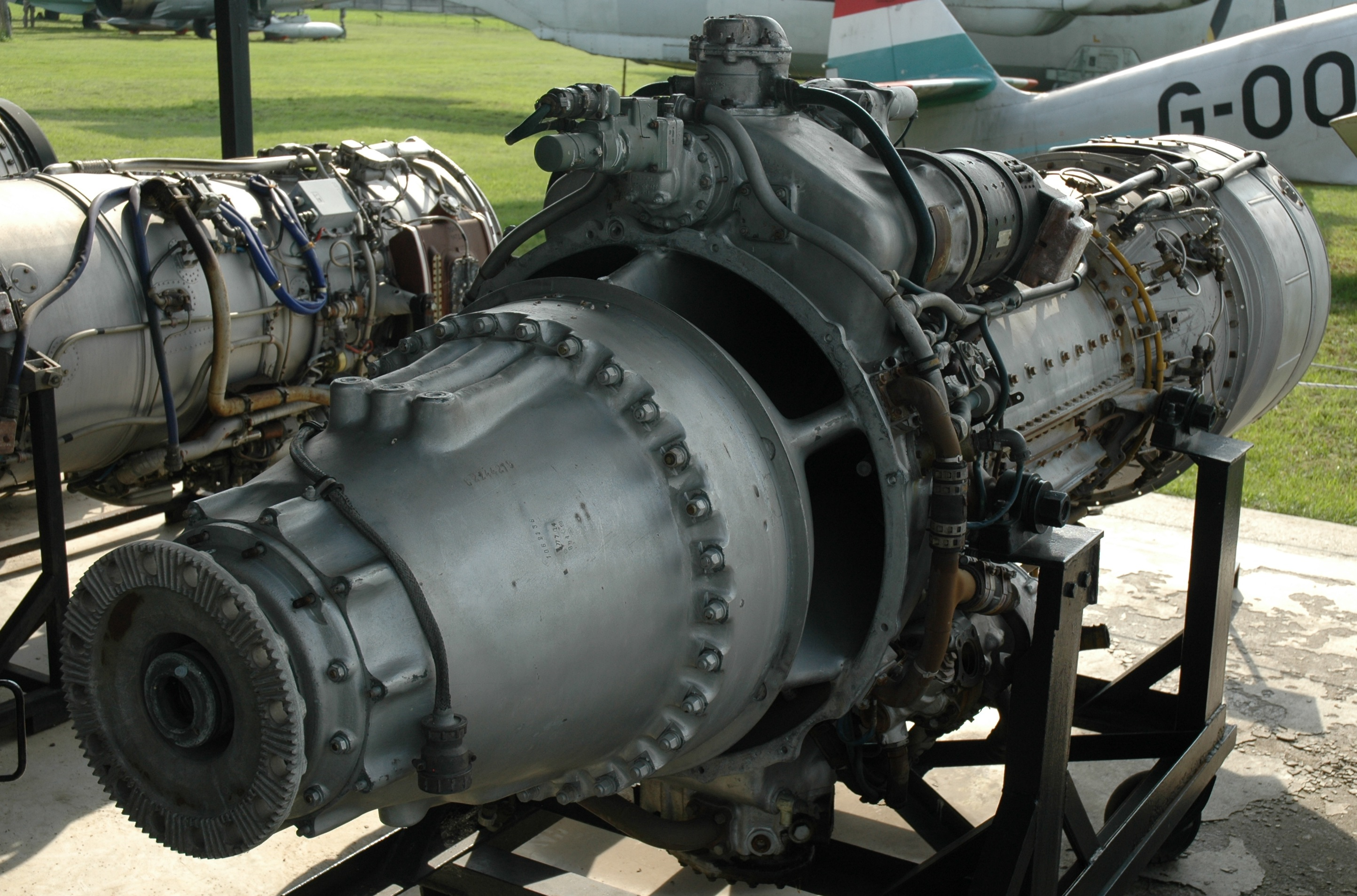
- Ivchenko AI-20M turboprop engine
- Type: Turboprop
- National origin: Soviet Union
- Manufacturer: Ivchenko/ZMKB Progress, PMZ (Perm), AI22 also in KMPO plant
- Major applications: Antonov An-10; Antonov An-12; Ilyushin Il-18

The Ivchenko AI-20 (Russian: Ивченко АИ-20) is a Soviet turboprop engine developed by the Ivchenko design bureau in the 1950s. It has been built in large numbers, serving as the powerplant for both the Antonov An-12 transport and the Ilyushin Il-18 airliner.

== Design and development ==
The AI-20 was the first gas turbine engine developed by the design bureau led by Oleksandr Heorhiiovych Ivchenko based at Zaporizhzhia, USSR, which had previously concentrated on small piston engines such as the Ivchenko AI-14 and AI-26 radials. It was designed as a prospective powerplant for the new, large Ilyushin Il-18 airliner and the Antonov An-10, to be powered by four turboprops, in competition with the Kuznetsov NK-4 engines. Both engines were tested on the preproduction batch of 20 Il-18s, but the Ivchenko engine was chosen for full production, possibly due to a crash caused by an inflight failure of an NK-4 engine, and possibly due to the desire for the engines of the Ukrainian An-10 to also be built in Ukraine.

The Il-18B was powered by four Ivchenko AI-20A Series 1 turboprops, each providing a takeoff power of 2,985 kW (4,000 shp) and sustained power of 2,090 kW (2,800 shp) at cruise altitude. Early Il-18A production had initially been fitted with Kuznetsov NK-4 engines, but they were soon exchanged for AI-20s. Later Il-18B production featured AI-20A Series 2 engines, with the same power ratings, but with technical improvements, thus older machines were updated with the Series 2 powerplants. The AI-20s drove four-bladed variable pitch reversible props with a diameter of 4.5 meters (14 feet 9 inches), featuring prominent propeller spinners, and hydraulic actuation for prop pitch. The engines were mounted above the wing and featured integrated fire extinguishers. The engines were started with electric motors, the power for the motors being provided by a ground cart.

The AI-20 is a single-shaft turboprop with a ten-stage axial compressor and a three-stage power turbine, and is designed to run at a constant speed. A big problem with early production engines was the poor reliability of the AI-20 engines, which had a time between overhauls (TBO) in the range of 600 to 750 hours. The AI-20K engine variant was finally introduced, with a TBO of 2,000 hours – unimpressive by modern standards, but a big improvement. One issue that was never addressed was noise; turboprops are relatively noisy and high noise levels were a problem for the passengers. As mentioned, the overhaul life of the engine was initially poor compared with contemporary Western engines, being reported as 600–750 hours in 1964, but was later improved by continuous development to 8,000 hours, with a service life of 22,000 hours in the AI-20D series 5M.

Serial production was carried out at Zaporizhzhia (Motor Sich) and at Perm Engine Plant (UEC-Perm Engines), USSR in 1958, also being built under licence in China as the WJ-6. About 14,000 AI-20s have been built in total.

== Variants ==
AI-20A series 1
Initial production variant for early version of IL-18 producing 2,985 kW (4,000 shp). TBO was 200–400 hrs.
AI-20A series 2
Improved production variant with same power ratings but technical improvements; older airplanes were updated with the Series 2 engines. TBO was (600–750 hrs)
AI-20K
Reliability and durability was addressed with this much improved variant. TBO went up to 2,000 hours. This became the standard production variant.
AI-20M
This variant was a significant improvement over the earlier engine variants in all respects. The AI-20M raised takeoff power from 2,985 kW (4,000 shp) to 3,169 kW (4,250 shp), improving takeoff performance under "hot and high" conditions and permitting higher takeoff weights. Higher continuous power ratings were also attained (2,700 shp) which made for more efficient cruise. Beyond these, the AI-20M also had good reliability, was lighter, and in particular featured much improved SFC.
AI-20D
This variant saw significant improvement in power output. Fuel economy was also marginally improved. AI-20D is also often referred to as AI-20D series 4. Power was uprated to 5,180 shp.
AI-20D series 5
This variant builds on the previous success of the series 4 variant. Most performance parameters remained the same with the only major improvement being in the area of reliability and durability. The TBO/Service life was improved to 6000 hrs / 20,000 hrs respectively.
AI-20D series 5M or AI-20DM
This is the final variant developed. The AI-20DM is essentially the same with the AI-20D series 5, the only difference being in the power setting. The AI-20DM is derated to 4,750 shp (take-off power) which allows the engine to have extended life and increased TBO. The Time before overhaul (TBO) is consequently increased to 8,000 hrs with a service life of 22,000 hrs.

== Applications ==
=== AI-20 ===
- Antonov An-8
- Antonov An-10
- Antonov An-12
- Antonov An-32
- Beriev Be-12
- Ilyushin Il-18
- Ilyushin Il-38
- Tupolev Tu-4 (KJ-1 AEWC)

=== WJ-6 ===
- Shaanxi Y-8
- Shaanxi Y-9
- Qing-6 (Chinese upgraded Be-6 airframe)
- AVIC AG600 amphibian
- Xi'an KJ-600 carrier onboard delivery

== Specifications (AI-20D series 5) ==
Data from Jane's All The World's Aircraft 1993–94, Motor Sich website, Aircraft engines of the World 1970

==== General characteristics ====
- Type: Single-shaft turboprop
- Length: 3,096 mm (121.9 in)
- Diameter: 450 mm (18 in) (intake casing)
- Width: 842 mm (33.1 in)
- Height: 1,180 mm (46 in)
- Dry weight: 1,040 kg (2,290 lb)

==== Components ====
- Compressor: 10-stage axial compressor with 4 bypass valves for starting and transient ratings
- Combustors: Annular with 10 burner cones
- Turbine: 3-stage axial flow
- Fuel type: Aviation Kerosene fuels such as JP-4
- Oil system: Pressure type feed, fully recirculating

==== Performance ====
- Maximum power output: 3,170 kW (4,250 shp) (equivalent) for take-off at 12,300 rpm at sea level / (2,900 kW (3,900 shp) + 2.35 kN (529 lbf))

- Max. cruise power: 2,600 kW (3,500 shp) (equivalent) at 630 km/h (390 mph; 340 kn) at 8,000 m (26,000 ft)

- Engine operating rpm: 12,300 rpm
- Engine ground idle: 10,400 rpm
- Overall pressure ratio: 7.6:1 (take-off) to 9.2:1 (cruise)
- Air mass flow: 20.7 kg/s (46 lb/s) at 12,300 rpm
- Turbine inlet temperature: TIT max. 1,170 K (900 °C) at sea level; JPT 833 K (560 °C)
- Specific fuel consumption:

- Take-off s.f.c.: 0.322 kg/kWh (0.529 lb/(hp⋅h))
- Cruise s.f.c.: 0.264 kg/kWh (0.434 lb/(hp⋅h))

- Power-to-weight ratio: 3.07 kW/kg (1.87 shp/lb) (equivalent take-off power)

== See also ==
Comparable engines

- Allison T56
- Bristol Proteus
- General Electric T64
- Pratt & Whitney Canada PW100
- Rolls-Royce Tyne

Related lists

- List of aircraft engines
