= Aeroflot Flight 1969 =

1971 aviation accident

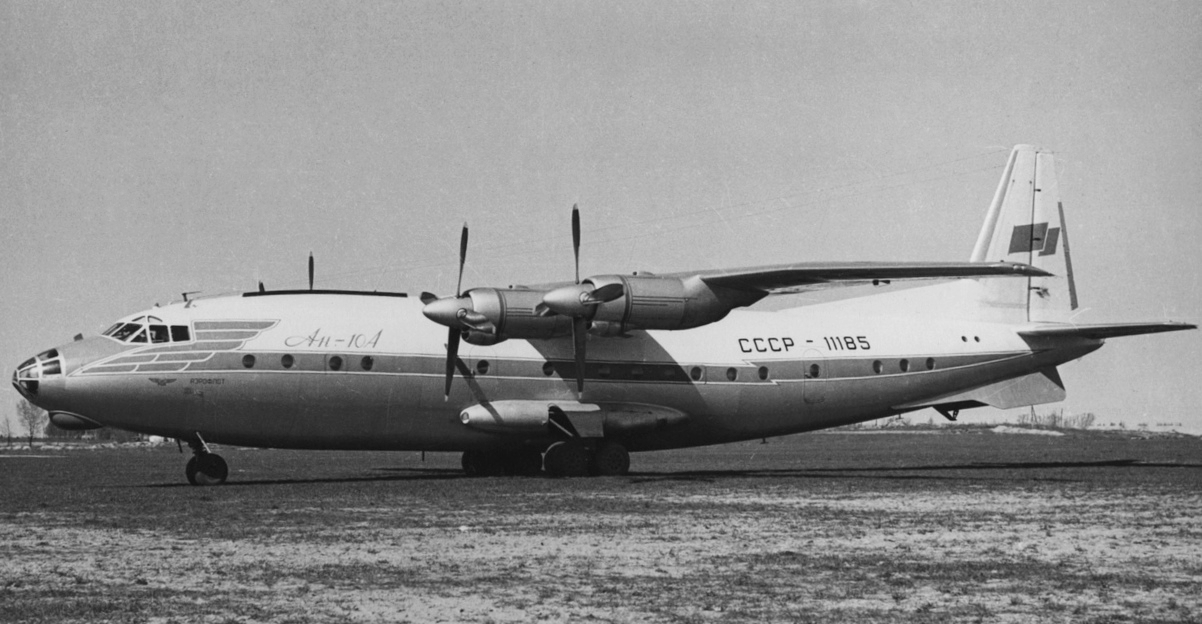
- An Antonov An-10 similar to the accident aircraft

Accident
- Date: 31 March 1971
- Summary: Structural failure of the right wing for reasons unknown, loss of control
- Site: 13 km southwest of Voroshilovgrad Airport

Aircraft
- Aircraft type: Antonov An-10
- Operator: Aeroflot
- Registration: CCCP-11145
- Flight origin: Kuybyshev Airport, Kuybyshev
- Stopover: Voroshilovgrad Airport, Voroshilovgrad
- Last stopover: Odesa International Airport, Odesa
- Occupants: 65
- Passengers: 57
- Crew: 8
- Fatalities: 65
- Survivors: 0

Aeroflot Flight 1969 was a passenger flight operated by an Antonov An-10 that crashed during the approach to Voroshilovgrad (now Luhansk) on 31 March 1971, resulting in the death of all 65 people on board. An investigation revealed that the Antonov's right wing failed structurally during the approach.

== Accident ==
Flight 1969 was a scheduled domestic flight from Kurumoch to Luhansk. At 11:13 local time the An-10 departed Kurumoch International Airport and climbed to a cruising altitude of 7,800 metres (25,600 ft). After passing a waypoint at Rostov the crew was instructed by air traffic control (ATC) to descend to an altitude of 5,700 m (18,700 ft). Shortly afterwards the crew received a report of weather conditions at the destination airport: solid clouds with a base of 600 metres (2,000 ft), visibility 10 kilometres (6.2 mi; 5.4 nmi), wind 50 degrees at 8 metres per second (16 kn; 29 km/h; 18 mph) with gusts up to 12 metres per second (23 kn; 43 km/h; 27 mph).

At 12:58:46 the crew reported an altitude of 1,200 metres (3,900 ft) and were given permission to continue their descent to 600 metres (2,000 ft). The crew's last transmission was at 12:58:50 when they reported they were continuing to descend. Before the An-10 reached 600 metres, approximately 13 square metres (140 sq ft) of the right wing including an aileron, separated from the rest of the aircraft severing hydraulic lines during the process. Part of the detached wing section struck the right horizontal stabilizer, damaging its structure while tearing off part of it and its elevator. The aircraft immediately yawed right and entered a steep bank also to the right. As the Antonov plummeted towards the ground both right engines lost oil pressure, causing their propellers to go into fine pitch, inducing both of them to rotate at very high rpm. At 12:59:30 the aircraft struck the ground in a 60 degree pitch down, 50 degree bank right attitude, killing all 69 people on board.

== Aircraft ==
The Antonov An-10 involved was serial number 8400701 and registered as CCCP-11145 to Aeroflot. The construction of the airliner was completed on 31 December 1958 and it had sustained a total of 14,337 flight hours and 9,081 takeoff and landing cycles at the time of the crash.

== Investigation ==
Investigators discovered that a riveted seam of the right wing nine ribs wide had separated in flight due to excessive shear loads. The investigators focused on two scenarios that could have led to the accident. The first was that the wing fractured due to over pressurization. It was theorized that if the vent outlet of the air bleed anti ice system were blocked by ice build up, too much pressure could cause a riveted seam to split open. Static testing with partially and completely blocked outlets showed that the pressure build up was negligible, due mostly to the systems design having numerous other paths for the bleed air to escape. The second synopsis was based on weakness of the joint due to a defect and/or fatigue cracks near the riveted seam. Testing of similar structures under laboratory conditions were performed but no weakening of the wing panel was found. Investigators failed to find the root cause of the wing panel failure and an official cause of the accident was never established.

== See also ==
- Aeroflot accidents and incidents
