= Aeroflot Flight 315 (1960) =

1960 aviation accident

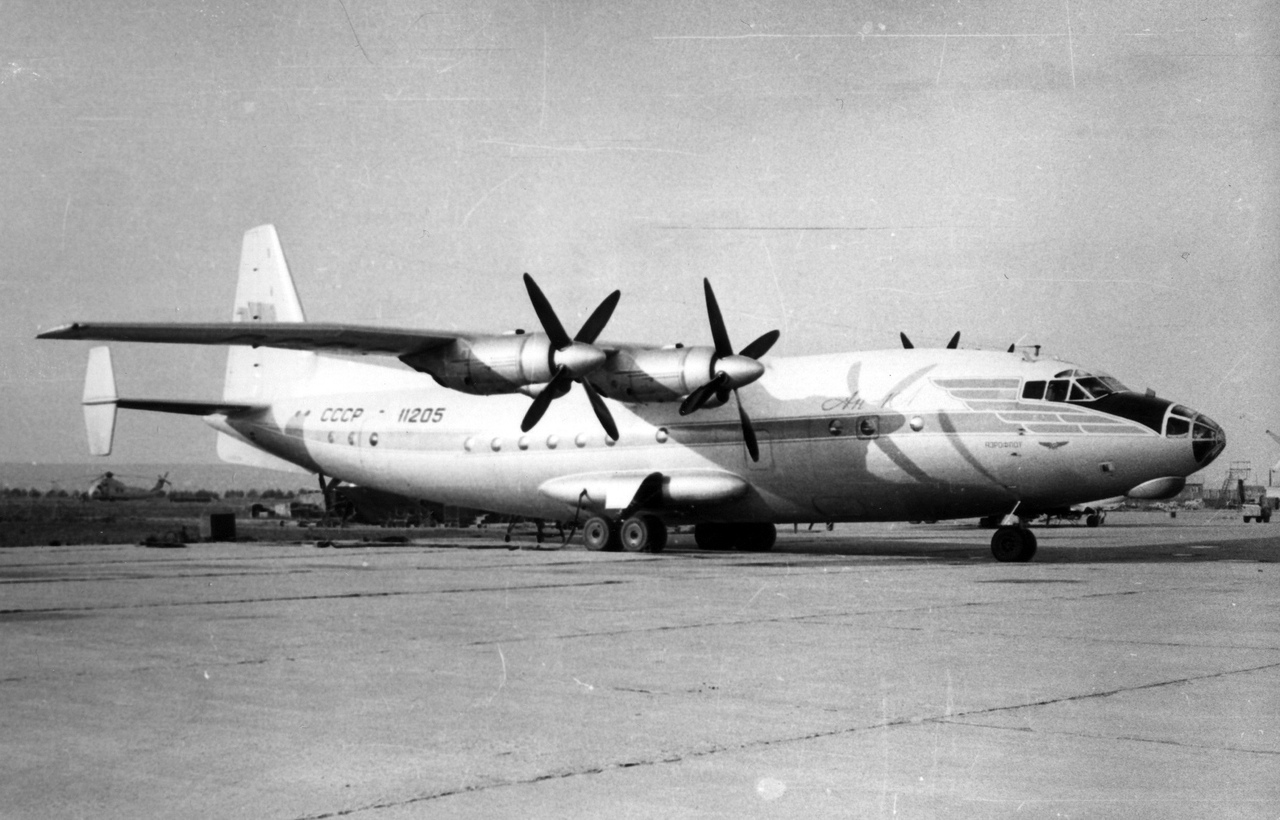
- An Antonov An-10 similar to the accident aircraft

Accident
- Date: 26 February 1960
- Summary: Tail icing, loss of control
- Site: near Snilow Airport

Aircraft
- Aircraft type: Antonov An-10A
- Operator: Aeroflot
- Registration: CCCP-11180
- Flight origin: Vnukovo International Airport, Moscow, USSR
- Stopover: Snilow Airport, Lviv, Ukraine
- Destination: Kyiv-Zhuliany Airport, Kyiv, Ukraine
- Occupants: 33
- Passengers: 25
- Crew: 8
- Fatalities: 32
- Survivors: 1

Aeroflot Flight 315 was a scheduled passenger flight from Vnukovo International Airport in Moscow, Soviet Union, to Kyiv-Zhuliany Airport in Kyiv, Ukraine, with a stopover at Lviv Airport in Lviv, Ukraine. On 26 February 1960, the Antonov An-10 flying this route crashed short of the airport runway while on final approach. 24 passengers and eight crew members were killed, one passenger survived. The Air Accident Investigation Commission concluded that the cause of the accident was a combination of a design flaw and tail icing.

== Accident ==
Flight 315 departed Vnukovo Airport at 14:38 (2:38 PM) Moscow time, and was cleared to climb to 7,000 meters (aprox 22,960 ft). At 16:35 (4:35 PM), as the airliner approached Lviv, the crew received clearance to descend to 4,000 meters (13,100 ft). Weather was reported as a cloud base of 150-200 meters(about 490-650 ft) in icing conditions with visibility at three km. The descent was normal and the pilot reported reaching the marker beacon at an altitude of 200 meters(650 ft), the flight was then cleared to land. When the aircraft penetrated the cloud base, the crew switched to visual flight rules (VFR). While descending through 95 meters (310 ft), the flaps were set to 45 degrees and the Antonov began a rapid pitch down. The crew briefly regained control, but the nose pitched down again and at 16:57(4:57 PM) impacted the ground 1,400 meters (around 4600 ft) short of the runway, with a pitch down attitude of 20-25 degrees.

== Aircraft ==
Construction of the An-10 involved, serial number 9401801-18-01, was completed at the Voronezh aircraft factory on 24 January 1960, and it was transferred to the civil air fleet. At the time of the accident, the aircraft had sustained a total of only 109 flight hours.

== Investigation ==
Because the aircraft was in operation for only six days after release from the factory, the Air Accident Investigation Commission decided it was unlikely that mechanical failure was the root cause of the accident. The evidence gathered from the investigation of Flight 315 on November 16th 1959 three months earlier was further scrutinized. Testing eventually revealed that icing of the horizontal stabilizer created a supercritical angle of attack, that caused a sudden pitch down of the aircraft when the flaps are lowered to the maximum setting of 45 degrees. A contributing factor was the speed when the flaps were deployed. 35 degrees in eight seconds was deemed disproportionally rapid. To abate this concern, ice protection systems for the stabilizer were improved, and selection of flaps beyond 15 degrees in known icing conditions was not allowed.

== See also ==
- Aeroflot accidents and incidents
- Aeroflot accidents and incidents in the 1960s
