= Aeroflot Flight 315 (1959) =

Aviation accident

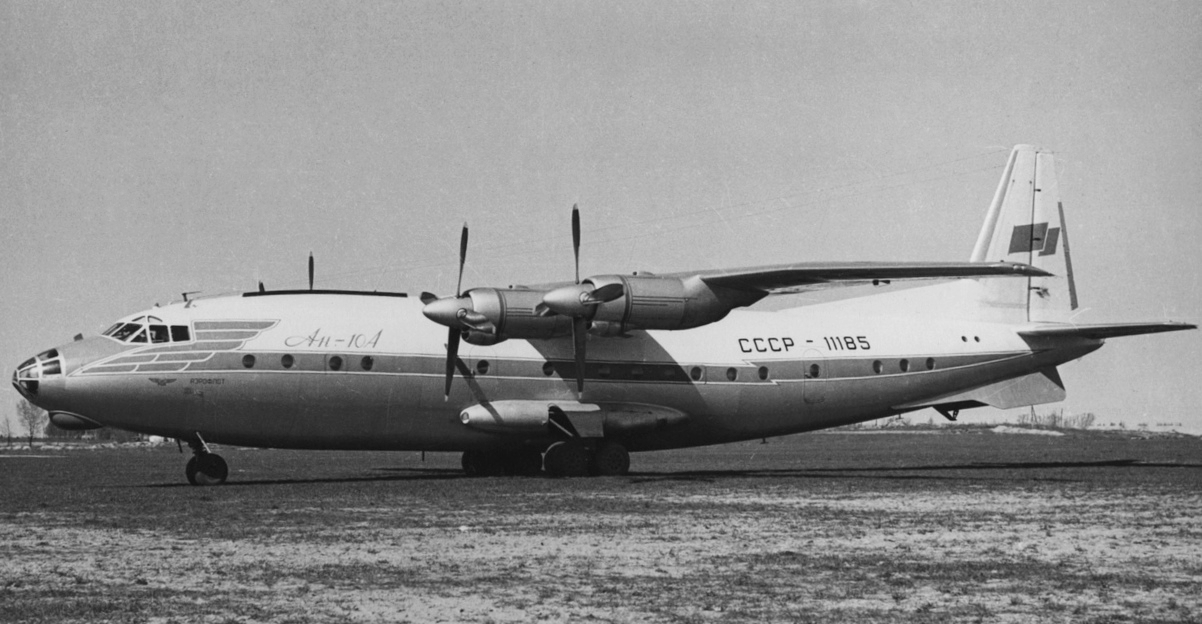
- An Antonov An-10 similar to the accident aircraft

Accident
- Date: 16 November 1959
- Summary: Icing, loss of control
- Site: Near Lviv Airport

Aircraft
- Aircraft type: Antonov An-10
- Operator: Aeroflot
- Registration: CCCP-11167
- Flight origin: Vnukovo Airport, Moscow, USSR
- Destination: Lviv Airport, Lviv, Ukraine
- Passengers: 32
- Crew: 8
- Fatalities: 40
- Survivors: 0

Aeroflot Flight 315 was a scheduled passenger flight from Vnukovo International Airport in Moscow, Soviet Union, to Lviv Airport in Lviv, Ukraine. On 16 November 1959, the Antonov An-10 flying this route crashed short of the airport runway while on final approach. All 32 passengers and eight crew members were killed. The Air Accident Investigation Commission concluded the cause of the accident was a combination of design flaw and icing.

== Accident ==
Flight 315 departed Vnukovo Airport at 16:48 Moscow time, and was cleared to climb to 7,000 meters. As the airliner approached Lviv, the weather was reported as temperature -1 degree C, humidity 97% with visibility at three km and the possibility of icing conditions. The descent was normal and the pilot reported reaching the outer marker at an altitude of 200 meters. Before reaching the inner marker, the aircraft descended out of the clouds and the crew switched to visual flight rules (VFR). At 19:06 while descending through 110 meters, the flaps were set to 45 degrees and the Antonov began a rapid pitch down. 2,100 meters from the runway and in a 25 degree nose down attitude, the aircraft crashed, flipped over and burst into flames. The impact and post-crash fire killed all on board.

== Aircraft ==
Construction of the An-10 involved, serial number 9401402, was completed at the Voronezh aircraft factory on 5 June 1959 and it was transferred to the civil air fleet. At the time of the accident, the aircraft had sustained a total of 277 flight hours.

== Investigation ==
After examination of available evidence, the Air Accident Investigation Commission concluded that an anomaly in the engine power control system combined with substandard placement of other cockpit controls may have been a factor in the crash. They went on to speculate that the pilot in command (PIC) may have reduced power because pitot tube icing caused the airspeed indicator to read higher than actual airspeed.

On 26 February 1960 approximately three months after this accident, another An-10 operating the same flight crashed during similar conditions. Testing eventually revealed that icing of the horizontal stabilizer created a supercritical angle of attack, that caused a sudden pitch down of the aircraft when the flaps are lowered to the maximum setting of 45 degrees. To combat this concern ice protection systems for the stabilizer were improved and selection of flaps beyond 15 degrees in known icing conditions was disallowed.

== See also ==
- Aeroflot accidents and incidents
- Aeroflot accidents and incidents in the 1950s
