= March 26 =

Day 85 of the year in Gregorian calendar

March 26 this year in various calendars
- Thursday, 26 March 2026
Akan	Nkyiyaw
Armenian	9 Ahekani 1475
Aztec	Huei Tecuilhuitl 15, 11 Calli
Babylonian	6 Adaru, 2336 SE
Balinese pawukon	Luang, Pepet, Kajeng, Jaya, Paing, Urukung, Wraspati of Dukut, Kala, Dadi, Raja
Bengali	12 Chaitro, BS 1432
Chinese	Yin Earth Pig・Well Mansion; Fire Horse Year, Month 2, Day 8 (Chunfen, 10 days until Qingming)
Common Era	26 March 2026 CE
Coptic	17 Paremhat, AM 1742
Egyptian	14 Mesori, 2774 NE
Ethiopian	17 Magābit, 2018 Amätä Məhrät
French Republican	Décade I, Sextidi de Germinal de l'Année 234 de la République
Gregorian	26 March, AD 2026
Hebrew	8 Nisan, AM 5786
Hindu	Ārdrā・Saubhāgya; Solar: 13 Caitra, 1947 SE; Lunisolar: Aṣṭamī, Śukla pakṣa of Caitra, 2083 VE; Rāudra・5126 KY・1,872,660
Icelandic	Fimmtudagur, 3 Einmánuður 2025
Islamic	7 Shawwal, AH 1447 (using tabular method)
ISO week date	2026-W13-4
Japanese	8 Kisaragi, Reiwa 8 (Shunbun, 10 days until Seimei)
Julian	13 March, AD 2026 (AM 7534)
Julian day	2461126
Korean	8 Tokkidal, 4359 DE
Maya	13.0.13.8.3; 1 Uayeb, 11 Akbal
Roman	ante diem III Idus Martias, MMDCCLXXIX AUC
Solar Hijri	6 Farvardin, SH 1405
Tibetan	8 dbo, me pho rta 2153 or 1772 or 1000

<<	March					>>
Su	Mo	Tu	We	Th	Fr	Sa
1	2	3	4	5	6	7
8	9	10	11	12	13	14
15	16	17	18	19	20	21
22	23	24	25	26	27	28
29	30	31
2026

March 26 in recent years
2026 (Thursday)
2025 (Wednesday)
2024 (Tuesday)
2023 (Sunday)
2022 (Saturday)
2021 (Friday)
2020 (Thursday)
2019 (Tuesday)
2018 (Monday)
2017 (Sunday)

March 26 is the 85th day of the year (86th in leap years) in the Gregorian calendar; 280 days remain until the end of the year.

== Events ==
=== Pre-1600 ===
- 590 – Emperor Maurice proclaims his son Theodosius as co-emperor of the Byzantine Empire.
- 624 – First Eid al-Fitr celebration.
- 752 – Election of Pope Stephen II following the death of Pope Zachary.
- 1021 – The death of the Fatimid caliph al-Hakim bi-Amr Allah, kept secret for six weeks, is announced, along with the succession of his son, al-Zahir li-i'zaz Din Allah.
- 1027 – Pope John XIX crowns Conrad II as Holy Roman Emperor.
- 1169 – Saladin becomes the emir of Egypt.
- 1244 – The crown of Aragon and the crown of Castile agree in the Treaty of Almizra on the limits of their respective expansion into al-Andalus.
- 1344 – The Siege of Algeciras, one of the first European military engagements where gunpowder was used, comes to an end.
- 1351 – Combat of the Thirty: Thirty Breton knights call out and defeat thirty English knights.
- 1484 – William Caxton prints his translation of Aesop's Fables.
- 1552 – Guru Amar Das becomes the Third Sikh guru.

=== 1601–1900 ===
- 1636 – Utrecht University is founded in the Netherlands.
- 1640 – The Royal Academy of Turku, the first university of Finland, is founded in the city of Turku by Queen Christina of Sweden at the proposal of Count Per Brahe.
- 1651 – The silver-loaded Spanish ship San José, pushed south by strong winds, is wrecked on the coast of southern Chile and its surviving crew members are killed by indigenous Cuncos.
- 1697 – Safavid government troops take control of Basra.
- 1700 – William Dampier is the first European to circumnavigate New Britain, discovering it is an island (which he names Nova Britannia) rather than part of New Guinea.
- 1812 – An earthquake devastates Caracas, Venezuela.
- 1812 – A political cartoon in the Boston-Gazette coins the term "gerrymander" to describe oddly shaped electoral districts designed to help incumbents win reelection.
- 1830 – The Book of Mormon is published in Palmyra, New York.
- 1839 – The first Henley Royal Regatta is held.
- 1871 – The elections of Commune council of the Paris Commune are held.
- 1885 – The Métis people of the District of Saskatchewan under Louis Riel begin the North-West Rebellion against Canada.
- 1896 – An explosion at the Brunner Mine near Greymouth, New Zealand, kills 65 coal miners in the country's worst industrial accident.

=== 1901–present ===
- 1913 – First Balkan War: Bulgarian forces capture Adrianople.
- 1915 – The Vancouver Millionaires win the 1915 Stanley Cup Final, the first championship played between the Pacific Coast Hockey Association and the National Hockey Association.
- 1917 – World War I: First Battle of Gaza: British troops are halted after 17,000 Turks block their advance.
- 1922 – The German Social Democratic Party is founded in Poland.
- 1931 – Swissair is founded as the national airline of Switzerland.
- 1931 – Ho Chi Minh Communist Youth Union is founded in Vietnam.
- 1934 – The United Kingdom driving test is introduced.
- 1939 – Spanish Civil War: Nationalists begin their final offensive of the war.
- 1942 – The Holocaust: The first female prisoners arrive at Auschwitz concentration camp in German-occupied Poland.
- 1945 – World War II: The Battle of Iwo Jima ends as the island is officially secured by American forces.
- 1954 – Nuclear weapons testing: The Romeo shot of Operation Castle is detonated at Bikini Atoll. Yield: 11 megatons.
- 1955 – Pan Am Flight 845/26 ditches in the Pacific Ocean off the coast of Oregon, killing four.
- 1958 – The United States Army launches Explorer 3.
- 1958 – The African Regroupment Party is launched at a meeting in Paris.
- 1967 – Ten thousand people gather for one of many Central Park be-ins in New York City.
- 1970 – South Vietnamese President Nguyễn Văn Thiệu implements a land reform program to solve the problem of land tenancy.
- 1971 – East Pakistan, then a province of Pakistan, declares its independence from Pakistan to form Bangladesh; the Bangladesh War of Independence begins.
- 1975 – The Biological Weapons Convention comes into force.
- 1979 – Anwar al-Sadat, Menachem Begin and Jimmy Carter sign the Egypt–Israel peace treaty in Washington, D.C.
- 1979 – An Interflug Ilyushin Il-18 crashes at Quatro de Fevereiro Airport during a rejected takeoff, killing 10.
- 1981 – Social Democratic Party (UK) is founded as a party.
- 1982 – A groundbreaking ceremony for the Vietnam Veterans Memorial is held in Washington, D.C.
- 1991 – Argentina, Brazil, Uruguay and Paraguay sign the Treaty of Asunción, establishing Mercosur, the South Common Market.
- 1991 – Singapore Airlines Flight 117 is hijacked by four Pakistani terrorists and diverted to Changi Airport.
- 1997 – Thirty-nine bodies are found in the Heaven's Gate mass suicides.
- 1998 – During the Algerian Civil War, the Oued Bouaicha massacre sees fifty-two people, mostly infants, killed with axes and knives.
- 2005 – Around 200,000 to 300,000 Taiwanese demonstrate in Taipei in opposition to the Anti-Secession Law of China.
- 2010 – The South Korean Navy corvette Cheonan is torpedoed, killing 46 sailors. After an international investigation, the President of the United Nations Security Council blames North Korea.
- 2017 – Russia-wide anti-corruption protests in 99 cities. The Levada Center survey showed that 38% of surveyed Russians supported protests and that 67 percent held Putin personally responsible for high-level corruption.
- 2024 – The Francis Scott Key Bridge collapses following a collision between the MV Dali container ship and one of the bridge's support pillars, killing six people.

== Births ==
=== Pre-1600 ===
- 1516 – Conrad Gessner, Swiss botanist and zoologist (died 1565)
- 1554 – Charles of Lorraine, duke of Mayenne (died 1611)
- 1584 – John II, duke of Zweibrücken (died 1635)

=== 1601–1900 ===
- 1633 – Mary Beale, British artist (died 1699)
- 1634 – Domenico Freschi, Italian priest and composer (died 1710)
- 1656 – Nicolaas Hartsoeker, Dutch mathematician and physicist (died 1725)
- 1687 – Sophia Dorothea of Hanover, queen consort of Prussia (died 1757)
- 1698 – Prokop Diviš, Czech priest, scientist and inventor (died 1765)
- 1749 – William Blount, American politician (died 1800)
- 1753 – Benjamin Thompson, American-French physicist and politician, Under-Secretary of State for the Colonies (died 1814)
- 1773 – Nathaniel Bowditch, American mathematician and navigator (died 1838)
- 1794 – Julius Schnorr von Carolsfeld, German painter (died 1872)
- 1804 – David Humphreys Storer, American physician and academic (died 1891)
- 1824 – Julie-Victoire Daubié, French journalist (died 1874)
- 1829 – Théodore Aubanel, French poet (died 1886)
- 1829 – Georg Andreas Bull, Norwegian architect (died 1917)
- 1830 – Dewitt Clinton Senter, American politician, 18th Governor of Tennessee (died 1898)
- 1842 – Alexandre Saint-Yves d'Alveydre, French occultist (died 1909)
- 1850 – Edward Bellamy, American author, socialist, and utopian visionary (died 1898)
- 1852 – Élémir Bourges, French author (died 1925)
- 1854 – Maurice Lecoq, French target shooter (died 1925)
- 1856 – William Massey, Irish-New Zealand farmer and politician, 19th Prime Minister of New Zealand (died 1925)
- 1857 – Théodore Tuffier, French surgeon (died 1929)
- 1859 – A. E. Housman, English poet and scholar (died 1936)
- 1859 – Adolf Hurwitz, German-Swiss mathematician and academic (died 1919)
- 1860 – André Prévost, French tennis player (died 1919)
- 1866 – Fred Karno, English producer and manager (died 1941)
- 1868 – King Fuad I of Egypt (died 1936)
- 1873 – Dorothea Bleek, South African-German anthropologist and philologist (died 1948)
- 1874 – Robert Frost, American poet and playwright (died 1963)
- 1875 – Max Abraham, Polish-German physicist and academic (died 1922)
- 1875 – Syngman Rhee, South Korean journalist and politician, 1st President of South Korea (died 1965)
- 1876 – William of Wied, prince of Albania (died 1945)
- 1876 – Kate Richards O'Hare, American Socialist Party activist and editor (died 1948)
- 1879 – Othmar Ammann, Swiss-American engineer, designed the George Washington Bridge and Verrazzano–Narrows Bridge (died 1965)
- 1879 – Waldemar Tietgens, German rower (died 1917)
- 1881 – Guccio Gucci, Italian fashion designer, founded Gucci (died 1953)
- 1882 – Hermann Obrecht, Swiss politician (died 1940)
- 1884 – Wilhelm Backhaus, German pianist and educator (died 1969)
- 1884 – Georges Imbert, French chemical engineer and inventor (died 1950)
- 1886 – Hugh Mulzac, Vincentian-American soldier and politician (died 1971)
- 1888 – Elsa Brändström, Swedish nurse and philanthropist (died 1948)
- 1893 – James Bryant Conant, American chemist, academic, and diplomat, 1st United States Ambassador to West Germany (died 1978)
- 1893 – Palmiro Togliatti, Italian journalist and politician, Italian Minister of Justice (died 1964)
- 1894 – Viorica Ursuleac, Ukrainian-Romanian soprano and actress (died 1985)
- 1895 – Vilho Tuulos, Finnish triple jumper (died 1967)
- 1898 – Rudolf Dassler, German businessman, founded Puma SE (died 1974)
- 1898 – Charles Shadwell, English conductor and bandleader (died 1979)
- 1900 – Angela Maria Autsch, German nun, died in Auschwitz helping Jewish prisoners (died 1941)

=== 1901–present ===
- 1904 – Joseph Campbell, American mythologist and author (died 1987)
- 1904 – Emilio Fernández, Mexican actor, director, and screenwriter (died 1986)
- 1904 – Attilio Ferraris, Italian footballer (died 1947)
- 1904 – Xenophon Zolotas, Greek economist and Prime Minister of Greece (died 2004)
- 1905 – Monty Berman, English cinematographer and producer (died 2006)
- 1905 – André Cluytens, Belgian-French conductor and director (died 1967)
- 1905 – Viktor Frankl, Austrian neurologist and psychiatrist (died 1997)
- 1905 – Mona Williams, American novelist, short story writer and poet (died 1991)
- 1906 – Rafael Méndez, Mexican trumpet player and composer (died 1981)
- 1906 – H. Radclyffe Roberts, American entomologist and museum administrator (died 1982)
- 1907 – Azellus Denis, Canadian lawyer and politician, Postmaster General of Canada (died 1991)
- 1907 – Mahadevi Varma, Indian poet and activist (died 1987)
- 1908 – Franz Stangl, Austrian-German SS officer, convicted Holocaust extermination camp commandant (died 1971)
- 1909 – Chips Rafferty, Australian actor (died 1971)
- 1909 – Héctor José Cámpora, former President of Argentina (died 1980)
- 1910 – K. W. Devanayagam, Sri Lankan lawyer and politician, 10th Sri Lankan Minister of Justice (died 2002)
- 1911 – Lennart Atterwall, Swedish javelin thrower (died 2001)
- 1911 – J. L. Austin, English philosopher and academic (died 1960)
- 1911 – Bernard Katz, German-English biophysicist, Nobel Prize laureate (died 2003)
- 1911 – Tennessee Williams, American playwright and poet (died 1983)
- 1913 – Jacqueline de Romilly, Franco-Greek philologist, author, and scholar (died 2010)
- 1913 – Paul Erdős, Hungarian-Polish mathematician and academic (died 1996)
- 1914 – Toru Kumon, Japanese mathematician and academic (died 1995)
- 1914 – William Westmoreland, American general, commander during the Vietnam War (died 2005)
- 1915 – Lennart Strandberg, Swedish sprinter (died 1989)
- 1915 – Hwang Sun-won, North Korean author and poet (died 2000)
- 1916 – Christian B. Anfinsen, American biochemist and academic, Nobel Prize laureate (died 1995)
- 1916 – Bill Edrich, English cricketer and footballer (died 1986)
- 1916 – Sterling Hayden, American actor and author (died 1986)
- 1917 – Rufus Thomas, American R&B singer-songwriter (died 2001)
- 1919 – Strother Martin, American actor (died 1980)
- 1919 – Roger Leger, Canadian ice hockey player (died 1965)
- 1920 – Sergio Livingstone, Chilean footballer and journalist (died 2012)
- 1922 – William Milliken, American politician, 44th Governor of Michigan (died 2019)
- 1922 – Oscar Sala, Italian-Brazilian physicist and academic (died 2010)
- 1922 – Guido Stampacchia, Italian mathematician and academic (died 1978)
- 1923 – Gert Bastian, German general and politician (died 1992)
- 1923 – Bob Elliott, American comedian, actor, and screenwriter (died 2016)
- 1925 – Maqsood Ahmed, Pakistani cricketer (died 1999)
- 1925 – Pierre Boulez, French pianist, composer, and conductor (died 2016)
- 1925 – Vesta Roy, American politician, Governor of New Hampshire (died 2002)
- 1925 – Edward Graham, Baron Graham of Edmonton, English soldier and politician (died 2020)
- 1925 – Ben Mondor, Canadian-American businessman (died 2010)
- 1925 – James Moody, American saxophonist and composer (died 2010)
- 1927 – Harold Chapman, English photographer (died 2022)
- 1929 – Charles Dumont, French singer and composer (died 2024)
- 1929 – Edward Sorel, American illustrator and caricaturist
- 1929 – Edwin Turney, American businessman, co-founded Advanced Micro Devices (died 2008)
- 1930 – Gregory Corso, American poet (died 2001)
- 1930 – Sandra Day O'Connor, American lawyer and jurist (died 2023)
- 1931 – Leonard Nimoy, American actor (died 2015)
- 1932 – Leroy Griffith, American businessman
- 1932 – James Andrew Harris, American chemist and academic (died 2000)
- 1933 – Tinto Brass, Italian director and screenwriter (died 2026)
- 1934 – Alan Arkin, American actor (died 2023)
- 1934 – Edvaldo Alves de Santa Rosa, Brazilian footballer (died 2002)
- 1937 – Wayne Embry, American basketball player and manager
- 1937 – Barbara Jones, American sprinter
- 1937 – James Lee, Canadian businessman and politician, 26th Premier of Prince Edward Island (died 2023)
- 1938 – Norman Ackroyd, English painter and illustrator (died 2024)
- 1938 – Anthony James Leggett, English-American physicist and academic, Nobel Prize laureate (died 2026)
- 1940 – James Caan, American actor and singer (died 2022)
- 1940 – Nancy Pelosi, American lawyer and politician, 52nd Speaker of the United States House of Representatives
- 1941 – Richard Dawkins, Kenyan-English ethologist, biologist, and academic
- 1940 – Jörg Streli, Austrian architect (died 2019)
- 1941 – Lella Lombardi, Italian racing driver (died 1992)
- 1942 – Erica Jong, American novelist and poet
- 1943 – Mustafa Kalemli, Turkish physician and politician, Turkish Minister of the Interior
- 1943 – Bob Woodward, American journalist and author
- 1944 – Diana Ross, American singer-songwriter, producer, and actress
- 1945 – Paul Bérenger, Mauritian politician, Prime Minister of Mauritius
- 1945 – Mikhail Voronin, Russian gymnast and coach (died 2004)
- 1946 – Johnny Crawford, American actor and singer (died 2021)
- 1946 – Alain Madelin, French politician, French Minister of Finance
- 1947 – Subhash Kak, Indian-American professor and author
- 1947 – John Rowles, New Zealand-Australian singer-songwriter
- 1948 – Kyung-wha Chung, South Korean violinist and educator
- 1948 – Richard Tandy, English pianist and keyboard player (died 2024)
- 1948 – Steven Tyler, American singer-songwriter and actor
- 1949 – Jon English, English-Australian singer-songwriter and actor (died 2016)
- 1949 – Rudi Koertzen, South African cricketer and umpire (died 2022)
- 1949 – Vicki Lawrence, American actress, comedian, talk show host, and singer
- 1949 – Fran Sheehan, American bass player
- 1949 – Patrick Süskind, German author and screenwriter
- 1949 – Ernest Lee Thomas, American actor
- 1950 – Teddy Pendergrass, American singer-songwriter (died 2010)
- 1950 – Graham Barlow, English cricketer
- 1950 – Martin Short, Canadian-American actor, screenwriter, and producer
- 1950 – Alan Silvestri, American composer and conductor
- 1951 – Željko Pavličević, Croatian professional basketball coach and former professional player
- 1951 – Carl Wieman, American physicist and academic, Nobel Prize laureate
- 1952 – Didier Pironi, French racing driver (died 1987)
- 1953 – Lincoln Chafee, American academic and politician, 74th Governor of Rhode Island
- 1953 – Elaine Chao, Taiwanese-American banker and politician, 24th United States Secretary of Labor
- 1953 – Tatyana Providokhina, Russian runner
- 1954 – Clive Palmer, Australian businessman and politician
- 1954 – Curtis Sliwa, American talk show host and activist, founded Guardian Angels
- 1954 – Dorothy Porter, Australian poet and playwright (died 2008)
- 1956 – Charly McClain, American country music singer
- 1956 – Park Won-soon, South Korean lawyer and politician, 35th Mayor of Seoul (died 2020)
- 1957 – Fiona Bruce, Scottish lawyer and politician
- 1957 – Leeza Gibbons, American talk show host and television personality
- 1957 – Paul Morley, English journalist, producer, and author
- 1957 – Shirin Neshat, Iranian visual artist
- 1958 – Elio de Angelis, Italian racing driver (died 1986)
- 1960 – Marcus Allen, American football player and sportscaster
- 1960 – Jennifer Grey, American actress and dancer
- 1960 – Graeme Rutjes, Australian-Dutch footballer
- 1961 – William Hague, English historian and politician, First Secretary of State
- 1962 – Richard Coles, English pianist, saxophonist, and priest
- 1962 – Kevin Seitzer, American baseball player and coach
- 1962 – Yuri Gidzenko, Russian pilot and cosmonaut
- 1962 – John Stockton, American basketball player and coach
- 1962 – Eric Allan Kramer, American-Canadian actor
- 1963 – Natsuhiko Kyogoku, Japanese author
- 1964 – Martin Bella, Australian rugby league player
- 1964 – Martin Donnelly, Irish racing driver
- 1964 – Maria Miller, English businessman and politician, Secretary of State for Culture, Media and Sport
- 1964 – Ulf Samuelsson, Swedish-American ice hockey player and coach
- 1965 – Trey Azagthoth, American guitarist, songwriter, and producer
- 1965 – Violeta Szekely, Romanian runner
- 1966 – Michael Imperioli, American actor and screenwriter
- 1967 – Jason Chaffetz, American politician
- 1968 – Laurent Brochard, French cyclist
- 1968 – Kenny Chesney, American singer-songwriter and guitarist
- 1968 – James Iha, American guitarist and songwriter
- 1969 – Alessandro Moscardi, Italian rugby player
- 1970 – Paul Bosvelt, Dutch footballer
- 1970 – Jelle Goes, Dutch footballer and coach
- 1970 – Thomas Kyparissis, Greek footballer
- 1970 – Martin McDonagh, English-born Irish playwright, screenwriter, and director
- 1971 – Martyn Day, Scottish politician
- 1971 – Erick Morillo, Colombian-American disc jockey, record label owner, and music producer (died 2020)
- 1971 – Rennae Stubbs, Australian tennis player and sportscaster
- 1971 – Paul Williams, English footballer and manager
- 1972 – Leslie Mann, American actress
- 1972 – Jason Maxwell, American baseball player
- 1973 – Larry Page, American computer scientist and businessman, co-founder of Google
- 1973 – T. R. Knight, American actor
- 1974 – Irina Spîrlea, Romanian tennis player
- 1974 – Vadimas Petrenko, Lithuanian footballer
- 1974 – Michael Peca, Canadian ice hockey player and coach
- 1976 – Amy Smart, American actress and former model
- 1976 – Alex Varas, Chilean footballer
- 1976 – Eirik Verås Larsen, Norwegian sprint kayaker
- 1977 – Kevin Davies, English footballer
- 1977 – Bianca Kajlich, American actress
- 1977 – Sylvain Grenier, Canadian wrestler
- 1978 – Anastasia Kostaki, Greek basketball player
- 1979 – Nacho Novo, Spanish footballer
- 1979 – Ben Blair, New Zealand rugby union footballer
- 1979 – Hiromi Uehara, Japanese pianist and composer
- 1979 – Pierre Womé, Cameroonian footballer
- 1979 – Juliana Paes, Brazilian actress
- 1980 – Margaret Brennan, American journalist
- 1980 – Son Ho-young, South Korean singer
- 1980 – Richie Wellens, English footballer
- 1981 – Sébastien Centomo, Canadian ice hockey player
- 1981 – Zayar Thaw, Burmese rapper and politician (died 2022)
- 1981 – Baruch Dego, Ethiopian-Israeli footballer
- 1981 – Massimo Donati, Italian footballer
- 1981 – Josh Wilson, American baseball player
- 1982 – Mikel Arteta, Spanish footballer
- 1982 – Brendan Ryan, American baseball player
- 1982 – Nate Kaeding, American football player
- 1983 – Andreas Hinkel, German footballer
- 1983 – Floriana Lima, American actress
- 1983 – Roman Bednář, Czech footballer
- 1983 – Mike Mondo, American wrestler
- 1984 – Jimmy Howard, American ice hockey player
- 1984 – Drew Mitchell, Australian rugby player
- 1984 – Felix Neureuther, German skier
- 1984 – Marco Stier, German footballer
- 1984 – Gregory Strydom, Zimbabwean cricketer
- 1984 – Sara Jean Underwood, American model, television host, and actress
- 1985 – Keira Knightley, English actress
- 1985 – Matt Grevers, American swimmer
- 1985 – Jonathan Groff, American actor and singer
- 1985 – Prosper Utseya, Zimbabwean cricketer
- 1986 – Maxime Biset, Belgian footballer
- 1986 – Rob Kearney, Irish rugby player
- 1986 – Emma Laine, Finnish tennis player
- 1987 – Kim Dong-suk, South Korean footballer
- 1987 – Jermichael Finley, American football player
- 1987 – Steven Fletcher, Scottish footballer
- 1989 – Simon Kjær, Danish footballer
- 1989 – Von Miller, American football player
- 1990 – Choi Woo-shik, South Korean actor
- 1990 – Matteo Guidicelli, Filipino actor, model, singer and former kart racer
- 1990 – Patrick Ekeng, Cameroonian footballer (died 2016)
- 1990 – Yuya Takaki, Japanese idol, singer, dancer, model and actor
- 1990 – Xiumin, South Korean singer and actor
- 1991 – Matt Davidson, American baseball player
- 1991 – Ramy Youssef, American actor and comedian
- 1992 – Nina Agdal, Danish model
- 1992 – Stoffel Vandoorne, Belgian racing driver
- 1994 – Ryan Arcidiacono, American basketball player
- 1994 – Alison Van Uytvanck, Belgian tennis player
- 1994 – Paige VanZant, American mixed martial artist and model
- 1994 – Jed Wallace, English footballer
- 1994 – Marcela Zacarías, Mexican tennis player
- 1995 – Ibai Llanos, Spanish internet personality
- 1996 – Zane Musgrove, New Zealand rugby league player
- 1996 – Kathryn Bernardo, Filipino actress
- 1998 – Satoko Miyahara, Japanese figure skater
- 2000 – Gefen Primo, Israeli judoka
- 2000 – Andrei Svechnikov, Russian ice hockey player
- 2001 – Jameson Williams, American football player
- 2003 – Bhad Bhabie, American rapper and social media personality
- 2004 – Awra Briguela, Filipino actor and comedian
- 2005 – Ella Anderson, American actress
- 2007 – Jesús Fortea, Spanish footballer

== Deaths ==
=== Pre-1600 ===
- 752 – Pope-elect Stephen
- 809 – Ludger, Frisian missionary
- 903 – Sugawara no Michizane, Japanese poet
- 908 – Ai, emperor of the Tang Dynasty (born 892)
- 922 – Mansur Al-Hallaj, Persian mystic and poet (born 858)
- 929 – Wang Du, Chinese warlord and governor (jiedushi)
- 973 – Guntram ("the Rich"), Frankish nobleman
- 983 – 'Adud al-Dawla, Iranian ruler (born 936)
- 1091 – Wallada bint al-Mustakfi, Andalusian poet
- 1130 – Sigurd the Crusader, Norwegian king (born 1090)
- 1132 – Geoffrey of Vendôme, French cardinal and theologian (born 1065)
- 1212 – Sancho I of Portugal (born 1154)
- 1242 – William de Forz, 3rd Earl of Albemarle
- 1324 – Marie de Luxembourg, Queen of France (born 1304)
- 1326 – Alessandra Giliani, anatomist (born c. 1307)
- 1350 – Alfonso XI of Castile (born 1312)
- 1402 – David Stewart, Duke of Rothesay, heir to the throne of Scotland (born 1378)
- 1437 – Walter Stewart, Earl of Atholl, Scottish nobleman and regicide
- 1517 – Heinrich Isaac, Flemish composer (born 1450)
- 1535 – Georg Tannstetter, Austrian mathematician, astronomer, and cartographer (born 1482)
- 1546 – Thomas Elyot, English scholar and diplomat (born 1490)
- 1566 – Antonio de Cabezón, Spanish organist and composer (born 1510)

=== 1601–1900 ===
- 1625 – Giambattista Marini, Italian poet (born 1569)
- 1649 – John Winthrop, English lawyer and politician, 2nd Governor of the Massachusetts Bay Colony
- 1679 – Johannes Schefferus, Swedish historian and author (born 1621)
- 1697 – Godfrey McCulloch, Scottish politician (born 1640)
- 1726 – John Vanbrugh, English playwright and architect, designed Blenheim Palace and Castle Howard (born 1664)
- 1772 – Charles Pinot Duclos, French author and politician (born 1704)
- 1776 – Samuel Ward, American politician, 31st and 33rd Governor of the Colony of Rhode Island and Providence Plantations (born 1725)
- 1780 – Charles I, Duke of Brunswick-Wolfenbüttel (born 1713)
- 1793 – John Mudge, English physician and engineer (born 1721)
- 1797 – James Hutton, Scottish geologist and physician (born 1726)
- 1814 – Joseph-Ignace Guillotin, French physician and politician (born 1738)
- 1827 – Ludwig van Beethoven, German pianist and composer (born 1770)
- 1858 – John Addison Thomas, American lieutenant, engineer, and politician, 3rd United States Assistant Secretary of State (born 1811)
- 1862 – Uriah P. Levy, American commander (born 1792)
- 1881 – Roman Sanguszko, Polish general and activist (born 1800)
- 1881 – Old Abe, 8th Wisconsin Volunteer Infantry Regiment Mascot (born 1861)
- 1885 – Anson Stager, American general and businessman, co-founded Western Union (born 1825)
- 1888 – Barghash bin Said of Zanzibar (born 1837)
- 1892 – Walt Whitman, American poet, essayist, and journalist (born 1819)

=== 1901–present ===
- 1902 – Cecil Rhodes, English-South African colonialist, businessman and politician, 6th Prime Minister of the Cape Colony (born 1853)
- 1905 – Maurice Barrymore, American actor (born 1849)
- 1910 – Auguste Charlois, French astronomer (born 1864)
- 1920 – William Chester Minor, American surgeon and lexicographer (born 1834)
- 1923 – Sarah Bernhardt, French actress and screenwriter (born 1844)
- 1926 – Constantin Fehrenbach, German lawyer and politician, Chancellor of Germany (born 1852)
- 1931 – Joseph Dutton, assisted Father Damien on the island of Molokai for 45 years.
- 1932 – Henry M. Leland, American machinist, inventor, engineer, automotive entrepreneur and founder of Cadillac and Lincoln (born 1843)
- 1934 – John Biller, American jumper and discus thrower (born 1877)
- 1940 – Wilhelm Anderson, German-Estonian astrophysicist (born 1880)
- 1940 – Spyridon Louis, Greek runner (born 1873)
- 1942 – Jimmy Burke, American baseball player and manager (born 1874)
- 1942 – Carolyn Wells, American novelist and poet (born 1862)
- 1945 – David Lloyd George, English-Welsh lawyer and politician, Prime Minister of the United Kingdom (born 1863)
- 1951 – James F. Hinkle, American banker and politician, 6th Governor of New Mexico (born 1864)
- 1954 – Charles Perrin, French rower (born 1875)
- 1957 – Édouard Herriot, French politician, Prime Minister of France (born 1872)
- 1957 – Max Ophüls, German-American director and screenwriter (born 1902)
- 1958 – Phil Mead, English cricketer and footballer (born 1887)
- 1959 – Raymond Chandler, American crime novelist and screenwriter (born 1888)
- 1965 - Alice Herz, German peace activist who self-immolated in protest of U.S. imperialism (born 1882) 1
- 1966 – Victor Hochepied, French swimmer (born 1883)
- 1966 – Cyril Hume, American novelist and screenwriter (born 1900)
- 1969 – John Kennedy Toole, American novelist (born 1937)
- 1973 – Noël Coward, English playwright, actor, and composer (born 1899)
- 1973 – Johnny Drake, American football player (born 1916)
- 1979 – Beauford Delaney, American-French painter (born 1901)
- 1979 – Jean Stafford, American author and academic (born 1915)
- 1980 – Roland Barthes, French linguist and critic (born 1915)
- 1983 – Anthony Blunt, English historian and spy (born 1907)
- 1984 – Ahmed Sékou Touré, Guinean politician, 1st President of Guinea (born 1922)
- 1987 – Eugen Jochum, German conductor (born 1902)
- 1987 – Walter Abel, American actor (born 1898)
- 1990 – Halston, American fashion designer (born 1932)
- 1992 – Barbara Frum, American-Canadian journalist and radio host (born 1937)
- 1993 – Louis Falco, American dancer and choreographer (born 1942)
- 1995 – Eazy-E, American rapper and producer (born 1964)
- 1996 – Edmund Muskie, American lieutenant, lawyer, and politician, 58th United States Secretary of State (born 1914)
- 1996 – David Packard, American engineer and businessman, co-founded Hewlett-Packard (born 1912)
- 1996 – John Snagge, English journalist (born 1904)
- 2000 – Alex Comfort, English physician and author (born 1920)
- 2002 – Randy Castillo, American drummer and songwriter (born 1950)
- 2003 – Daniel Patrick Moynihan, American sociologist and politician, 12th United States Ambassador to the United Nations (born 1927)
- 2004 – Jan Sterling, American actress (born 1921)
- 2005 – James Callaghan, English lieutenant and politician, Prime Minister of the United Kingdom (born 1912)
- 2005 – Frederick Rotimi Williams, Nigerian lawyer and politician (born 1920)
- 2006 – Anil Biswas, Indian journalist and politician (born 1944)
- 2006 – Paul Dana, American racing driver (born 1975)
- 2006 – Nikki Sudden, English singer-songwriter and guitarist (born 1956)
- 2008 – Robert Fagles, American poet and academic (born 1933)
- 2008 – Manuel Marulanda, Colombian rebel leader (born 1930)
- 2009 – Shane McConkey, Canadian skier and BASE jumper (born 1969)
- 2009 – Arne Bendiksen, Norwegian singer and composer (born 1926)
- 2010 – Charles Ryskamp, American art collector and curator (born 1928)
- 2011 – Roger Abbott, English-Canadian actor, producer, and screenwriter (born 1946)
- 2011 – Geraldine Ferraro, American lawyer and politician (born 1935)
- 2011 – Diana Wynne Jones, English author (born 1934)
- 2012 – Sisto Averno, American football player (born 1925)
- 2012 – Michael Begley, Irish carpenter and politician (born 1932)
- 2012 – Thomas M. Cover, American theorist and academic (born 1938)
- 2012 – David Craighead, American organist and educator (born 1924)
- 2012 – Manik Godghate, Indian poet and educator (born 1937)
- 2012 – Helmer Ringgren, Swedish theologian and academic (born 1917)
- 2013 – Tom Boerwinkle, American basketball player and sportscaster (born 1945)
- 2013 – Krzysztof Kozłowski, Polish journalist and politician, Polish Minister of Interior (born 1931)
- 2013 – Dave Leggett, American football player (born 1933)
- 2013 – Don Payne, American screenwriter and producer (born 1964)
- 2014 – Roger Birkman, American psychologist and author (born 1919)
- 2014 – Dick Guidry, American businessman and politician (born 1929)
- 2014 – Marcus Kimball, Baron Kimball, English politician (born 1928)
- 2015 – Dinkha IV, Iraqi patriarch (born 1935)
- 2015 – Friedrich L. Bauer, German mathematician, computer scientist, and academic (born 1924)
- 2015 – Tomas Tranströmer, Swedish poet, translator, and psychologist Nobel Prize laureate (born 1931)
- 2016 – Jim Harrison, American novelist, essayist, and poet (born 1937)
- 2018 – Fabrizio Frizzi, Italian television presenter (born 1958)
- 2023 – María Kodama, Argentine writer and translator (born 1937)
- 2023 – Innocent Vareed Thekkethala, Indian actor and politician (born 1948)
- 2023 – Jacob Ziv, Israeli electrical engineer, developed the LZ family of compression algorithms (born 1931)
- 2024 – Esther Coopersmith, American diplomat, UNESCO goodwill ambassador (born 1930)
- 2026 – Noelia Castillo, Spanish woman who died after receiving euthanasia (born 2000)
- 2026 – Mary Rand, English sprinter and long jumper (born 1940)
- 2026 – Epeli Nailatikau, Fijian chief, President of Fiji (born 1941)
- 2026 – James Tolkan, American actor (born 1931)

== Holidays and observances ==
- Christian feast days:
  - Barontius and Desiderius
  - Castulus
  - Emmanuel and companions
  - Felicitas
  - Harriet Monsell (Church of England)
  - Larissa
  - Ludger
  - Maddalena Caterina Morano
  - Richard Allen (Episcopal Church (USA))
  - March 26 (Eastern Orthodox liturgics)
- Independence Day and National Day (Bangladesh), celebrates the declaration of independence from Pakistan in 1971.
- Martyr's Day or Day of Democracy (Mali)
- National Science Appreciation Day (United States)
- Prince Kūhiō Day (Hawaii, United States)
- Purple Day (Canada and United States)
- Synaxis of the Archangel Gabriel (Eastern Christianity)
