= Cyran =

Cyran may refer to:

- Sigiramnus or Cyran, 7th century Frankish saint and abbot
- Jean du Vergier de Hauranne, known as the abbé de Saint-Cyran, 17th century theologian
- Saint-Cyran-du-Jambot, French commune
