= 1991 Interflug A310 incident =

Aviation incident in the Soviet Union

- D-AOAC, the aircraft involved in the incident, seen in October 1991 after its return to service

Occurrence
- Date: February 11, 1991
- Summary: Loss of control and stalling
- Site: over Sheremetyevo International Airport, Moscow, Soviet Union

Aircraft
- Aircraft type: Airbus A310-304
- Operator: Interflug
- Registration: D-AOAC
- Flight origin: Berlin Schönefeld Airport, Berlin, East Germany
- Destination: Sheremetyevo International Airport, Moscow, Soviet Union
- Occupants: 109
- Passengers: 100
- Crew: 9
- Fatalities: 0
- Injuries: 0
- Survivors: 109

On February 11, 1991, an Interflug Airbus A310 operating a flight from Berlin to Moscow completely lost the crew's control for a short time due to a conflict between the pilots' actions and the autopilot's logic. For over six minutes, the airliner performed uncontrolled, sharp climbs and dives, stalling into a steep bank four times, before the pilots managed to regain control and land the plane safely. No one was injured.

== Background ==
=== Aircraft ===
The aircraft was an Airbus A310-304 with registration D-AOAC and manufacturer's serial number 503. The plane was powered by two General Electric CF6-80C2A2 turbofan engines. Initially operated by the East German airline Interflug, it was transferred to the German Air Force (Luftwaffe) after Interflug's dissolution, where it received the military designation 10+23, was named Kurt Schumacher, and joined the government flight wing.

=== Crew and passengers ===
There were 109 people on board: 100 passengers and 9 crew members. The captain had a total of 6,399 flight hours, of which 5,669 hours were on the turboprop Il-18 and only 730 hours on the Airbus A310. The first officer had 6,778 flight hours, including 5,509 hours on the Il-18 and 1,269 hours on the Airbus A310. Both pilots had significant experience flying older-generation aircraft.

== Incident ==
On the morning of February 11, 1991, the plane departed from Berlin Schönefeld Airport bound for Sheremetyevo Airport in Moscow. A few minutes before 11:00 AM, the Airbus A310 began its approach to land on runway 25L at Sheremetyevo Airport. The approach was being conducted automatically under air traffic control guidance. The crew was routinely preparing the aircraft for landing, and the first officer had set the prescribed go-around altitude of 3,580 feet on the autopilot. With flaps and slats extended, the plane was nearing the touchdown point when, at an altitude of 1,550 feet, the controller instructed them to go around due to the runway being occupied. At 10:56, the pilots activated the go-around mode by pressing the corresponding buttons on the thrust levers, retracted the landing gear, adjusted the flap setting, and changed the selected go-around altitude to 1,640 feet as instructed by the controller.

As later revealed by flight recorder data, the automatics began a standard climb. However, 41 seconds later, the captain felt the pitch-up angle was too steep. Believing he was disengaging the autopilot, he attempted to lower the aircraft's nose by pushing the control stick forward. In reality, the autopilot remained engaged and interpreted the force on the stick as a command to trim the stabilizer, consequently driving the trim tab in the opposite direction. After the selected go-around altitude was reached, the autopilot automatically disconnected due to the sustained force on the stick, but the pilots did not notice this. Continuing their attempts to correct the aircraft's attitude, they ignored the visual and aural alerts in the cockpit. The aircraft entered an uncontrolled regime: with engines running at takeoff thrust, it began to climb almost vertically at an alarming rate. At 10:57:17, having reached 5,580 feet, the aircraft lost speed and stalled, banking left before entering a steep dive. At 10:57:46, at 1,487 feet, it transitioned back to a climb, reaching 5,787 feet 29 seconds later before stalling again, this time banking left. At 10:58:40, at 1,775 feet, the nose pitched up once more, surging to 7,355 feet in 31 seconds, then stalling into a right bank. In total, over six minutes and ten seconds, the aircraft stalled four times, coming close to inverting. Only after the pilots intuitively reduced engine thrust and inadvertently changed the trim setting did they regain control. At 11:03, the aircraft was once again responsive to the crew's inputs, and at 11:05:58, the pilots took full manual control and landed the plane safely at Sheremetyevo. As all passengers and crew were buckled in, no one was injured.

== Investigation ==
The investigation into the incident was conducted by the German Federal Bureau of Aircraft Accident Investigation. The event was classified as an operational violation; no technical malfunctions with the aircraft were found. Due to the extreme maneuvers and operations outside the design envelope, some automatic control subsystems had disconnected. The report concluded that the incident was caused by a breakdown in interaction between the crew and the automatics. The pilots did not understand the autopilot's logic in go-around mode and were unaware that disengaging it required pressing a specific button on the sidestick, not simply applying force to the controls. They missed the warning signals in the cockpit and failed to recognize the escalating danger caused by the runaway stabilizer trim. It was particularly emphasized that the crew, despite their vast experience flying older aircraft types, was unprepared to manage the complex automation of a modern airliner. The report stated that the pilots failed to adhere to principles of crew coordination and cockpit resource management and were simply unable to cope with controlling an aircraft equipped with a glass cockpit and designed for a two-person crew. The lead investigator, graduate engineer Johann Reuss, summarized that the incident occurred due to disrupted communication between the machine and the humans; the crew, who were supposed to merely monitor the automatics, actively intervened in the controls and failed to understand the consequences of their actions.
