= Barontius and Desiderius =

Italian Roman Catholic saints

Saints Barontius and Desiderius
- Died: c. 725 AD
- Venerated in: Roman Catholic Church
- Feast: March 25

"Barontius" is also the name of a martyr associated with Saint Crispoldus.

Barontius (Barontus) (French: Baronce, Italian: Baronto, Baronzio) and Desiderius (French: Dizier, Italian: Desiderio) were two 8th century hermits who are venerated as saints by the Catholic Church. They were hermits near Pistoia, in Italy.

Barontius had been a Frankish nobleman of Berry who had, with his son, been a monk at Saint-Pierre de Longoret (Longoreto, Longoretum, Lonrey) (diocese of Bourges), now the monastery of Saint-Cyran-du-Jambot. Barontius was a former member of the court of Theuderic II.

== Visio Baronti Monachi Longoretensis ==
According to the text known as Visio Baronti Monachi Longoretensis, a 4700-word long text dated 25 March 678 or 679 purportedly written by Barontius himself, Barontius received a vision of heaven and hell around 678. Barontius, described by one scholar as “a middle-aged former public servant with three marriages and far too many mistresses on his conscience,” claims that he fell into a coma and had a vision that he was flying through the air above the Bourges region as demons clawed and kicked at him.

Accompanied by the archangel Raphael, Barontius journeys through the four levels of heaven, although he continues to be tormented by the demons, who want to pull him down to hell. Barontius meets people he has known, including fellow monks from Longoreto. Raphael asks another angel to bring Saint Peter to them, so that Peter can judge Barontius.

The demons bring their evidence against Barontius, going “over all the sins that [Barontius] had committed from infancy onwards, including those which [he] had totally forgetten.” However, the demons get so annoying that Peter whacks them with his keys, sending them away. Peter then decides to send Barontius back to earth via hell, where Barontius sees all of the souls in torment before returning to earth.

When he recovers, he is asked to tell of his vision.

== At Pistoia ==
This vision led to Barontius' decision to become a hermit in Italy, and he established himself near Pistoia with Desiderius, also a former monk.

They lived an austere life, and were joined by disciples.

They died around 725 AD. Their names appear in the Martyrologium Romanum.
