= 1979 Interflug Ilyushin Il-18 crash =

Airplane crash in Luanda, Angola

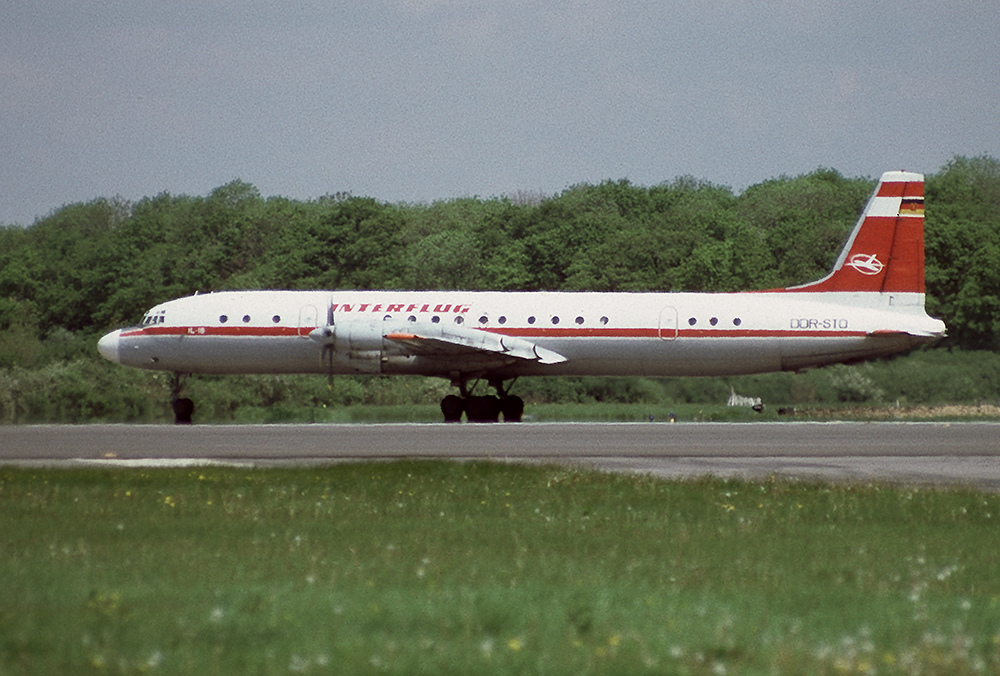
- An Interflug Il-18, similar to the one involved in the crash

Accident
- Date: March 26, 1979
- Summary: Overshoot runway due to engine failure and pilot error
- Site: Quatro de Fevereiro Airport, Luanda, Angola; 8°52′41″S 13°12′42″E

Aircraft
- Aircraft type: Ilyushin Il-18D
- Operator: Interflug
- Registration: DM-STL
- Flight origin: Quatro de Fevereiro Airport, Luanda, Angola
- Destination: Lusaka International Airport, Lusaka, Zambia
- Passengers: 6
- Crew: 4
- Fatalities: 10
- Survivors: 0

On 26 March 1979, an Ilyushin IL-18 crashed during takeoff from Quatro de Fevereiro Airport in Luanda, Angola, killing all ten people on board.

== Background ==
When Angola gained independence in 1975, power was in the hands of the People's Movement for the Liberation of Angola (MLPA), which was supported by the Soviet Union and the Eastern Bloc. The Zimbabwe African People's Union (ZAPU), which fought for the abolition of apartheid in Southern Rhodesia, also enjoyed the support of communist countries. For the planned ZAPU offensive, heavy weapons were delivered to the port of Luanda from East Germany by sea, which were planned to be further transported by air to Lusaka, Zambia, which bordered Southern Rhodesia (their government also supported ZAPU). As TAAG Angola Airlines could not transport these deliveries, an Il-18 cargo aircraft from Interflug was chartered instead, which was supposed to carry a total of 500 tons of weapons. Because the transportation of such cargo was prohibited by international agreements, the operation was carried out in secrecy. The plane arrived in Luanda, where the crew and technical staff were supposed to stay until the mission was completed.

== Aircraft and crew ==
The aircraft was an Ilyushin Il-18D (registered as DM-STL) that was built and delivered to Interflug in 1966 as a passenger aircraft. In 1974, it was converted to an Il-18Gr freighter.

The crew consisted of captain Dieter Hartmann (44), first officer Jochen Wilsdorf (29), navigator Horst Umlauft (45), and flight engineer Frank-Rolf John (35).

== Accident ==
The aircraft took off with a take-off weight of 60.5 tons. 56 seconds into the takeoff roll, engine #2 failed. The takeoff was rejected, but there was insufficient runway remaining. The aircraft overran the end of the runway at high speed, collided with the instrument landing system antennas and burst into flames. All 10 people on board were killed.

== Investigation ==
The investigation was carried out by the airline led by Interflug's CEO, Klaus Henckes. The commission found that the decision to abort the takeoff was inappropriate, since the aircraft had aborted its takeoff after V_{1} at 145 knots (269 km/h; 167 mph). The V_{1} speed of the accident flight was 120 knots (220 km/h; 140 mph), but the takeoff was aborted at 268 kilometres per hour (145 kn; 167 mph). Captain Hartmann attempted to rotate the aircraft despite the failure, but then rejected the takeoff, presumably concerned that the engines would not provide enough thrust.

== Aftermath ==
Due to the classified nature of the cargo, Angola's report to ICAO stated that the aircraft was carrying humanitarian aid.

The Socialist Unity Party of Germany decided to continue the cargo transfer operation and sent another Ilyushin Il-18 (registration DM-STP) on 2 April 1979.
