= Stralsund–Barth Airport =

Stralsund–Barth Airport Ostseeflughafen Stralsund-Barth

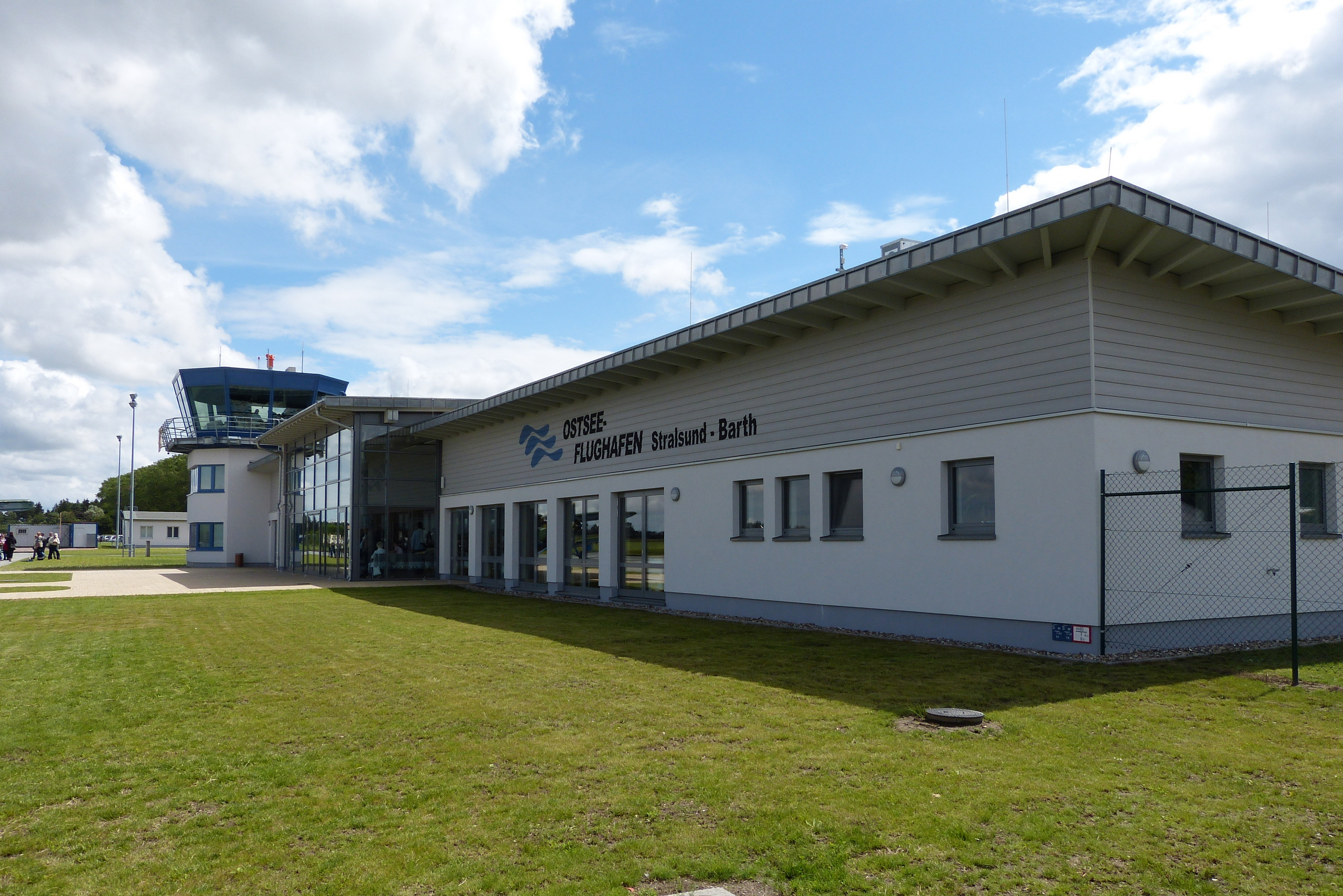
- IATA: BBH; ICAO: EDBH

Summary
- Airport type: Public
- Serves: Stralsund and Barth, Germany
- Elevation AMSL: 23 ft / 7 m
- Coordinates: 54°20′17.43″N 12°43′36.38″E
- Website: ostseeflughafen-stralsund-barth.de

Map
- Location of Airport in Mecklenburg-Vorpommern

Runways
Direction	Length		Surface
Direction	ft	m	Surface
09/27	5,528	1,685	Asphalt

Stralsund–Barth Airport (IATA: BBH, ICAO: EDBH), Ostseeflughafen Stralsund-Barth in German, is a regional airport serving the city of Stralsund and the town of Barth, Germany. It is located in a popular tourism area at the Baltic Sea (German: Ostsee) and features no scheduled traffic. However, it is extensively used for general aviation including upmarket charter traffic as well as gliding. Previously, the airport was served by Interflug, which existed from 1963 to 1991.

== History ==
The airport used to be an airfield of the Luftwaffe and was inaugurated in 1936. After World War II it was shut down.

Commercial passenger traffic began in 1957, when the airfield was extended with new passenger facilities. Lufthansa of East Germany inaugurated routes to the cities of East Berlin, Leipzig, Erfurt and Dresden. Until 1975 the airport was then served by Interflug, providing leisure traffic throughout the GDR. Then, the airport was closed for passenger operations due to political reasons. Between 1975 and 1990, Barth was the base for Interflug's agricultural aviation in the Rostock district.

After the Reunification of Germany, Stralsund–Barth Airport has been extended and modernisied in several stages. However, scheduled traffic did not return due to the runway being too short for most modern passenger airplanes.

After intensive modernization, the airport was finally completed on 25 April 2012. A new control tower and terminal were built, the runway was extended to 1,450m. The new concept is targeted on the establishment of a hot spot for the Offshore wind power industry in the Baltic Sea. An airport is needed to build the wind parks, secure maintenance and to be in place in case of an accident.

== See also ==
- Transport in Germany
- List of airports in Germany
