= Saint-Cyran-du-Jambot =

- Commune
- Location of Saint-Cyran-du-Jambot
- Location within France Location within Centre-Val de Loire
- Coordinates: 47°01′19″N 1°08′17″E
- Country: France
- Region: Centre-Val de Loire
- Department: Indre
- Arrondissement: Châteauroux
- Canton: Buzançais

Government
  - Mayor (2020–2026): Françoise Fauchon-Verdier
- Area^{1}: 14.21 km^{2} (5.49 sq mi)
- Elevation: 132 m (433 ft)
- Highest elevation: 143 m (469 ft)
- Lowest elevation: 79 m (259 ft)
- Population (2023): 171
  - Density: 12.0/km^{2} (31.2/sq mi)
- Time zone: UTC+01:00 (CET)
  - Summer (DST): UTC+02:00 (CEST)
- INSEE/Postal code: 36188 /36700
- ^{1} French Land Register data, which excludes lakes, ponds, glaciers > 1 km^{2} (0.386 sq mi or 247 acres) and river estuaries.

Saint-Cyran-du-Jambot (French pronunciation: [sɛ̃ siʁɑ̃ dy ʒɑ̃bo]) is a commune in the Indre department in central France.

Saint-Cyran's origins lie with a monastic foundation founded by Saint Sigiramnus (Cyran) in the 7th century. The foundation was first known as Saint-Pierre de Longoret (Longoretum, Lonrey) but was later named after its founder. In the 17th century, Jean du Vergier de Hauranne, known as the Abbé de Saint-Cyran, served as abbot of this monastery. He was succeeded by his nephew Martin de Barcos. The monastery was dissolved in 1712.

== Population ==
Historical population
Year	Pop.	±% p.a.
1968	319	—
1975	260	−2.88%
1982	232	−1.61%
1990	208	−1.36%
1999	182	−1.47%
2007	224	+2.63%
2012	205	−1.76%
2017	216	+1.05%
2023	171	−3.82%
Source: INSEE

== See also ==
- Communes of the Indre department
- Berry (province)
