= Deutsche Lufthansa (East Germany) =

Airline and flag carrier of East Germany (1955–1963)

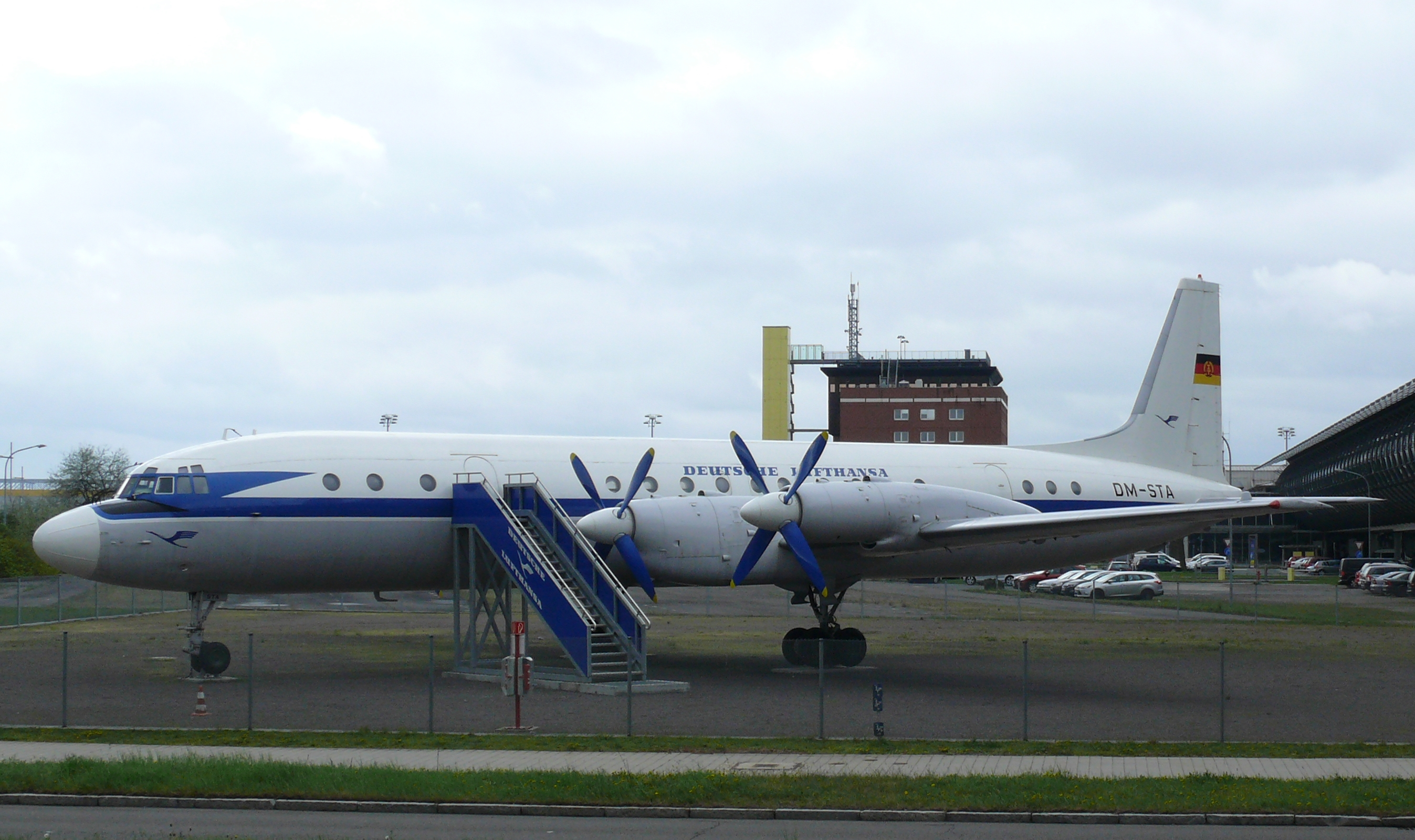
- Ilyushin Il-18V
IATA	ICAO	Call sign
DH	—	—
- Founded: 1955
- Commenced operations: 15 September 1955
- Ceased operations: 1 September 1963 - assets merged into Interflug)
- Hubs: Berlin Schönefeld Airport
- Headquarters: East Berlin, East Germany

Deutsche Lufthansa (abbreviated DLH) was East Germany's flag carrier airline from 1955 to 1963. Because of the usage of the Lufthansa branding (the trademark rights were owned by West German Lufthansa) the East German air company was under constant legal pressure, and was subsequently obliged to give up the name and was replaced by Interflug.

== History ==
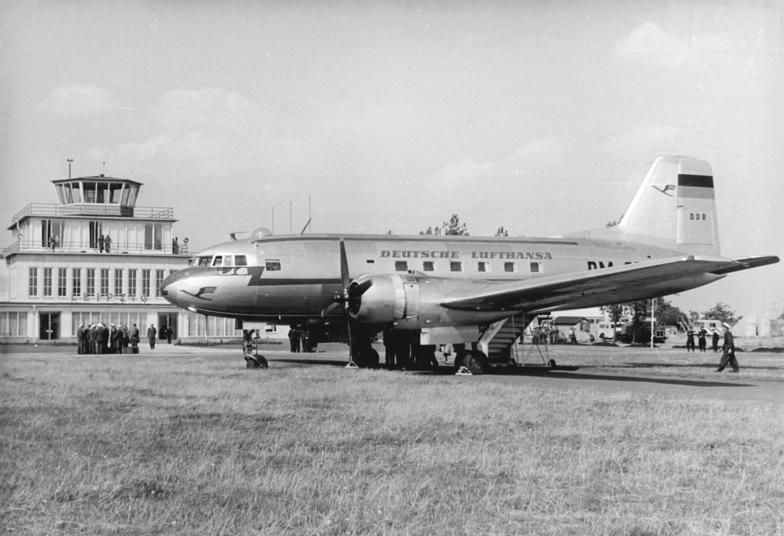
An Ilyushin Il-14 at Leipzig Airport in 1956)

On 27 April 1955, East Germany and the Soviet Union signed an agreement by which Berlin Schönefeld Airport was transferred to civilian use; since 1945, it had been operated by the Soviet Army, with scheduled passenger flights having been operated by Aeroflot. As a consequence, the Council of Ministers of the GDR decided to set up a national East German airline, a move which was finalized on 1 July with the appointment of the company's initial management committee. "Deutsche Lufthansa" was chosen as the name for the airline (previously, it had been used by Deutsche Luft Hansa, the German flag carrier from 1926 to 1945), even though the brand rights had been purchased by West German Luftag in 1954, which renamed itself accordingly (Luftag's flight operations only began on 1 April 1955, after it has been renamed Lufthansa). The East German Deutsche Lufthansa was formally established in July.

Deutsche Lufthansa acquired a fleet of Ilyushin Il-14 aircraft, which were initially operated by Soviet crews. The first flight of the airline took place on 15 September 1955, by which East German prime minister Otto Grotewohl travelled to Moscow for a state visit. Scheduled international flights were launched on 4 February 1956 with the inauguration of the East Berlin-Moscow service. In the same year, the route network was expanded to include Sofia. On 28 March 1960, the Ilyushin Il-18 (a four-engine turboprop airliner) was put into service.

Because of the usage of the Lufthansa branding, the company was sued by West German Lufthansa. As a side effect, the East German airline was prevented from being admitted into the International Air Transport Association (it could not become a member of the International Civil Aviation Organization either, because at that time neither East nor West Germany had been accepted into the United Nations). On 1 September 1963, the staff, fleet, and route network of Deutsche Lufthansa were transferred to Interflug, which had been founded as a state-owned charter airline in 1958 and served as the East German flag carrier thenceforth.

== Route network ==
Deutsche Lufthansa served the following destinations on a scheduled basis. As airline code for its flight numbers, DH was used.

Country	City	Airport	Commenced	Ceased
Albania	Tirana	Tirana Airport	c. 1960	
Bulgaria	Sofia	Sofia Airport	1956	
Czechoslovakia	Prague	Ruzyně Airport	1956	
East Germany	Barth	Barth Airport	1958	
East Germany	East Berlin	Schönefeld Airport (hub)	1956	
East Germany	Dresden	Klotzsche Airport	1958	
East Germany	Erfurt	Erfurt Airport	1958	
East Germany	Karl-Marx-Stadt	Jahnsdorf Airfield	1958	c. 1960
East Germany	Leipzig	Leipzig/Halle Airport	1956	
Hungary	Budapest	Ferihegy Airport	1956	
Poland	Warsaw	Okęcie Airport	1956	
Romania	Bucharest	Băneasa Airport	1956	
Soviet Union	Moscow	Vnukovo Airport	1956	
Soviet Union	Vilnius	Vilnius Airport	1956	c. 1960
Yugoslavia	Belgrade	Belgrade Airport	c. 1960	
