= Berline (airline) =

German airline

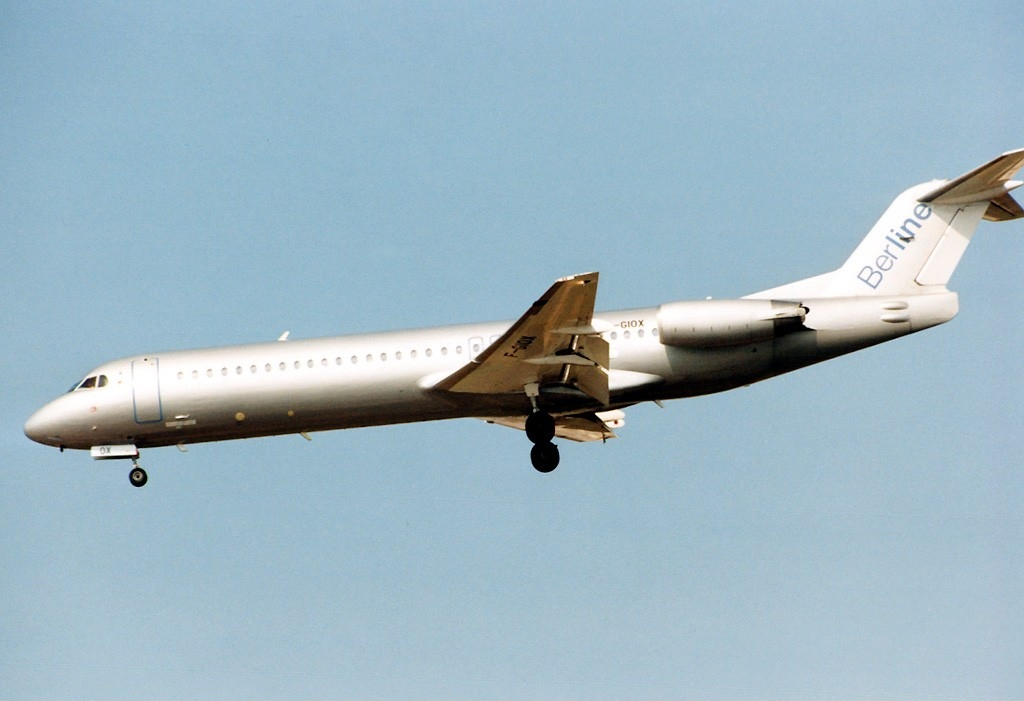
- Fokker 100
IATA	ICAO	Call sign
BZ	TBL	-
- Founded: February 21, 1991 as Il 18 Air Cargo GmbH
- Commenced operations: 1991 as Il 18 Air Cargo GmbH
- Ceased operations: March 31, 1994
- Operating bases: Berlin Schönefeld Airport
- Headquarters: Berlin, Germany

Berline (legally incorporated as Berlin-Brandenburgisches Luftfahrtunternehmen GmbH) was a German airline that operated cargo and holiday charter flights out of its base at Berlin Schönefeld Airport. It had approximately 90 employees.

== History ==
=== Foundation ===
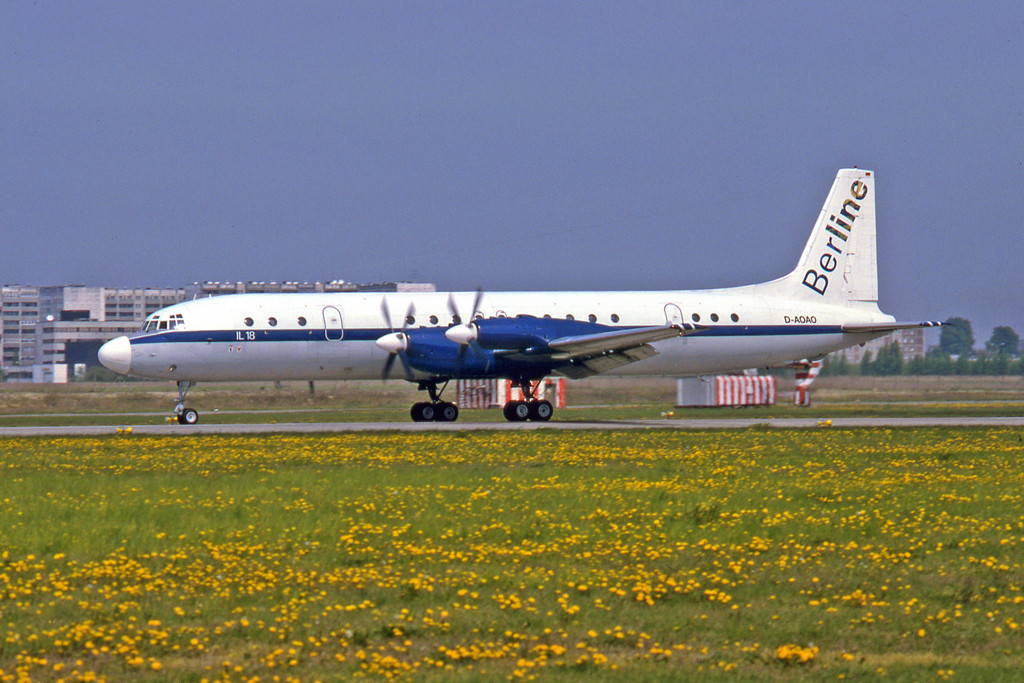
Ilyushin Il-18

Following the failed privatization and subsequent decision by Treuhandanstalt to liquidate loss-making former East German state airline Interflug in early 1991, a group of former employees acquired five of Interflug's ageing Ilyushin Il-18 turboprop aircraft and founded Il-18 Air Cargo GmbH, an airline ready to fly freight services.

On 2 November 1991, the name was changed to Berline, and the airline commenced passenger charter flights from Berlin-Schönefeld Airport to holiday resorts in the Mediterranean basin, thus continuing the Interflug tradition. In 1992 and 1993, two more modern Fokker 100 airliners were added to the fleet, all leased from a foreign airline.

=== Closure ===
After several investors withdrew and a subsequent credit freeze, Berline experienced financial problems. On 31 March 1994, the company filed for bankruptcy and immediately ceased all flight operations. Plans to restart operations were not successful, and on 28 October of that year, Berline was officially shut down.
