= Interflug Flight 1107 =

1975 aviation accident in East Germany

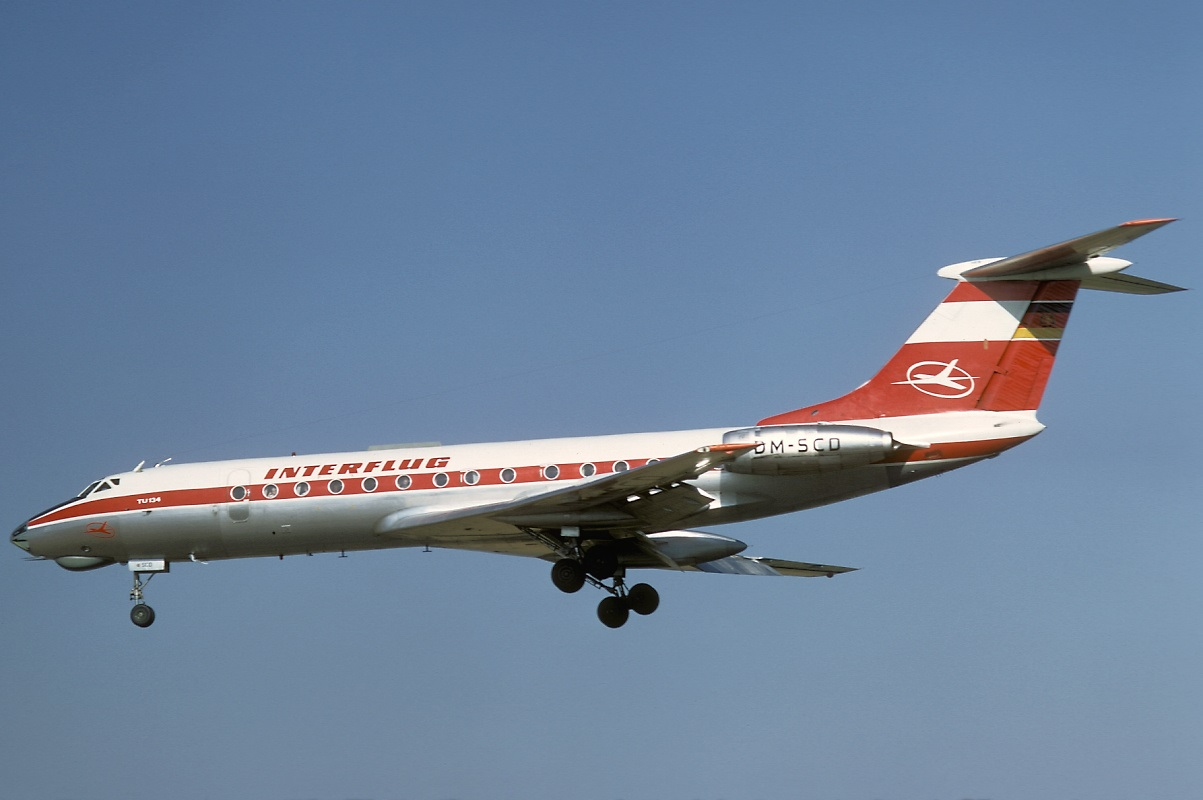
- DM-SCD, the aircraft involved in the accident, seen in 1974

Accident
- Date: 1 September 1975
- Summary: Controlled flight into terrain
- Site: Leipzig/Halle Airport

Aircraft
- Aircraft type: Tupolev Tu-134
- Operator: Interflug
- IATA flight No.: IF1107
- ICAO flight No.: IFL1107
- Call sign: INTERFLUG 1107
- Registration: DM-SCD
- Flight origin: Stuttgart Airport
- Destination: Leipzig/Halle Airport
- Passengers: 28
- Crew: 6
- Fatalities: 27
- Survivors: 7

Interflug Flight 1107 was a flight operated by East German airline Interflug from Stuttgart in West Germany to Leipzig in East Germany. On 1 September 1975 a Tupolev Tu-134 operating on the route crashed during its approach to Leipzig, killing 27 of the 34 passengers and crew on board.

== Accident ==
The aircraft descended with guidance from air traffic control using a precision approach radar. Despite this, the crew allowed the aircraft to descend too quickly and failed to check what was the decision height for Leipzig Airport. The Tu-134 struck a radio mast only 1 km from the runway threshold, broke apart into three pieces, ending up inverted. Three of the six crew and 24 of the 28 passengers were killed in the crash. The majority of the passengers were travelling to visit the Leipzig Trade Fair. The surviving crew members and the radar controller were all sentenced to prison terms as a result of the crash.
