= Klaus Henkes =

German soldier

- Born: July 29, 1929; Görlitz, Lower Silesia, Germany
- Died: March 7, 2003 (aged 73); Germany
- Occupations: general, airline executive

Klaus Henkes (29 July 1929, in Görlitz – 7 March 2003) was a German air force officer, civil transportation official, and airline executive.

He was a general in the East German Air Force and a deputy transport minister in the government from 1975 till 1990. Between 1978 and 1982 he was in charge of Interflug, the national airline of East Germany.

== Biography ==
=== Early years ===
Henkes was born into a working-class family in Görlitz, where, after leaving school relatively young, he studied for a career as a chemical laboratory assistant. At the end of World War II he was captured by the Soviets and was, according to one source, a prisoner of war between 1946 and 1949. He trained as a miner of lignite (brown coal) at Espenhain (near Leipzig) and, in 1948, became a member of East Germany's ruling Socialist Unity Party. By 1949 he had already reached the leading rank of "brigadier" with SAG Wismut, an important uranium mining company.

A period of further education followed when he studied at the Freiberg Mining Academy from 1949 till 1950, after which he returned to Wismut, where he worked till 1952.

=== Military training ===
In its early years, East Germany did not formally have a military; instead, it had quasi-military Barracked Peoples' Police (KVP/Kasernierte Volkspolizei), which included an air wing. Henkes volunteered on 23 May 1952, and was assigned to the secret "Lehrgang X" programme which trained approximately 220 East Germans at Syzran in the Soviet Union to be military pilots for East Germany's future air force.

After completing his training in 1953 he was appointed a pilot at the KVP flying school at the Bautzen flying centre, which later became the Officers' Training Base for Military Pilots. Between 1954 and 1955 he was sent on assignment as Senior Navigator of the forerunner organisation for East Germany's Air Force Command. In 1956, East Germany founded and openly proclaimed its long-planned National People's Army, which included all service branches, including the "People's Navy", the Air Force, and so on. Henkes was then sent for a lengthy period of training, which lasted till 1959, at the Gagarin Air Force Academy near Moscow.

=== Military career ===
From 1959 till 1961 Henkes served as a senior pilot with Air Force Command. Then, from 1961 till 1975, he was Deputy Chief of Staff for Flight Safety, Command Posts and Automation, still with Air Force Command, now based at Barnim military complex at Strausberg. During this time he was also, in 1967, awarded a doctorate in military science from Friedrich Engels Military Academy in Dresden.

On 1 March 1975 he was promoted to the rank of major general. This was also the year in which he was succeeded as Deputy Chief of Staff by Günter Hiemann and appointed a member of the government as Deputy Minister of Transport and Head of the Civil Aviation department in succession to Paul Wilpert.

In 1978 Henkes succeeded Kurt Diedrich in the top job at Interflug, East Germany's "flag carrier" airline. The appointment of an air force general to this position highlighted the close links between Interflug and the East German military. He remained at Interflug till 1982. On 2 October 1982 he was promoted again, now to the rank of lieutenant general.

=== Retirement ===
In 1989 he was awarded the National Prize of East Germany, and retired on 30 April 1990. He was also granted an invalidity pension.

== See also ==
- List of East German Air Force Generals (in German)
