= Abbey of Saint-Cyran-en-Brenne =

Abbey in Indre, France

Coordinates: 46.8061°N 1.1553°E

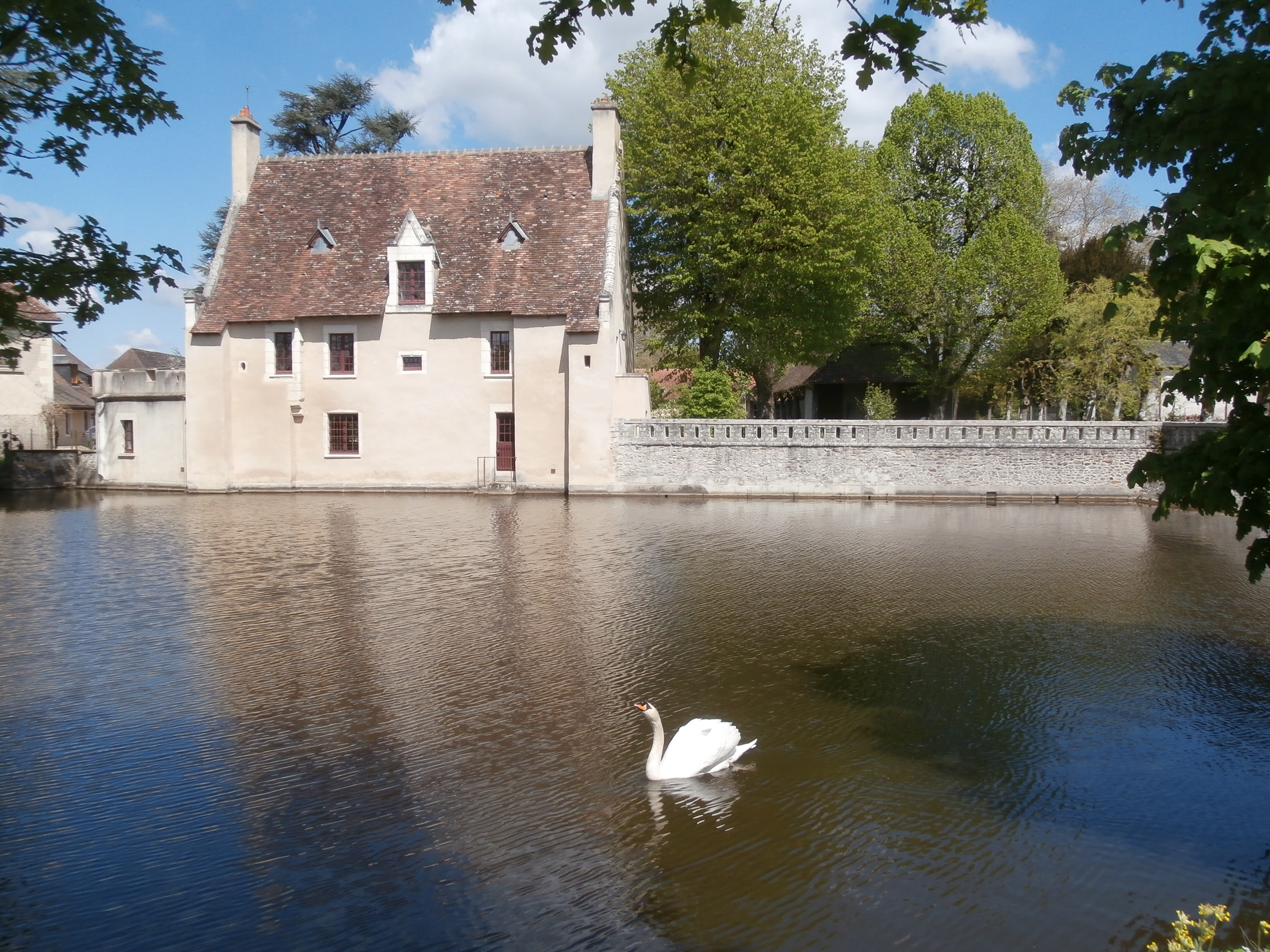
Abbey of Saint-Cyran-en-Brenne.

The Abbey of Saint-Cyran-en-Brenne, also known since 1975 as the Abbey of Saint-Michel-en-Brenne, and originally as Saint-Pierre de Longoret, is an abbey in the town of Saint-Michel-en-Brenne in France, previously in the province of Berry and now in the department of Indre.

== History ==
Sigiran(d) or Sigiramnus, later known as Saint Cyran, founded a monastery at Longoret around 632 CE on land offered to him by Dagobert I for that purpose. Dagobert frequently visited the monastery to hunt. The monastery, originally named Saint-Pierre de Longoret, later became an abbey and a royal foundation named after Saint Cyran. It kept Saint Cyran's relics, as well as those of saints Génitour, Sylvain and Fructueux, all of which were later re-housed in 1860 in a bronze reliquary.

In 1620 Jean Duvergier de Hauranne, who introduced Jansenism into France, became the abbey's commendatory abbot. Opposed to the Jesuits, he fell into disgrace under Cardinal Richelieu and was imprisoned. The abbey suffered from its association with his fall. It was officially suppressed in 1712 and destroyed on the orders of the archbishop of Bourges. The abbey's monks scattered and its goods were sold in 1739. The buildings were sold as state property in 1790, and all that remains of the main abbey buildings is the 15th-century chambre des hôtes. Some of its granges, stables and mills also survive. A few decades after 1790 Moulins de Paris bought it and later turned it into holiday homes for its employees.

The abbey was converted to have a more varied frontage. In June 1975 it was bought by Marcel Lefebvre's sister, who renamed it Saint-Michel Abbey and used it to house the sisters of the Society of St. Pius X. It protected Paul Touvier, fleeing from charges of crimes against humanity, until the police seized his baggage there on May 21, 1989.
