= Sigiramnus =

Saint Sigiramnus

Confessor
- Died: c. 655 AD
- Venerated in: Eastern Orthodox Church; Roman Catholic Church
- Feast: December 4; December 5

"Sigirannus” is also the name of a 7th-century abbot of St. Cales in the department of Sarthe.

Sigiramnus (also Sigirannus and similar spellings; French: Siran, Cyran; died c. 655 AD), also known as Saint Cyran, was an abbot and confessor of the 7th century. A nobleman of Berry, he studied at Tours and then joined the royal court of Clothaire II. He served as cup-bearer but always wore a hair-shirt underneath his garments, devoting himself to prayer.

His father, count of Bourges (and later bishop of Tours), wanted Sigiramnus to marry the daughter of a nobleman.

Refusing to marry, Sigiramnus took holy orders at the church of St. Martin at Tours in 625 AD, serving as archdeacon at Tours. He refused to gain high position in the secular world, and after his father died, he gave away his goods and money to the poor; he was locked away as a lunatic for this.

In 640, after he was released, he made a pilgrimage to Rome with Flavius, an Irish bishop. According to one account, as they crossed the diocese of Tours, he insisting on working in the fields with the serfs after he was “seized with compassion at the peasants covered with dust and sweat.”

When Sigiramnus returned to France, he founded two monasteries with land given to him by Clothaire in the diocese of Bourges: Saint-Pierre de Longoret (Longoretum, Lonrey) and Méobecq (Millepecus), in the forest of Brenne region of the Berry province.

Longoret was later renamed Saint-Michel-en-Brenne after him. He served as abbot of Longoret until his death in 655 AD.

== Veneration ==
A life of Sigiramnus was written in the ninth or tenth centuries; the author of this Life claims to have compiled it from an earlier text.

The monastery of Saint-Cyran was dissolved in 1712. Jean du Vergier de Hauranne (1581–1643), known as the Abbé of Saint-Cyran, took his title from this monastery.

Sigiramnus’ relics were kept at the abbey of Saint-Cyran until 1860, when Eugénie de Montijo, Empress consort of the French, encased them in a reliquary and gave it to the church of Saint-Michel-en-Brenne.
