= Interflug =

National airline of East Germany (1958–1991)

INTERFLUG Gesellschaft für internationalen Flugverkehr m.b.H.

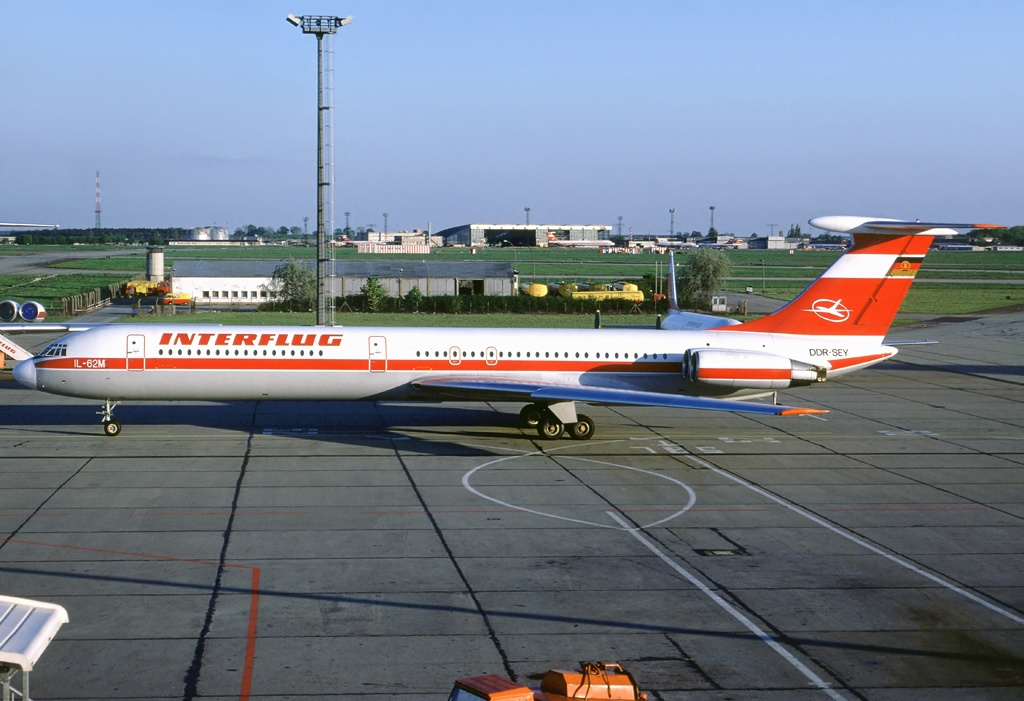
- An Interflug Ilyushin Il-62M, this aircraft would later crash as Aria Air Flight 1525
IATA	ICAO	Call sign
IF	IFL	INTERFLUG
- Founded: 18 September 1958
- Commenced operations: 1 September 1963
- Ceased operations: 30 April 1991
- Hubs: Berlin Schönefeld Airport
- Headquarters: Schönefeld, Brandenburg, East Germany

Interflug GmbH (German: INTERFLUG Gesellschaft für internationalen Flugverkehr m.b.H.; [ˈɪntɐfluːk]) (Note: Although it was state-owned, Interflug was not organized as a VEB.) was the national airline of East Germany (officially the “German Democratic Republic”) from 1963 to 1991. Based in East Berlin, it operated scheduled and chartered flights to European and intercontinental destinations out of its hub at Berlin Schönefeld Airport, focusing on Comecon countries. Interflug also had significant crop dusting operations. Following German reunification, the company was liquidated in 1992.

== History ==
=== Founding years ===
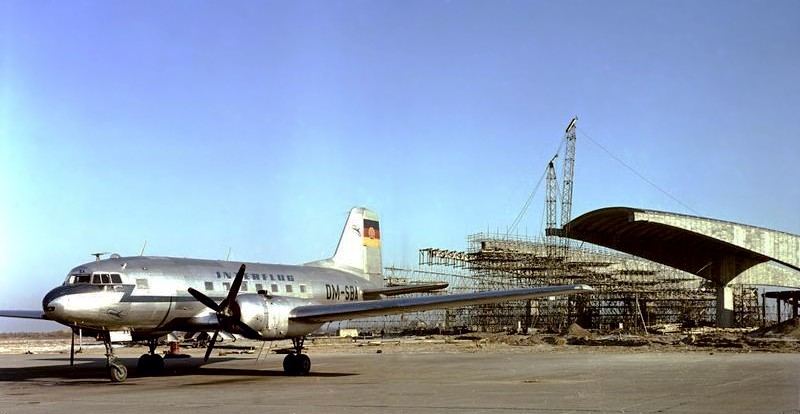
An Ilyushin Il-14 at Schönefeld airport in 1961, when the terminal building was under construction

Until 1945, Deutsche Luft Hansa had served as German flag carrier. Following the end of World War II and the subsequent allied occupation of Germany, all aircraft in the country were seized and the airline was liquidated. In 1954, a West German company acquired the Lufthansa trademark. In 1955, Deutsche Lufthansa was founded as a rival East German flag carrier. It soon became obvious that the East German airline would likely lose a lawsuit over the use of the Lufthansa branding. As a result, Interflug was set up on 18 September 1958 as a "backup" company, initially intended to complement the East German aviation industry by operating chartered flights. In 1963, the East German Lufthansa was liquidated, officially due to poor profitability (though this step foreclosed the imminent stripping of the Lufthansa name). Its staff, aircraft fleet, and route network were transferred to Interflug, which henceforth served as the East German flag carrier.

=== East German national airline ===
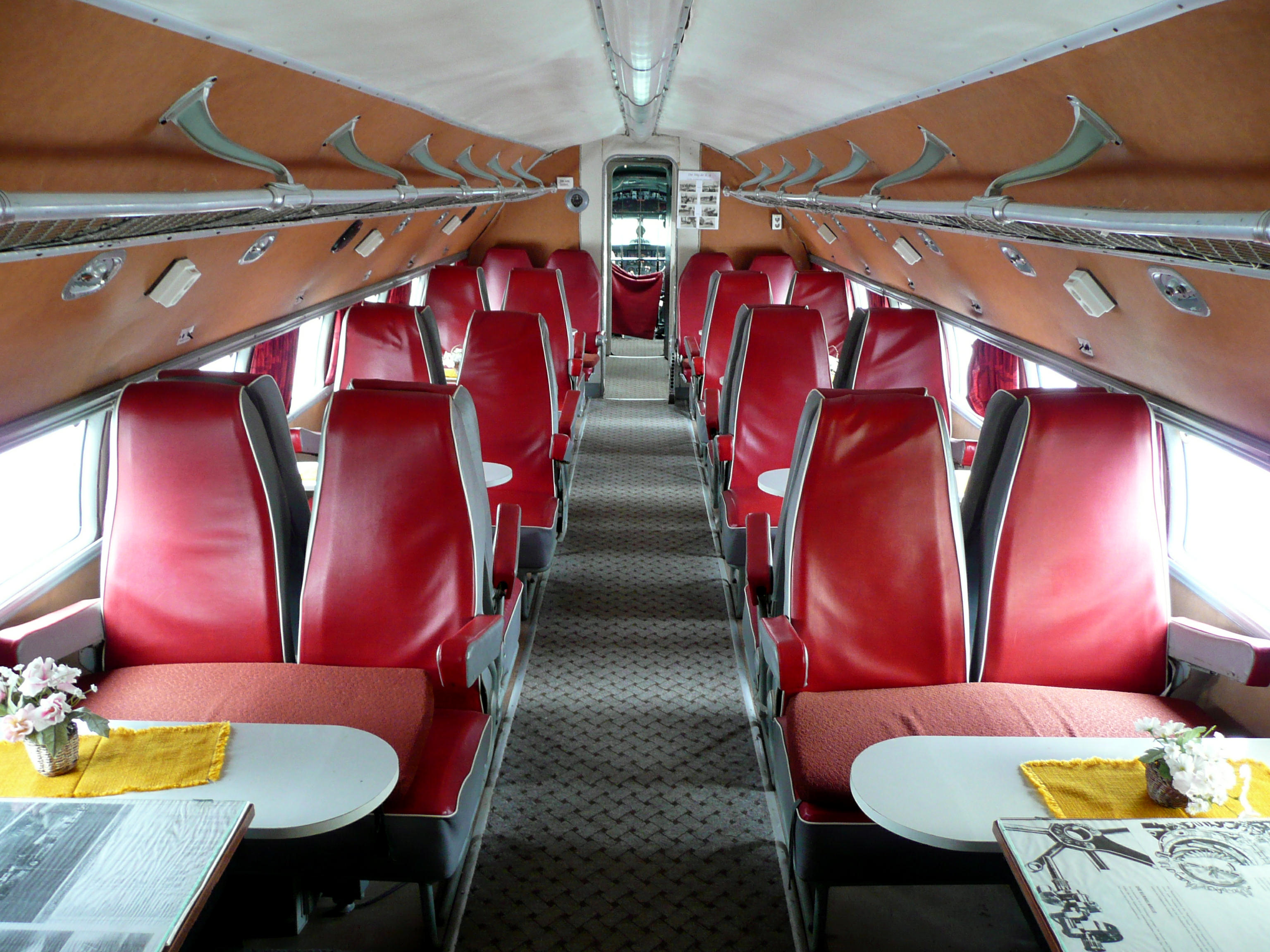
Interior view of a preserved Ilyushin Il-14.

As a state-owned airline, Interflug and its approximately 8,000 employees were under the control of the National Defense Council, in supreme command of the East German armed forces. The majority of Interflug pilots were reserve officers of the National People's Army (and as such were required to be members of the Socialist Unity Party), and its aircraft could be requisitioned for military purposes at any time. Klaus Henkes, who became General Director of the airline in 1978, had previously served as General of the East German Air Force. Applicants for flight attendant jobs had to be approved of by the Stasi, which assessed their political reliability, in an attempt to minimize espionage and defection to Western countries. Interflug crews who associated with employees of airlines from non-socialist countries risked suspension. Each flight crew was assigned a political officer who gave political lectures during flights.

The airline's route network and fleet of Soviet-built aircraft grew significantly in the 1960s. The Ilyushin Il-18 turboprop airliner became the workhorse of Interflug's short-haul flights during that period. The company had been the intended primary operator of the Baade 152, an early jet airliner constructed in East Germany. Its development never went beyond the prototype phase and was abandoned in 1961. In 1969, the Tupolev Tu-134 was introduced, the first jet airliner operated by Interflug, used on European routes. The long-range Il-62 joined the fleet in 1971. That same year, the number of Interflug passengers reached 1 million. At its peak, Interflug flew to destinations such as Havana, Cuba, Singapore and Conakry, Guinea.

As a result of the 1970s energy crisis and increasing fuel prices, Interflug gradually dismantled its domestic route network. The last scheduled domestic flight, to transport prisoners from East Berlin to Erfurt, took place in April 1980.

=== Late 1980s and German reunification ===
During the 1980s, Interflug's aging fleet caused increasing difficulties: fuel efficiency was inferior to that of contemporary western airliners, and noise pollution regulations meant the airline had to pay higher landing fees and was even banned from operating at some airports. With some exceptions, (Note: Romanian airlines TAROM and LAR) Western-built airliners (most notably those produced by Boeing, McDonnell Douglas, and Airbus) could not be delivered to Soviet bloc countries because of the CoCom embargo. Following a deal between Boeing and LOT Polish Airlines for the purchase of six Boeing 767 aircraft, and in order to acknowledge the Perestroika movement, commercial airliners were exempted from the trade embargo in 1988. Malév Hungarian Airlines also bought Boeing aircraft in 1988, and later that year, Interflug placed an order for three Airbus A310 long-haul aircraft, worth DM 420 million. The deal was secured with the support of Franz Josef Strauss, then Minister-President of Bavaria, chairman of the Airbus supervisory board and responsible for West German loans to East Germany.

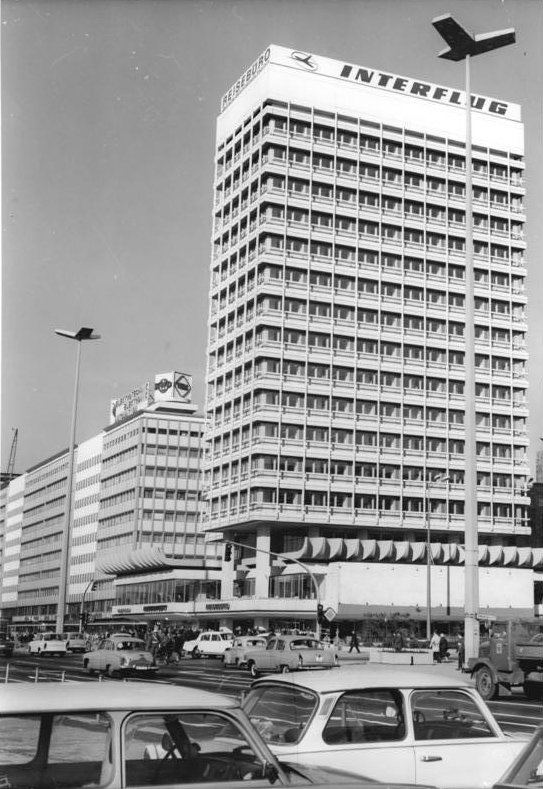
Interflug office Haus des Reisens near Alexanderplatz in central East Berlin, 1971, now FITX building

Interflug's first Airbus A310 was delivered on 26 June 1989. The East German crews for the new aircraft type were trained in West Germany; aircraft maintenance was also performed there. The A310 enabled non-stop flights to Cuba (flights had previously required a fuel stop at Gander International Airport in Canada).

Following the fall of the Berlin Wall on 9 November 1989 and the subsequent political upheaval in East Germany, several airlines expressed interest in buying parts of the highly unprofitable company to secure a share of the German air traffic market, especially in Berlin. In early March 1990, Lufthansa signed a letter of intent to acquire 26 percent of Interflug, but the offer was blocked by Germany's Federal Cartel Office. Plans for a takeover by British Airways did not materialize either (the UK airline instead founded Deutsche BA in 1992). On 1 July 1990, Interflug became a member of the International Air Transport Association (IATA).

As a consequence of German reunification on 3 October 1990, Interflug came under the administration of the Treuhandanstalt, along with all other East German state property. As no buyers could be found, the liquidation of Interflug, which had 2,900 employees and 20 aircraft at the time, was announced on 7 February 1991. The airline was then dismantled. The last commercial flight (on the Berlin-Vienna-Berlin route, using a Tu-134) took place on 30 April 1991 after which all employees were fired.

== Legacy ==
Following the liquidation, a group of former Interflug employees acquired five of the company's Ilyushin Il-18 airliners and set up Il-18 Air Cargo, which soon became known as Berline, operating chartered cargo and leisure flights out of Schönefeld Airport. The company went bankrupt and ceased operations in 1994. All employees were fired.

The three Airbus A310 purchased by Interflug in 1988 were handed over by the Treuhandanstalt to the Federal Republic of Germany and became part of the German Air Force, used for VIP transport of high-ranking politicians like the German president or chancellor.

Several former Interflug aircraft have been preserved in different places in Germany.

== Route network ==
As the national airline of East Germany from 1963 to 1991, Interflug operated scheduled passenger flights to the following destinations. (Note: This list does not include chartered flights to holiday destinations or to airports in West Germany for the annual Leipzig Trade Fair, nor cargo operations.)

Country	City	Airport	Commenced	Ceased
Albania	Tirana	Tirana International Airport Nënë Tereza	1963	
Algeria	Algiers	Maison Blanche Airport	ca. 1966	
Austria	Vienna	Vienna International Airport	ca. 1970	1991
Bangladesh	Dhaka	Tejgaon Airport	ca. 1977	
Belgium	Brussels	Brussels Airport	ca. 1982	
Bulgaria	Burgas	Burgas Airport	ca. 1982	
Bulgaria	Sofia	Vasil Levski Sofia Airport	1963	1991
Bulgaria	Varna	Varna Airport	ca. 1977	1991
China	Beijing	Beijing Capital International Airport	1989	1991
Cuba	Havana	José Martí International Airport	ca. 1975	1991
Cyprus	Larnaca	Larnaca International Airport	ca. 1977	1991
Cyprus	Nicosia	Nicosia International Airport	ca. 1966	1974
Czechoslovakia	Bratislava	Bratislava Airport	ca. 1973	
Czechoslovakia	Poprad	Poprad–Tatry Airport	ca. 1977	
Czechoslovakia	Prague	Prague Ruzyně International Airport	1963	1991
Denmark	Copenhagen	Copenhagen Airport	ca. 1970	1991
Egypt	Cairo	Cairo International Airport	ca. 1966	1991
Finland	Helsinki	Helsinki Airport	ca. 1977	1991
East Germany	Barth	Stralsund–Barth Airport	1963	1977
East Germany	East Berlin	Berlin Schönefeld Airport (hub)	1963	1991
East Germany	Dresden	Klotzsche Airport	1963; 1990	ca. 1978; 1991
East Germany	Erfurt	Erfurt–Weimar Airport	1963	1980
East Germany	Heringsdorf	Heringsdorf Airport	1963	1979
East Germany	Leipzig	Schkeuditz Airport	1963	1991
West Germany	West Berlin	West Berlin Tegel Airport	1973	
West Germany	West Berlin	West Berlin Tempelhof Airport	1973	
West Germany	Cologne	Cologne Bonn Airport	1990	
West Germany	Düsseldorf	Düsseldorf Airport	1989	
West Germany	Hamburg	Hamburg Airport	1990	
Greece	Athens	Ellinikon International Airport	1979	1991
Guinea	Conakry	Conakry International Airport	ca. 1966	
Hungary	Budapest	Budapest Ferenc Liszt International Airport	1963	
Iraq	Baghdad	Baghdad International Airport	1963	
Israel	Tel Aviv	Ben Gurion Airport		1991
Italy	Milan	Milan Linate Airport	ca. 1980	1991
Italy	Rome	Rome Fiumicino Airport	ca. 1980	1991
Lebanon	Beirut	Beirut–Rafic Hariri International Airport	1963	
Libya	Tripoli	Tripoli International Airport	ca. 1982	1991
Mali	Bamako		ca. 1966	
Malta	Valletta	Malta International Airport		1991
Mozambique	Maputo	Maputo International Airport	ca. 1975	
Netherlands	Amsterdam	Amsterdam Airport Schiphol	ca. 1977	1991
Nigeria	Lagos	Murtala Muhammed International Airport	ca. 1982	ca. 1991
Pakistan	Karachi	Jinnah International Airport	ca. 1977	
Poland	Warsaw	Warsaw Chopin Airport	1963	1991
Romania	Bucharest	Bucharest Băneasa Aurel Vlaicu International Airport	1963	1991
Singapore	Singapore	Changi Airport	1988	
Soviet Union	Kyiv	Boryspil International Airport	ca. 1982	
Soviet Union	Leningrad	Pulkovo Airport	ca. 1977	1991
Soviet Union	Minsk	Minsk National Airport	ca. 1982	
Soviet Union	Moscow	Vnukovo Airport; Sheremetyevo Airport	1963	1991
Sweden	Stockholm	Stockholm Arlanda Airport	ca. 1982	1991
Syria	Damascus	Damascus International Airport	ca. 1966	
Thailand	Bangkok	Don Mueang International Airport	1989	1991
Tunisia	Monastir	Monastir Airport		1991
Tunisia	Tunis	Tunis–Carthage International Airport	ca. 1982	1991
Turkey	Istanbul	Atatürk Airport	ca. 1977	1991
United Arab Emirates	Dubai	Dubai International Airport		1991
Vietnam	Hanoi	Gia Lam Airport	ca. 1975	1978
Vietnam	Hanoi	Noi Bai International Airport	ca. 1978	1991
Yugoslavia	Belgrade	Belgrade Nikola Tesla Airport	1963	1991
Yugoslavia	Ljubljana	Ljubljana Airport	ca. 1982	
Yugoslavia	Split	Split Airport	ca. 1982	
Yugoslavia	Zagreb	Zagreb Airport	ca. 1966	1991

=== Flights to Western countries ===
A map showing the border crossings between West and East Berlin. The checkpoint at Waltersdorfer Chaussee could only be used by West Germans travelling to and from nearby Schönefeld Airport (click to enlarge).

As an East German state-owned company, Interflug had the important role of securing foreign currency reserves, as the East German mark was considered a weak currency. For most of its existence, Interflug was not a member of the International Air Transport Association (IATA), and could therefore significantly undercut the ticket prices of other European carriers. From the 1970s, more effort was put into operating chartered flights to Mediterranean and Black Sea holiday resorts, many of which specifically catered to West Germans (travel restrictions applied to East Germans). Starting in that period, Interflug gained traffic rights to several destinations in Western Europe. All these flights could be booked at travel agencies in West Berlin and West Germany, which had signed sale contracts with Interflug. To simplify the transfer of passengers from West Berlin to and from Schönefeld Airport, a dedicated border crossing checkpoint was inaugurated at Waltersdorfer Chaussee, and scheduled shuttle buses were operated from the Central Bus Terminal in the Westend locality.

By the early 1980s, low Interflug ticket prices led to a severe decline in holiday flights at Berlin Tegel Airport in West Berlin. Pilots at Pan Am, which had a hub at Tegel, reportedly considered operating flights to Greece without pay to allow the airline to compete with Interflug.

Interflug signed an agreement with Turkish Airlines giving the two airlines exclusive rights to offer dedicated flights for Turkish Gastarbeiter to and from West Germany and West Berlin. In the 1980s, Interflug set up a partnership with KLM for a joint operation on the East Berlin-Amsterdam route. Of the six weekly flights, two were operated by KLM's Fokker F28 Fellowships, and four by Interflug's Tu-134s and Il-62s. As neither airline was allowed to cross the intra-German border, (Note: The three air corridors crossing the border between East and West Germany could only be used by airlines of the Western Allies (the United States, United Kingdom, and France) and by LOT Polish Airlines.) the KLM flights were routed via Denmark, and Interflug used a southern routing over Czechoslovakia.

During the annual Leipzig Trade Fair, at that time considered the most important meeting place for businesspeople and politicians from both sides of the Iron Curtain, Lufthansa and Interflug were granted special permits to operate flights between Leipzig and West Germany. In 1986, Lufthansa and Interflug applied for joint traffic rights for year-round scheduled intra-German flights over the Iron Curtain, which were initially rejected by the Western Allies (likely due to concerns that their unique market position for flights to and from Berlin might be weakened), and only granted in August 1989. Interflug was then able to launch flights on the Leipzig-Düsseldorf route, while Lufthansa began serving the Frankfurt-Leipzig leg. In 1990, Interflug added flights from Dresden to Hamburg and Cologne.

== Fleet ==
Over the years, Interflug operated the following aircraft types on its commercial flights: (Note: The table does not include aircraft (including helicopter) types operated for agricultural and military purposes by the East German state, some of which were painted in Interflug colors.)

Aircraft type	Introduced	Retired
Aero Ae-45	1956	1961
Airbus A310	1989	1991
Antonov An-2	1957	1962
Antonov An-24	1966	1975
Dash 8-100 (Note: A single aircraft of the type had been leased from Tyrolean Airways.)	1990	1991
Let 410UVP		1991
Ilyushin Il-14	1955	1967
Ilyushin Il-18	1961	1991
Ilyushin Il-62	1970	1991
Tupolev Tu-124		
Tupolev Tu-134	1969	1991
Tupolev Tu-154M (Note: Operated by the Air Forces of the National People's Army for government VIP charters.)	1989	1991

A fleet list published in December 1980 included the following; Tu-134 (five), Tu-134A (26, including 11 configured for VIP use), Il-18 (fourteen), Il-62 (eight), plus 263 "Agricultural types".

== Gallery ==
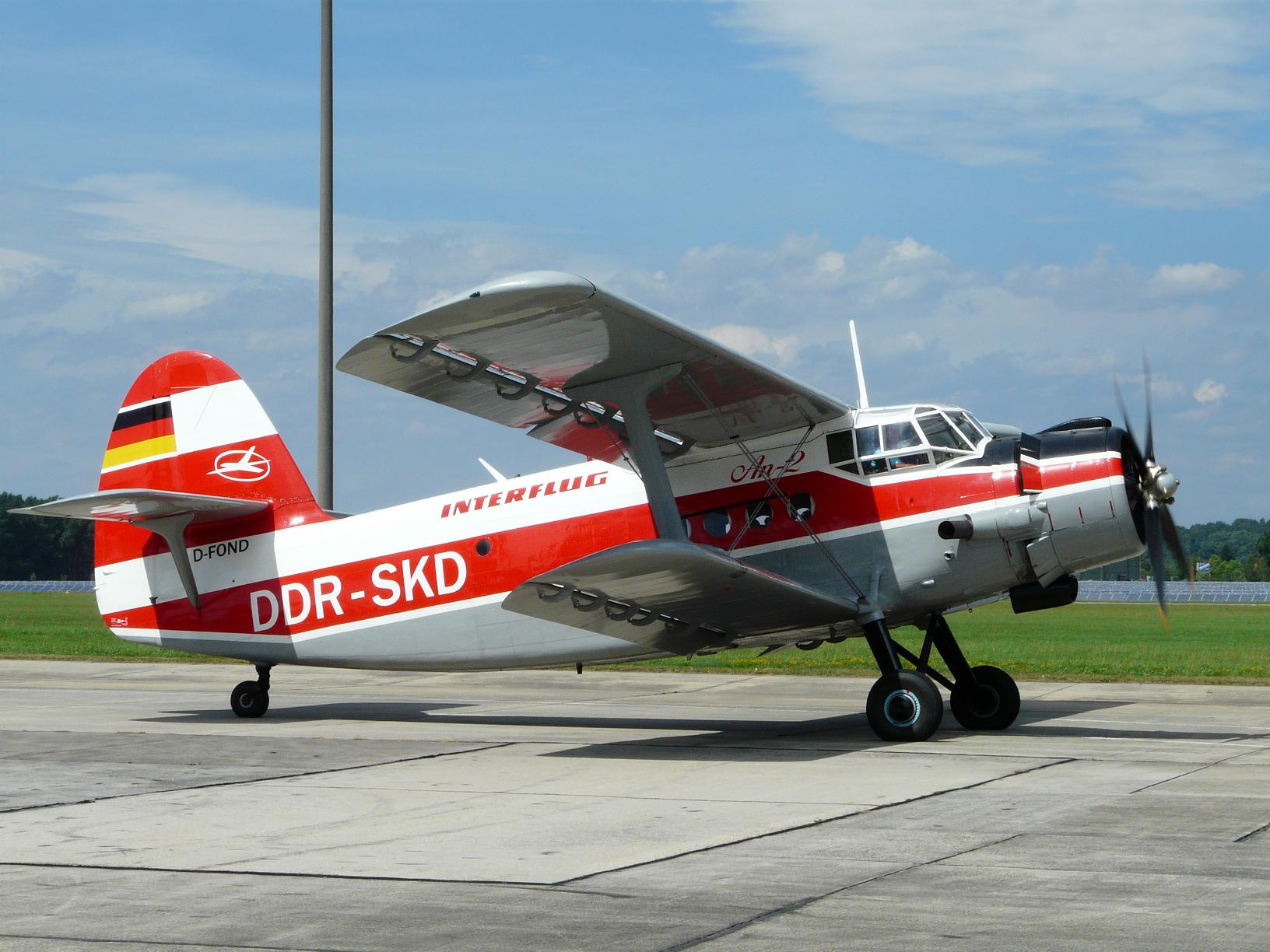
Antonov An-2

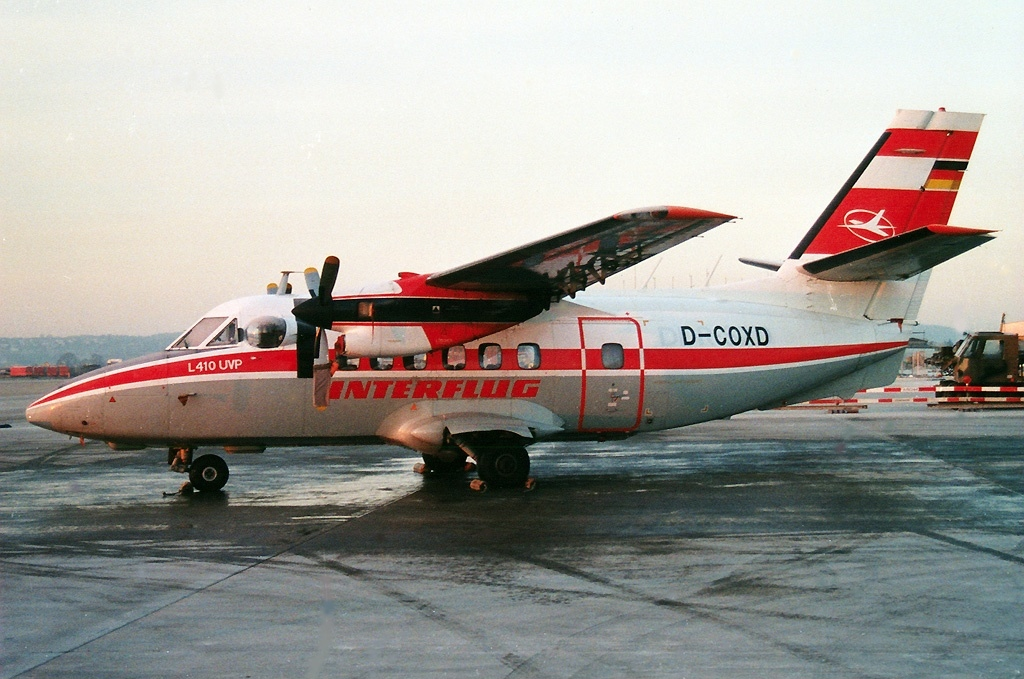
Let-410UVP

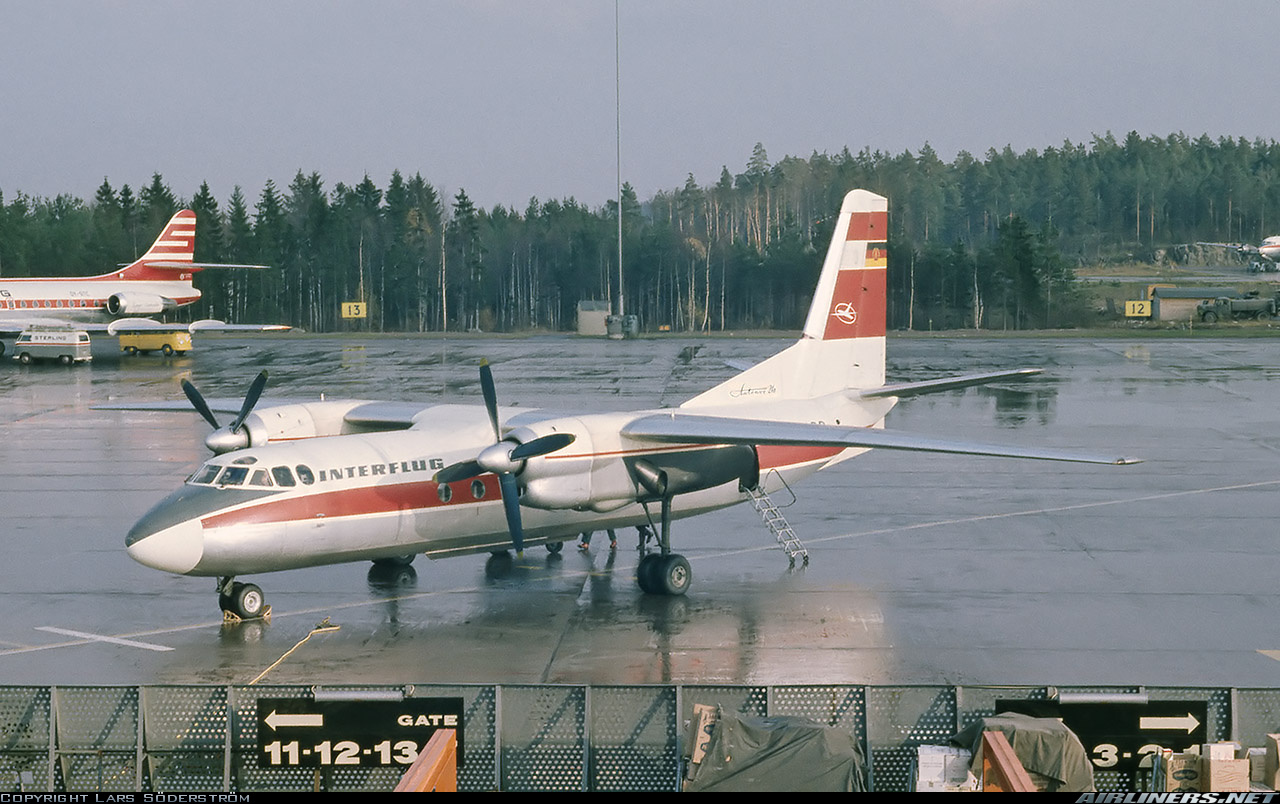
Antonov An-24V

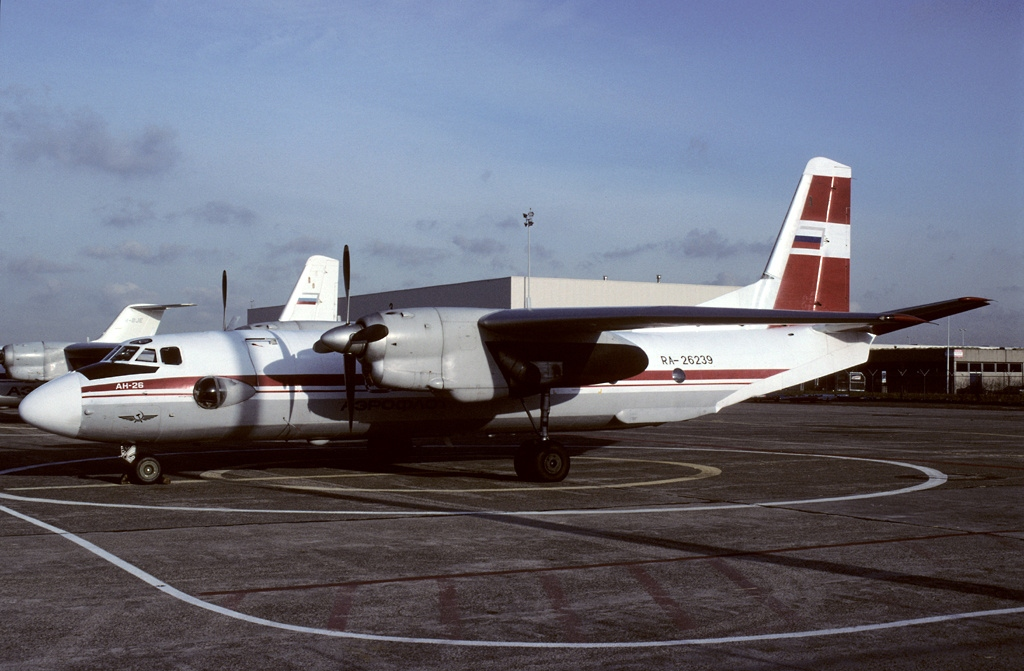
Antonov An-26T

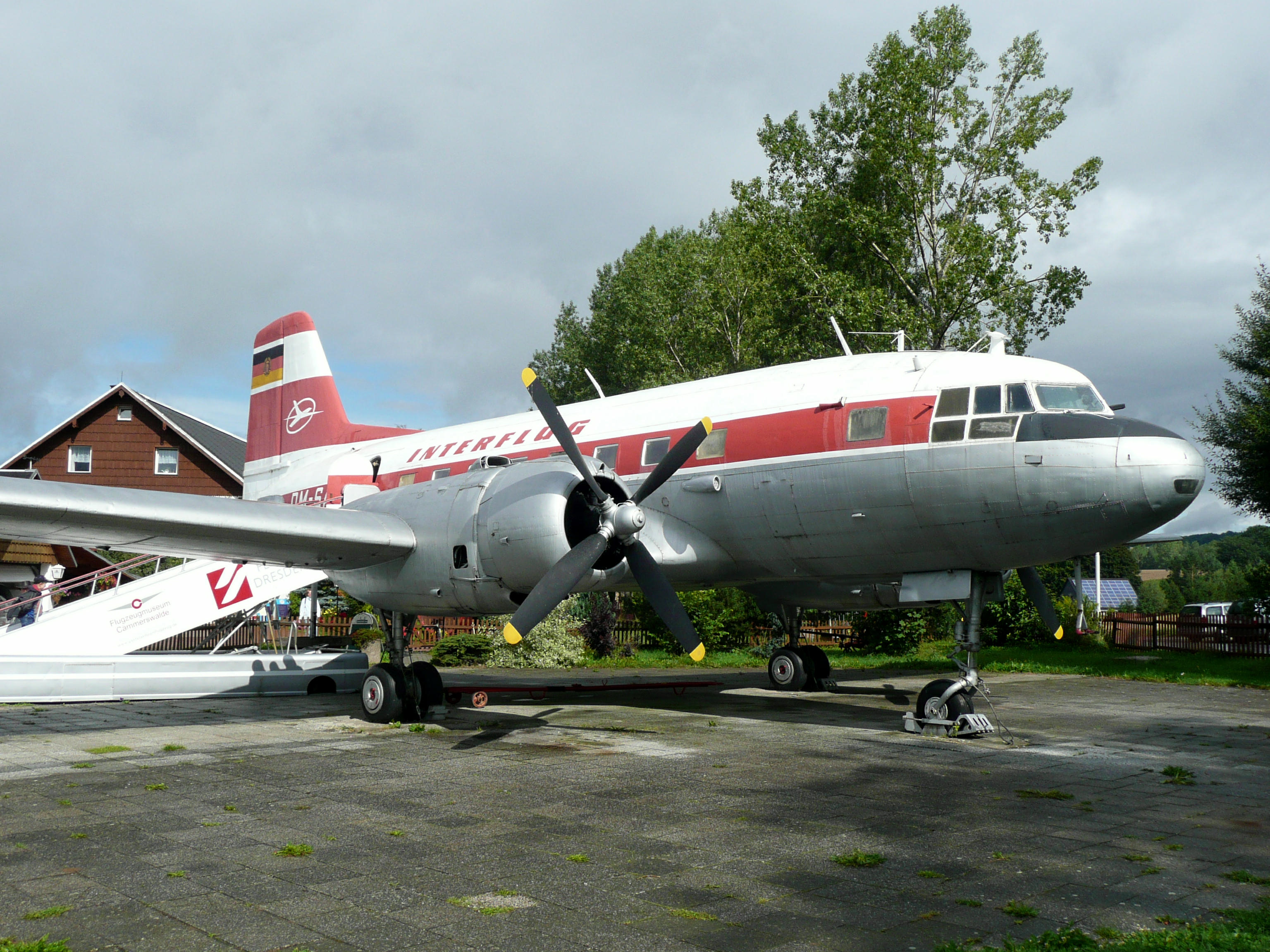
Ilyushin IL-14

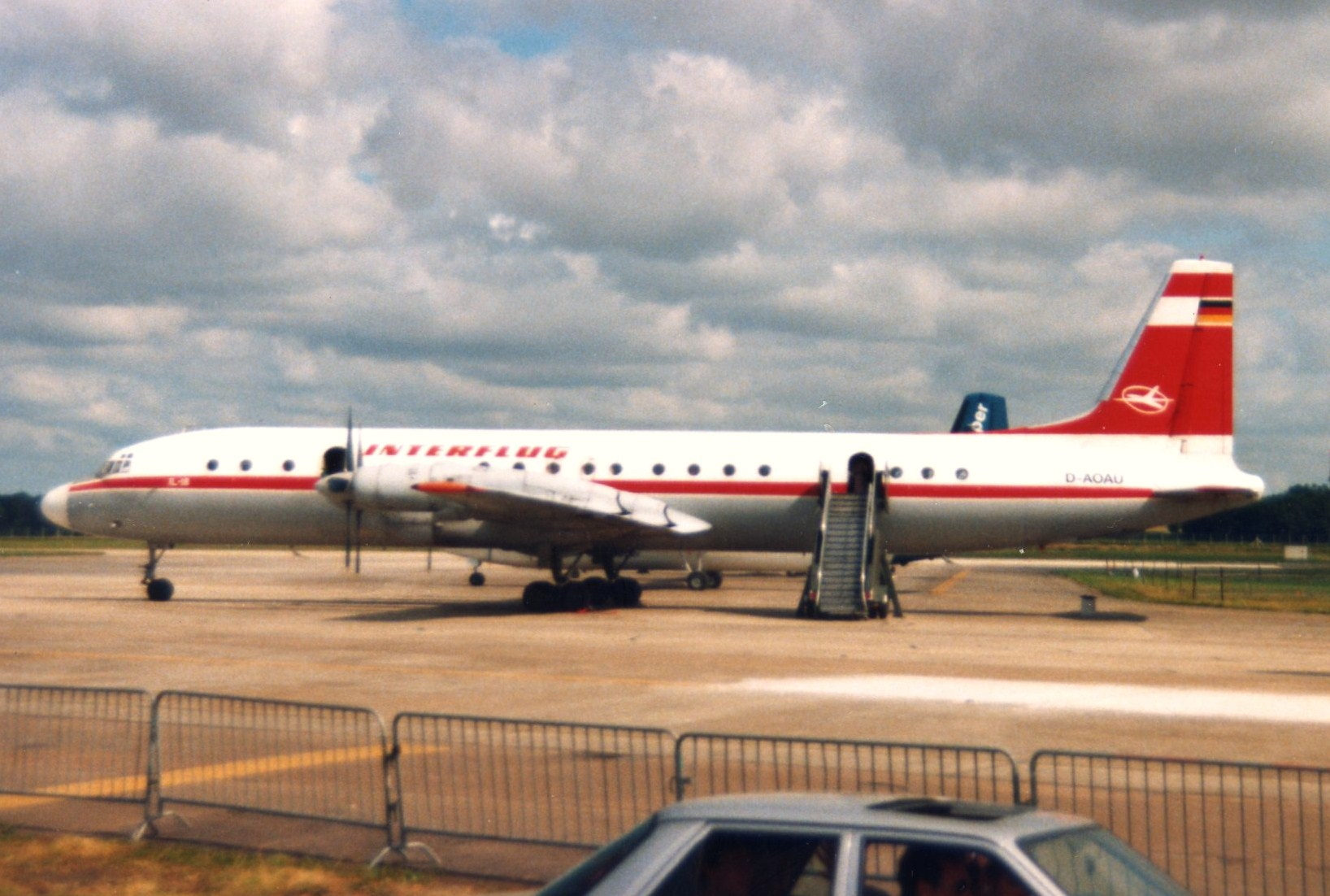
Ilyushin IL-18

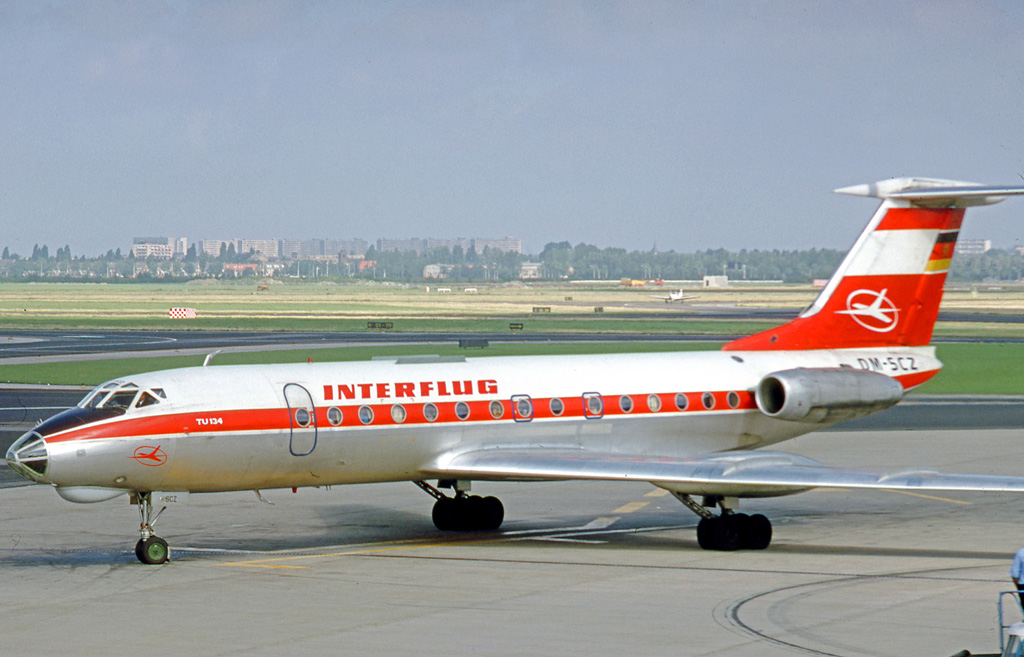
Tupolev Tu-134

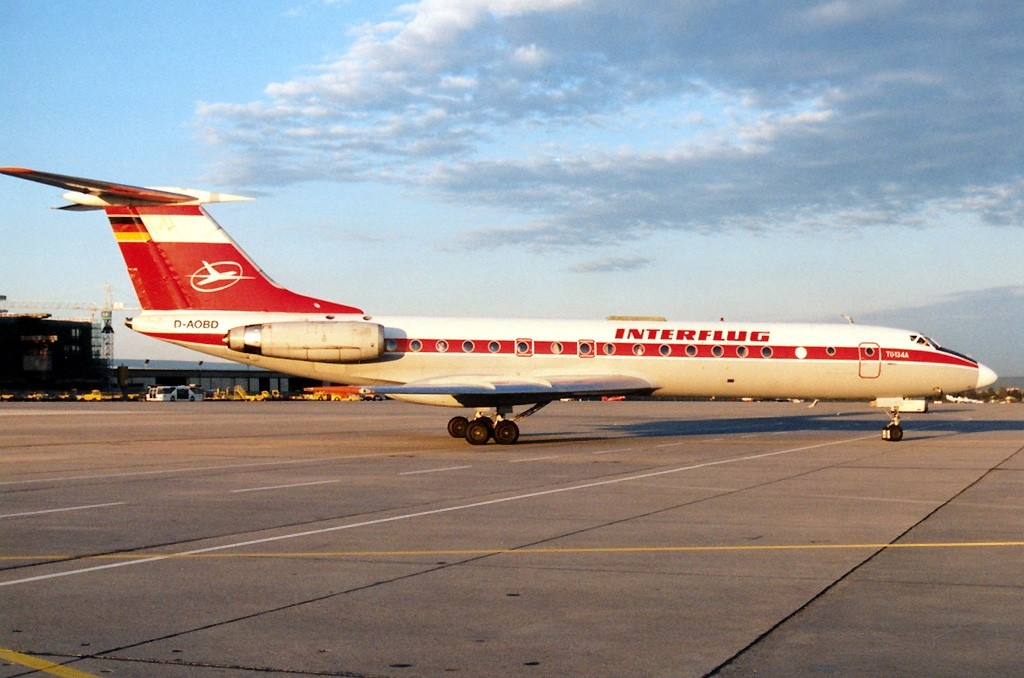
Tupolev Tu-134A

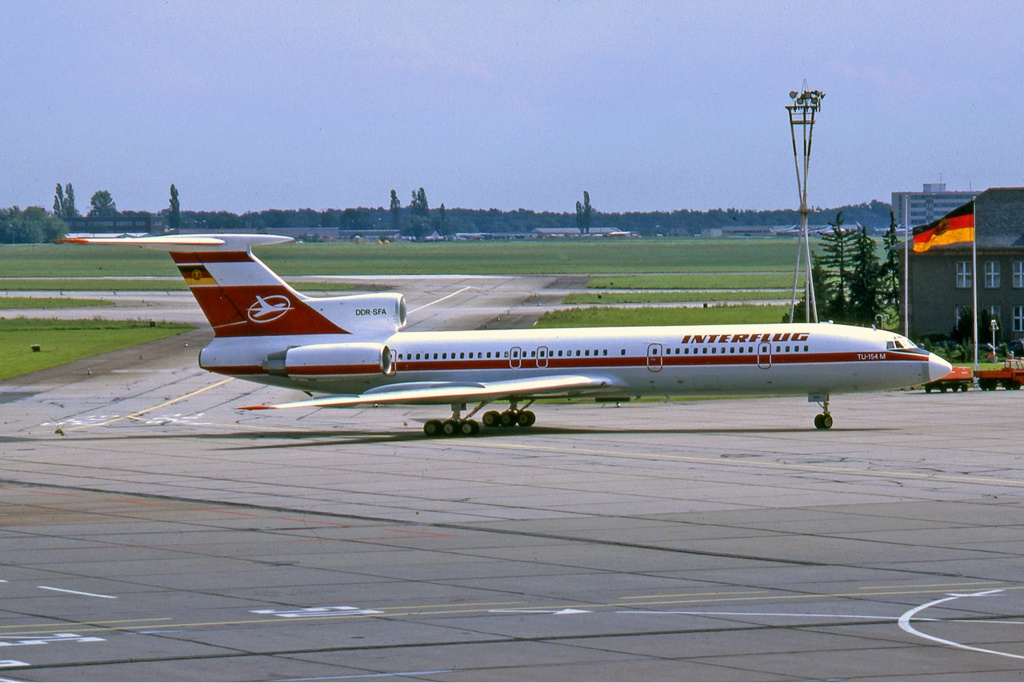
Tupolev Tu-154M

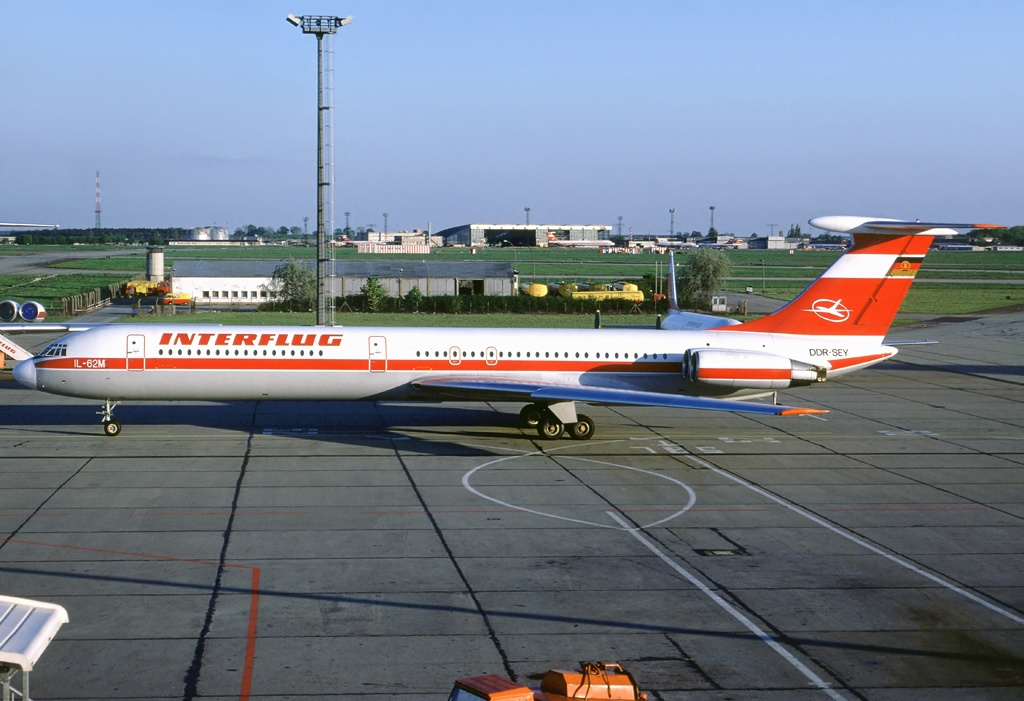
Ilyushin Il-62M

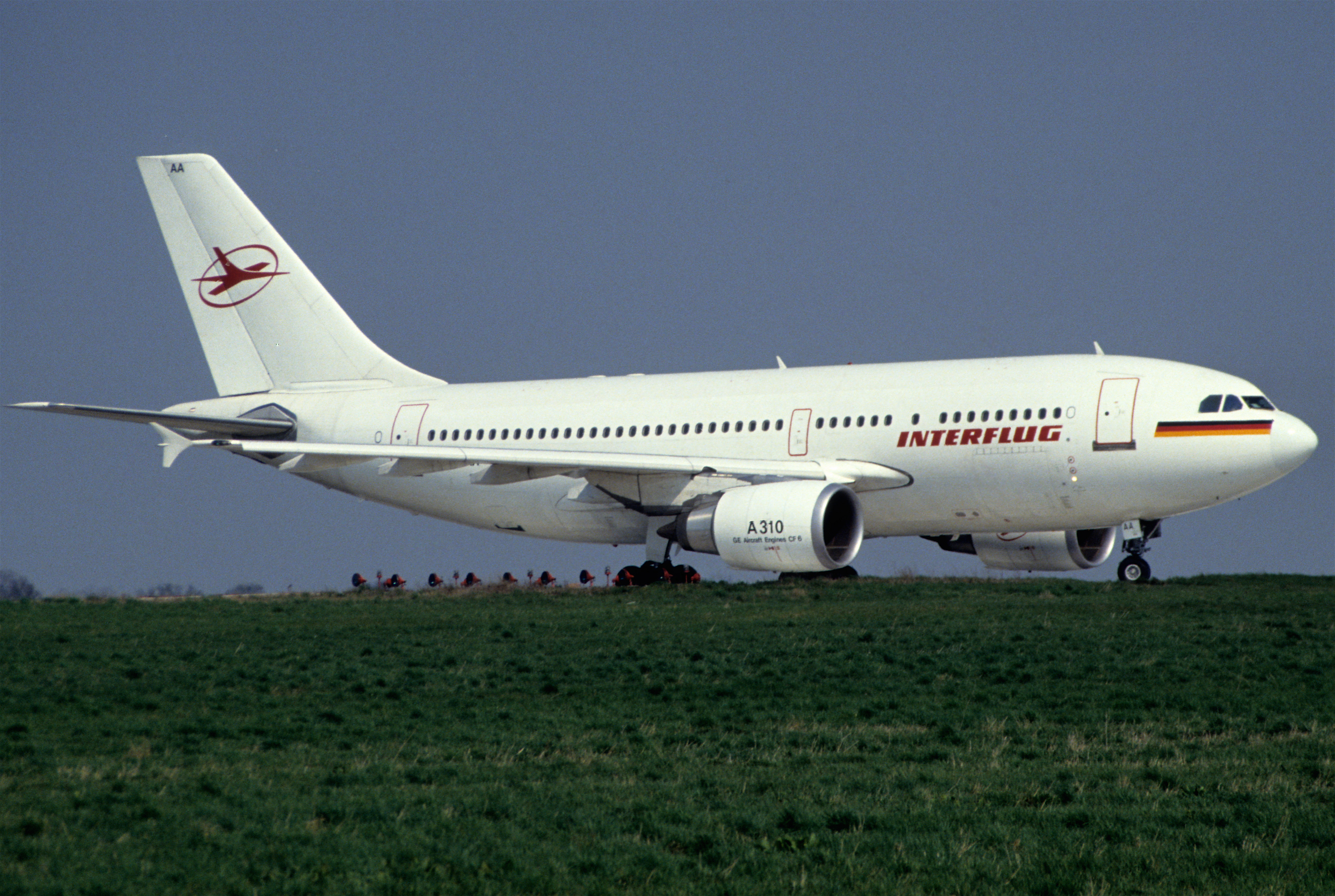
Airbus A310-304

== Accidents and incidents ==
=== Fatal ===
- On 26 July 1964, an Interflug Antonov An-2 (registered DM-SKS) crashed near Magdeburg; the two occupants died.
- Interflug Flight 450, the deadliest to date in Germany with 156 fatalities (and second-deadliest in the world at the time, only surpassed by All Nippon Airways Flight 58) occurred on 14 August 1972, when an Interflug Ilyushin Il-62 (registered DM-SEA), then one of the world's largest passenger jets, crashed during an emergency landing attempt near Schönefeld Airport. The aircraft, registered DM-SEA, was the first Il-62 operated by Interflug. Shortly into a Berlin-Burgas flight, the aircrew encountered problems with the elevators caused by a fire in the cargo bay, which destroyed part of the rear fuselage. The aircrew subsequently tried to return to the airport but the tail detached, sending the airplane into an uncontrolled descent.
- On 1 September 1975, an Interflug Tupolev Tu-134 (registered DM-SCD) crashed during its approach into Leipzig/Halle Airport; 27 of the 34 people on board died (three crew and four passengers survived). The aircraft had been travelling from Stuttgart, West Germany, to Leipzig (such flights were only operated during the Leipzig Trade Fair). It was later determined that the pilots had not properly checked the aircraft's altitude, leading to a descent below the glide slope and a collision with an antenna mast.
- On 26 March 1979, a cargo-configured Interflug Ilyushin Il-18 (registered DM-STL) overshot the runway at Luanda Airport in Angola following an engine failure during the take-off run. The aircraft broke up, erupted into flames and all ten people on board died.
- On 17 June 1989, an Ilyushin Il-62 (registered DDR-SEW) operating Interflug Flight 102 to Moscow overshot the runway during a take-off attempt at Schönefeld Airport and caught fire. 21 of the 103 passengers on board and one person on the ground died (all ten crew members survived). The accident started when a rudder jammed because of a locking tab that had been left in place during maintenance. When instructed to apply reverse thrust, the flight engineer mistakenly switched the engines off. Because the accident occurred on the anniversary of the 1953 East German uprising, the resulting tense atmosphere in the GDR initially led to suspicions of sabotage, delaying medical assistance to survivors.

=== Non-fatal ===
- On 7 December 1963, an Interflug Ilyushin Il-14 (registered DM-SBL) belly-landed near Königsbrück following total electrical failure; all 33 on board survived.
- On 22 November 1977, an Interflug Tu-134 (registered DM-SCM) on a flight from Moscow was damaged beyond repair in a landing accident at Schönefeld Airport. The aircraft, with 74 people aboard, crashed into the runway due to an excessive sink rate caused by faulty handling of the autopilot.
- On 11 February 1991, Interflug's scheduled Berlin-Moscow flight was involved in a go-around incident at Sheremetyevo Airport. The captain of the Airbus A310 (registered D-AOAC) disagreed with the flight computer settings for the go-around, and the resulting opposite control inputs from the flight computer caused a total of four stalls, including one that pitched the aircraft up to 88 degrees (nearly vertical). The pilots eventually recovered control and landed the aircraft. Taking place after the crash of an Airbus A320 during a 1988 demonstration flight, the incident further demonstrated the danger of aircrews inadvertently or deliberately countermanding automatic safety protocols built into modern jetliners.

=== Criminal incidents ===
- On 10 March 1970, a hijacking attempt occurred on an Interflug flight from East Berlin to Leipzig. Armed with pistols, a young husband and wife, Eckhard and Christel Wehage, demanded the pilot fly the Antonov An-24 – which had 15 other passengers on board – to Hanover in West Germany to escape the Iron Curtain. The pilot claimed not to have enough fuel, and the Wehages agreed to fly to Tempelhof Airport in West Berlin. The plane returned to Schönefeld Airport instead, leading the Wehages to kill themselves.
- A similar hijacking attempt failed during an Interflug flight from Erfurt to East Berlin on 30 January 1980.
- On 20 December 1980, Interflug Flight 302 from East Berlin to Budapest was subjected to a bomb threat. En route, a handwritten note was discovered claiming a bomb was hidden on the Tupolev Tu-134 and would be triggered once the aircraft descended below 600 metres (2,000 ft). The crew decided to divert to Poprad, a Czechoslovak airport located at an elevation of 718 metres (2,356 ft). Upon landing a backpack was discovered which did not belong to any of the passengers. No information was released about its contents.

== In popular culture ==
- The East German TV series Treffpunkt Flughafen was produced between 1985 and 1986. In eight episodes, it deals with the fictional crew of an Interflug Ilyushin Il-62, and their (often negative) experiences and adventures in foreign countries, which the average East German citizen either could not afford or was not allowed to visit.
- The intentional landing of a former Interflug Ilyushin Il-62 on a 900-metre (3,000 ft) long grass runway in Gollenberg on 23 October 1989 received widespread media attention. The aircraft, donated by the airline, was commanded by Heinz-Dieter Kallbach and has been preserved there ever since to commemorate aviation pioneer Otto Lilienthal.

== InterCondor ==
- After West and East Germany reunited, Interflug planned to start a joint-venture airline with Condor Flugdienst named InterCondor. InterCondor's fleet was to consist only of Boeing 757s. Due to the liquidation of Interflug in 1990, the project airline was abandoned.
