= Walter Rossow =

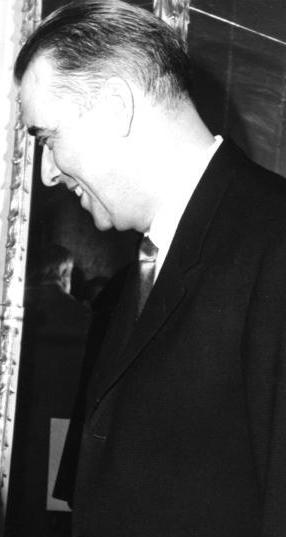
- Walter Rossow at a televised award ceremony in 1966
- Born: 28 January 1910; Berlin-Rixforf, Prussia, Germany
- Died: 2 January 1992; Berlin, Germany
- Occupation(s): Landscape architect University professor
- Spouse: Helga von Hammerstein-Equord (1913-2005)
- Children: none
- Parents: Richard Rossow (father); Elise Geishardt (mother)

Walter Rossow (28 January 1910 – 2 January 1992) was a leading German Landscape architect and, during his later years, a university professor. After 1945, together with leading architects of the time such as Egon Eiermann and Paul Baumgarten, Walter Rossow played a key role in reconstructing Berlin.

== Life ==
=== Provenance and early years ===
Walter Rossow was born in the (subsequently renamed) Berlin inner-city district of Rixdorf. The boy's interest in garden design was awakened at an early age, and encouraged in particular by one of his teachers, Friedrich Haak. Haak himself later came to prominence as a pioneer of Berlin's city "Gartenarbeitsschulen" ("Gardening schools"), which retain a particular resonance in a city where the abundance of flat damp ground has enforced a large amount of green space in and around the city centre. In 1926, in defiance of the wishes of Richard Rossow, his father, Walter Rossow embarked on a two-year apprenticeship with the Berlin City Gardens Department. Between 1928 and 1930 he pursued an autodidactic course of further study by working as an assistant gardener at a succession of locations across Berlin Schleswig-Holstein and Frankfurt am Main. In 1930 he started a two-year course of study at the "Lehr- und Forschungsanstalt für Gartenbau (LuFA)", a long-established training institute for gardening and horticulture that had relocated in 1903 from a former royal park to Berlin-Dahlem. He emerged from his time at the "LuFA" with a qualification as a "gardens technician". It was also in 1932 that he began to attend lectures at the Berlin University of the Arts, not as a student of it but on an agreed "guest listener" basis, while also working as a landscape gardener at various locations in Berlin.

The early 1930s saw intensifying political polarisation in Germany, which spilled increasingly onto the streets. Polarisation was reflected after 1930, and more acutely after 1932, in a deadlocked national parliament. Through contacts established through the "Wandervogel" (conservative youth group) Rossow became increasingly interested in literature and the arts. But in the context of those times it was hard to avoid becoming, in addition, politically aware: Rossow and his friends were critical of the rising tide of National Socialism. Meanwhile, Rossow tried to find a more permanent position as a horticultural architect, but failed on account of the Great Depression and its continuing unemployment crisis that had hit Europe after the 1929 Wall Street Crash.

=== Hitler years ===
During the first part of 1933 he therefore accepted a job with Martha Willings, a well known "garden technician" in Berlin. The two of them worked well together, and in 1934 the business of "Willings & Rossow" came into being. In January 1935 the partnership was added to the membership records of the "Deutsche Gesellschaft für Gartenkunst" (DGfG). However, following the regime change of January 1933 Germany had been transformed into a one-party dictatorship. Whether through choice or circumstance, the business of "Willings & Rossow" was not particularly active during the Hitler years. Walter Rossow's political instincts were left-liberal, and he rejected National Socialism categorically, both through conviction and on account of his personal circumstances.

War broke out in September 1939. Rossow was classified as unfit for military service due to a lung disease, and was therefore not conscripted into the army. That left him time to focus more in the "Willings & Rossow" garden services business. In 1940 or 1941 he bought out his partner's share to become sole proprietor and "Geschäfsführer" (managing director) of it, while remaining in contact with his friend and former business partner, Martha Willings. Meanwhile, in February 1937 he joined the government-backed "National Chamber of Visual Arts ("Reichskammer der bildenden Künste") as a "garden designer". (Many found such moves to be inescapable preconditions for continuing to work in their chosen professions.) During the early 1940s, as the government's appetite for political and race-driven persecution intensified, control of the gardening business provided Rossow with opportunities for a certain amount of discrete assistance to persecution victims and to those engaged in anti-government resistance.

=== Helga ===
Walter Rossow married Helga von Hammerstein-Equord (1913-2005) on 7 June 1939. Helga entered her marriage as both the holder of a newly acquired postgraduate doctoral qualification in Chemistry and a clandestine member (or former member) of the Communist Party of Germany. She came from a family of minor but traditionally influential aristocrats: slightly unusually, her father's family were Protestants while her mother's family were Catholics: both Helga's parents came from army families. The father-in-law whom Rossow acquired through his marriage was Kurt von Hammerstein-Equord, before 1934 a close friend of President von Hindenburg and a career soldier with a distinguished military record on his own account. Baron von Hammerstein-Equord had served, between 1930 and 1934, as "Chief of the Army Command" ("Chef der Heeresleitung"). Two of Helga's younger brothers, Kunrat and Ludwig were certainly aware in advance of the planned assassination attempt against the leader in July 1944. After Hitler survived the attack, Kunrat and Ludwig - who were also being sought by the authorities as "army deserters" at the time - went into hiding and managed to evade capture. Other family members, including Rossow's mother-in-law and his wife, were among those arrested and detained during August 1944. Helga's detention lasted only a few weeks, however.

=== After the war ===
Between 1945 and 1948 Rossow was given charge of the department for open spaces in the American sector of Berlin. This involved a massive exercise in restoration and reconstruction. (The city had been divided into four separately administered zones of military occupation although there were no physical barriers, at this stage, preventing Berliners from walking freely between them.) In addition to this generalised responsibility for the green spaces in the south-western quarter of Berlin, he also accepted an appointment as provisional head of the city gardens department, located in Berlin-Zehlendorf. The work involved working closely with the city planning officer Hans Scharoun (1893–1972), already one of Germany's most respected architects. Other regular participants in the meetings presided over by Scharoun included city planners and architects such as Hubert Hoffmann, Wils Ebert, Luise Seitz (1910–1988) and Roland Rainer, along with the landscape architect Reinhold Lingner. At these meetings a range of alternative perspectives for rebuilding Berlin were discussed and perfected. They later also gave rise to what became the 1957 "Internationale Bauausstellung" (Interbau buildings exhibition).

In December 1949 the architects Hans Scharoun and Max Taut joined with the cultural polymath Edwin Redslob to relaunch a Berlin-centred version of the old Deutscher Werkbund, which had been closed down in 1934 under the dictatorship. There was a renewed commitment to the 1907 founding objectives for "humanisation" of design, whether affecting the home, city planning and construction or the nurturing both of the countryside and of the landscaped environment. That meant a conscious rejection of dehumanising "Nazi architecture". There was a focus on intensifying individual responsibility for social and cultural development. Rossow was closely involved from the outset, accepting an invitation to serve as deputy president under Heinrich Tessenow between 1949 and (formally) 1951. After Tessenow died at the end of 1950, Rossow took over as president of the Werkbund, serving without a break between 1951 and 1969.

In 1948, with most of the rubble cleared away and the slow rebuilding of the city underway, Rossow began to receive freelance commissions for garden architecture projects. It was also in 1948 that he took a job lecturing at the Architecture Faculty of the Berlin Fine Arts Academy, which turned out to be the launch pad for a parallel teaching career in the German universities sector. In 1952 he accepted an extraordinary professorship at the academy. A particularly important commission which he directed involved the reconstruction of the Tiergarten Park during 1950/51. Rossow worked mainly in West Berlin. Throughout the 1950s and 1962, as economic recovery, he participated in numerous landscape architecture competitions together with architects such as Hans Hoffmann, frequently with great success. Earlier he had worked with Bruno Taut on the large Siedlung Schillerpark residential development in Berlin-Wedding. The development later achieved the rare distinction of becoming part of a UNESCO World Heritage Site Between 1954 and 1957 Rossow served as a member of the steering committee masterminding the "Internationale Bauausstellung" (Interbau buildings exhibition). In terms of his later reputation and lasting influence on "greenspace architecture", his careful design for the outdoor space surrounding the German pavilion for the 1958 World fair in Brussels. The pavilion itself was designed by Sep Ruf from Munich and Egon Eiermann from Karlsruhe. The simplicity and clear proportions of the layout and construction, together with the consistent application of quality standards, won plaudits internationally. Another high-profile commission, in 1960, was for the layout of the greenspaces in and around the Berlin Arts Academy complex at Berlin-Hansaviertel for Werner Düttmann, the modernist lead architect on the project.

Probably Rossow's most important work, and according to some commentators most impressive work outside Germany as a landscape architect, was on the construction, between 1962 and 1967, of the German War Cemetery, overlooking the summit of the Futa Pass, between Bologna and Florence. He worked alongside fellow landscape gardener-architect Ernst Cramer, the architect Dieter Oesterlen and the sculptor Helmut Lander. The project followed lengthy government-level negotiations between West Germany and Italy (Note: Abkommen vom 22. Dezember 1955 zwischen der Bundesrepublik Deutschland und der Italienischen Republik über Kriegsgräber.) and the gathering of the mortal remains from former battlefields, cemeteries and other more ad hoc locations across central Italy, of more than 30,000 soldiers believed killed in combat .

Walter Rossow held a number of visiting professorships in West Germany. In October 1966 he was appointed Professor and Director for Landscape Planning by the Faculty for Architecture and Urban Planning at the Technical University of Stuttgart. He retained the combined post till his retirement in 1975. He went on to serve between 1976 and 1986 as Director of the Architecture Department at the Berlin Arts Academy.

Walter Rossow died at Berlin a few weeks short of what would otherwise have been his 82nd birthday.

== Memberships and recognition (selection) ==
Walter Rossow was a member of the Deutscher Werkbund in Berlin and, in 1961, one of the co-signatories of the strangely prescient Green Charter of Mainau.

- 1958: Berlin Critics' Prize for visual arts
- 1963: Paul Bonatz Architecture Prize, Stuttgart
- 1966: Berlin Art Prize for Architecture
- 1971: Fritz Schumacher Prize, Hannover
- 1972: Order Pour le Mérite
- 1974: Knight Commander's Cross (West Germany -"Großes Verdienstkreuz mit Stern")
- 1975: Friedrich Ludwig von Sckell Ring of Honour from the Bavarian Fine Arts Academy
- 1985: Honorary Doctorate from the Technical University of Darmstadt
