= Raticosa pass =

Mountain pass in Florence, Italy

- Passo della Raticosa, Radicosa Pass, Passo Radicosa, Passo di Radicosa
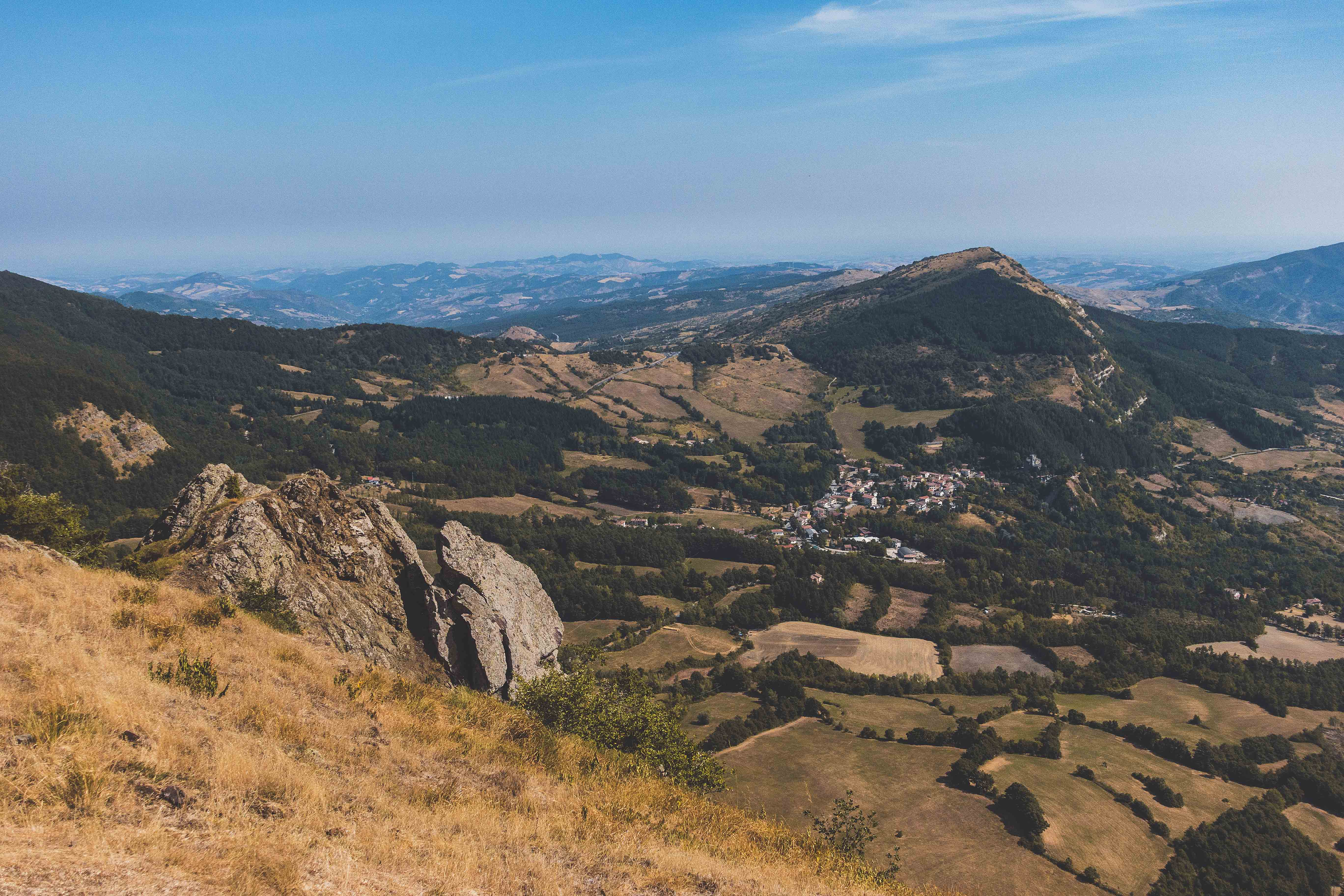
- The Raticosa Pass and the nearby town of Pietramala seen from Monte Beni

- Location within Italy
- Elevation: 968 metres (3,176 ft)
- Traversed by: Strada Statale 65

Third Approach
- Location: Firenzuola
- Range: Apennines
- Coordinates: 44°10′22″N 11°20′18″E

The Raticosa pass (Italian: Passo della Raticosa) is a mountain pass in the Tuscan-Emilian Apennines with an elevation of 968 m (3,176 ft) above sea level. It is located close to the small town of Pietramala in the municipality of Firenzuola, which forms part of the Metropolitan City of Florence (Tuscany). Surrounding peaks include the Canda hill (901 m), Mount Canda (1158 m), Mount Beni (1264 m), and Mount Oggioli (1290 m), the source of the Idice, a river that runs into Emilia-Romagna where it feeds the Reno.

The Raticosa is traversed by the strada statale (SS) 65 at a point about 12 km north of the Futa pass. Before the advent of the Autostrada del Sole in 1964, the strada della Futa – as the road is commonly known in Italian – was for two centuries the main thoroughfare connecting Florence and Bologna. Fully viable from 1762, it was a key component of a major road-building project initiated and overseen by the new Grand Duke of Tuscany, the Holy Roman Emperor Francis I, following his investiture in 1739. Until it opened, the ascent to the Raticosa had been prohibitively steep, and the two cities had been poorly connected by the Giogo pass (heading in the direction of Imola). The new road, which was capable of carrying wheeled vehicles, cut the journey time by horseback or mule from 2–3 days to a single day. Although the economic benefits for Tuscany turned out to be less favorable than expected, it remained for many years one of two principal thoroughfares connecting central Italy with the Po Valley. (Note: The other through road was the via Ximeniana from Pistoia to Modena via Abetone; SS 66).)

Towards the end of World War II, the stretch of the road around the Futa and Raticosa passes became a focus of heavy fighting. As part of their advance towards northern Italy in 1944, the Allies were determined to penetrate through the Futa and Raticosa passes, which had been identified as one of the two most vulnerable zones of the Gothic Line in the upper Apennines (the other being the Giogo pass).

The Raticosa featured prominently in many editions of the Mille Miglia open-road motorsport endurance race (1927–1957). Since 1977, the pass has marked the finish line for the Bologna-Raticosa time trial, a competition for classic cars, which by 2024 had reached its thirty-fifth edition.

Road cycling races have been held along the Bologna-Raticosa route since 1931. The pass also provides a popular climb for cyclists more generally. The Raticosa also features in hiking trails around Pietramala. Motorcyclists often meet up at the pass, where they frequent the 'chalet' bar.

== Gallery ==
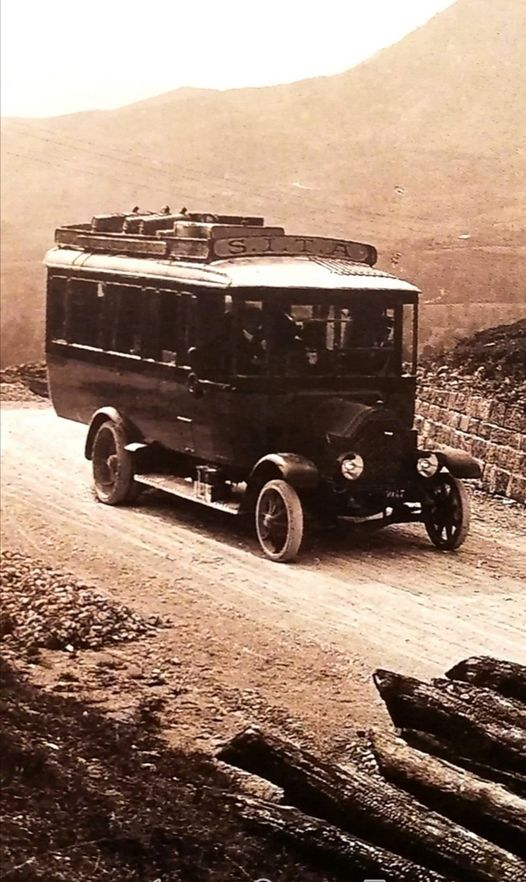
A public bus crossing the Raticosa pass in the 1920s.

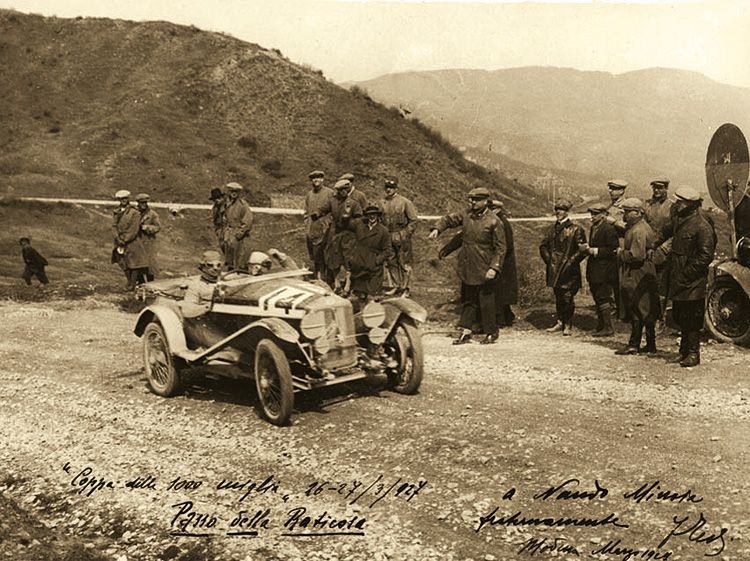
The eventual winners of the 1927 Mille Miglia crossing the Raticosa.

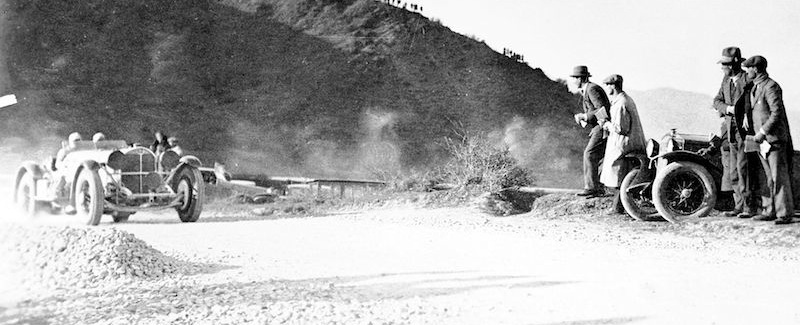
The 1931 Mille Miglia at the Raticosa.

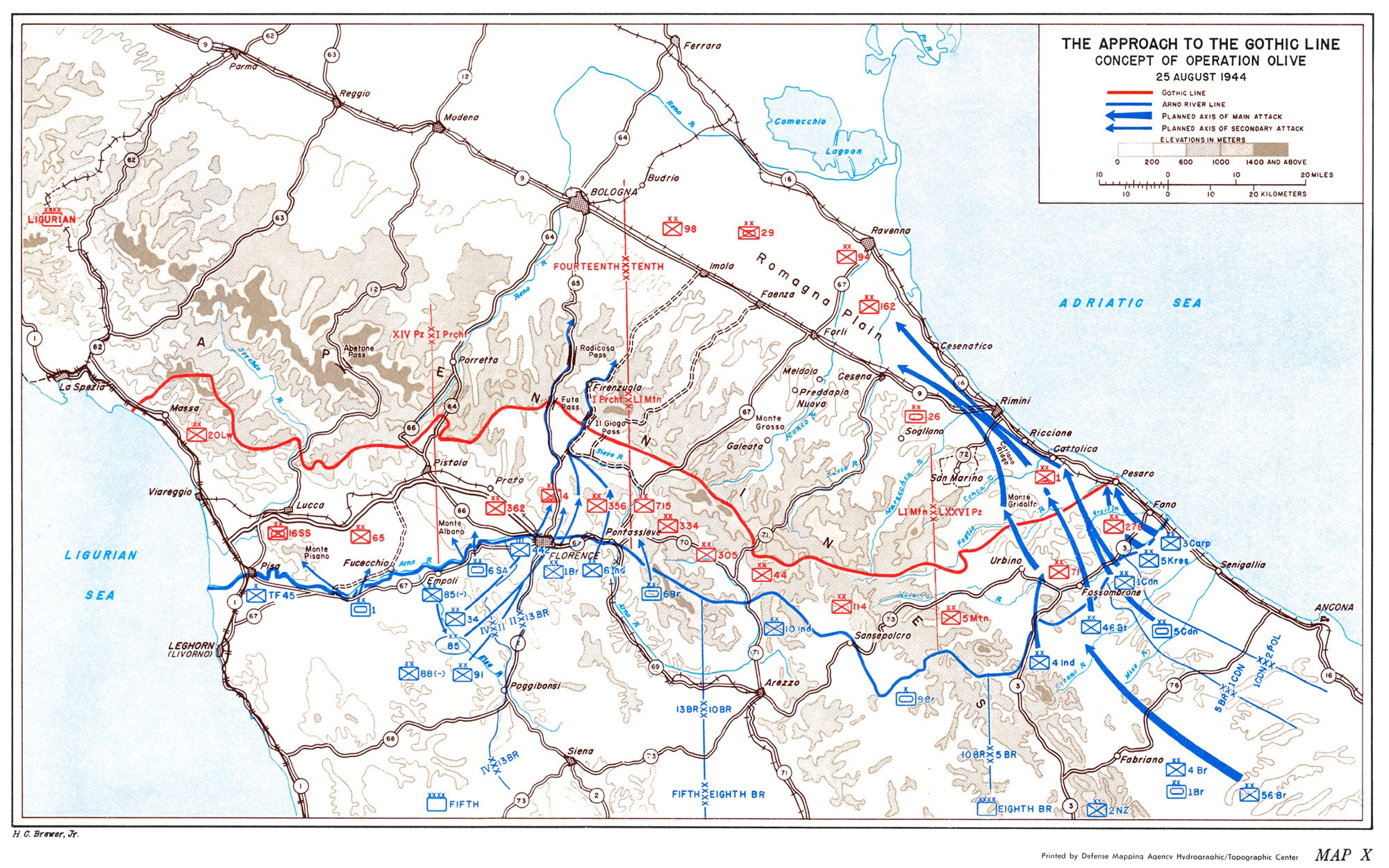
Map showing the planned Allied assault on the Gothic Line in 1944: one of the two main spearheads through the upper Apennines was along the SS 65 towards the Futa and 'Radicosa' passes in the direction of Bologna.

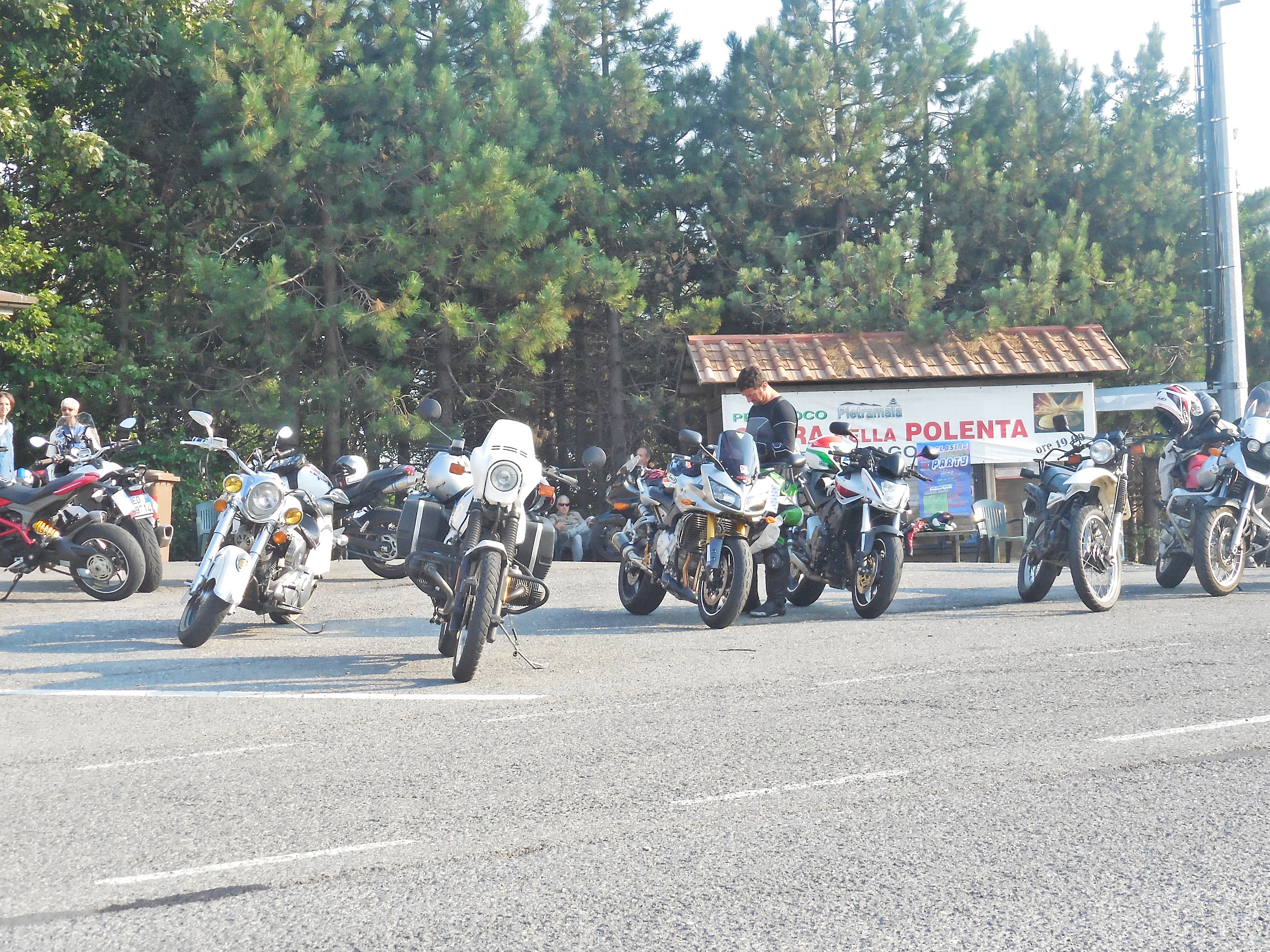
Motorcycles parked alongside the 'chalet' bar.

== See also ==
- Monghidoro
- Mugello
- Futa Pass Cemetery
