= Glasower Damm Nord–Bohnsdorf Süd railway =

Railway line in Germany

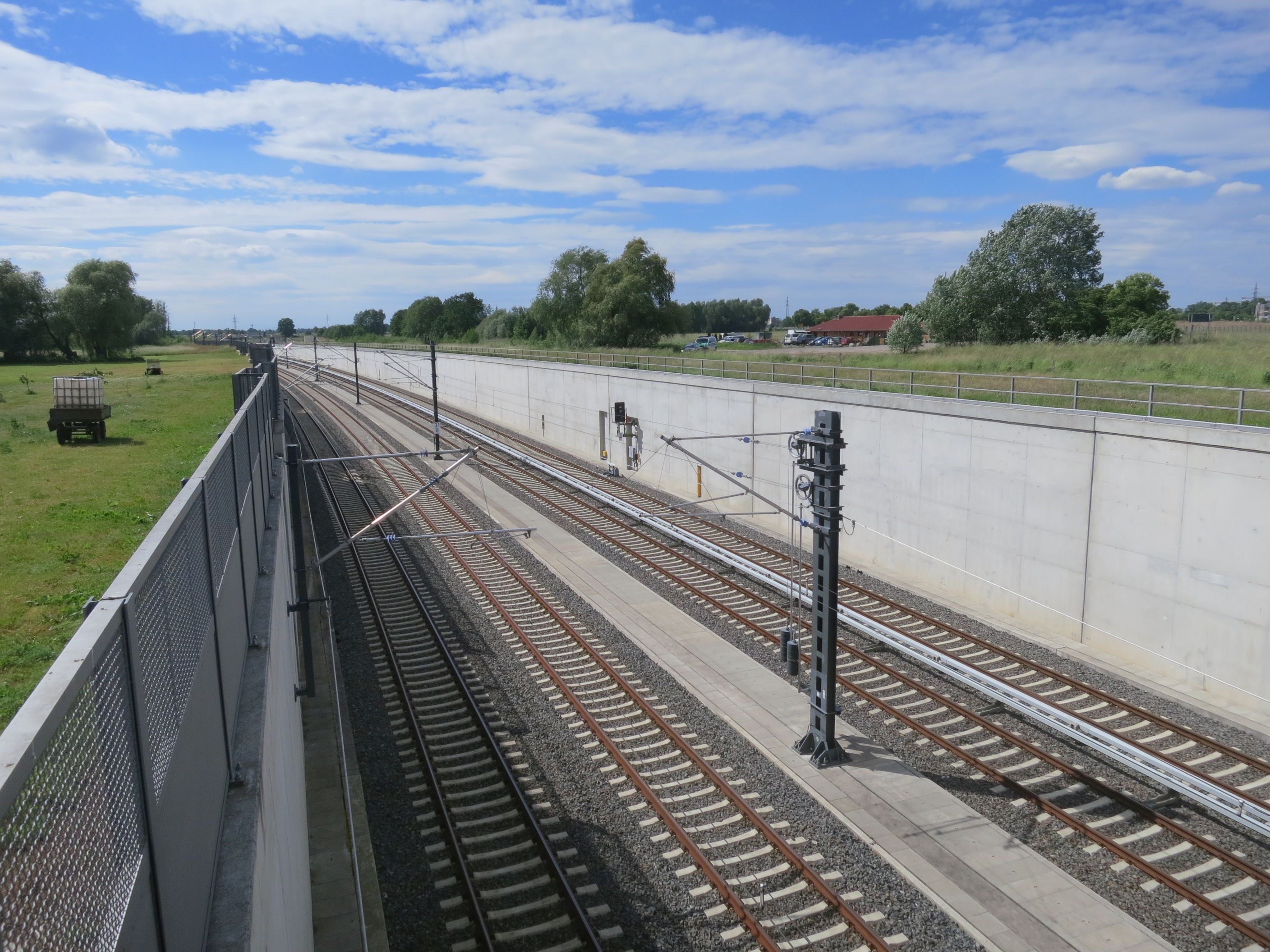
- Route west of Selchow. On the left is the long-distance line from Glasower Damm and on the right is the S-Bahn line from Schönefeld.

Overview
- Native name: Bahnstrecke Glasower Damm Nord–Bohnsdorf Süd
- Line number: 6151 Glasower Damm Ost–Bohnsdorf Süd; 6119 B.-Grünau–Schönefeld Flughafen Süd; 6186 Selchow West–Selchow Süd
- Locale: Berlin and Brandenburg, Germany

Technical
- Line length: 13.8 kilometres (8.6 mi) / 6.9 kilometres (4.3 mi)
- Track gauge: 1,435 mm (4 ft 8 1/2 in) standard gauge
- Electrification: 15 kV/16.7 Hz AC overhead catenary
- Operating speed: 120 km/h (75 mph)

The Glasower Damm Nord – Bohnsdorf Süd railway is an electrified, predominantly double-track main line in Germany. It is mainly located in the state of Brandenburg south of Berlin, but a small part of it is in Berlin. It is mainly intended to connect Berlin Brandenburg Airport (BER) with the underground Berlin Brandenburg Airport station. Its eastern section replaced the Berlin-Grünau – Berlin Schönefeld Airport South railway (Bahnstrecke Berlin-Grünau – Berlin Flughafen Schönefeld Süd), which was opened in 1963. This ran parallel to the current line and was mainly used to supply the airport with fuel and building materials. From 1992 to 2010, it was also used for passenger services to the biennial ILA Berlin Air Show.

The new continuous line to the airport went into operation in October 2011. Because of the delays in opening the airport, it has only had any traffic significance since October 2020, apart from the freight traffic to Schönefeld airport.

== History ==
The construction of the Henschel aircraft factory near the town of Diepensee, south of Berlin, began in 1934. The so-called Henschelbahn (Henschel Railway) initially supplied the works. It had emerged from the Diepensee freight railway, which had originally operated as a horse tramway. The line ran from Berlin-Grünau station straight through the built-up area of Bohnsdorf. After the Second World War, the railway was dismantled for reparations. A Soviet military airport was built on the grounds of the Henschel works after 1945. The Henschel Railway was rebuilt in 1947 to supply it with materials and fuels.

The southern part of the airport was transferred for civilian use to Deutsche Lufthansa of East Germany (later Interflug) on 27 April 1955. Initially, the former Henschel Railway continued to be used for the supply of materials and fuels. This line proved not to have sufficient capacity with the growth of the airport and it was also severely hampered the increasing road traffic. As a result a new siding was built in 1959 from the Grünbergallee station on the Berlin Outer Freight Ring (Güteraußenring, GAR) and the old line was closed. By the beginning of the 1960s, it became apparent that this line could no longer be used in the longer term. On the one hand, the line crossed the freeway that was under construction to the airport, on the other hand, the route of the GAR was needed for the future S-Bahn to Schönefeld. First, a track was laid parallel to the GAR, but due to the A 113 autobahn, which was under construction there, it could not be used in the longer-term.

=== The freight line to Schönefeld Airport ===
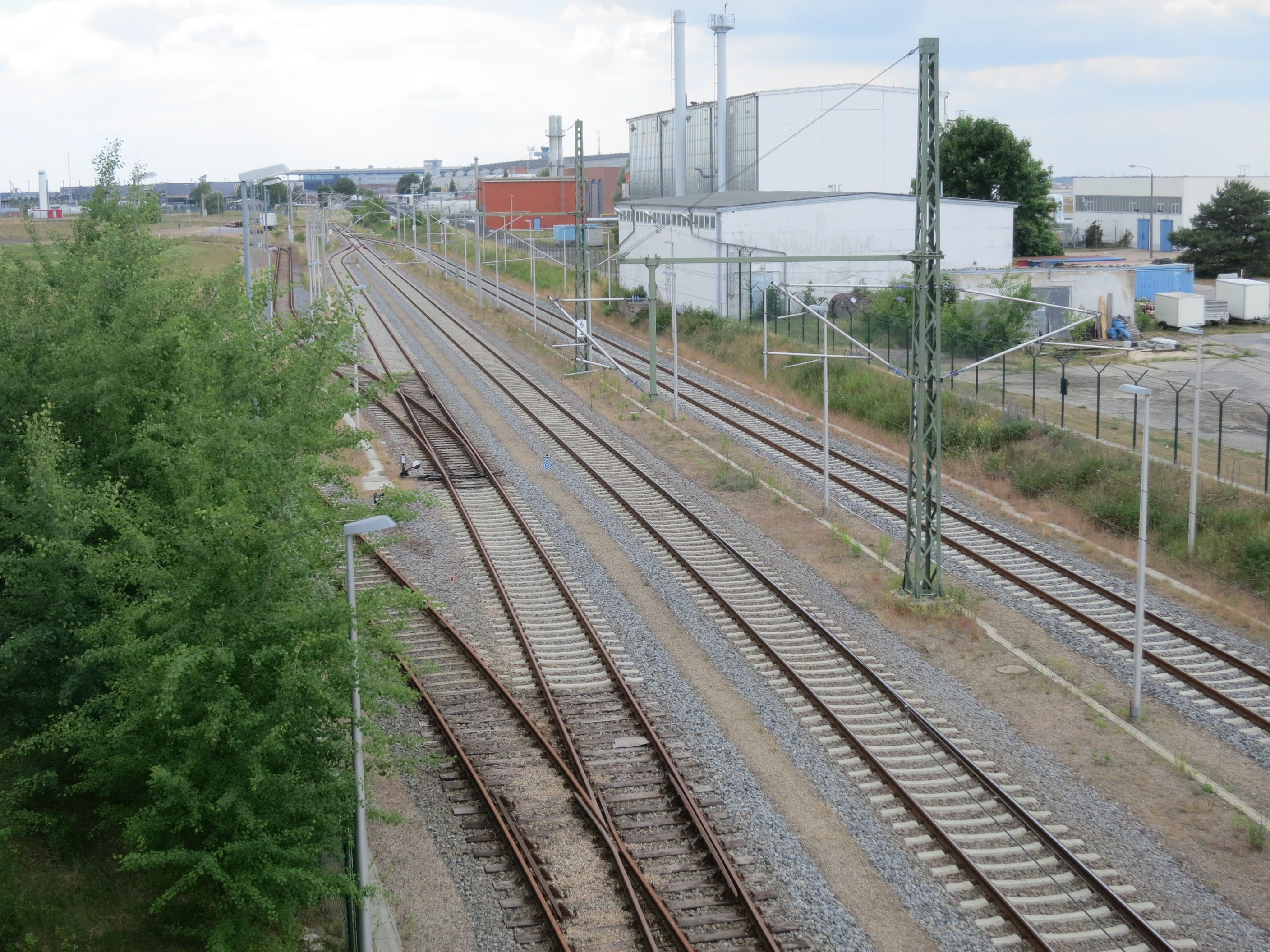
Freight link to the airport.

Because of these problems a completely new connection was built to the airport, which went into operation on 3 September 1963. It branched in Berlin-Grünau station from the Berlin–Görlitz railway, initially running parallel to it, then it turned to run south of Bohnsdorf through the forest and reached the airport from the east. Demands from Deutsche Lufthansa for services to carry its employees over the line were rejected due to the expected low traffic and lack of signalling infrastructure. In the 1970s and 1980s, the line, popularly called the Ölbahn (oil railway), was upgraded to enable the operation of axle loads of up to 22.5 tons. This enabled building materials to be carried on block trains to the Kienberg building materials warehouse, which was located next to the line.

After German reunification, the ILA Berlin Air Show (ILA) took place for the first time on the southern part of the airport. To handle the number of visitors, shuttle trains ran hourly from Berlin-Lichtenberg via Schöneweide or from Schönefeld Airport station to Berlin-Schönefeld Airport South station, meaning that two trains an hour and direction ran over the industrial railway. Services were operated as seven-carriage double-decker push–pull trains that were hauled by class 232 locomotives. A temporary chipboard platform was built for passengers. In addition, signalling and control systems from Siemens were installed for passenger traffic at the previously unprotected level crossings. Previously, only the federal route 179 level crossing was protected with a semi-barrier system.

Shuttle trains were again used at the following aerospace exhibitions, which took place every two years, with the rolling stock used changing over time. In 1994, for example, trains were operated with class 229 locomotives at both ends, alternately from Lichtenberg via Schöneweide and from Zoologischer Garten station via the Berlin Stadtbahn to the ILA station. In 2010, the last time the shuttle trains ran to ILA, they ran directly from Berlin-Lichtenberg without additional stops. Since 2012, the ILA is no longer held in Diepensee, but at Selchow on the west side of the airport grounds, so the shuttle trains have been cancelled.

=== Planning the connection of the new airport ===
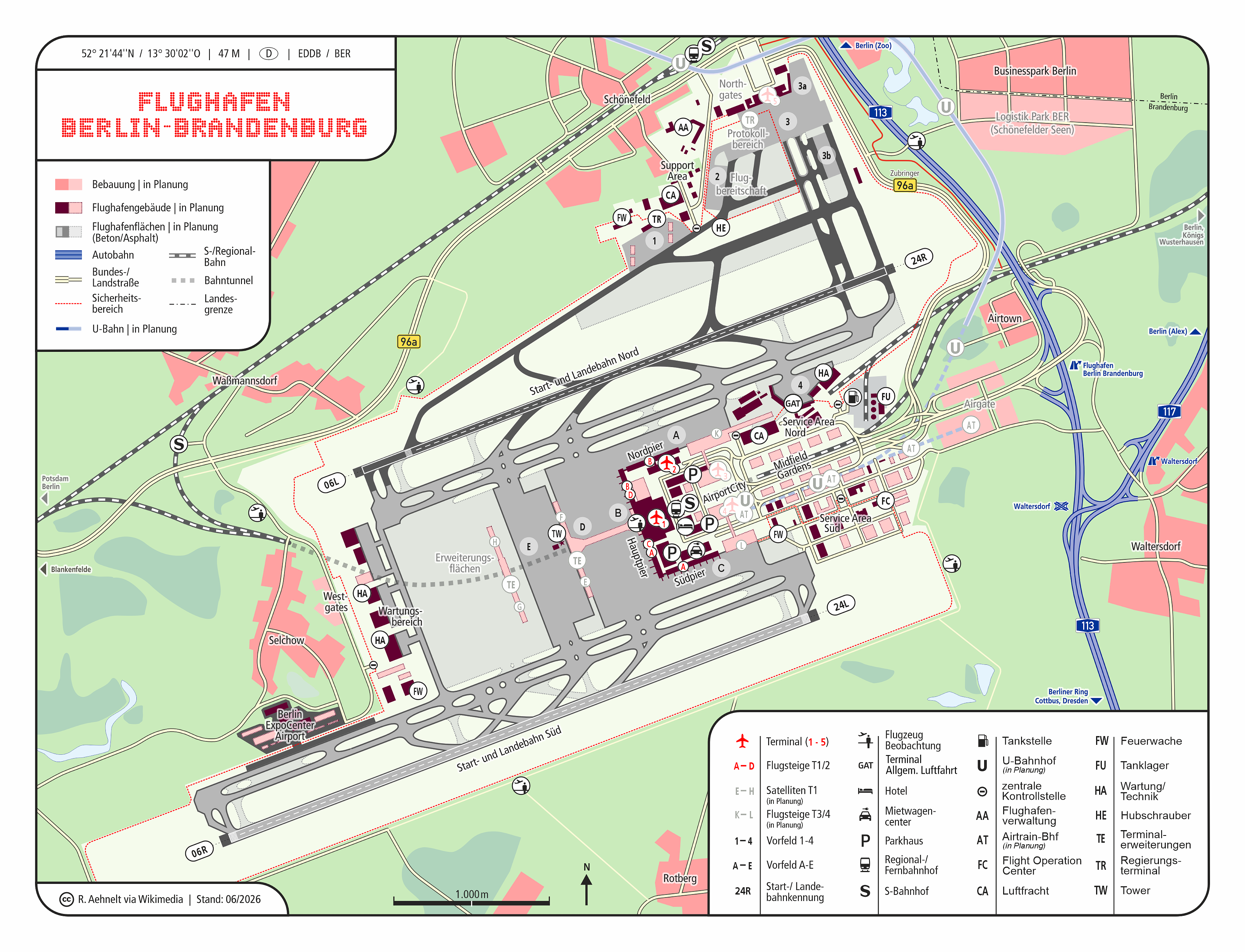
Rail connections to the new airport: long-distance line running from west to east, S-Bahn line running on a bend from the north and freight link on the east side of the airport to the north of the main line.

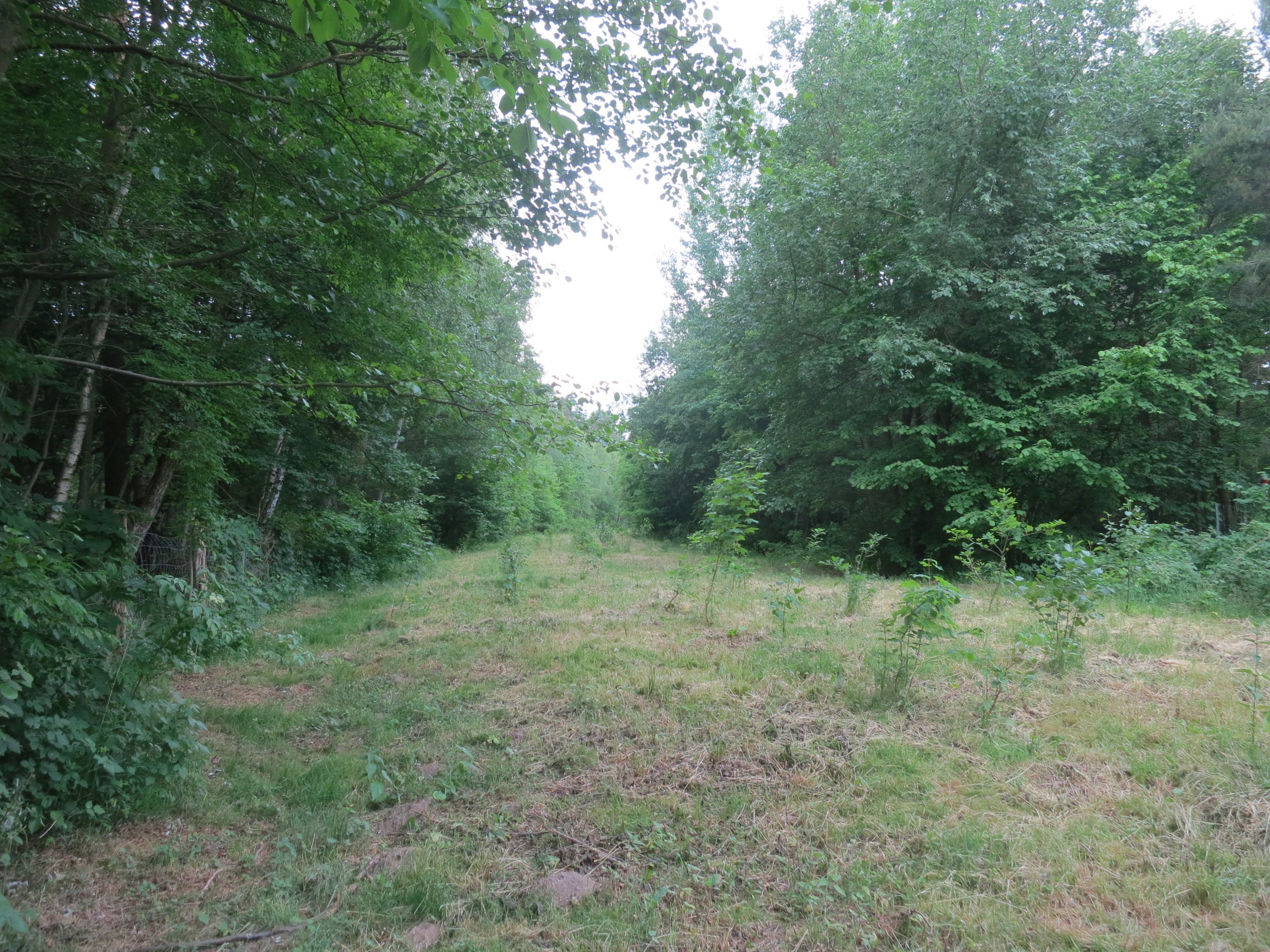
Regrowth on the old line south of Bohnsdorf.

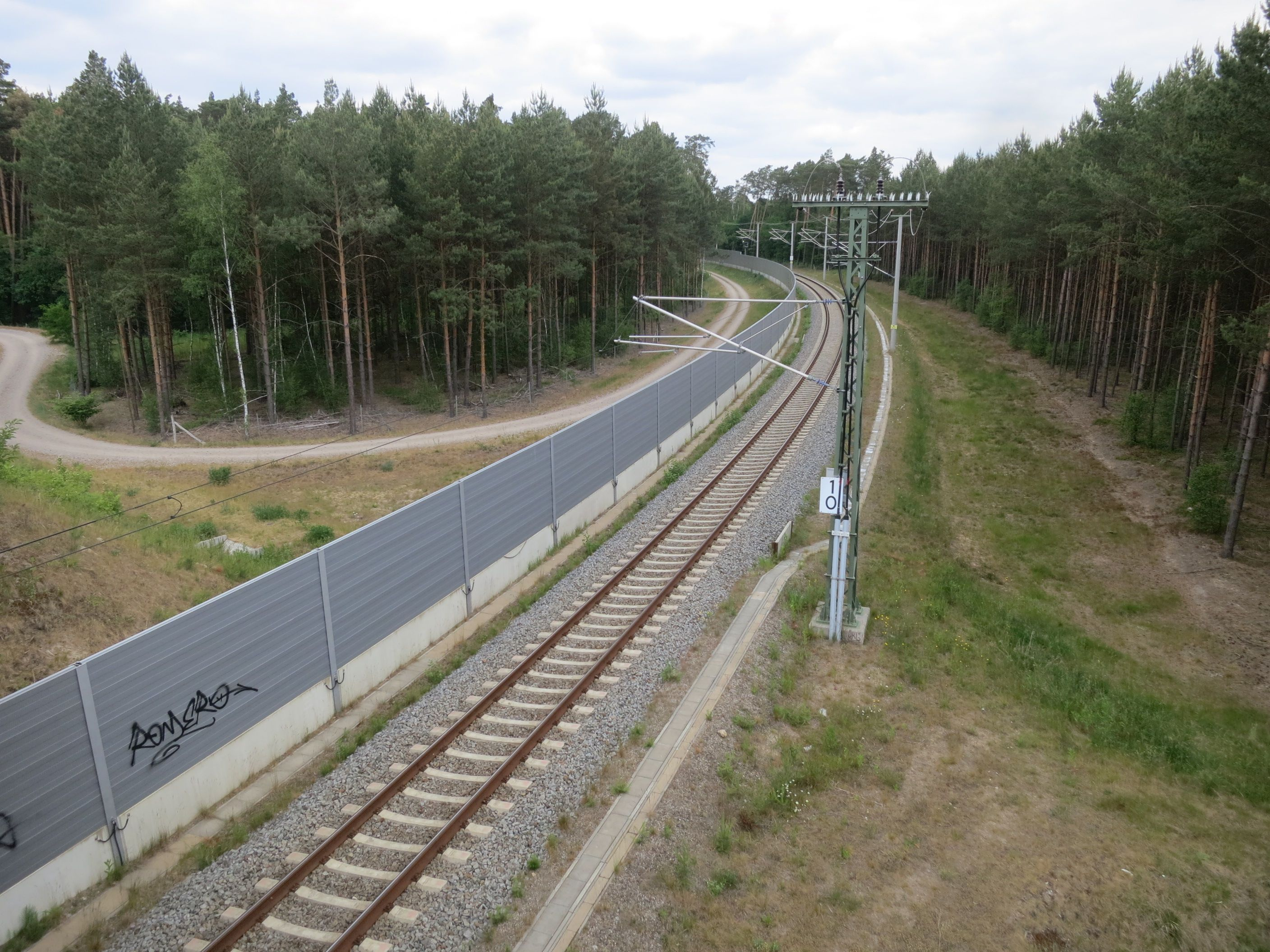
Noise barriers in the forest on the connection curve towards Grünau

After lengthy discussions in the 1990s, the federal government and the state governments of Brandenburg and Berlin decided on the location of Berlin's new airport (then Flughafen Berlin Brandenburg International, abbreviated BBI) in the municipality of Schönefeld, south of the existing airport, partly using the old airport’s facilities. It was soon determined that the new terminal would be location the area south of the runways of the existing airport. As part of the Pilzkonzept (mushroom concept) it proved to be sensible to build lines connecting to Berlin's inner city via the North–South mainline, on the one hand, and via the Dresden Railway, on the other hand. Plans from the mid-1990s already showed a long-distance line, which was close to the route later built, while the S-Bahn was intended at that time to use a short underground route from the old Berlin Schönefeld Airport station.

In addition to the connections with an S-Bahn line and a long-distance line that were actually built, a number of other options for the development of rail transport at the airport were discussed, which were not realised:

- An extension of U-Bahn line 7 from Rudow via the old Berlin Schönefeld airport station to the new terminal was discussed.
- An extension of the planned Transrapid Hamburg–Berlin line to the airport was also under discussion. Officially, the Berlin Senate did not abandon these plans until 2000.
- There were demands, including from some of the Berlin Greens, to dispense with a direct connection to the terminal and instead to use the old Schönefeld station. A shuttle or a people mover would then convey passengers to the new terminal.

=== Construction and commissioning ===
The railway connection was initially planned as part of the "rail transport connection" in the application for planning approval for the airport as a whole. The Brandenburg transport ministry granted planning approval in August 2004 and the Federal Administrative Court confirmed it on 16 March 2006. Work began on the shell of the underground airport station in September 2007, on the S-Bahn line at the end of 2007 and on the western long-distance rail connection in the spring of 2008.

The planning approval process for the eastern connection to the Görlitz Railway was delayed due to changes to the plan. Originally an upgrade of the existing line was planned, which could not be built because of the tight curve radii and the noise pollution for the residents, among other things. The planning approval process only started in 2007. Among several options tested, one involved building a line through the forest, running about 250 metres south of the old line. There were a number of protests by local residents and conservationists against its construction, partly because 14 hectares of forest had to be cleared. Due to the delays, there were fears that the eastern connection would not be completed by the planned opening of the airport in 2011, so alternative connection concepts were considered.

Proposals of an environmental group to build a line along federal road 113, instead of the line through the Bohnsdorf forest, was declined by the Federal Railway Authority (Eisenbahn-Bundesamt, EBA). The EBA pointed out that there would be higher burdens for Bohnsdorf residents due to noise and vibration. On 19 February 2010, the EBA gave planning approval and a few days later, Deutsche Bahn began construction. It was agreed that the course of the old line would be restored to nature and noise barriers would be built on the new line.

For the originally planned opening date of the new airport (now abbreviated as BER) on 30 October 2011, the eastern connection would be completed together with the western connection, the S-Bahn line and the Berlin Brandenburg airport station. However, the opening of the airport had meanwhile been postponed to 3 June 2012.

It was not until the beginning of May 2012 that it officially announced that the opening of the BER airport would be delayed for the first time. Initially, completion was officially expected in 2013. As a result, the opening of the line also had to be delayed. At the beginning of 2018, the airport was expected to open in 2020 or 2021.

Thus, there wasis no significant use of the completed line to the airport, apart from the freight traffic from the Görlitz Railway to the airport. DB operated several empty trains each day over the S-Bahn and the mainline tracks to reduce rusting of the tracks and to help ventilate the airport station.

=== Costs ===
In the financial agreement signed on 5 September 2006 by the states of Berlin and Brandenburg, the federal government and the Berlin Airports agreed to provide €636 million for rail connections (including the S-Bahn line). The federal government was to fund €576 million of this. The states of Berlin and Brandenburg were to fund €30 million each and undertook to fund transport services under contract for 20 years on the basis of full cost recovery. Under a fixed-price agreement, the airport company was required to fund the construction of the external structures of the tunnel and the airport station. Even after the completion of the rail link, the official construction cost was €636 million.

Deutsche Bahn estimates that the trips required to ventilate the tunnel since the completion of the line cost €2 million a month.

=== Planned passenger services ===
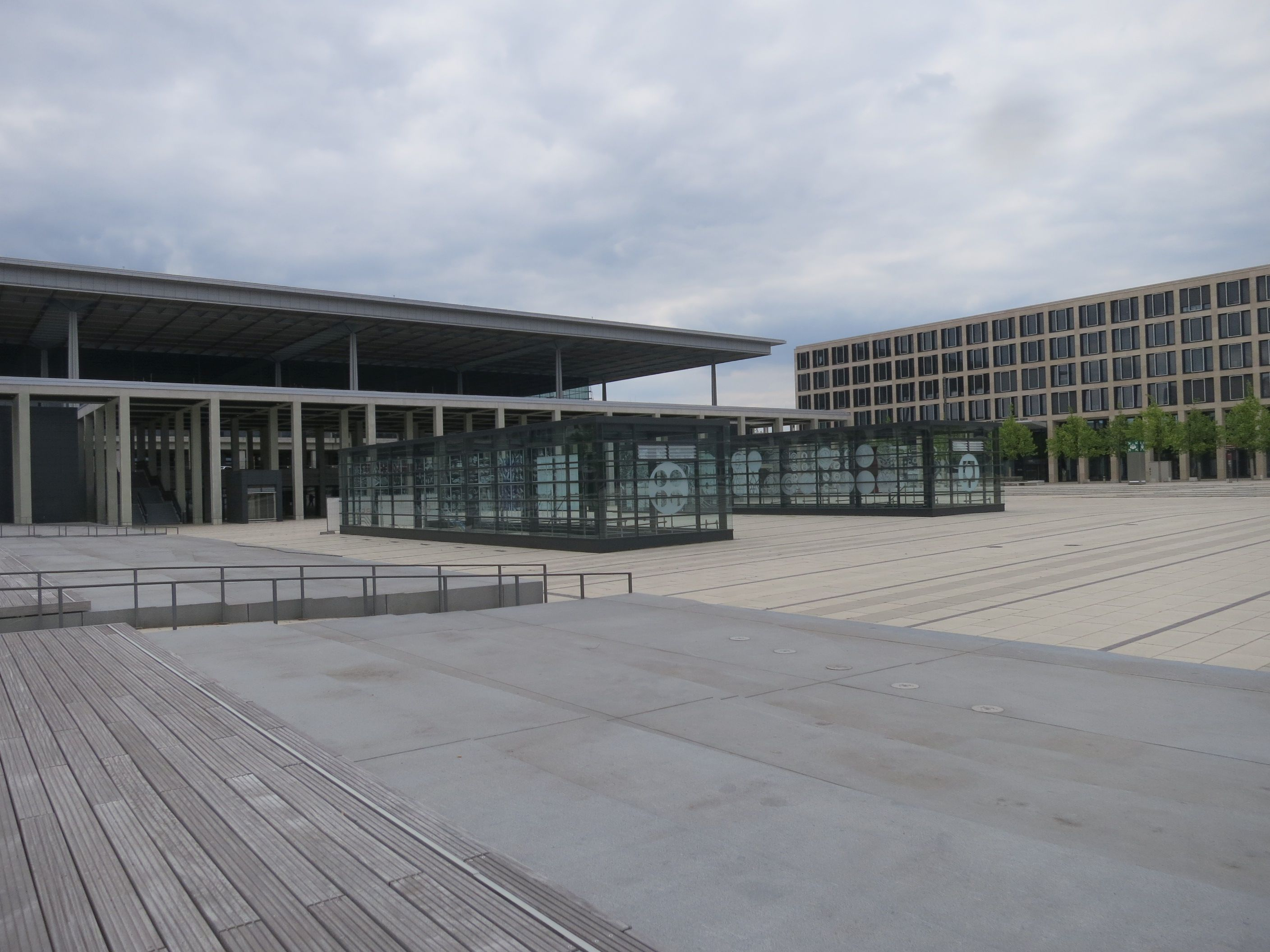
Airport forecourt with access buildings to the platforms, with the terminal in the background.

The first plans in the mid-1990s included as an airport connection for regional services, an InterRegio service from Kiel via Berlin and the airport line to Görlitz.

In the mid-2000s, the Berlin Senate planned that all ICE and IC trains starting or ending in Berlin would be routed to and from the airport station and an InterCity line would run from Berlin to the airport towards Cottbus and continue to Poland. However, these plans were not pursued further.

At the beginning of 2012, prior to the planned opening of the BER, it was planned that the three RE/RB lines that run to the old Schoenefeld Airport station would instead run to the new airport station. These were the RE 7 (Dessau – Berlin – Wünsdorf-Waldstadt), RB 14 (Nauen – Berlin – Senftenberg) and RB 22 (Potsdam – Airport (− Königs Wusterhausen)) services. In addition, a new RE 9 line was to connect the airport via the Outer Ring and the Berlin–Halle railway (Anhalter Bahn) to Berlin Hauptbahnhof. A direct fast connection to the city centre of Berlin was not possible because the construction of long-distance tracks on the Dresden Railway in Berlin has been delayed. In addition, a few long-distance services would be extended to the airport. With the completion of the Dresden Railway, instead of the current RE 9 service, an unsubsidised airport express service would connect the airport station with the city centre every 15 minutes and some other services would also run over this route.

=== Future plans ===
A new halt is planned to the east of the intersection of the line with the A113 on the route of a newly planned road. It would consist of two side platforms and two associated station forecourts and serve regional traffic. The construction of the new road is scheduled for 2019.

== Route ==
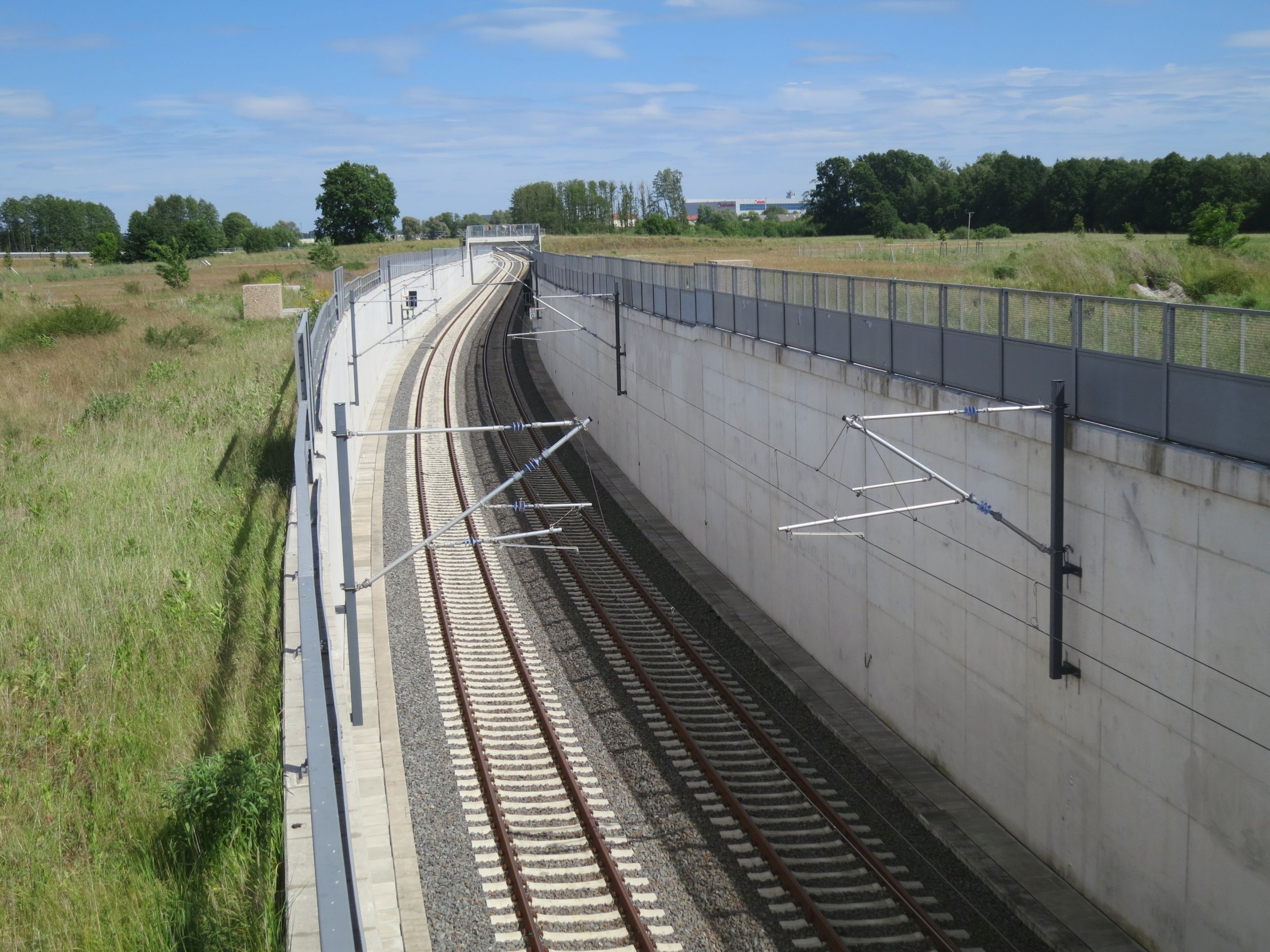
Line to the airport after the underpass under the Berlin outer ring.

The Dresden railway crosses the Berlin outer ring in the area of Glasower Damm in the town of Mahlow. It is connected from the south to the Berlin outer ring via two connecting curves. The outer ring was upgraded to four tracks from the Glasower Damm Ost junction towards Schönefeld Airport in the 1980s. The new line to Berlin Brandenburg Airport (BER) first uses the former northern pair of tracks of the outer ring. Less than two kilometres further east, the line then runs under the other tracks of the outer ring and turns towards the southeast. A short Selchow West junction–Selchow Süd junction link connects the southern tracks of the outer ring to the line to BER. This runs first above ground in a trough. North of the village of Selchow, it meets the Grünau Cross–Berlin Brandenburg Airport railway of the S-Bahn coming from the northeast. Both routes run parallel from the western edge of the airport area in a several kilometre-long tunnel between the two runways. The Berlin Brandenburg Airport station is located shortly before the eastern end of the tunnel. The S-Bahn line ends in the station and the main line continues northeast and leaves the tunnel. The fast tracks for regional trains ending in the station are already above ground. A short distance later, at Diepensee Cargo junction, the line meets the freight link from the airport, which was previously served by the original line. The new line converges with the route of the old line a short distance later in the area of the Kienberg loading point. The line passes under the A 113 autobahn to the east of the settlement of Hubertus. Both lines then run through a forest area in the locality of Berlin-Bohnsdorf; the new line runs about 250 metres south of the old line. Southeast of Bohnsdorf, the new line divides at Bohnsdorf West junction into two 1.4 km and 1.8 km-long single track sections, which run to the Görlitz Railway to the south and north, forming a railway triangle.

=== Chainage ===
The through line (VzG line number 6151) begins at Glasower Damm Ost junction. However, running distance on the line (chainage) does not start at zero, but follows that of the Berlin outer ring. This in turn continues the chainage of the Michendorf–Großbeeren railway, opened in 1926, which formed part of the Brandenburg Bypass Railway. The starting point of the chainage is therefore at kilometre 28.220 km, the distance from Michendorf. The outer ring to the east and the line to the new airport have parallel chainages measured from that point. The end of line 6151 is at Bohnsdorf Süd junction on the Görlitz Railway at kilometre 42.073.

The old Berlin-Grünau – Berlin Schönefeld Airport South railway had the VzG line number of 6119, which is still used today for the remaining part of the Diepensee Cargo junction – Berlin-Schönefeld Airport South line. Similarly, the northern connecting curve built parallel to the old line from the Görlitz Railway from Berlin to Bohnsdorf West junction bears this number. The running distances on these sections are measured from Berlin-Grünau station. The zero point of the old line is in the southern part of the station at kilometre 13.43 of the Görlitz Railway. The section to Berlin-Schönefeld Airport South maintains this chainage. The new connecting curve from Berlin-Grünau to Bohnsdorf West is measured with the new chainage. It starts at kilometre 14.4 of the Görlitz Railway and is 1.8 kilometres long.

The 0.79 km-long Selchow West–Selchow Süd connecting curve (line 6186) lies south of the tracks of the outer ring.

=== Operating points ===
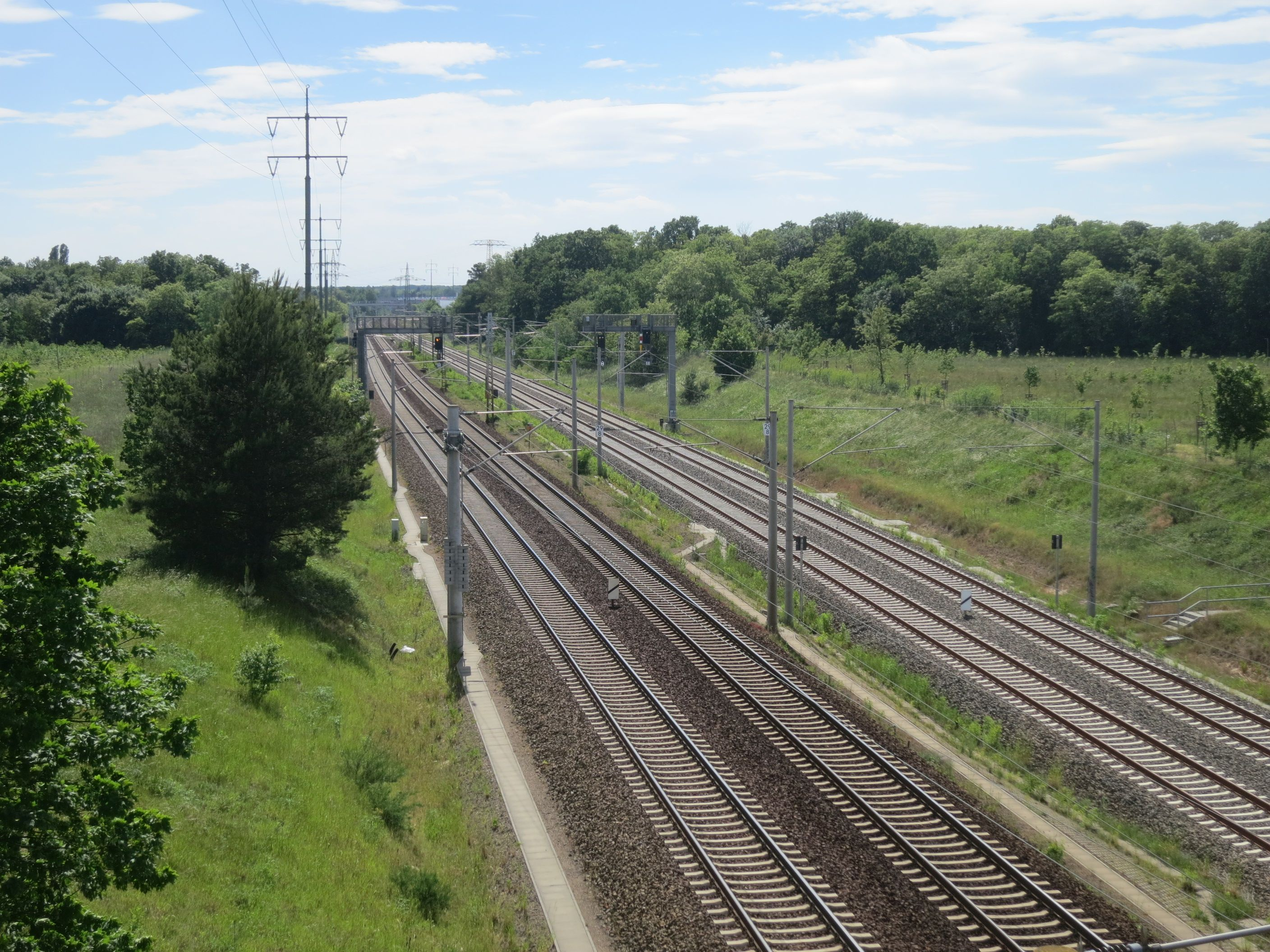
On the left is the line to the airport and on the right is the outer ring towards Schönefeld.

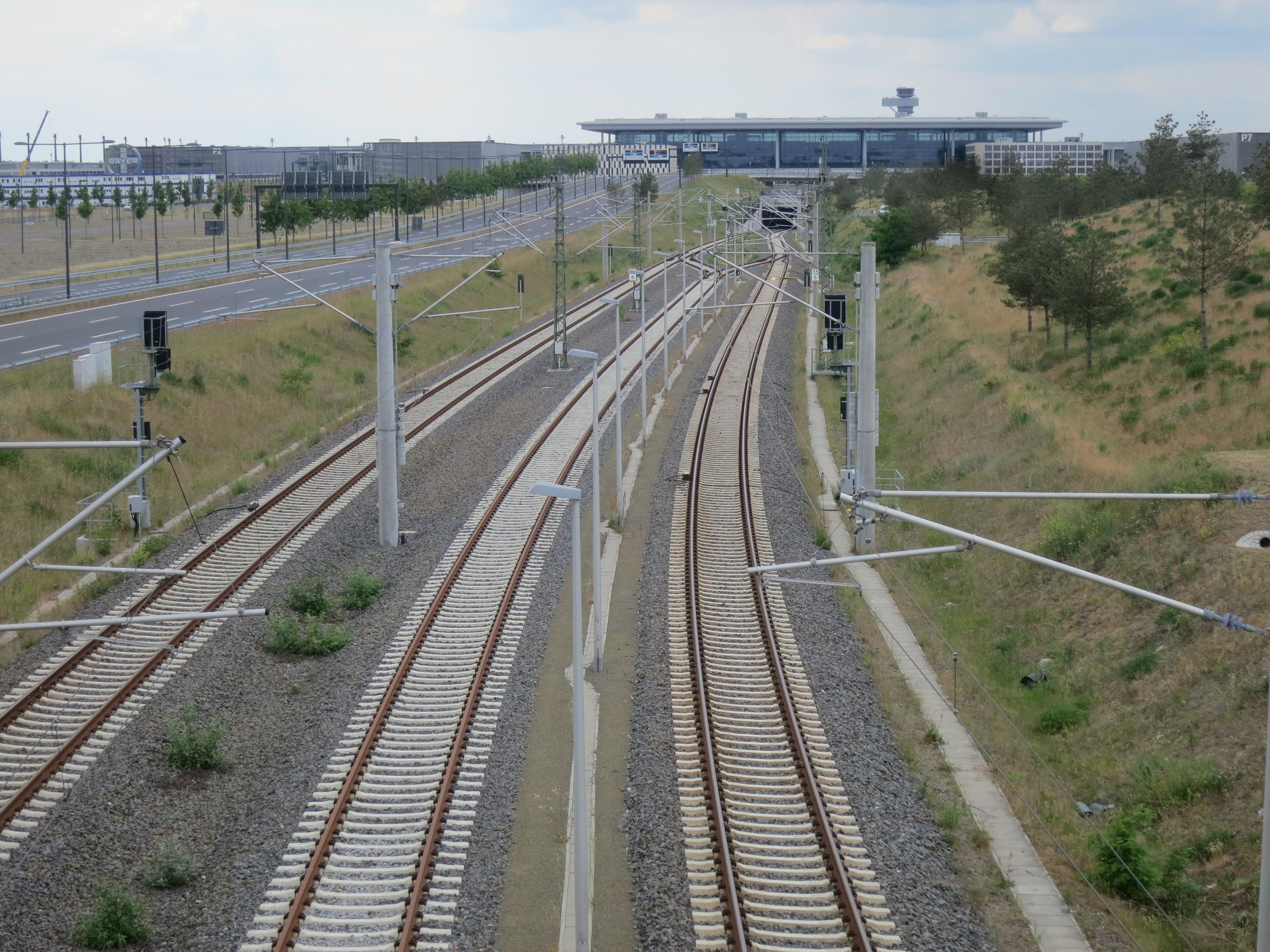
Looking from the east at part of the airport station with the tunnel entrance.

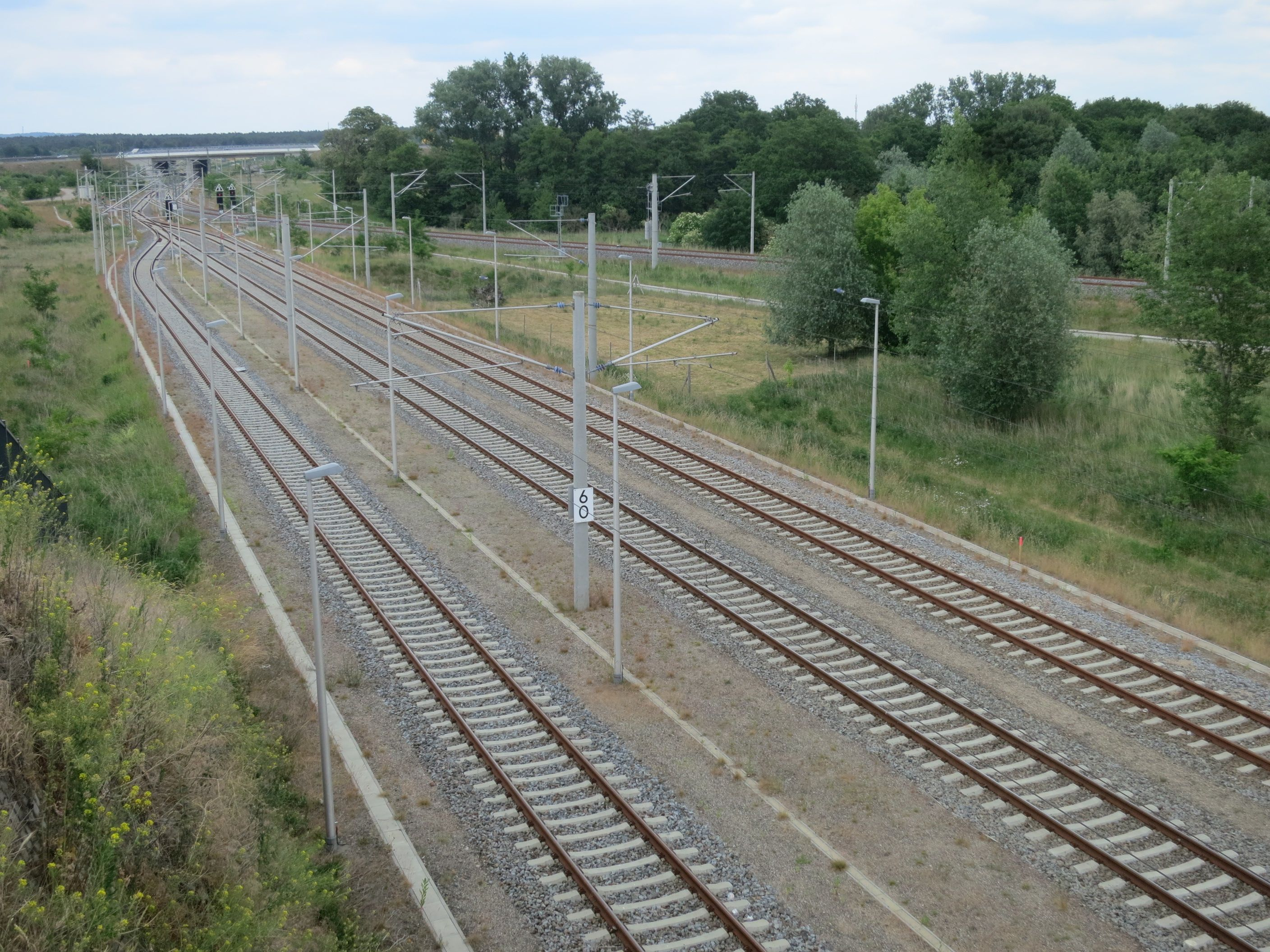
Diepensee Cargo junction. In the foreground is the freight line to the airport and in the background is the line to the passenger station.

==== Glasower Damm Ost ====
In the area of the Glasower Damm, a connecting road was built between Mahlow and Glasow, crossing the Berlin–Dresden railway and the Berlin outer ring at the beginning of the 1950s. Three junctions were built to connect the lines: Glasower Damm West on the Berlin outer ring as a junction from the connecting curve from the west to the Dresden Railway in the south, Glasower Damm Süd (south) on the Dresden Railway at the meeting of two connecting from the Berlin outer ring and Glasower Damm Ost (east) on the outer ring at the connecting curve from the east to the Dresden Railway. In the area of this junction, a curve was built from the junction to the new line to the new airport in the opposite direction to the existing connection.

==== Selchow West and Süd ====
Selchow West and South are junctions on the short connecting curve from the southern track of the Berlin outer ring towards BER airport.

==== Berlin Airport station ====
The underground station is only for passenger traffic. It consists of two island platforms for the long-distance railway and one for the S-Bahn.

==== Diepensee Cargo ====
This is the junction to the new airport freight terminal.

==== Berlin Schönefeld Flughafen Süd ====
The terminus of the old line from Grünau is used to supply the airport with fuel and building materials. It is now connected to the new line. Over time, it has changed its name several times, mostly following the renaming of the airport and the passenger station that was located north of the airport. It was called Diepensee before the construction of the line from Grünau. Its name in the 1960s and 1970s was Zentralflughafen Süd (Central Airport South) and then Flughafen Süd (Airport South). Since the 1990s, it has been called Berlin-Schönefeld Flughafen Süd (Berlin Schönefeld Airport South). It has always been categorised as a Ladestelle (loading point).

==== Kienberg ====
A loading point for building material transports had already been established in Kienberg on the old line.

==== Bohnsdorf West and Süd ====
The line divides into two branches at Bohnsdorf West junction. One runs southeast to the Görlitz Railway, which it joins at Bohnsdorf Süd junction, the other runs north towards Berlin-Grünau station.

== Notes ==
=== Sources ===
Kuhlmann, Bernd (1996). Schönefeld bei Berlin. Ein Amt, ein Flughafen und elf Bahnhöfe (in German). Berlin: Verlag GVE. p. 28. ISBN 3-89218-038-5.
