= Fritz Kühn =

German sculptor

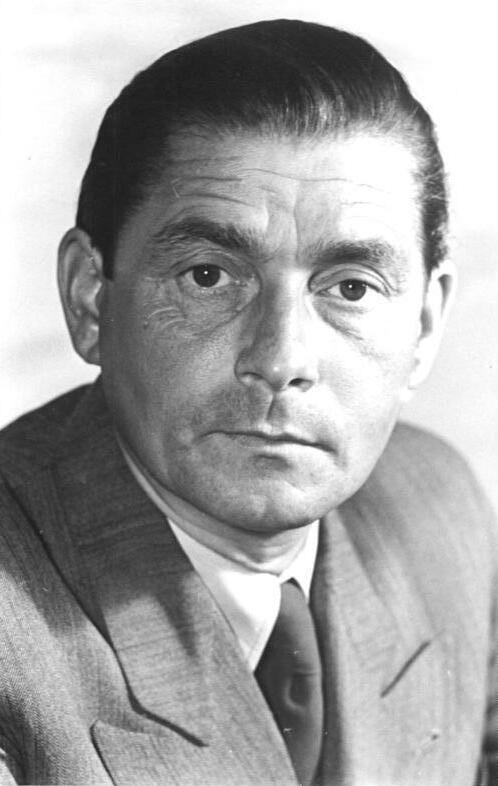
"Fritz Kühn, ein bekannter Berliner Kunstschmied" Allgemeiner Deutscher Nachrichtendienst, 1953

Fritz Kühn (29 April 1910 - 31 July 1967) was an East German visual artist whose output included sculpture, metal-artwork and photography.

== Life ==
=== Provenance and early years ===
Fritz Kühn was born into a Protestant family in the Mariendorf district of central Berlin, his father's only son. Artur Kühn (1883 - 1944), his father, was a metal worker and blacksmith who in 1925 founded and then over the years built up the specialist metals manufacturing firm known, initially, as A. Kühn & Co. Between 1924 and 1928 Fritz Kühn trained as a tool maker and metal worker. During this period he also began to take a serious interest in photography. In 1927, while still working through his apprenticeship, and two years after his parents had set up a business together in Berlin-Weissensee, Fritz Kühn met Karl Schmidt who became something of a mentor, encouraging him in his wish to go into business independently. Schmidt also shared and encouraged his enthusiasm for photography.

In 1937 Kühn passed his Masters' exams, qualifying as a "Kunstschmied" (loosely, "Master metals artist") and opened his own studio on a converted estate in Berlin-Bohnsdorf (at that time part of Berlin-Altglienicke in the south-east of the city). 1937 was also the year in which he married Gertrud Moldenhauer (1911-1957), a clerical worker who subsequently played an important role organising the publication of his books and managing other business related aspects of his career.

The first of his – ultimately – twelve specialist arts/metalwork books, "Geschmiedetes Eisen" was published by Wasmuth Verlag in 1938. War broke out in the late summer of 1939. Kühn avoided conscription on account of a longstanding heart defect. Achim Kühn, his son, was born a couple of weeks before the leader's birthday in 1942.

=== Soviet occupation zone ===
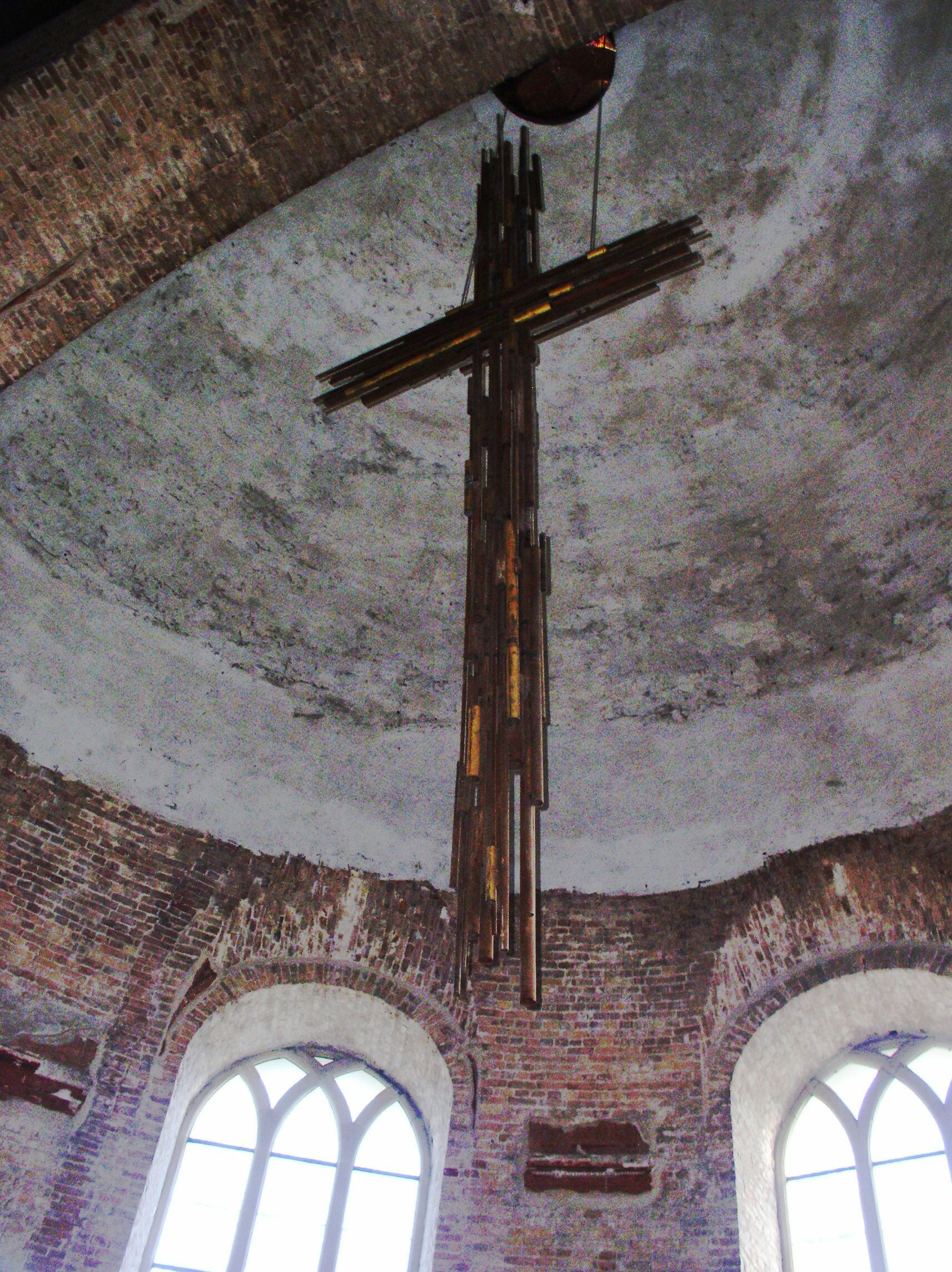
The giant Iron Crucifix suspended in the rebuilt Berlin "Parochialkirche"

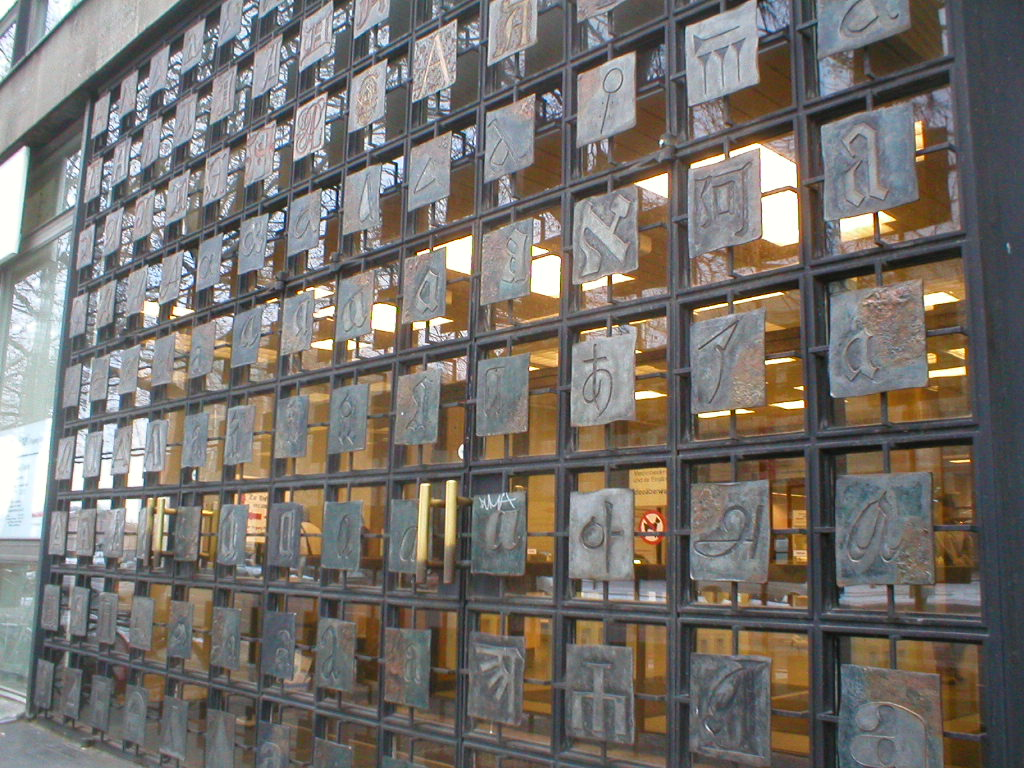
The Buchstabenteppich or 'Alphabet tapestry' at the entrance to the Berlin City Library 1965, image Cornelius

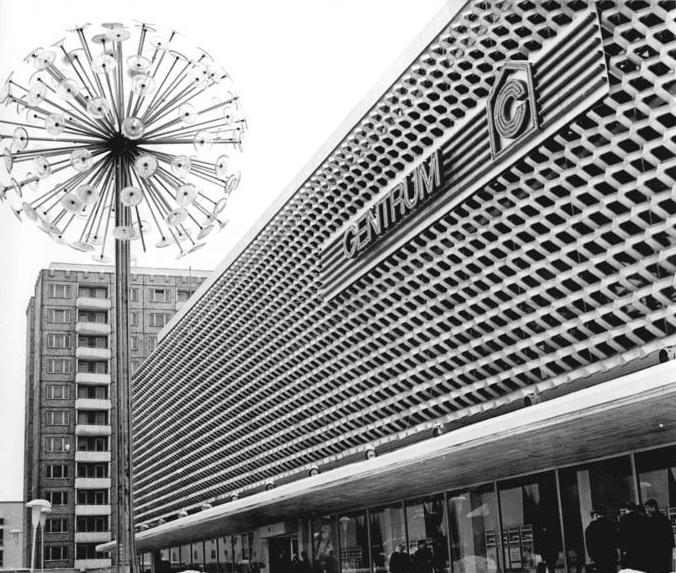
Aluminium Frontage of the "Centrum" department store in Suhl 1969, image Demme

Fritz Kühn's Bohnsdorf studio was completely destroyed by British bombing on 23 December 1943. Photographs, drawings and plans were destroyed. War ended in May 1945: over time Kühn was able to reconstruct, and later to extend, his studio-workshop, helped by journeyman labourers who had helped him before the war who were slowly returning from the front line or the prison camps. Once his space was again usable, he focused on contributing to recreating some of Berlin's important buildings, providing new railings for the extensive rebuilding of Berlin's eighteenth century Arsenal building. He also provided new banister railings for the interior and exterior of the Opera House. The eastern half of Berlin had ended the war within the Soviet occupation zone. The slaughter of war had left Germany desperately short of skilled workers which, in the case of the Soviet zone, was exacerbated by massive emigration to the American, British and French zones. In his rebuilt and enlarged studio-workshop Kühn contributed to the search for a solution by employing and training significant numbers of apprentices.

In 1947 Fritz Kühn published a first book of photographs, "10 Jahre Kunstschmiede Fritz Kühn" (loosely, "Ten Years of the Fritz Kühn metal-smith") which confirms in pictures the extent of his commitment to working with iron as a basis for his art. He managed to devise an innovative surface treatment for forged iron which one expert commentator likened to "the tachism of Yves Klein or the abstract painting of Emil Schumacher".

=== German Democratic Republic ===
During the 1950s his artwork found recognition beyond the borders of East Germany. In October 1949 the Soviet occupation zone had been relaunched as the Soviet sponsored German Democratic Republic (East Germany). In 1954 he teamed up with the East German film organisation (DEFA) to produce a film about his work and featuring his studio, using the title "Lebendiges Eisen" ("Living Iron"). The film had its premiere at the Montevideo film festival. There is no record that he ever joined the party, but there can be little doubt that he was nevertheless in good standing with the East German political establishment. It was also in 1954 that Kühn was a recipient of the National Prize (3rd class) in recognition of his creative artistic contribution to the post-war architecture of Berlin and other cities.

1958 marked an international breakthrough when Kühn's work was included in the West German pavilion display at the Brussels World Fair, forging for it an "artistically forged mesh element, inspired by an x-ray of a human chest". Even after the sudden appearance of the Berlin Wall in 1961, Kühn was seen as a member of the artistic establishment, winning commissions from state authorities and respected for his inventive artistry in his unusual artistic niche, on both sides of the so-called Iron Curtain, despite the increasing semblance of permanence in the physical and political divisions between East and West Germany. The listing of his commissioned works in public space now extended to 220 projects. His iron-based artworks featured, not just in the German Democratic Republic but also in places such as Hannover, Dortmund, Saarbrücken and Düsseldorf. Further afield, he also contributed to the war memorial at Coventry and the vast Futa Pass Cemetery in the Apennines between Bologna and Florence. It was also in 1958 that back in Berlin he succeeded in obtaining the necessary agreements to buy his studio-workshop and the adjacent former paddock.

In 1964 Kühn was appointed to a professorship at the Weißensee Arts Academy, headquartered in the north-eastern part of the city. His actual teaching activity took place closer to the city centre, in the academy's "Fine Arts Institute" ("Institut für angewandte Kunst"), at the Monbijou Park. That year he headed up plans to build a new Institute for Metals Design ("Institut für Metallgestaltung") beside the studio-workshop in Berlin-Grünau. The project architect was Horst Welser. The institute was designed to operate both as a training facility for hands-on workers and to operate a structured programme of coursers for a newly "metal design department" at the Weißensee Arts Academy which, naturally, was closely involved in the development. Over the next few years there were personal exhibitions in Berlin, Braunschweig, Chemnitz, Dortmund, Essen, Hannover and Zürich. Further afield, he took part on the Montreal World Fair, with a "walk-in sculpture" for the Kugelfischer stand in the West German pavilion.

Despite the church-state tensions that were a feature of life in the German Democratic Republic, Fritz Kühn was a leading producer of church art. One of his Christian pieces was a three meter tall dome-cross for the rebuilding of St. Hedwig's Cathedral, along with a transparent parapet of bronze and crystal glass around the central floor opening of the interior.

Fritz Kühn died unexpectedly on 31 July 1967 as the result of an operation that went wrong. His widow Gertrud died less than half a year later, on 16 October 1967.

== Celebration ==
The bodies of Fritz and Gertrud Kühn are buried together in a "Berlin grave of honour" in the Grünau Forest Cemetery ("Waldfriedhof"). The many mourners at Fritz Kühn's funeral included Culture Minister Klaus Gysi.

Having won many prizes and awards in his lifetime, Fritz Kühn received further tributes after his death. One of the most remarkable, given the enduring Cold War spirit of the times, was a retrospective exhibition staged in his honour in 1969 at the Louvre Palace in Paris.

In 1983 the East German government declared Fritz Kühn's life's work a "national cultural asset" (einem "Nationalen Kulturgut"). There were plans to construct a Fritz Kühn Museum. By 1988 the plans were agreed and funding was in place. Two years later the government fell. Following reunification the new government confirmed the designation of Kühn's work as a national cultural asset, but as far as the museum project was concerned, with Berlin city politics now dominated by parties from the west, everything changed.

When Fritz and Gertrud Kühn died their son Achim was a university student, studying Architecture at Weimar. Achim and his wife Helgard now took over their father's workshop and continued the business. They were driven from the start by a determination to celebrate and conserve Fritz Kühn's legacy. There was also already a plan in place, which they refined over time, to create a Fritz Kühn museum. During the East German years Fritz Kühn was an officially eulogised celebrity, and there was no obvious sense of urgency in creating a museum celebrating his life and work. Since 1989 and reunification, official positions have become more ambivalent, and the museum project remains unrealised: as the family's enthusiasm for it has resonated more strongly, the project has been increasingly hampered by lack of funds and opposition from local government. There have been (imprecise and vaguely supported) suggestions appearing in the press that Fritz Kühn only received the necessary permissions to start work on his new studio-workshop back in 1958 because he was inappropriately "close to" party members and officials in the East German government.

== Publications (selection) ==
=== Photography ===
- Sehen und Gestalten – Natur und Menschenwerk. E. A. Seemann, Leipzig 1951.
- Aus meiner Gräsermappe. Anregungen und Gedanken eines Kunsthandwerkers. E. A. Seemann, Leipzig 1953.
- Licht – Land – Wasser. Erlebnisse auf einer Insel. Verlag der Nation, Berlin 1958.
- Kompositionen in Schwarz und Weiß. Bekenntnisse in Bildern. Bruckmann, München 1959.
- Stufen. Henschel, Berlin und Callwey, München 1964.
- Gottes harte Herrlichkeit. Evangelische Verlagsanstalt, Berlin 1964.

=== Metals art ===
- Geschmiedetes Eisen. 1941, 15. Aufl. Wasmuth, Tübingen, ISBN 3-8030-5016-2.
- Geschmiedetes Gerät. 1954, 4. Aufl. Wasmuth, Tübingen, ISBN 3-8030-5017-0.
- Stahlgestaltung – Entwurfslehre des Kunstschmiedens. 1959, 4. Aufl. Wasmuth, Tübingen, ISBN 3-8030-5018-9.
- Schmiedeeisen – Vom Werden eines Handwerks, Einführung und Erläuterungen von Professor Fritz Kühn, in: Die Schatzkammer – Band 21, Prisma-Verlag Zenner und Gürchott, Leipzig 1967, Lizenz Nr. 359/425/11/71
- Eisen und Stahl – Werkstattbuch der Schmiedekunst. Augustus-Verlag, Augsburg 1989. ISBN 3-8043-2715-X.
- Sabine Schulte: Kreis, Kreuz und Kosmos, Hans Schwipperts Innenraum für die Berliner Hedwigskathedrale, Berlin 2016, ISBN 978-3-941675-83-4
