= Futa Pass Cemetery =

Cemetery in Firenzuola, Italy

Coordinates: 44.096125°N 11.272047°E

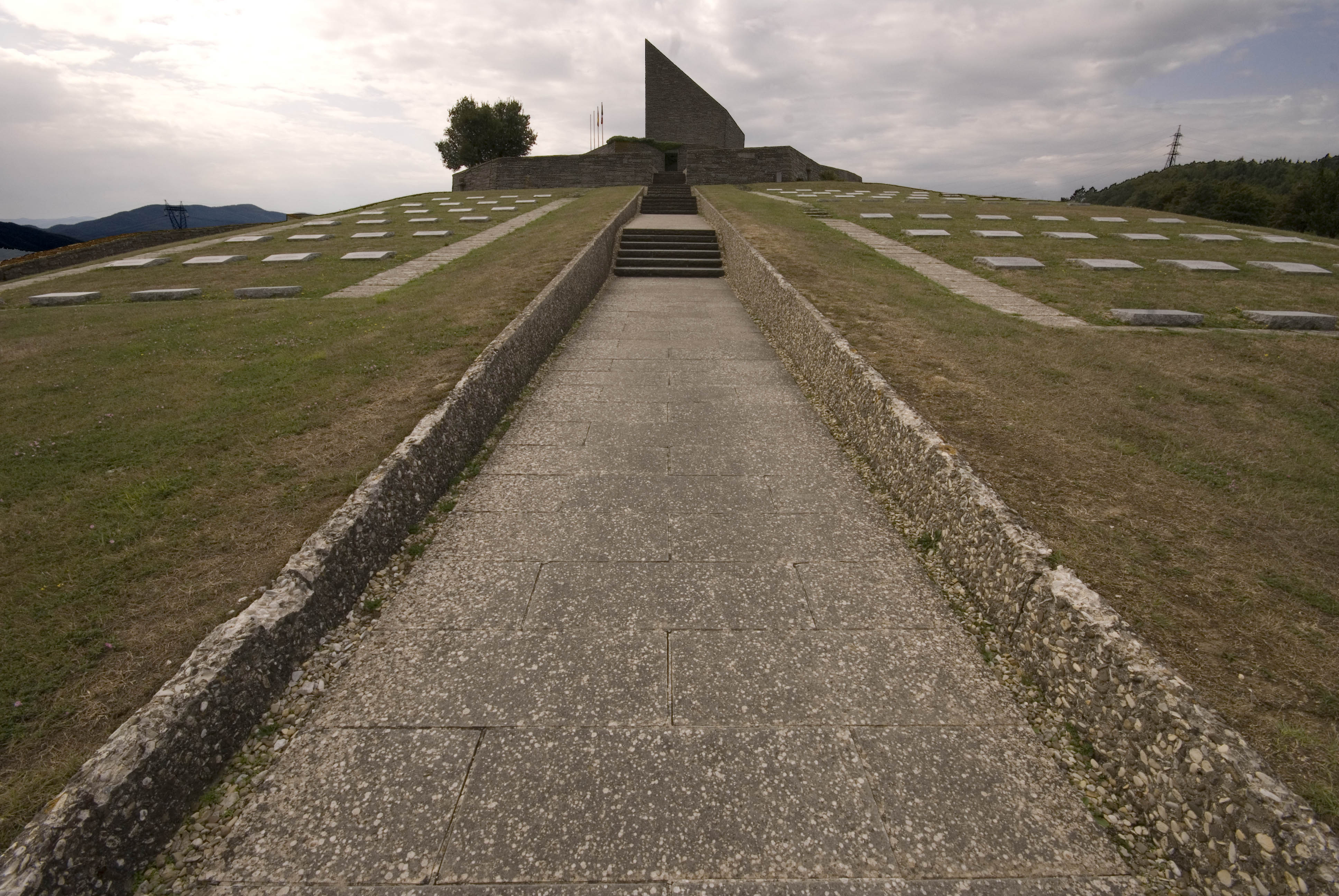
German War Cemetery at Futa Pass

The German Futa Pass Cemetery (Deutsche Soldatenfriedhof Futapass; Cimitero militare germanico della Futa) is a war cemetery in Italy. According to the German War Graves Commission it holds remains of 30,800 German soldiers who died in the Second World War. It is located at the summit of the Futa Pass (Passo della Futa, 903 m) in the Apennines and in Mugello, near Traversa in the commune of Firenzuola, that is, about 40 kilometers north of Florence and 40 kilometers south of Bologna along National Highway Nr. 65 near the border of Tuscany and Emilia-Romagna.

== History ==
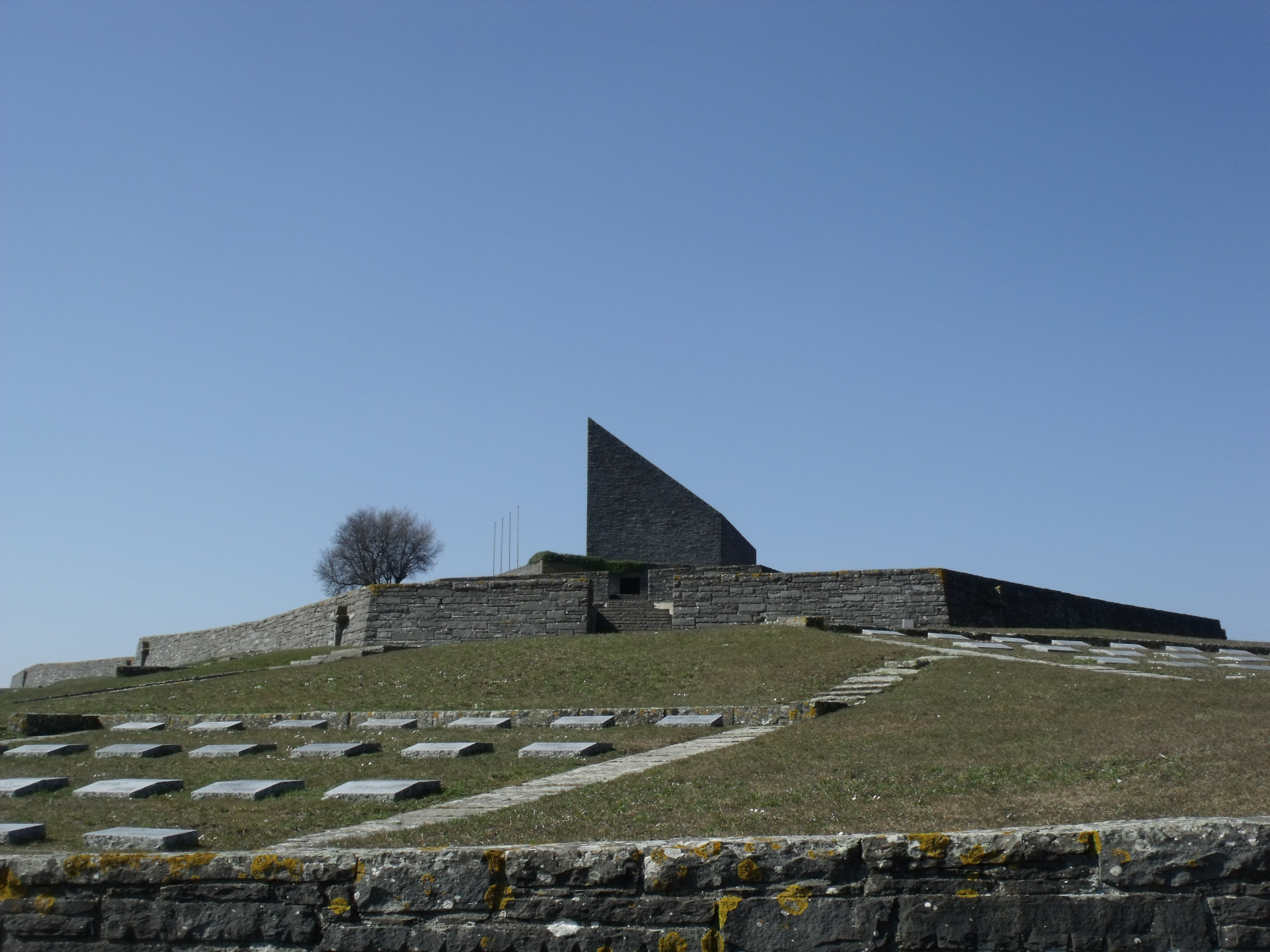
Headstones, wall and monument

The pass was part of the Gothic Line, meant to stop the Allied advance. It was the site of bitter combat between 9 and 21 April 1945, but most of the interred fell in late August 1944 between Carrara on the Ligurian Sea and the area surrounding Rimini.

In the wake of the 22 December 1955 Accord on War Graves between the BRD & Italy signed in Bonn and ratified by the Italian legislature 12 August 1957 as Law 801, in 1959 the German War Graves Commission entrusted oversight of the project to the architect Dieter Oesterlen. In the planning and execution he was assisted by the landscape architects Walter Rossow and Ernst Cramer and the sculptor Helmut Lander. The metalwork was by Fritz Kühn.

The reburied soldiers were collected from neighboring battlefields and churchyards in the provinces of Bologna, Metropolitan Florence, Forlì-Cesena, Lucca, Modena, Pesaro and Urbino, Pisa, Pistoia, Ravenna and Reggio Emilia; and a number of remains were also identified. With 30,683 graves it is the largest German cemetery in Italy.

== Cemetery and Monument ==
The cemetery covers 12 hectares with 16,000 granite headstones on 72 natural lawns, enclosed by a spiral 2000 meter long wall with 67 quarried crosses. Each pair of graves is marked with a 70×140 cm stone. The cemetery is capped by the pyramid-like peak at the end of the spiral wall. This last section of the wall encloses a "Court of Honor", beneath which is the crypt with 397 graves. A smaller crypt, named the "Cervia Room", contains gravestones from the former war cemetery at Cervia. The cemetery was dedicated on 28 June 1969.

== Gallery ==
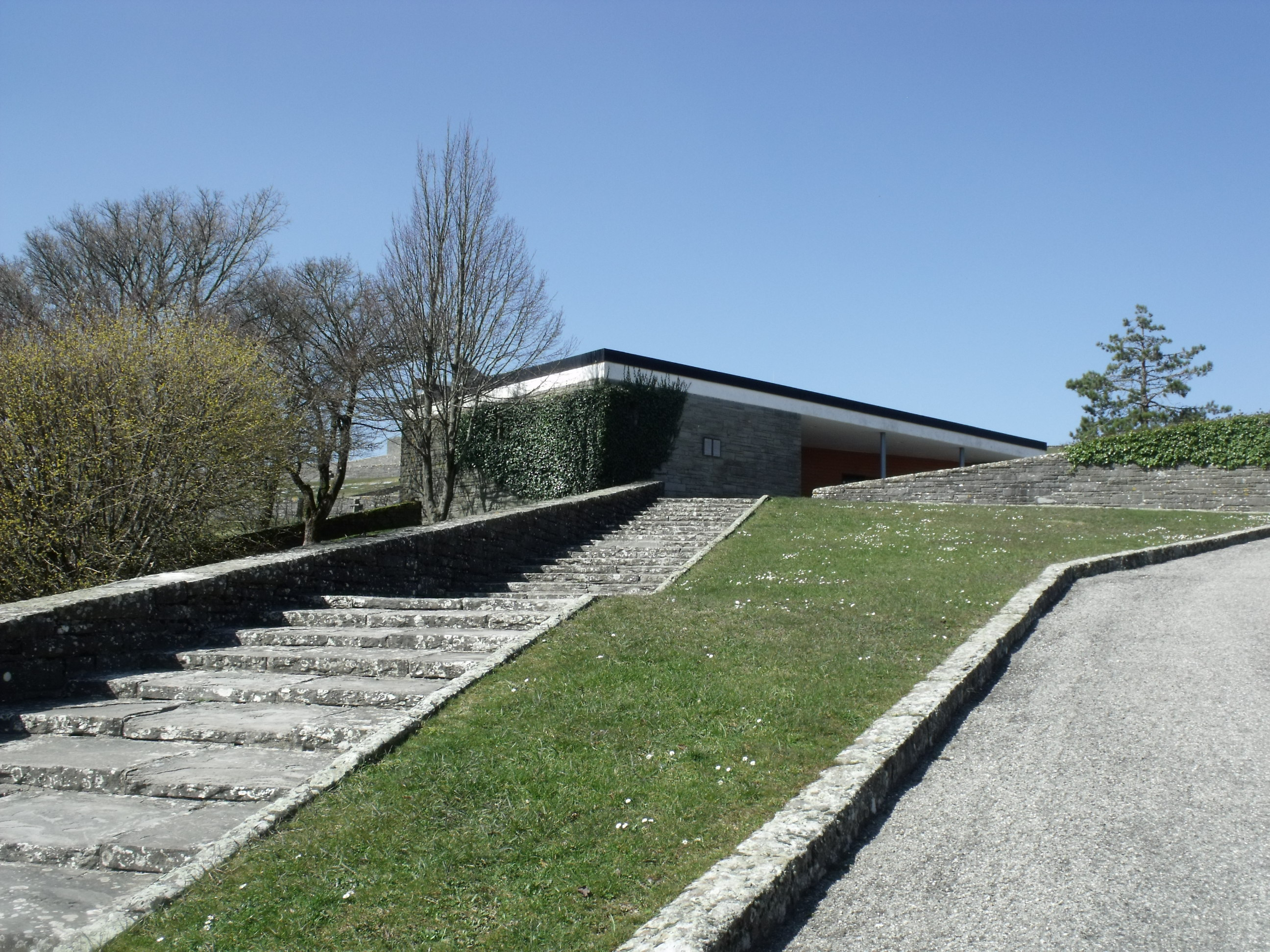
Entrance

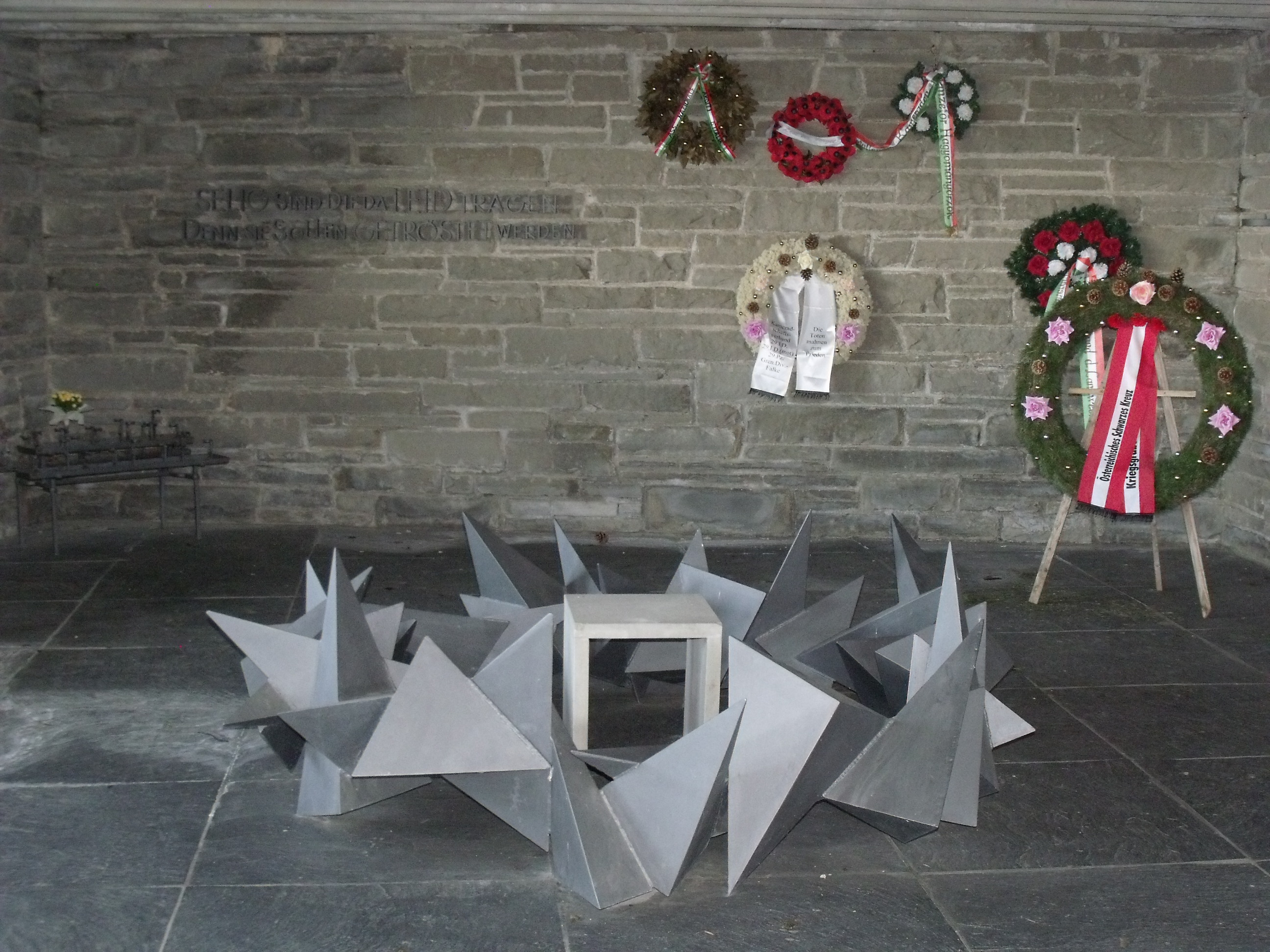
Memorial wall of the crypt

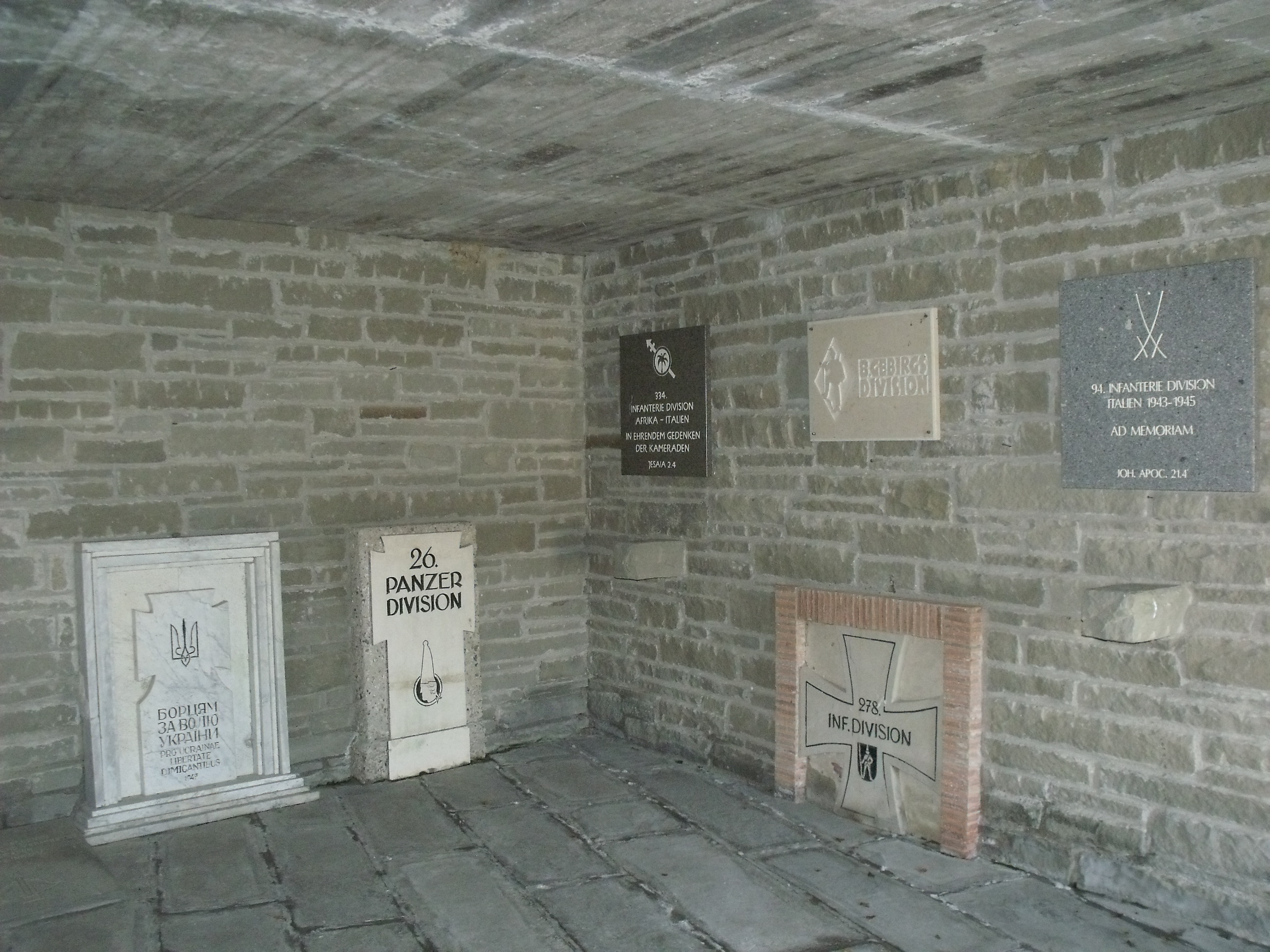
Cervia-Raum or small crypt

== Bibliography ==
- Birgit Urmson: German and United States Second World War Military Cemeteries in Italy: Cultural Perspectives (Transatlantic Aesthetics and Culture Vol. 8) (Bern 2018, ISBN 978-3-0343-3516-4 pb.)
- Francesco Collotti: Il paesaggio dei caduti. Dieter Oesterlen, Cimitero militare germanico. (Online version at academia.edu)
