= Futa Pass =

Mountain pass in Italy

Coordinates: 44°05′37″N 11°16′42″E

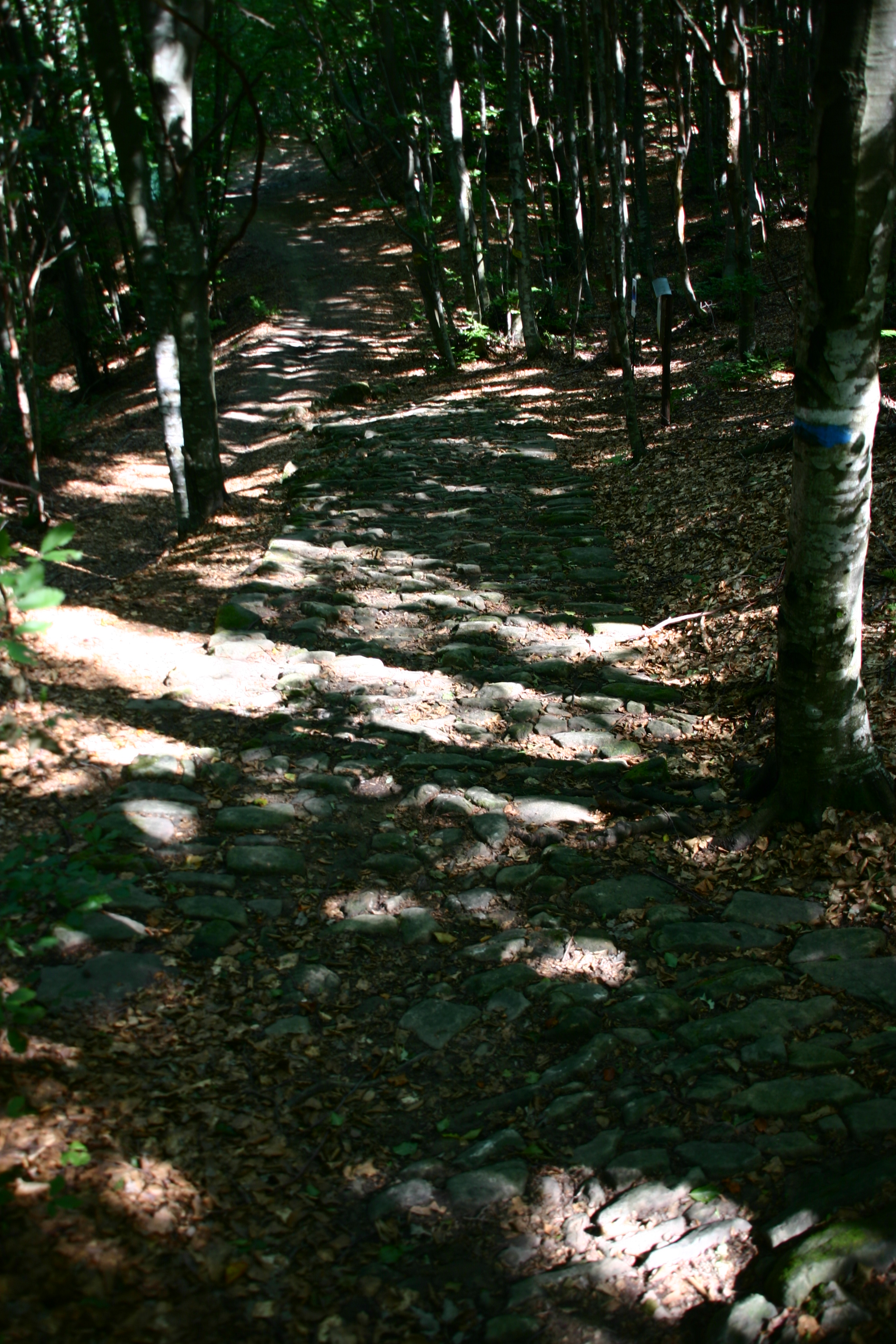
Roman road through Futa Pass

The Futa Pass or La Futa Pass (Italian: Passo della Futa) is a pass in the Tuscan-Emilian Apennines, at an elevation of 903 m (2,963 ft). It is located in the comune of Firenzuola, in the Metropolitan City of Florence. It separates the valleys of Mugello and of the Santerno River, and the Tuscan–Romagnol and Tuscan–Emilian Apennines. The nearby Raticosa pass, also within Firenzoula, is just a few kilometers away

It is crossed by the Strada statale 65 (strada della Futa) which connects Florence with Bologna. During World War II it was part of the Gothic Line. A German military cemetery was created nearby in the 1950s.

== History ==
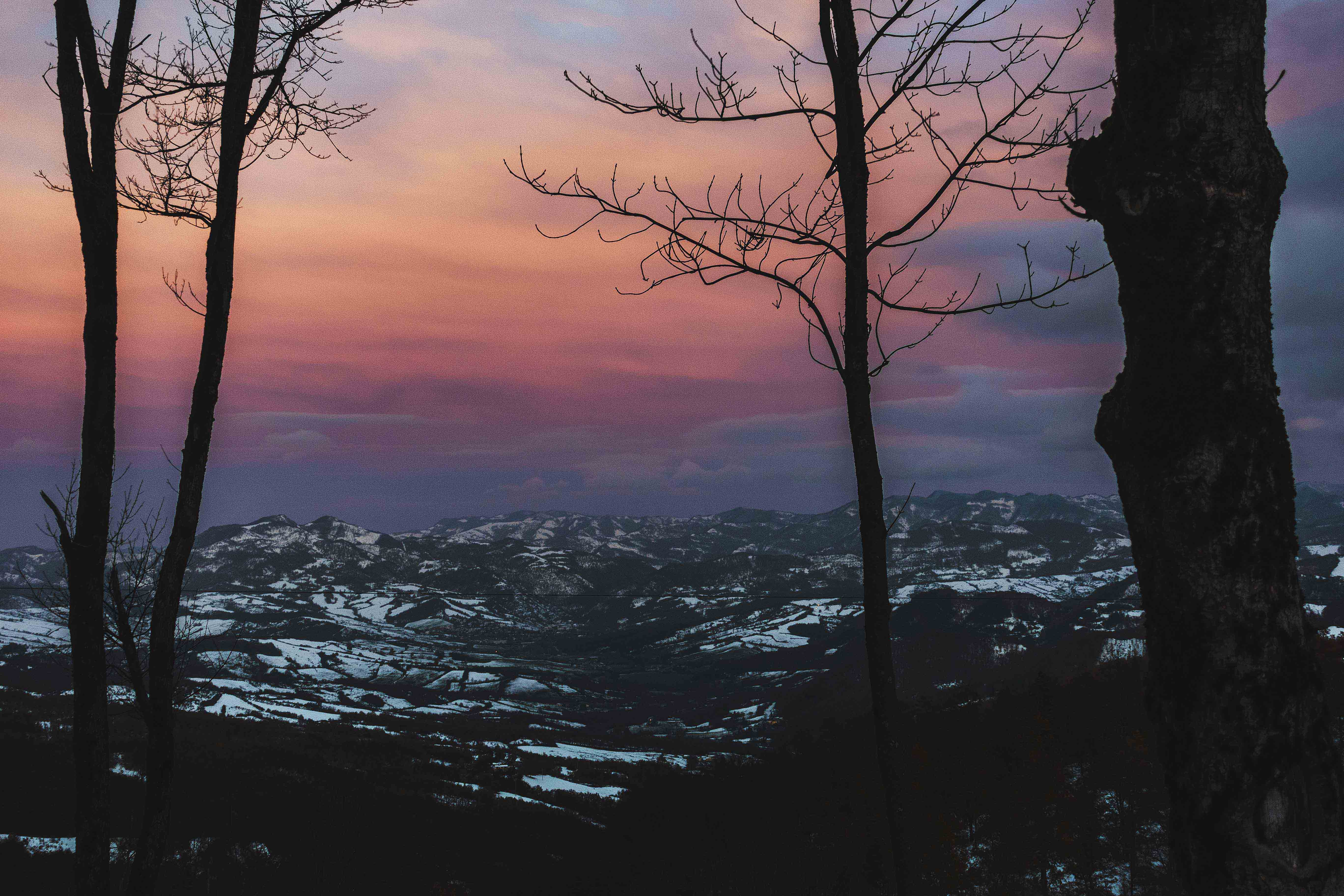
View from the Futa Pass on the Santerno Valley

In antiquity and the Middle Ages it was the only point of access to the Santerno and Senio valleys from Tuscany. In 1361, it was joined by Giogo Pass connecting Tuscany and Romagna. In 1759, the Strada statale 65 (Firenze–Bologna) was completed: since then the pass has become one of the busiest for crossing the Apennines.

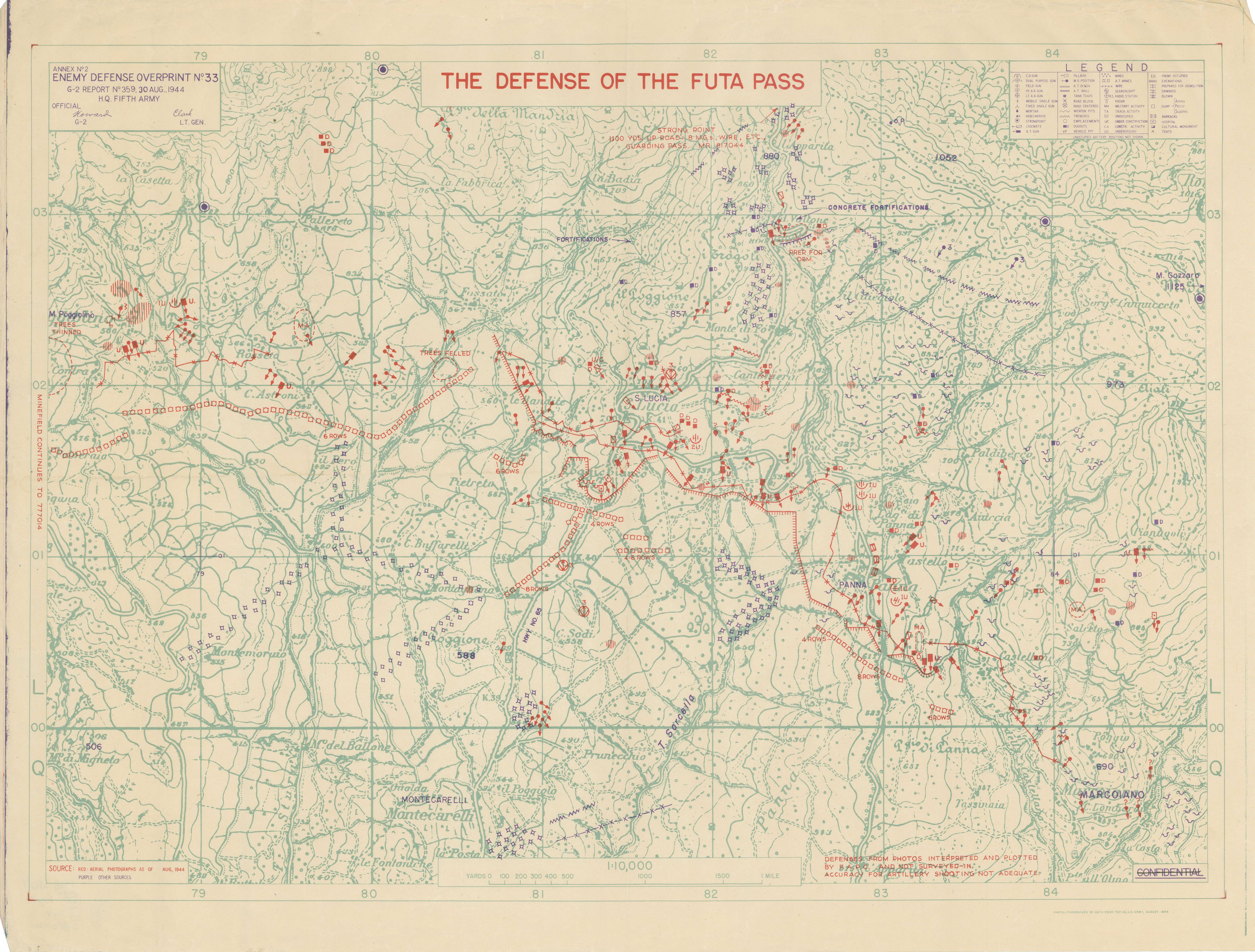
Military map of the Futa Pass, 30 August 1944 from the US Army

During World War II it was part of the Gothic Line. These positions were abandoned after the Allied breakthrough at the adjacent Il Giogo pass in Scarperia in September 1944.

Since the 1950s, it has been the site of an important German war cemetery, the Futa Pass Cemetery. After the opening of the Apennine section of the Autostrada del Sole on 3 December 1960, it is mainly used by the inhabitants of nearby villages for their journeys in the area, and by motorcyclists.

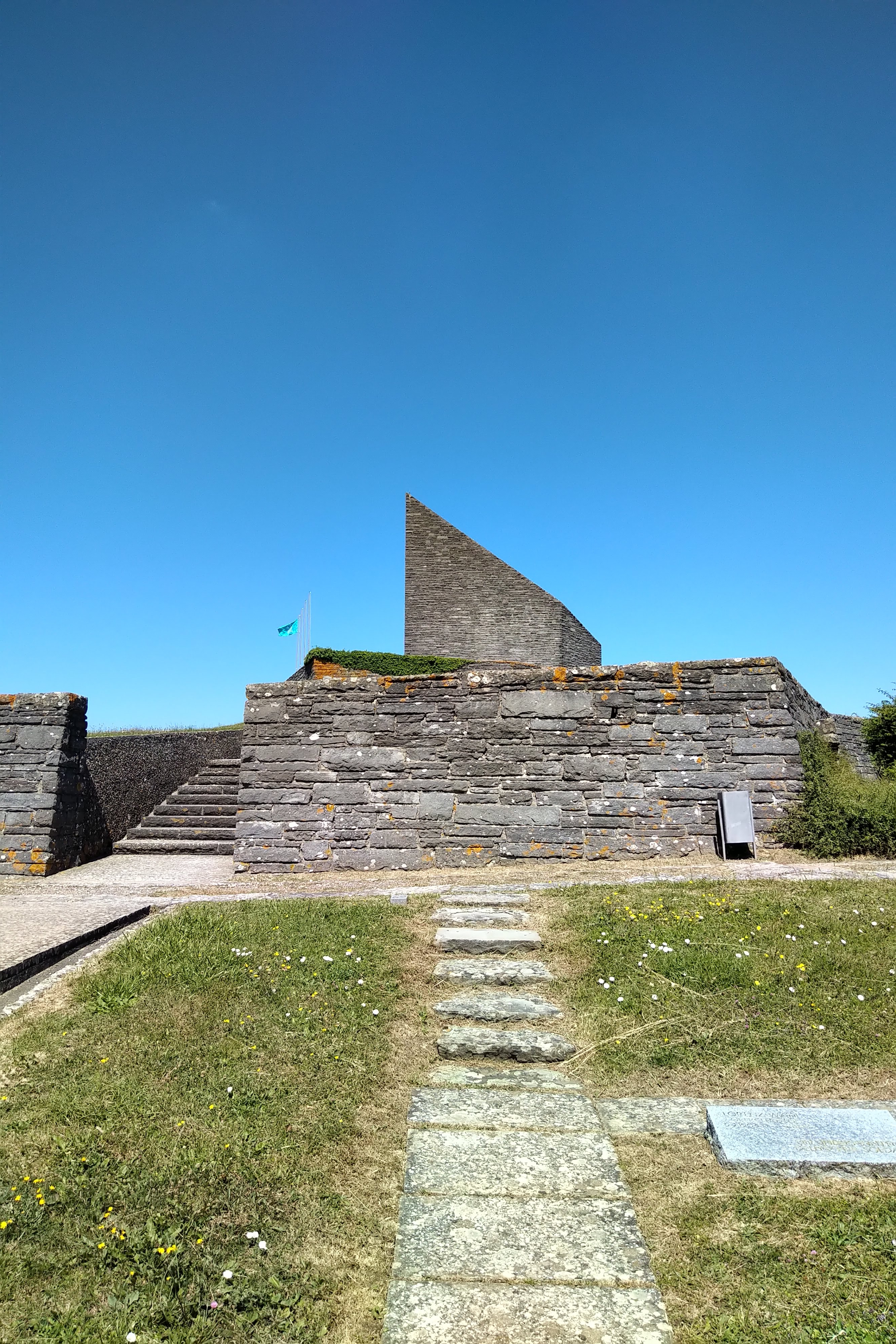
Futa Pass Cemetery

The pass was included in the route of most editions of the Mille Miglia (1927–1957).
