= Bohnsdorf =

- Quarter of Berlin
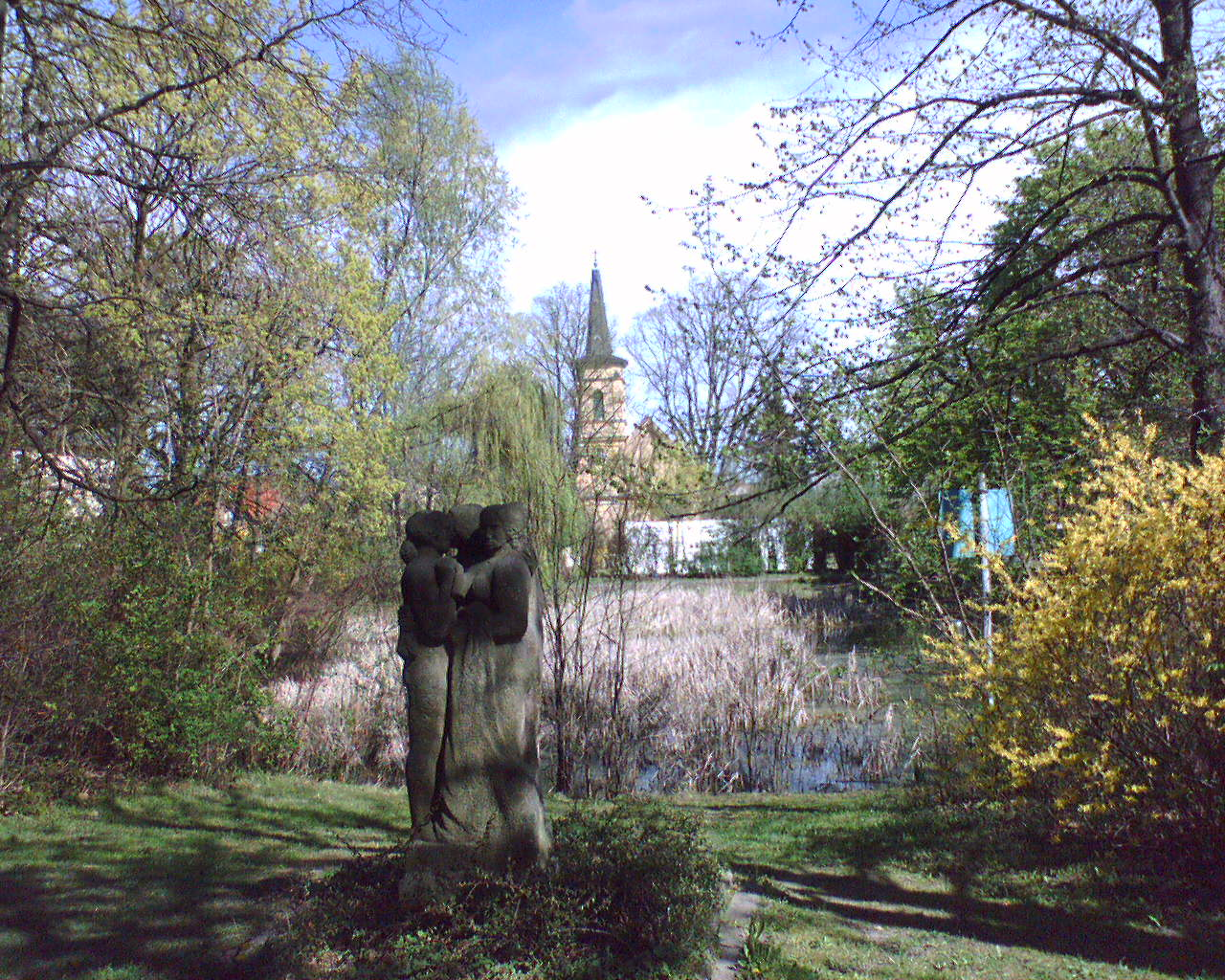
- Church and lake in Bohnsdorf

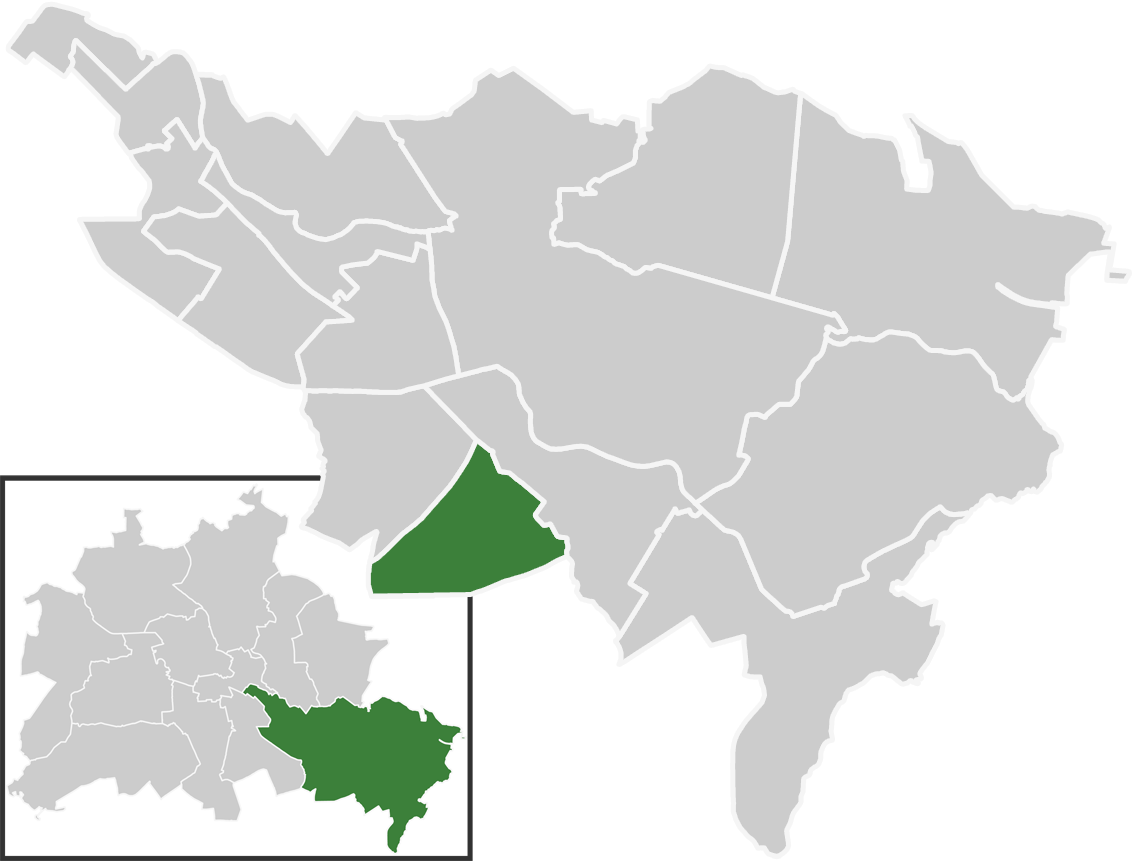
- Location of Bohnsdorf in Treptow-Köpenick and Berlin
- Interactive map of Bohnsdorf
- Location within Germany Location within Berlin
- Coordinates: 52°24′00″N 13°34′00″E
- Country: Germany
- State: Berlin
- City: Berlin
- Borough: Treptow-Köpenick
- Founded: 1375
- Subdivisions: 2 zones

Area
  - Total: 6.52 km^{2} (2.52 sq mi)
- Elevation: 34 m (112 ft)

Population (2024-12-31)
  - Total: 13,780
  - Density: 2,110/km^{2} (5,470/sq mi)
- Time zone: UTC+01:00 (CET)
  - Summer (DST): UTC+02:00 (CEST)
- Postal codes: 12524, 12526
- Vehicle registration: B

Bohnsdorf (German: [ˈboːnsˌdɔʁf]) is a locality in the borough Treptow-Köpenick of Berlin, Germany. It is located in the south-east of the city.

== History ==
The locality was first mentioned in 1375 with the name of Benistorp.

== Geography ==
=== Position ===
The locality is situated in the southeastern suburb of Berlin and borders with Altglienicke, Grünau, and with the municipality of Schönefeld, in the Brandenburg district of Dahme-Spreewald. Close to the village lies Berlin Brandenburg Airport. Previously when the airport was known as Berlin Schönefeld Airport before Brandenburg's construction the former runway 07L/25R ended near Bohnsdorf.

=== Trivia ===
Bohnsdorf gained some notoriety for its unsolvable traffic problems with the Bohnsdorfer Kreisel.

=== Parts ===
Bohnsdorf is not divided into zones. Parts of Bohnsdorf are (no subdivision)

- Falkenberg (north part)
- Falkenhorst (south-east part)

== Personalities ==
- Max Buntzel
- Emil Rudolf Greulich
- Fritz Kühn
