= 2011 =

2011 in various calendars
- Gregorian calendar: 2011; MMXI
- Ab urbe condita: 2764
- Armenian calendar: 1460; ԹՎ ՌՆԿ
- Assyrian calendar: 6761
- Baháʼí calendar: 167–168
- Balinese saka calendar: 1932–1933
- Bengali calendar: 1417–1418
- Berber calendar: 2961
- British Regnal year: 59 Eliz. 2 – 60 Eliz. 2
- Buddhist calendar: 2555
- Burmese calendar: 1373
- Byzantine calendar: 7519–7520
- Chinese calendar: 庚寅年 (Metal Tiger); 4708 or 4501 — to — 辛卯年 (Metal Rabbit); 4709 or 4502
- Coptic calendar: 1727–1728
- Discordian calendar: 3177
- Ethiopian calendar: 2003–2004
- Hebrew calendar: 5771–5772
- Hindu calendars
- Vikram Samvat: 2067–2068
- Shaka Samvat: 1932–1933
- Kali Yuga: 5111–5112
- Holocene calendar: 12011
- Igbo calendar: 1011–1012
- Iranian calendar: 1389–1390
- Islamic calendar: 1432–1433
- Japanese calendar: Heisei 23 (平成２３年)
- Javanese calendar: 1943–1945
- Juche calendar: 100
- Julian calendar: Gregorian minus 13 days
- Korean calendar: 4344
- Minguo calendar: ROC 100 民國100年
- Nanakshahi calendar: 543
- Thai solar calendar: 2554
- Tibetan calendar: ལྕགས་ཕོ་སྟག་ལོ་ (male Iron-Tiger); 2137 or 1756 or 984 — to — ལྕགས་མོ་ཡོས་ལོ་ (female Iron-Hare); 2138 or 1757 or 985
- Unix time: 1293840000 – 1325375999

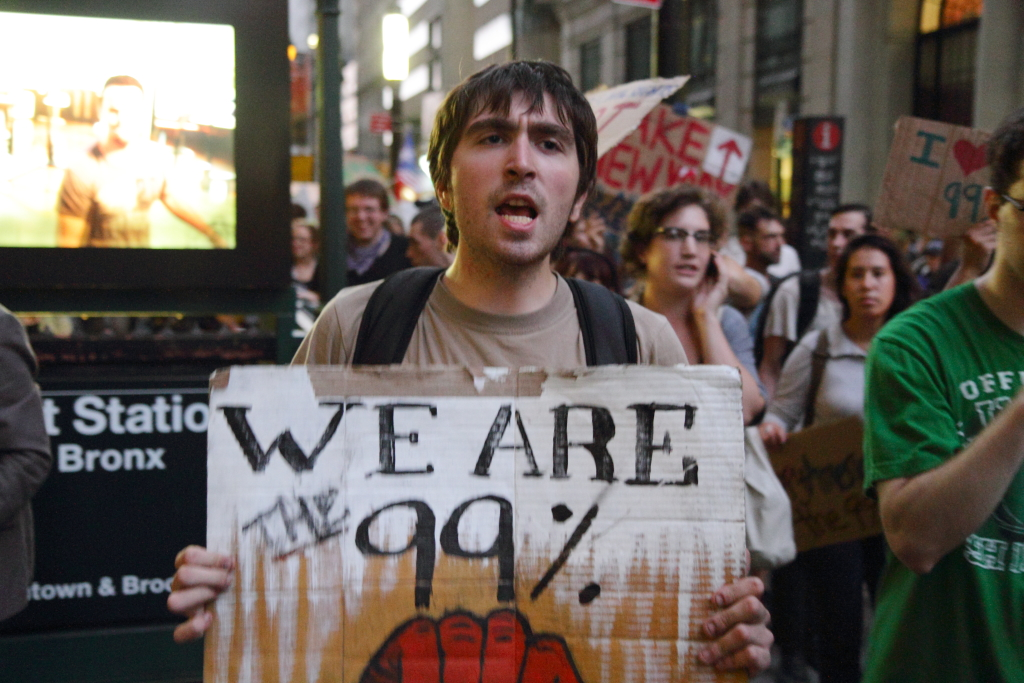
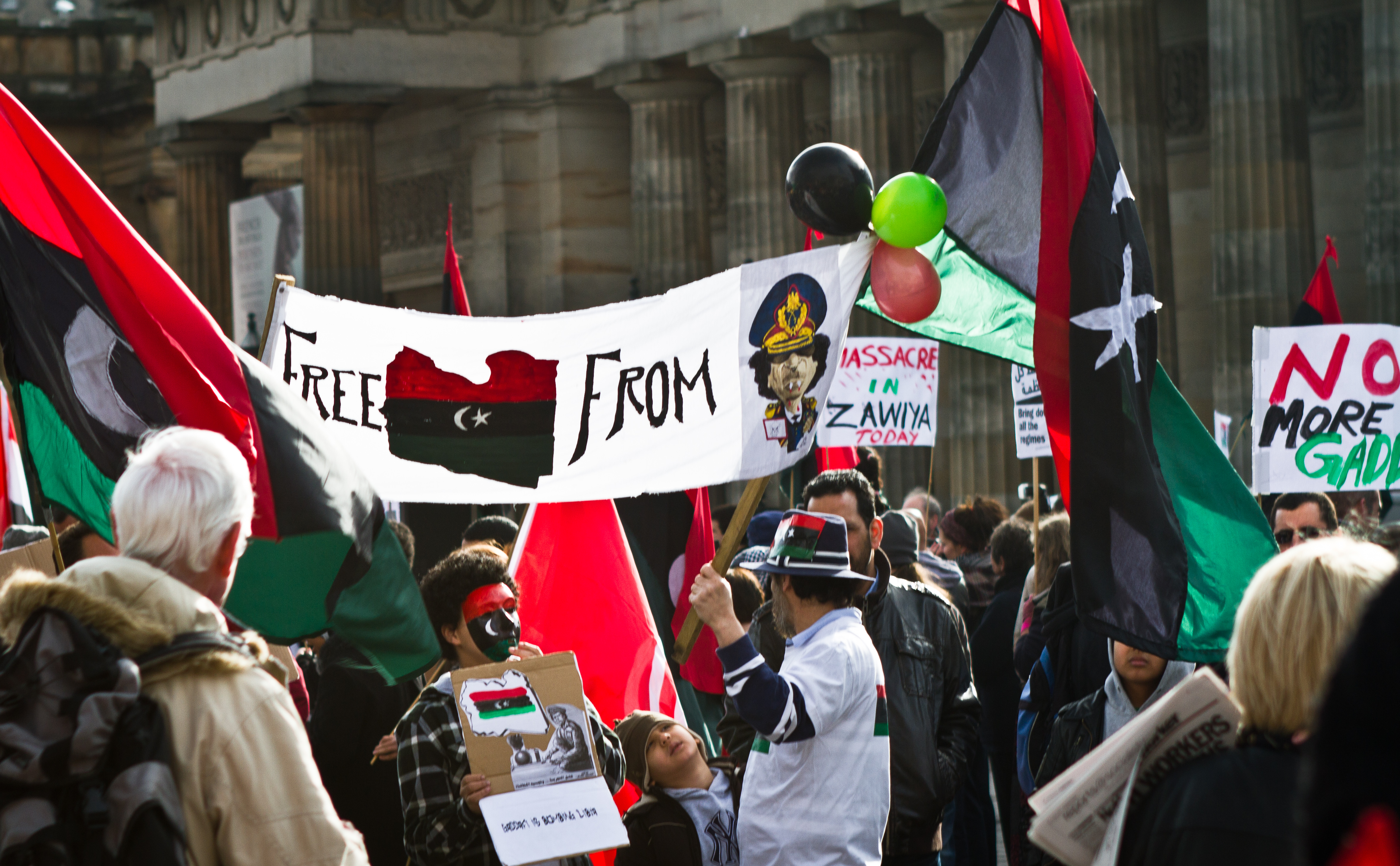
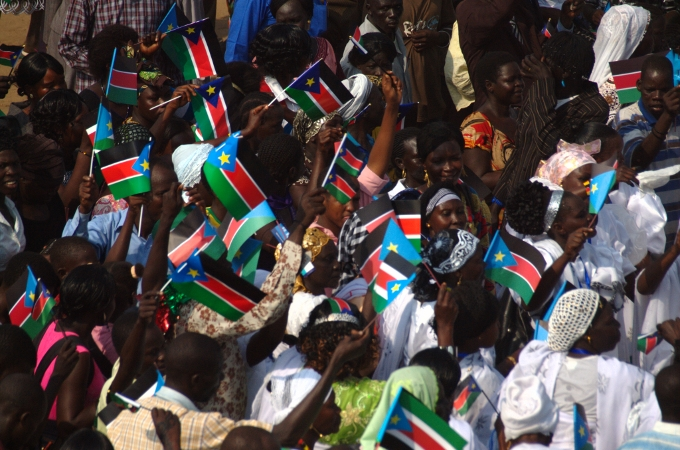
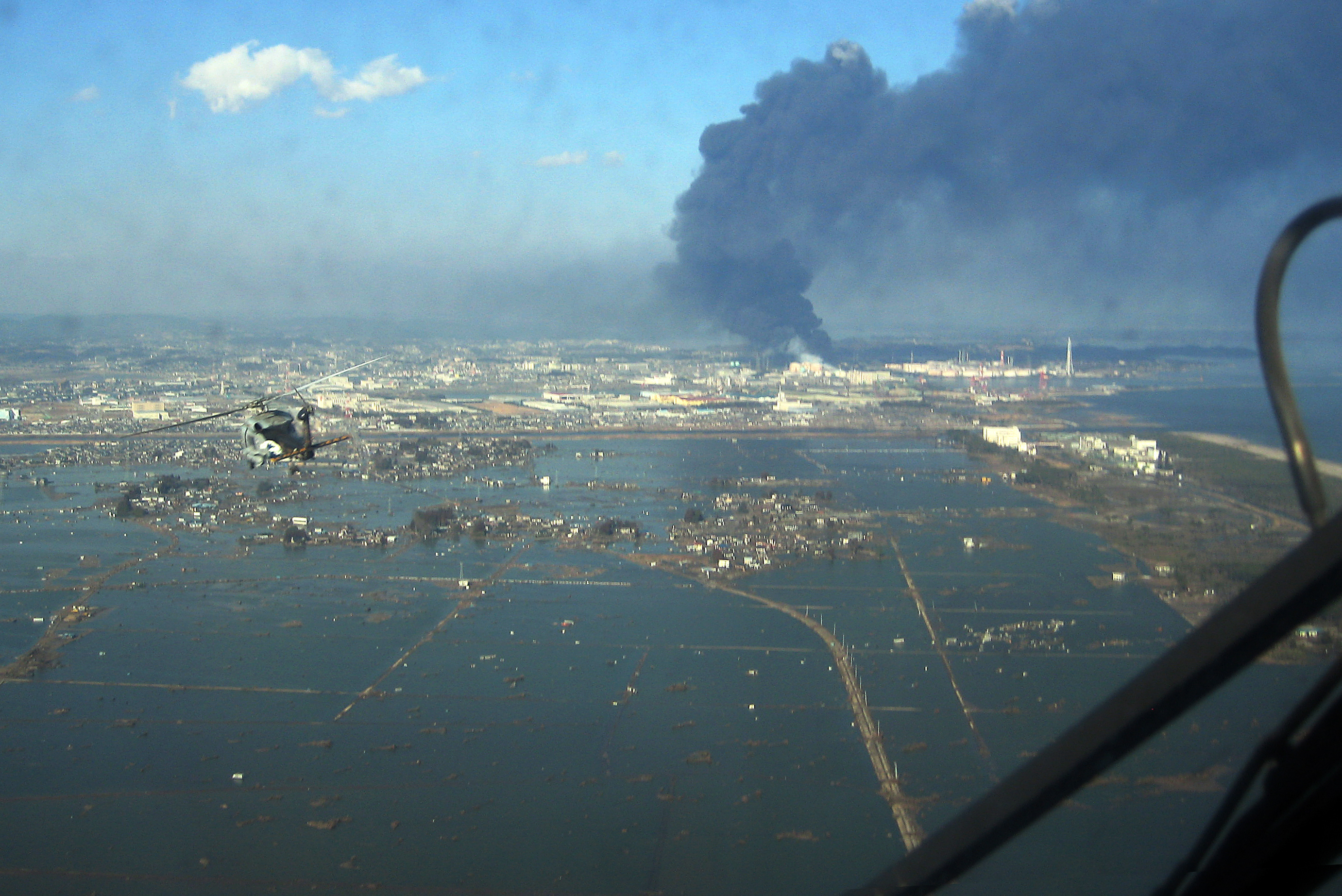
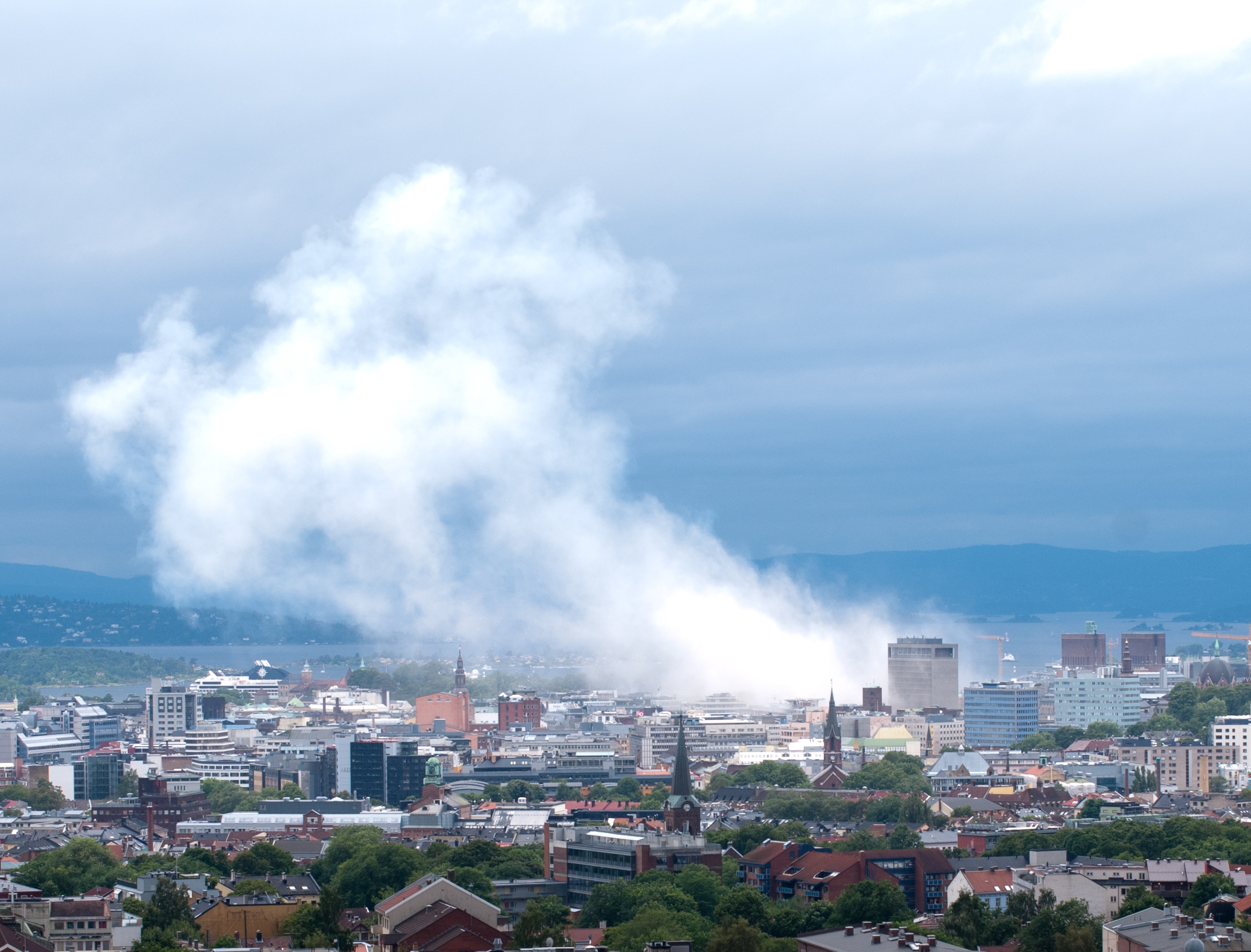
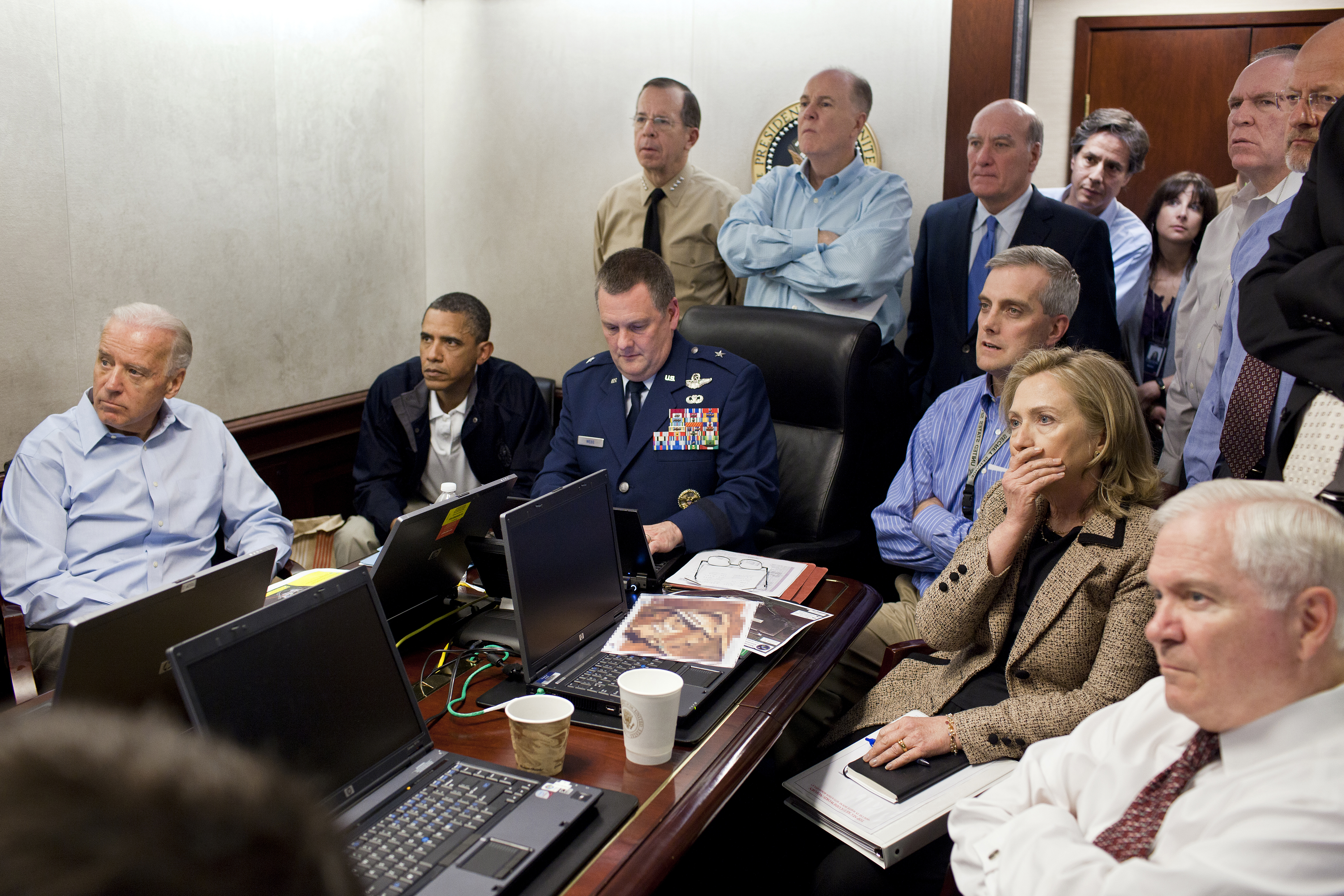
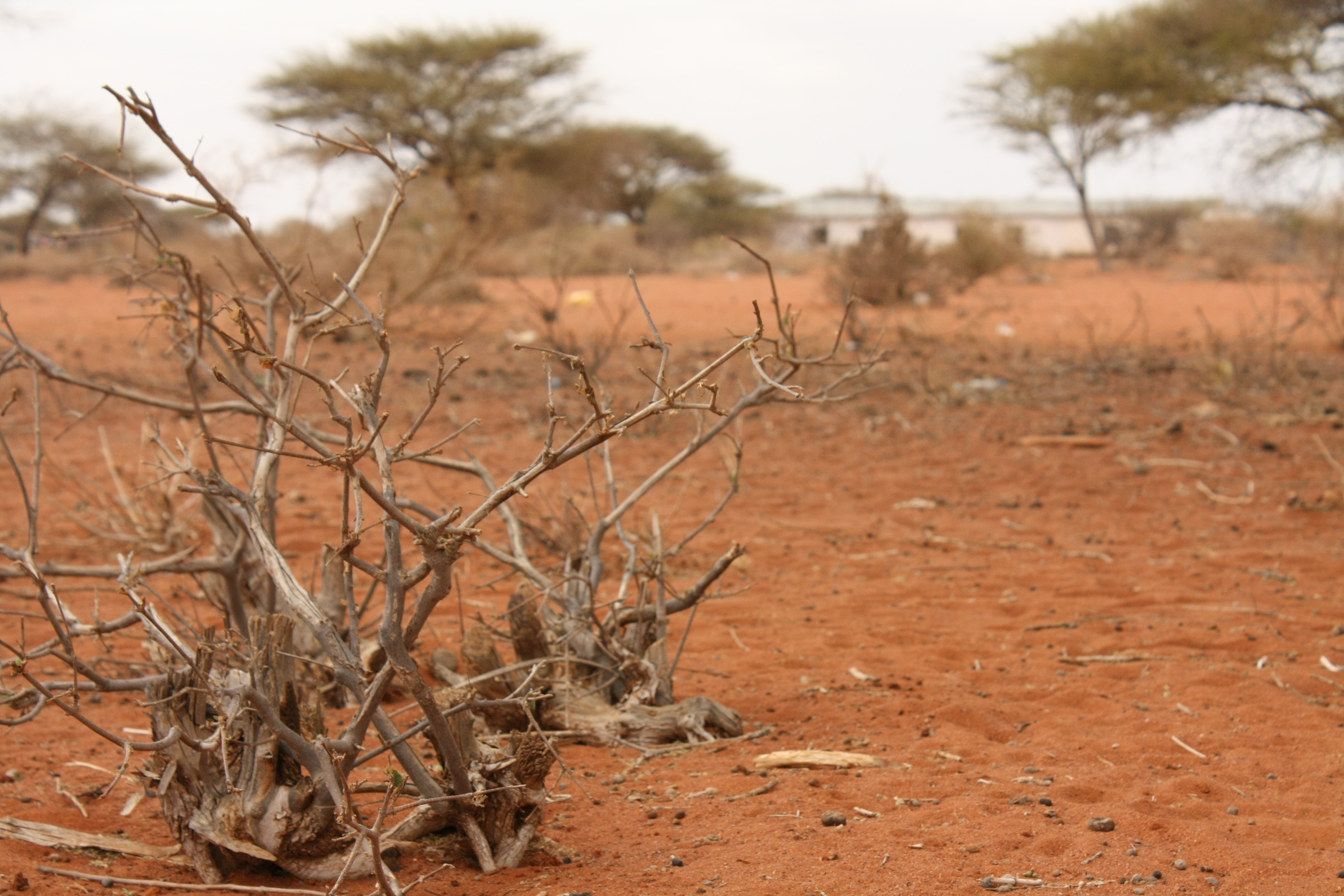
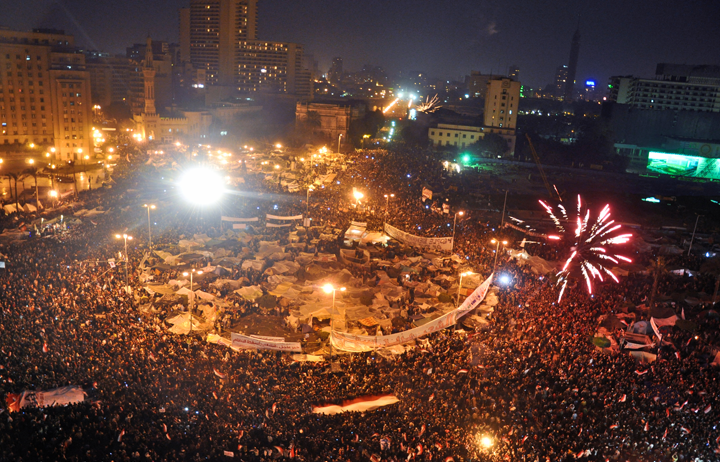
Clockwise from top to bottom left-right:
- A protester at Occupy Wall Street, which begins the Occupy movement;
- Protests against Libyan dictator Muammar Gaddafi, killed in October;
- Celebrating the independence of South Sudan, the world's newest country;
- Tōhoku earthquake and tsunami devastates Eastern Japan and kills nearly 20,000 people while initiating a major nuclear accident, becoming the most expensive natural disaster on record;
- Attacks in Norway kill 77 and mark the rise of Right-wing terrorism across the west;
- U.S. national security team gathered in the White House Situation Room to monitor progress of Operation Neptune Spear, resulting in the death of Al-Qaeda leader Osama bin Laden;
- A drought in East Africa kills 50,000–260,000 people;
- A block from Minecraft, released this year, which later becomes the world's best-selling video game;
- Anti-government protests known as the "Arab Spring" spread across the Middle East and North Africa, sparking revolutions in Tunisia, Egypt, Libya, Yemen, and Syria.

2011 (MMXI) was a common year starting on Saturday of the Gregorian calendar, the 2011th year of the Common Era (CE) and Anno Domini (AD) designations, the 11th year of the 3rd millennium and the 21st century, and the 2nd year of the 2010s decade.

The year marked the start of a series of protests and revolutions throughout the Arab world advocating for democracy, reform, and economic recovery, later leading to the depositions of world leaders in Tunisia, Egypt, and Yemen, and in some cases sparking civil wars such as the Syrian civil war and the first Libyan civil war, the latter giving way to the second Libyan civil war. The year also saw the rise of the Occupy movement, including Occupy Wall Street, a protest movement against social and economic inequality, corporate influence, and the financial system that spread across numerous countries worldwide.

U.S. Navy SEALs killed al-Qaeda leader and terrorist Osama bin Laden in his compound in Pakistan on May 2. The Curiosity rover, which was to land on Mars in August of the following year, launched from Cape Canaveral on November 26. In December, North Korean leader Kim Jong Il, who had been the supreme leader of North Korea since the death of his father Kim Il Sung in 1994, died while traveling by train to a place outside Pyongyang. He was succeeded by his son Kim Jong Un.

2011 was designated as:

- International Year of Forests
- International Year of Chemistry
- International Year for People of African Descent

In 2011, the nation of Samoa only had 364 days as it moved across the International Date Line skipping December 30, 2011; it is now 24 hours ahead of American Samoa.

== Events ==
=== January ===
- January 1
  - Estonia officially adopts the Euro currency and becomes the 17th Eurozone country.
  - A bomb explodes as Coptic Christians in Alexandria, Egypt leave a new year service, killing 23 people.
  - Flight 348 with 134 occupants, operated by Metrojet, catches fire while taxiing out for take-off. Three people are killed and 43 are injured, four critically, from smoke inhalation or burns.
- January 4 – Tunisian street vendor Mohamed Bouazizi dies after setting himself on fire a month earlier, sparking anti-government protests in Tunisia and later other Arab nations. These protests become known collectively as the Arab Spring.
- January 5 – Internet vigilante group Anonymous launches DoS attacks on government websites of Syria, Tunisia, Bahrain, Egypt, Libya, and Jordan in response to the Arab Spring protests.
- January 7 – A Bangladeshi teenage girl Felani Khatun, was shot dead by the Indian Border Security Force (BSF) on the Anantapur border area under Phulbari upazila in Kurigram. Her body was hanging from the fence for four and half hours. Global human rights organizations, including the media, became protesters.
- January 9 – Iran Air Flight 277 crashes near Orumiyeh in the northeast of the country, killing 78 people.
- January 14 – The Tunisian government falls after a month of increasingly violent protests; President Zine El Abidine Ben Ali flees to Saudi Arabia after 23 years in power.
- January 15 – The result of the South Sudanese independence referendum, 2011 is in favour of independence, paving the way for the creation of the new state in July.
- January 24 – 37 people are killed and more than 180 others are wounded in a bombing at Domodedovo International Airport in Moscow, Russia.
- January 25 – The 2011 Egyptian revolution begins.
- January 27 – Within Ursa Minor, H1504+65, a white dwarf with the hottest known surface temperature in the universe at 200,000 K, was documented.
- January 28 – Friday of anger (Egyptian revolution of 2011). Protestors clash with security forces which resulted in over 600 protestors estimated dead and several police stations were raided.

=== February ===
- February 10 – Manx2 Flight 7100, a Fairchild Metro III, crashes on its third attempt at landing at Cork airport, Ireland from Belfast. Six of the twelve passengers and crew are killed.
- February 11 – Egyptian President Hosni Mubarak resigns after widespread protests calling for his departure, leaving control of Egypt in the hands of the military, until a general election can be held.
- February 14 – The Day of Rage in Bahrain begins, which marks the first day of the 2011 Bahraini uprising.
- February 15 – The First Libyan Civil War starts.
- February 19–April 2 – The 2011 Cricket World Cup is held in India, Bangladesh, and Sri Lanka with India defeating Sri Lanka in the final.
- February 22–March 14 – Uncertainty over Libyan oil output causes crude oil prices to rise 20% over a two-week period following the Arab Spring, causing the 2011 energy crisis.
- February 22 – A 6.3 magnitude earthquake strikes Christchurch, in what becomes New Zealand's third-deadliest natural disaster. 185 people are killed, many ESL students within the CTV Building, and the city centre and 10,000 homes are destroyed. Many foreign search and rescue workers respond to the event.
- February 26 – The Nintendo 3DS has its first release in Japan, following later releases in Europe on March 25, North America on March 27, and Australia on March 31.

=== March ===
- March 5 – Egyptian protestors storm the State Security headquarters in the Nasr City district of Cairo.
- March 6 – Civil uprising phase of the Syrian Civil War is triggered when 15 youths in Daraa are arrested for scrawling graffiti on their school wall denouncing the regime of President Bashar al-Assad.
- March 11 – A 9.1-magnitude earthquake and subsequent tsunami hit the east of Japan, killing upwards of 20,000 people and leaving another 2,553 missing. Tsunami warnings are issued in 50 countries and territories. Emergencies are declared at four nuclear power plants affected by the quake. As a result of the March 11 earthquake and tsunami, multiple plants at the Fukushima Daiichi Nuclear Power Plant were damaged, several workers injured, and contaminants were released into the environment.
- March 15
  - Egypt’s Ministry of Interior dissolves the widely feared and hated State Security Investigations Service accused of human rights abuses and announced the establishment of the new National Security Agency will replace it and take over its internal security duties.
  - Hamad bin Isa Al Khalifa, King of Bahrain, declares a three-month state of emergency as troops from the Gulf Co-operation Council are sent to quell the civil unrest.
  - Protests breakout across Syria demanding democratic reforms, resignation of President Bashar al-Assad, and release of those imprisoned for the March 6 Daraa protest. The government responds by killing hundreds of protesters and laying siege to various cities, beginning the Syrian Civil War, which lasts until Assad’s overthrow in 2024.
- March 17 – The United Nations Security Council votes 10–0 to create a no-fly zone over Libya in response to allegations of government aggression against civilians.
- March 19 – In light of continuing attacks on Libyan rebels by forces in support of leader Muammar Gaddafi, military intervention authorized under UNSCR 1973 begins as French fighter jets make reconnaissance flights over Libya.

=== April ===
- April 7 – The Israel Defense Forces use their Iron Dome missile system to successfully intercept a BM-21 Grad launched from Gaza, marking the first short-range missile intercept ever.
- April 11 – Former Ivorian President Laurent Gbagbo is arrested in his home in Abidjan by supporters of elected President Alassane Ouattara, with support from French forces; this effectively ends the 2010–11 Ivorian crisis and civil war.
- April 15 – The Mexican town of Cherán is taken over by vigilantes in response to abuses from the local drug cartel. The new government is strongly focused on crime reduction and preserving the local environment.
- April 17 – The 2011 PlayStation Network outage begins, becoming one of the largest data breaches ever recorded, and exposing personal data from 77 million accounts on the platform. The outage lasted 23 days.
- April 24 – The 2011 Guantanamo Bay files leak occurs, WikiLeaks and other organisations publishing 779 classified documents about Guantanamo Bay detainees, and it had been exposed 150 innocent citizens from Afghanistan and Pakistan were held in the camp without trial and detainees being as young as 14 years old.
- April 25–28 – The 2011 Super Outbreak occurs in the Southern, Midwest and Eastern United States with a tornado count of 362; killing 324 and injuring over 2,200.
- April 29 – An estimated two billion people watch the wedding of Prince William, Duke of Cambridge and Catherine Middleton at Westminster Abbey in London.

=== May ===
- May 1 – U.S. President Barack Obama announces that Osama bin Laden, the founder and leader of the militant group Al-Qaeda, was killed on May 2, 2011 (PKT, UTC+05) during an American military operation in Pakistan.
- May 10–14 – The Eurovision Song Contest 2011 takes place in Düsseldorf, Germany, and is won by Azeri entrants Ell & Nikki with the song "Running Scared".
- May 11 – A 5.1 earthquake strikes southern Spain, killing 9 people and injuring over 400.
- May 16 – The European Union agrees to a €78 billion rescue deal for Portugal. The bailout loan will be equally split between the European Financial Stabilisation Mechanism, the European Financial Stability Facility, and the International Monetary Fund.
- May 18 – Porto beats Braga 1–0 in the 2011 UEFA Europa League final at the Aviva Stadium.
- May 21 – Grímsvötn, Iceland's most active volcano, erupts and causes disruption to air travel in Northwestern Europe.
- May 22 – The 2011 Joplin tornado, an EF5 tornado, strikes Joplin, Missouri, killing 158 people and injuring 1,150.
- May 24 – The 2011 El Reno–Piedmont tornado, an EF5 tornado, strikes El Reno and Piedmont, Oklahoma, killing 9 people and injuring 181.
- May 26 – Former Bosnian Serb Army commander Ratko Mladić, wanted for genocide, war crimes and crimes against humanity, is arrested in Serbia.
- May 28 – Barcelona beats Manchester United 3–1 in the 2011 UEFA Champions League final at the Wembley Stadium.

=== June ===
- June 4 – Chile's Puyehue volcano erupts, causing air traffic cancellations across South America, New Zealand and Australia, and forcing over 3,000 people to evacuate.
- June 6 – Twitch.tv, a video game-focused live streaming service, is launched as a spinoff from Justin.tv.
- June 15 – A riot broke out in Vancouver, British Columbia in the aftermath of the Boston Bruins' win over the Vancouver Canucks in game seven of the 2011 Stanley Cup Finals.
- June 20 – Pakistani teenager Zar Ajam and an Afghan man are executed by hanging at Pul-e-Charkhi prison for the February 2011 terrorist attack on a bank in Jalalabad.
- June 22 – Former Winter Hill Gang leader James "Whitey" Bulger is arrested in Santa Monica, California following an anonymous tip.
- June 26–July 17 – The 2011 FIFA Women's World Cup takes place in Germany, and is won by Japan.
- June 28 – The Food and Agriculture Organization announces the eradication of the cattle plague rinderpest from the world.

=== July ===
- July 6 – The International Olympic Committee awards Pyeongchang the right to host the 2018 Winter Olympics.
- July 9 – South Sudan secedes from Sudan, per the result of the independence referendum held in January.
- July 12 – The planet Neptune completes its first orbit since it was discovered in 1846.
- July 14 – South Sudan joins the United Nations as the 193rd member.
- July 14–23 – Two frontal systems enter south-central Chile causing great snowfalls that leaves thousand of people isolated.
- July 20
  - Goran Hadžić is detained in Serbia, becoming the last of 161 people indicted by the International Criminal Tribunal for the former Yugoslavia.
  - The United Nations declares a famine in southern Somalia, the first in over 30 years.
- July 21 – Space Shuttle Atlantis lands successfully at Kennedy Space Center after completing STS-135, concluding NASA's Space Shuttle program.
- July 22 – In Norway, Anders Behring Breivik kills 8 people in a bomb blast which targeted government buildings in central Oslo, then kills 69 at a massacre at a Workers' Youth League camp on the island of Utøya.
- July 23 – Wenzhou train collision; 2 high speed trains in Wenzhou, China collided on a viaduct, sending multiple cars off the viaduct and crushing some. 40 people are killed and 192 people are injured.
- July 26 – A Royal Moroccan Air Force, a Lockheed C-130 Hercules, crashed while attempting a landing at Guelmim Airport in Morocco, killing all 80 people on board.
- July 31 – In Thailand over 12.8 million people are affected by severe flooding. The World Bank estimates damages at 1,440 billion baht (US$45 billion). Some areas are still six feet under water, and many factory areas remain closed at the end of the year. 815 people are killed, with 58 of the country's 77 provinces affected.

=== August ===
- August – Stock exchanges worldwide suffer heavy losses due to the fears of contagion of the Euro area crisis and the credit rating downgraded as a result of the debt-ceiling crisis of the United States.
- August 5
  - NASA announces that its Mars Reconnaissance Orbiter has captured photographic evidence of possible liquid water on Mars during warm seasons.
  - Juno, the first solar-powered spacecraft on a mission to Jupiter, is launched from Cape Canaveral Air Force Station.
- August 20 – First Air Flight 6560, a Boeing 737-210C, crashed on approach to Resolute Bay Airport, Nunavut, Canada, killing 12 out of the 15 occupants onboard.
- August 20–28 – Libyan rebels take control of the capital Tripoli, effectively overthrowing the government of Muammar Gaddafi.

=== September ===
- September 2 – 2011 Chilean Air Force C-212 crash. A CASA C-212 Aviocar military transport of the Chilean Air Force on a flight from Santiago to Robinson Crusoe Island, Chile, crashed into the sea while manoeuvring to land. All 21 passengers and crew on board were killed.
- September 5 – India and Bangladesh sign a pact to end their 40-year border demarcation dispute.
- September 9–October 23 – The 2011 Rugby World Cup is held in and won by New Zealand who beat France in the final.
- September 10 – The MV Spice Islander I, carrying at least 800 people, sinks off the coast of Zanzibar, killing 240 people.
- September 12 – Approximately 100 people die after a petrol pipeline explodes in Nairobi.
- September 16
  - 2011 Reno Air Races Crash: The Galloping Ghost , a North American P-51D Mustang racing aircraft, crashed into spectators while competing at the Reno Air Races in Reno, Nevada.
  - Snapchat was launched.
- September 17 – Occupy Wall Street protests begin in the United States. This develops into the Occupy movement which spreads to 82 countries by October.
- September 19 – With 436 people dead, the United Nations launches a $357 million appeal for victims of the 2011 Sindh floods in Pakistan.

=== October ===
- October 4 – The death toll from the flooding of Cambodia's Mekong river and attendant flash floods reaches 207.
- October 18
  - Gilad Shalit prisoner exchange: Israel and the Palestinian militant organization Hamas begin a major prisoner exchange, in which the captured Israeli Army soldier Gilad Shalit is released by Hamas in exchange for 1,027 Palestinian and Israeli-Arab prisoners held in Israel, including 280 prisoners serving life sentences for planning and perpetrating terror attacks.
  - Dozens of exotic animals were released from their enclosures at the Muskingum County Animal Farm in Zanesville, Ohio resulting in the need of local law enforcement to hunt and kill 48 animals including 18 tigers, 6 black bears, 2 grizzly bears, 2 wolves, 1 macaque monkey, 1 baboon, 3 mountain lions and 17 African lions.
- October 20
  - Libyan leader Muammar Gaddafi is killed in Sirte, with National Transitional Council forces taking control of the city and ending the war.
  - Basque separatist militant organisation ETA declares an end to its 43-year campaign of political violence, which has killed over 800 people since 1968.
- October 23 – A magnitude 7.2 M_{w} earthquake jolts eastern Turkey near the city of Van, killing over 600 people and damaging about 2,200 buildings.
- October 27 – After an emergency meeting in Brussels, the European Union announces an agreement to deal with the Euro area crisis which includes a writedown of 50% of Greek bonds, a recapitalisation of European banks and an increase of the bailout fund of the European Financial Stability Facility totaling to €1 trillion.
- October 29
  - A large snowstorm produced unusual amounts of early snowfall across the northeastern United States and the Canadian Maritimes, leaving 1.7 million people without power and disrupting travel.
  - Michael D. Higgins is elected President of Ireland.
- October 31
  - Date selected by the UN as the symbolic date when global population reached seven billion.
  - UNESCO admits Palestine as a member, following a vote which 107 member states support and 14 oppose.

=== November ===
- November 18 – Mojang Studios of Sweden officially release the video game Minecraft, which becomes the best-selling video game of all time.
- November 26 – The Mars Science Laboratory rover Curiosity, is launched from the Kennedy Space Center. It lands on Mars on August 6, 2012.
- November 30 – The United Kingdom severs diplomatic relations with Iran and expels diplomats, less than 24 hours after protesters attacked the British embassy in Tehran.

=== December ===
- December 16 – Tropical Storm Washi causes 1,268 flash flood fatalities in the Philippines, with 85 people officially listed as missing.
- December 17 – In North Korea, following the death of the country's leader, Kim Jong-il, the official reaction is grief and support for the succession of his son, Kim Jong Un.
- December 18 – The United States withdraws the last forces which effectively ends the Iraq War. While this ends the insurgency, it begins another.
- December 19 – Liechtenstein becomes the 26th member state of the Schengen Area.
- December 29 – Samoa and Tokelau move from east to west of the International Date Line, thereby skipping December 30, in order to align their time zones better with their main trading partners.

=== Full date unknown ===
- Bahrain-based Takaud Savings and Pensions B.S.C. provider is founded.

== Nobel Prizes ==

- Chemistry – Dan Shechtman
- Economics – Christopher A. Sims and Thomas J. Sargent
- Literature – Tomas Tranströmer
- Peace – Ellen Johnson Sirleaf, Leymah Gbowee and Tawakkol Karman
- Physics – Saul Perlmutter, Adam Riess, and Brian Schmidt
- Physiology or Medicine – Bruce Beutler, Jules A. Hoffmann, and Ralph M. Steinman

== New English words ==
- blockchain
