= EDDB =

EDDB may refer to:

- Berlin Schönefeld Airport, former ICAO code of airport up to 2020
- Berlin Brandenburg Airport, ICAO code of airport since 2020
