= Volcanic flight cancellation =

Volcanic flight cancellation or volcano airline crisis may refer to:

- 2011 Puyehue eruption#Transport disruption, in Chile, Argentina, New Zealand, Australia
- Air travel disruption after the 2011 Grímsvötn eruption, in Iceland, Europe
- Air travel disruption after the 2010 Eyjafjallajökull eruption, in Iceland, Europe
- 2010 eruptions of Mount Merapi#Air travel disruption, in Indonesia
