= Aeroflot Flight 892 =

1986 Tu-134 crash near Berlin

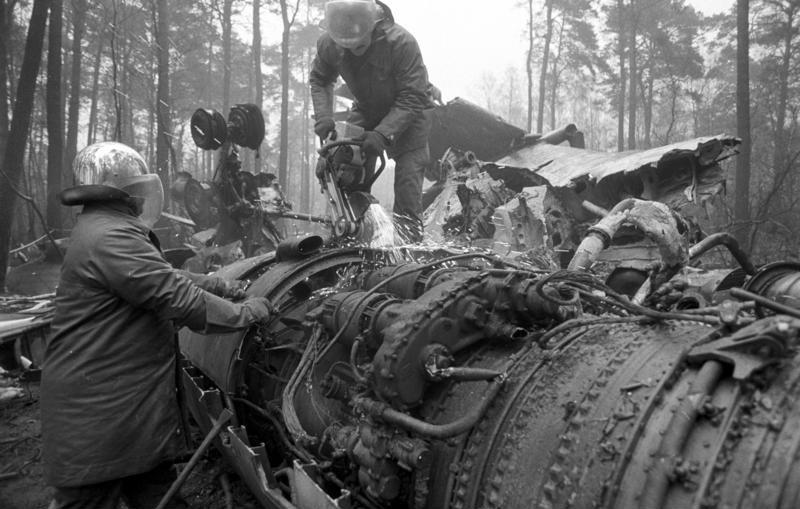
- Aftermath of the accident

Accident
- Date: 12 December 1986
- Summary: CFIT due to language misunderstanding
- Site: East Berlin; 52°24′N 13°36′E

Aircraft
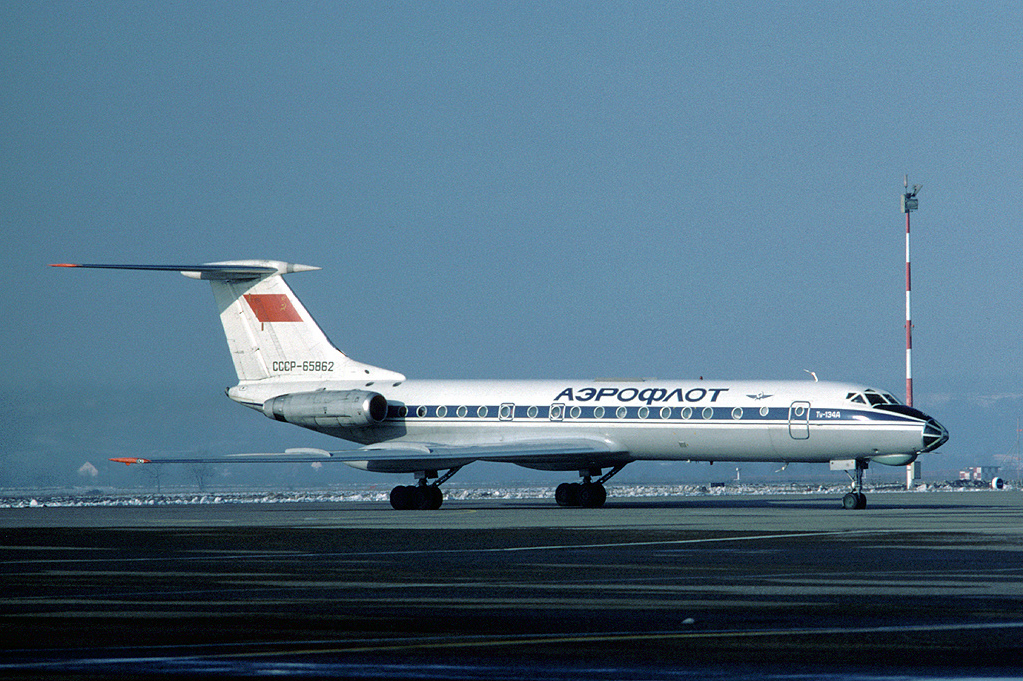
- An Aeroflot Tupolev Tu-134A, similar to that involved in the accident.
- Aircraft type: Tupolev Tu-134A
- Operator: Aeroflot
- Registration: СССР-65795
- Flight origin: Minsk National Airport
- Stopover: Prague Airport
- Destination: Berlin Schönefeld Airport
- Occupants: 82
- Passengers: 73
- Crew: 9
- Fatalities: 72
- Survivors: 10

Aeroflot Flight 892 was a scheduled international passenger flight from Minsk to East Berlin, which crashed on 12 December 1986 due to pilot error, killing seventy-two of the eighty-two passengers and crew on board.

== Accident ==
Due to adverse weather conditions, the scheduled flight from Minsk to East Berlin diverted to Prague. Once the weather in Berlin improved, the flight took off for the original destination. Upon arrival the conditions allowed only an ILS landing. The airport controller cleared the flight to land on runway 25L (left), but when the aircraft was entering final approach, the runway lights for runway 25R (right), which was undergoing renovation at the time and was closed, were turned on. The controller warned the crew in English that this was a test, but due to the lack of English language proficiency among the Aeroflot flight crew, the radio operator understood that this meant that the airplane was to land on runway 25R. The pilot disengaged the autopilot and manually changed the course to runway 25R, which was 460 meters to the right of runway 25L and 2200 meters nearer to the position of the aircraft. The error was noticed on the ground, but the warnings went unnoticed for some time due to discussion among the crew. The ILS signal was dropped. Once the crew realized their mistake, they rapidly changed course and engaged the autopilot, but without increasing the thrust of the aircraft's engines. The Tu-134 stalled and struck trees some 3 km from runway 25L's threshold. Upon impact, the fuel in the aircraft's tanks ignited. The rescue services found 12 survivors, but two later died in the hospital. In all, all 9 crew members and 63 passengers (including 20 of the 27 schoolchildren from class 10A of the Schwerin high school) lost their lives.
