= Interflug Flight 102 =

1989 East German plane crash

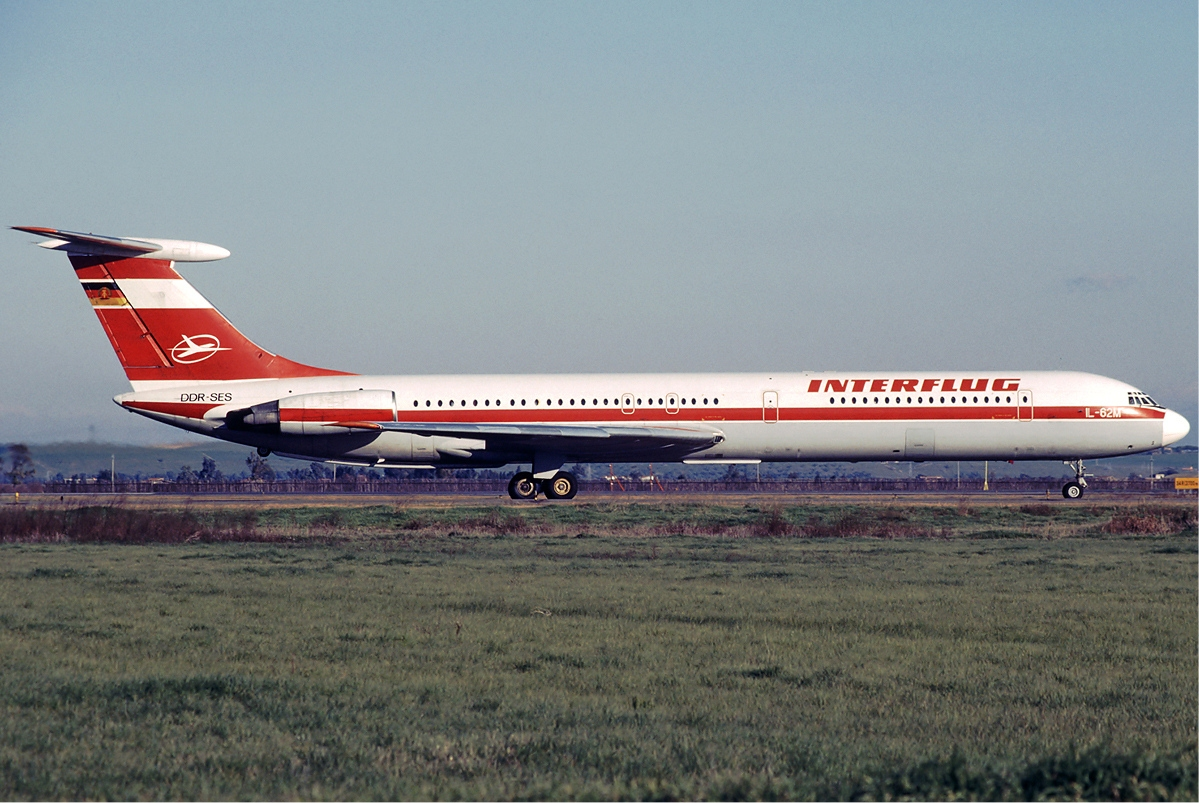
- An Interflug Il-62, similar to the one involved in the crash

Accident
- Date: 17 June 1989
- Summary: Runway excursion on take-off
- Site: Berlin Schönefeld Airport; 52.388333°N 13.52°E

Aircraft
- Aircraft type: Ilyushin Il-62M
- Operator: Interflug
- IATA flight No.: IF102
- ICAO flight No.: IFL102
- Call sign: INTERFLUG 102
- Registration: DDR-SEW
- Flight origin: Berlin Schönefeld Airport, East Berlin, East Germany
- Destination: Moscow-Sheremetyevo Airport, Russian SFSR, Soviet Union
- Occupants: 113
- Passengers: 103
- Crew: 10
- Fatalities: 21
- Survivors: 92

Interflug Flight 102 ended in a crash involving an Ilyushin Il-62M on 17 June 1989. The aircraft, while attempting to take off from Berlin Schönefeld Airport, East Germany, crashed into obstacles on the ground at the end of its takeoff, costing 21 lives.

== Incident ==
At 6:20 am Berlin time, the aircraft started its four Soloviev D-30KU engines to prepare for departure. The unlocking of the flight controls should have immediately followed. According to the cockpit voice recorder (CVR), the crew did not perform this task. The crew did not check the warning panel displaying the elevator condition. While the captain was taxiing to the runway, he checked a second time for elevator movement and failed to notice that the elevators were locked and unable to be moved.

The aircraft was cleared for takeoff on runway 25L and the engines were adjusted to a derated thrust level due to the airplane's low weight at departure of 113 tons. At 6:28:05 local time, the aircraft reached the rotation speed (VR). The crew pulled on the yoke to raise the nose of the airplane, but the plane did not respond. Four seconds later, the captain decided to abort the takeoff. At this moment, the speed of the plane was 293 km/h (158 kn; 182 mph). The flight engineer shut down all four engines, which prevented the use of reverse thrust. The plane was now traveling at 303 km/h (164 kn; 188 mph), 940 metres (3,080 ft) from the end of the runway.

The plane overran the end of the runway at 262 km/h (141 kn; 163 mph), veering left of the centerline. During the emergency braking, five of the tires on the main landing gear were destroyed. The plane entered a 40 cm (16 in) deep construction pit, causing the main landing gear to collapse. Active steering on this make of aircraft was not available at this time. The aircraft then collided with a water tank, concrete portions of the fence that surrounds the airport, a road embankment and six trees. This broke the plane into three pieces and caught fire. At 6:28:37 local time, the plane slid to a halt.

Rescue workers first arrived at the wreckage at 6:38, and rescued 82 passengers within the first 2 minutes. The front part of the fuselage containing the cockpit remained relatively intact, allowing some of the cabin and cockpit crew to use the cockpit window openings to escape the burning plane. The airline crew assisted the rescue workers in evacuating the passengers. The flames were fully extinguished by 8:09. The accident ultimately resulted in 21 fatalities; 19 died at the scene, while two more succumbed at the hospital. Contributing to the crash was the locking of some of the flight controls; whether this was due to a mechanical issue or the crew missing a step could not be proven.

== Aftermath ==
All eleven of Interflug's Il-62s were temporarily grounded with nine cleared to return to service the day after the crash.
