= List of presidential trips made by Barack Obama (2011) =

This is a list of presidential trips made by Barack Obama during 2011, the third year of his presidency as the 44th president of the United States.

This list excludes trips made within Washington, D.C., the US federal capital in which the White House, the official residence and principal workplace of the president, is located. Additionally excluded are trips to Camp David, the country residence of the president, and to the private home of the Obama family in Kenwood, Chicago, Illinois.

== January ==
Country/ U.S. state	Areas visited	Dates	Details	Image
Arizona	Tucson	January 12	President Obama attended the memorial service for the victims of the Tucson shooting. He made his first stop at University Medical Center, where he saw Congresswoman Gabby Giffords, who was critically injured in the attack. He then visited four other wounded patients, before meeting the families of those killed in the attack. At the memorial service itself at the University of Arizona sports arena, President Obama made a widely praised speech calling for a more civil political environment.	
New York	Albany, Schenectady	January 21	President Obama arrived at Albany International Airport before visiting a General Electric facility in Schenectady, New York, where he made a speech to around 400 workers concerning economic recovery. Among those who accompanied Obama was Senator Kirsten Gillibrand.	
Wisconsin	Manitowoc	January 26	A day after his State of the Union address, President Obama visited the headquarters of power technology company Orion Energy Systems, Inc. in Manitowoc, Wisconsin. In a speech, Obama called for the U.S. to "up [its] game" in a time of increasing global competition. The decision to make Wisconsin the first state Obama visited following his State of the Union address was seen as making political sense, given the upcoming 2012 presidential election and the state's central position in the "Midwest battleground".	

== February ==
Country/ U.S. state	Areas visited	Dates	Details	Image
California	Woodside	February 17	President Obama visited the home of Silicon Valley venture capitalist John Doerr, a campaign donor. He met with the Silicon Valley CEOs, including Steve Jobs, Mark Zuckerberg, Eric Schmidt, Larry Ellison, and Dick Costolo, and discussed economic issues.	
Oregon	Hillsboro	February 18	President Obama visited the Intel campus in Hillsboro. He toured a semiconductor facility and hosted a forum with CEO Paul Otellini.	
Ohio	Cleveland	February 22	President Obama visited Cleveland State University with members of his cabinet to host a forum on small business as the first part of his "Winning the Future" tour. Steve Case was also in attendance.	
Maryland	Bethesda	February 23	President Obama traveled to Bethesda, Maryland to visit wounded soldiers at the Walter Reed naval hospital. He awarded six Purple Hearts.	

== March ==
Country/ U.S. state	Areas visited	Dates	Details	Image
Virginia	Arlington	March 14	President Obama visited Kenmore Middle School to talk about education. Afterwards he went with Biden to Arlington National Cemetery to honor Frank Buckles who was the last living veteran of World War I.	
Brazil	Brasília, Rio de Janeiro	March 19–21	President Obama arrived in Brasila on March 19. He met with Brazil's president Dilma Rousseff for the first time at the Palácio do Planalto. Obama aimed to bolster the trade relationship between the United States and Brazil. On March 20, he traveled to Rio de Janeiro and spoke to a crowd at the Theatro Municipal. He visited the favela Cidade de Deus, one of Rio de Janeiro's most impoverished and famous neighborhoods. He then went with his family to visit the Christ the Redeemer statue. During his trip to Brazil, Obama made two public speeches in which he spoke about "colonialism, human freedom and the American Dream."	
Chile	Santiago	March 21–22	Obama met with Chile's president Sebastián Piñera at La Moneda Palace to discuss strengthening trade relations. Later, Obama spoke about how the democracies of Latin America could be a guide for the democracies developing in the Middle East in a speech at an art museum in the capital city.	
El Salvador	San Salvador	March 22–23	President Obama met with El Salvador's president Mauricio Funes. The two discussed immigration and drug trafficking. Later he visited the San Salvador Cathedral and the tomb of archbishop Óscar Romero.	
New York	New York City	March 28	President Obama visited United States Mission to the United Nations to dedicate a building in honor of Ronald Brown. Afterwards, he attended a DNC fundraiser in Harlem.	

== April ==
Country/ U.S. state	Areas visited	Dates	Details	Image
Maryland	Landover	April 1	President Obama visited a UPS distribution center to urge companies to switch their fleets to more fuel efficient vehicles. He highlighted the fact that UPS, AT&T, FedEx, PepsiCo and Verizon have signed on to the administration's voluntary program called the National Clean Fleets Partnership. Half a dozen electric vehicles from the companies were on display.	
Pennsylvania	Fairless Hills	April 6	President Obama visited the Gamesa wind turbine plant. He talked about the need to avoid a government shutdown and promoted his administration's goal to reduce U.S. oil imports by one-third by 2025 and to get 80 percent of the nation's electricity from clean sources by 2035.	
New York	New York City	April 6	President Obama spoke at an event hosted by Al Sharpton discussing inequality in education. He described education equality as the "civil rights issue of our time".	
Alabama	Tuscaloosa	April 29	President Obama and the First Lady viewed the damage as well as meet with Governor Bentley, state and local officials and families affected by the storms.	
Florida	Cape Canaveral	April 29	President Obama visited Cape Canaveral to watch the space shuttle Endeavour launch.	
Florida	Miami	April 29	President Obama delivered the commencement address at Miami Dade College.	

== May ==
Country/ U.S. state	Areas visited	Dates	Details	Image
Ireland	Dublin, Moneygall	May 23	During his visit to Ireland, Obama met Irish President Mary McAleese in Dublin, and held talks with Taoiseach Enda Kenny. He also visited Moneygall, home of his great-great-great-grandfather, Falmouth Kearney, who emigrated from Ireland to the U.S. in 1850. After returning from Moneygall to Dublin, Obama made a speech at College Green to reaffirm U.S.-Irish ties.	
United Kingdom	London	May 23–26	President Obama arrived a day ahead of schedule on Monday 23 to avoid any disruption from a volcanic ash cloud in Iceland. During the first official day of his UK state visit, Obama received a ceremonial welcome, including a 41-gun salute, at the Garden at Buckingham Palace. Obama toured the palace and met senior royals there before traveling to 10 Downing Street, where he met Prime Minister David Cameron and his wife Samantha. The president also met opposition leader Ed Miliband and visited to the Globe Academy in Southwark, south London, where Obama and Cameron teamed up for a table tennis match against schoolboys. Obama also laid a wreath on the Tomb of the Unknown Warrior in Westminster Abbey and attended a state banquet at Buckingham Palace hosted by Queen Elizabeth II. On the second day of the state visit, Obama met with Prime Minister Cameron and Deputy Prime Minister Nick Clegg and served up food at a barbecue for military families from the U.S. and Britain in the Downing Street garden. Cameron and Obama hold later a joint press conference at Lancaster House. Obama gave a speech at Westminster Hall to the UK Parliament and later hosted a banquet for the Queen, Prince Philip and a select group of other guests at Winfield House (the U.S. ambassador's residence) in London. Obama departed London on May 26 en route to the G8 Summit in Deauville, France.	
France	Deauville	May 26–27	Obama attended the 37th G8 summit in Deauville where he had bilateral talks with the President of Russia, Dmitry Medvedev, the Prime Minister of Japan, Naoto Kan, and the President of France, Nicolas Sarkozy.	
Poland	Warsaw	May 27–28	On Day One of his two-day visit Obama participated in wreath laying ceremonies at both the Tomb of the Unknown Soldier and the Warsaw Ghetto Memorial. The President also met with Jewish community leaders and Holocaust survivors at the Warsaw Ghetto Memorial. At the evening of Day One he also participated a dinner with Central and Eastern European leaders hosted by Polish President Bronislaw Komorowski at the Royal Castle. On Day Two of his visit Obama had meetings with President Bronisław Komorowski and Prime Minister Donald Tusk. He also visited the memorial to the victims of the Smolensk plane crash at the Field Cathedral of the Polish Military in Warsaw.	
Missouri	Joplin	May 29	Obama visited the town of Joplin, the scene of the devastating 2011 Joplin tornado seven days earlier, and delivered remarks at a memorial service at Missouri Southern University.	
Virginia	Arlington	May 30	President Obama participated in Memorial Day ceremonies at Arlington National Cemetery.	

== June ==
Country/ U.S. state	Areas visited	Dates	Details	Image
Ohio	Toledo	June 3	President Obama visited Chrysler Group Toledo Supplier Park and addressed workers there.	
Virginia	Alexandria	June 8	President Obama traveled to the Northern Virginia Community College, Alexandria Campus, where he delivered a speech about America's manufacturing economy and jobs.	
North Carolina	Durham	June 13	President Obama traveled to Durham, North Carolina, where he toured a manufacturing facility of Cree Inc. that produces efficient LED lighting.	
Florida	Miami	June 13–14	President Obama traveled to Miami, Florida, where he delivered remarks at two Democratic National Committee events, one at a private residence in Coconut Grove, and a second at the Adrienne Arsht Center for the Performing Arts.	
Puerto Rico	San Juan	June 14	President Obama traveled to San Juan, Puerto Rico, where he visited Governor Luis Fortuño at La Fortaleza. The President also dined at Kasalta restaurant with Sen. Alejandro Garcia Padilla and attended a fundraiser for the Democratic National Committee at the historic Caribe Hilton Hotel before returning to Washington in the evening.	
New York	Fort Drum, New York City	June 23	President Obama traveled to the U.S. Army's post at Fort Drum in Jefferson County, New York, where he discussed the situation in Afghanistan with soldiers. The President later traveled to New York City, where he spoke at an LGBT conference and attended Democratic National Committee events at the restaurant of Daniel Boulud and at The Broadway Theatre.	
Pennsylvania	Pittsburgh	June 23–24	President Obama traveled to Pittsburgh, Pennsylvania, where he stayed the night in a Downtown hotel before visiting Carnegie Mellon University's National Robotics Engineering Center in the city's Lawrenceville neighborhood, and giving a speech on the importance of technological competitiveness in U.S. manufacturing.	
Iowa	Bettendorf	June 28	President Obama traveled to Bettendorf, Iowa, where he visited Ross' Restaurant, toured the Alcoa Davenport Works, and discussed the importance of manufacturing to the American economy.	
Virginia	Arlington County	June 30	President Obama traveled to The Pentagon in Arlington County, Virginia, to present outgoing Secretary of Defense Robert Gates with the Medal of Freedom.	
Pennsylvania	Philadelphia	June 30	President Obama traveled to a fundraiser event at The Bellevue-Stratford Hotel in Philadelphia, Pennsylvania, and made an impromptu stop at an Italian ice store in South Philadelphia.	

== August ==
Country/ U.S. state	Areas visited	Dates	Details	Image
Illinois	Chicago	August 3	President Obama attended a fundraiser for his 50th birthday at the Aragon Ballroom in Chicago, Illinois.	
Michigan	Holland	August 11	President Obama traveled to a Johnson Controls battery plant in Holland, Michigan, where he promoted job growth through sustainable energy development.	
New York	New York City	August 11	President Obama attended two Democratic National Committee fundraisers in New York City, at the Ritz-Carlton and at a private dinner hosted by Harvey Weinstein and Anna Wintour.	
Minnesota	Cannon Falls, Zumbrota, Chatfield	August 15	President Obama traveled to Cannon Falls, Minnesota, where he held a town hall-style discussion at Hannah's Bend Park. The President later made a quick stop in Zumbrota, and at summer camp in Chatfield.	
Iowa	Decorah, Guttenberg, Peosta, Maquoketa, DeWitt, Le Claire	August 15–16	President Obama traveled to Decorah, Iowa, where he discussed his economic message at the Seed Savers Exchange Heritage Farm. The President later traveled across Iowa, discussing his message at the Northeast Iowa Community College in Peosta, while also visiting a café in Guttenberg, a high school in Maquoketa, an ice cream store in DeWitt and an antiques gift shop in Le Claire.	

== September ==
Country/ U.S. state	Areas visited	Dates	Details	Image
New York City	New York City	September 11	President Obama attended a memorial ceremony at the World Trade Center Memorial in New York City, where he spoke on the tenth anniversary of the September 11 attacks. He was joined by former U.S. President George W. Bush.	
Pennsylvania	Pittsburgh, Stonycreek Township	September 11	President Obama flies to Pittsburgh International Airport before arriving at the Flight 93 National Memorial.	
California	Silicon Valley, Los Angeles	September 25–26	President Obama attended a fundraiser at the home of Facebook CEO Sheryl Sandberg in Silicon Valley. On September 26, he had lunch in San Diego, then attended two fundraisers that night, one at the House Of Blues in West Hollywood and another at Fig & Olive in Melrose Place.	

== November ==
Country/ U.S. state	Areas visited	Dates	Details	Image
France	Cannes	November 3–4	President Obama attended the G-20 summit meeting in Cannes where he had bilateral talks with French President Nicolas Sarkozy, German Chancellor Angela Merkel and President Cristina Fernández de Kirchner of Argentina. During his stay in France Obama meet with L20 International Labor Leaders, joined President Nicolas Sarkozy in an event honoring the alliance between the United States and France and participated with Sarkozy in a joint interview with French television stations TF1 and France 2.	
Virginia	Arlington County	November 11	President Obama traveled to the Arlington National Cemetery on Veterans Day, laying a wreath on the Tomb of the Unknowns.	
California	San Diego	November 11	Barack Obama attends the Carrier Classic on the flight deck of the USS Carl Vinson.	
Hawaii	Honolulu	November 12–13	President Obama hosted members of the Asia-Pacific Economic Cooperation (APEC) for the 2011 APEC summit meeting.	
Australia	Canberra, Darwin	November 16–17	The two-day visit was President Obama's first official visit to Australia—previously scheduled trips were canceled due to the passage of the Patient Protection and Affordable Care Act and the Gulf of Mexico oil spill. The aim of the visit was to strengthen the Australian American relations and promoting security in the Pacific. On Wednesday 16, the President met with Australian Prime Minister Julia Gillard, and the two held a joint press conference in which an increase in U.S. military presence in northern Australia was announced. Later on that day President Obama was hosted at a supper at the Australian Parliament Residence. On Thursday 17, the President spoke to the Australian Parliament at Parliament House, meet with parliamentary leaders, toured a major college with Prime Minister Gillard, and then traveled to Darwin to commemorate the 60th anniversary of the ANZUS alliance. In Darwin participated in a wreath laying ceremony with Prime Minister Gillard at USS Peary Memorial and delivered remarks to Australian troops and U.S. Marines. During his stay in Australia Obama also participated in a wreath laying ceremony at the Australian War Memorial, met with Opposition Leader Tony Abbott, and held a U.S. Embassy meet and greet at the U.S. Embassy in Canberra, where he also participated in a tree dedication ceremony.	
Indonesia	Nusa Dua on Bali	November 17–19	President Obama attended the annual ASEAN Summit and the Sixth East Asia Summit on Bali. During his stay in Bali Obama participated in an event to announce a commercial deal with representatives of Boeing and Lion Air, participated in Embassy and U.S. Mission Meet & Greet and hosted bilateral meeting with Prime Minister Singh of India, President Aquino of the Philippines, President Yudhoyono of Indonesia as well as Prime Minister Yingluck of Thailand. The President also announced that U.S. Secretary of State Hillary Clinton plans to visit Myanmar in December 2011 on a trip that could signal a major change in relations between the two countries. On Bali President Obama also had an unscheduled meeting with Chinese Prime Minister Wen Jiabao.	
New Hampshire	Manchester	November 22	President Obama traveled to Manchester, New Hampshire, delivering remarks on the American Jobs Act at Manchester High School Central.	
Pennsylvania	Scranton	November 30	President Obama traveled to Scranton, Pennsylvania, where he pushed for an extension of payroll tax cuts at Scranton High School.	
New York	New York City	November 30	President Obama traveled to New York City to campaign and raise funds, including a fundraiser at the Gotham Bar & Grill.	

== See also ==
- List of international presidential trips made by Barack Obama
- Lists of presidential trips made by Barack Obama
