= Takaud Savings and Pensions =

- Company type: Private company as Bahrain Shareholding Company (BSC)
- Industry: Financial services
- Founded: 2011
- Defunct: c. 2019
- Fate: Unknown
- Headquarters: Manama, Kingdom of Bahrain
- Key people: Samer Subhi Khanachet (Chairman), Mazen Isam Hawwa (Vice Chairman)
- Products: Savings and pensions
- Website: www.takaud.com Archived April 6, 2019, at the Wayback Machine

Takaud Savings and Pensions was a Bahraini specialist savings and pensions provider based in Manama. The company was licensed by the Central Bank of Bahrain (CBB). The company ceased operations around 2019 when its web site was taken down.

== History ==
Takaud Savings and Pensions B.S.C. was launched in 2011 and was considered the MENA region's specialist provider of savings and pensions. It provideed businesses as well as nationals and expatriates with investment and savings expertise that is specifically tailored for the GCC and wider Middle Eastern markets. Takaud offered investment through fund managers including BlackRock, JP Morgan, BNP, Dexia, Robeco, Franklin Templeton and Schroders.

== Ownership ==
TAKAUD was 50% owned by Kuwait Projects Company (Holding) K.S.C. (c) (KIPCO) and 50% by United Gulf Bank, a member of the KIPCO Group. The KIPCO Group is one of the biggest holding investment companies in the Middle East and North Africa, with consolidated assets of US$29 billion as at Q3 2013. It was licensed as an Investment Business Firm (Category 1) by the Central Bank of Bahrain (CBB), a closed joint stock company and is incorporated in the Kingdom of Bahrain.
