= Berlin Schönefeld Airport =

Former airport in Berlin, Germany (1934–2020)

Berlin Schönefeld Airport Flughafen Berlin-Schönefeld

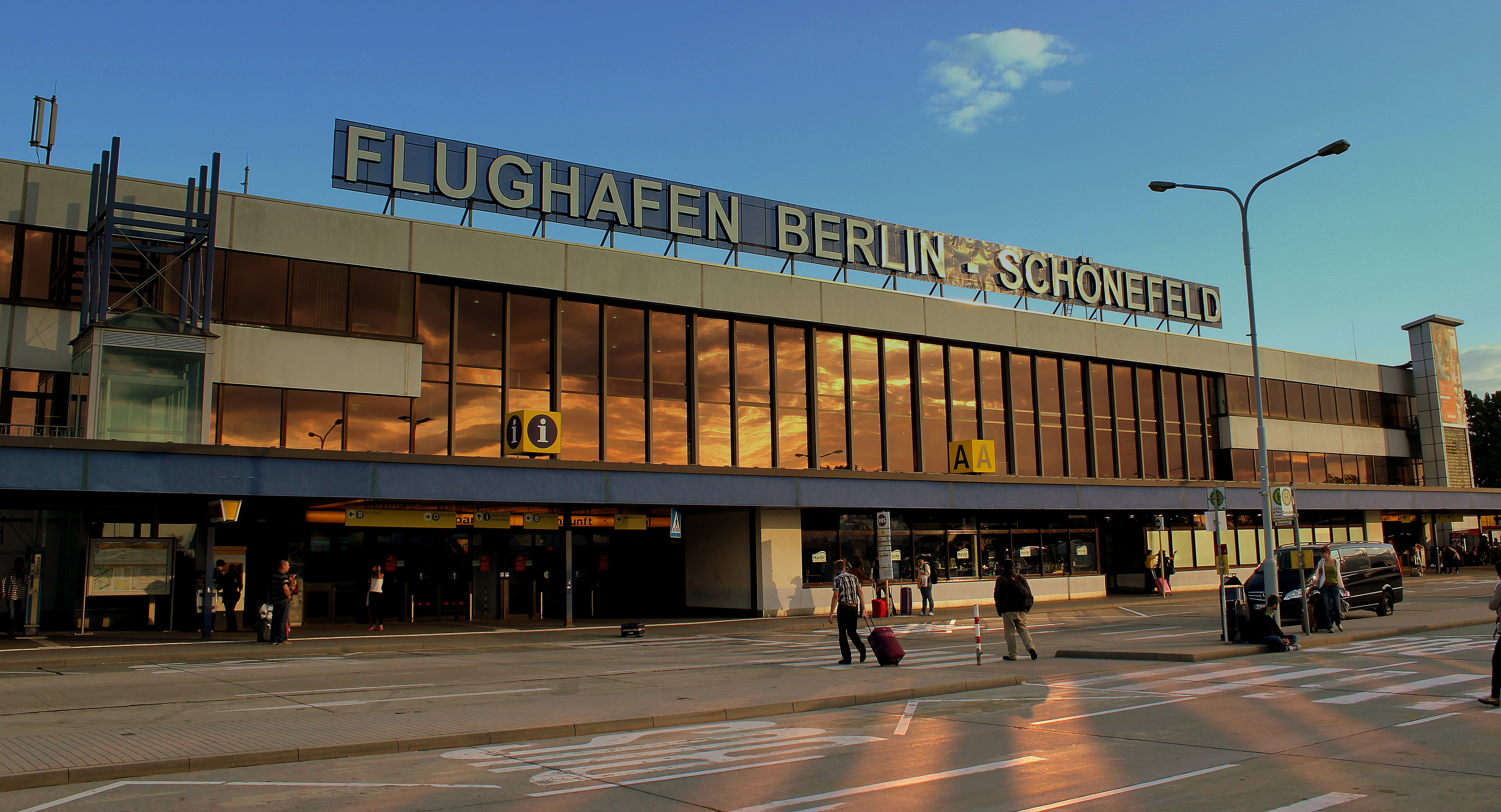
- Terminal A
- IATA: SXF; ICAO: EDDB, ETBS

Summary
- Airport type: Defunct
- Owner/Operator: Flughafen Berlin Brandenburg GmbH
- Serves: East Berlin (1948–1990); Berlin (1934–1948; 1990–2020)
- Location: Schönefeld, Brandenburg
- Opened: 15 October 1934
- Closed: 25 October 2020
- Hub for: Interflug (1963–1991)
- Elevation AMSL: 48 m (157 ft)
- Coordinates: 52°22′43″N 013°31′14″E

Map
- Location relative to Berlin

Runways
Direction	Length		Surface
Direction	m	ft	Surface
07L/25R	3,600	11,811	Asphalt

Statistics (2018)
- Passengers: 12,725,937 ▼1.1%
- Sources: German AIP at EUROCONTROL, airport website

Berlin Schönefeld Airport (German: Flughafen Berlin-Schönefeld; IATA: SXF, ICAO: EDDB, ETBS), name from October 31, 2020 until decommissioning on November 18, 2022 Flughafen BER Terminal 5, was the secondary international airport of Berlin, the capital of Germany. It was located 18 km (11 mi) southeast of Berlin near the town of Schönefeld in the state of Brandenburg and bordered Berlin's southern boundary. It was the smaller of the two airports in Berlin, after Berlin Tegel Airport, and served as an operating base for easyJet and Ryanair. In 2017, the airport handled 12.9 million passengers by serving mainly European metropolitan and leisure destinations. In the same year, the travel portal eDreams ranked Berlin Schönefeld as the worst airport in the world after evaluating 65,000 airport reviews. Schönefeld Airport was the major civil airport of East Germany (GDR) and the only airport of the former East Berlin.

On 25 October 2020 the Schönefeld name and IATA code SXF ceased to exist, marking its closure as an independent airport, with large parts of its infrastructure being incorporated into the new Berlin Brandenburg Airport (IATA: BER, ICAO: EDDB), including the remaining runway and the passenger terminal (as BER's Terminal 5). However by November 2022, the refurbished Terminal 5 had been closed for good without being put in operation.

== History ==
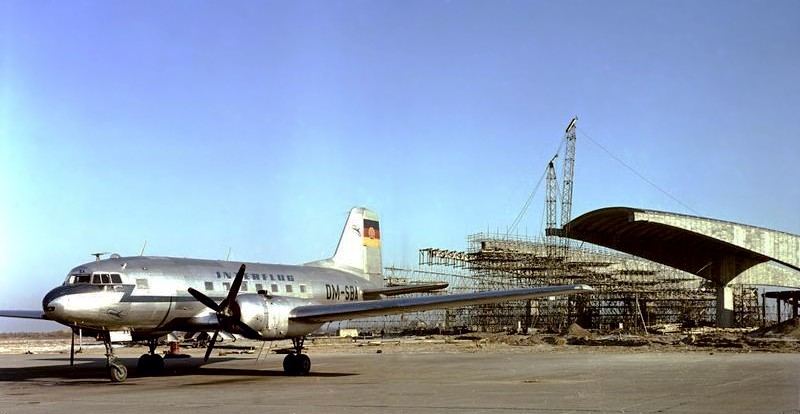
Construction of Interflug's new maintenance hangar in 1961

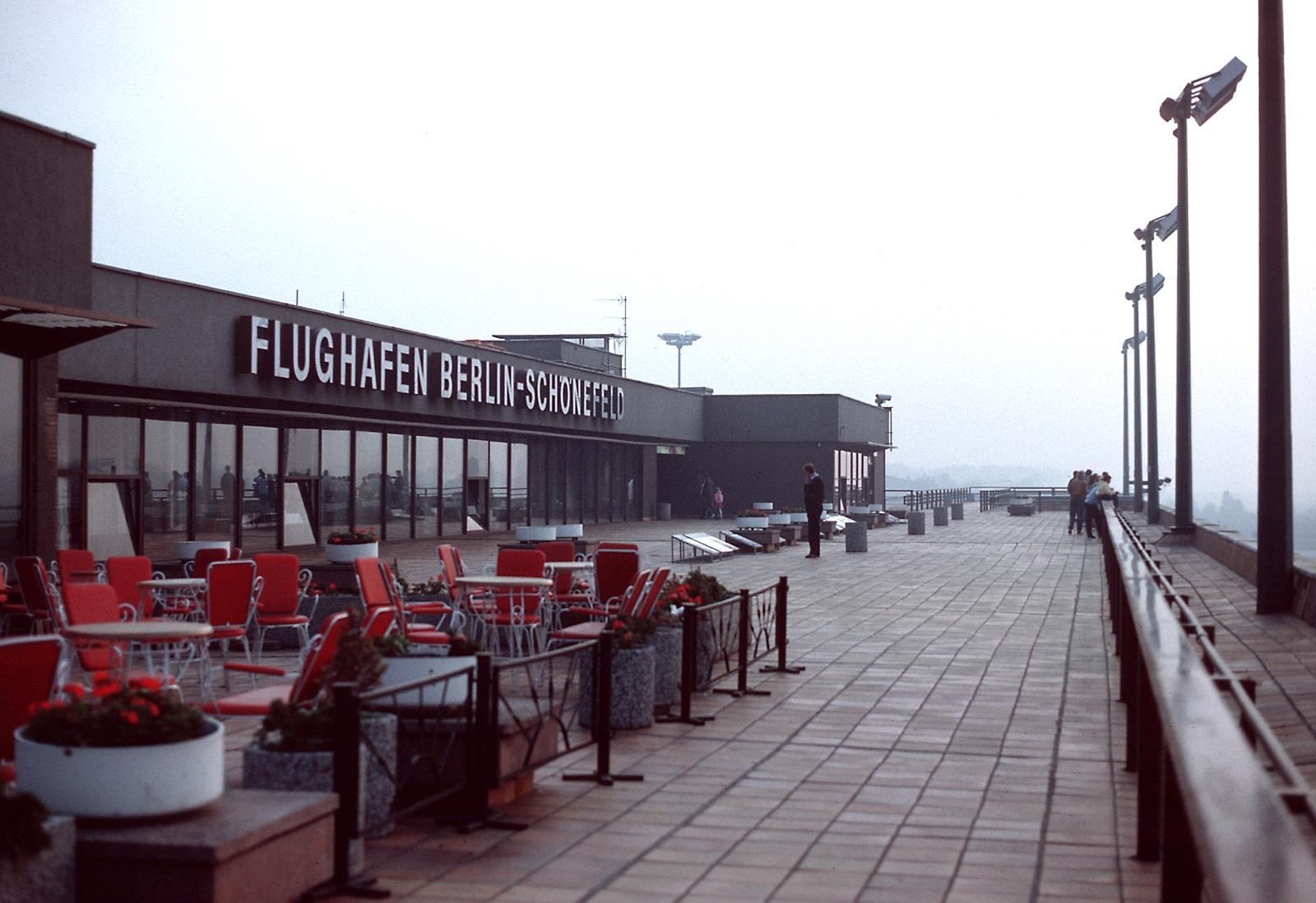
The airport's visitor terrace in 1988, prior to the fall of the Berlin Wall

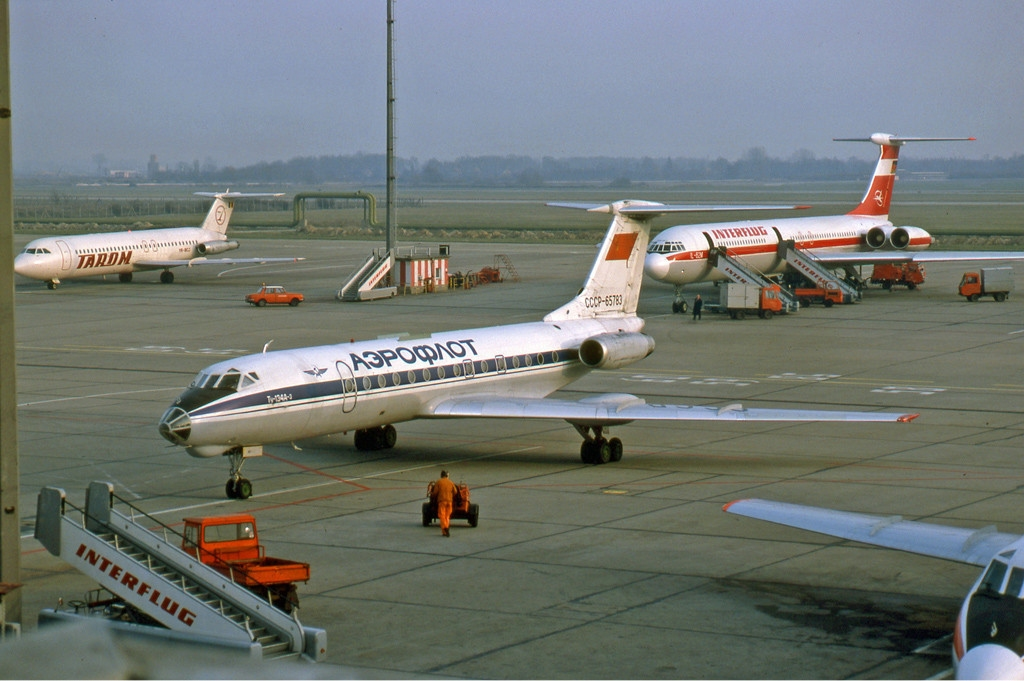
Eastern bloc airlines TAROM, Aeroflot, and Interflug in 1990

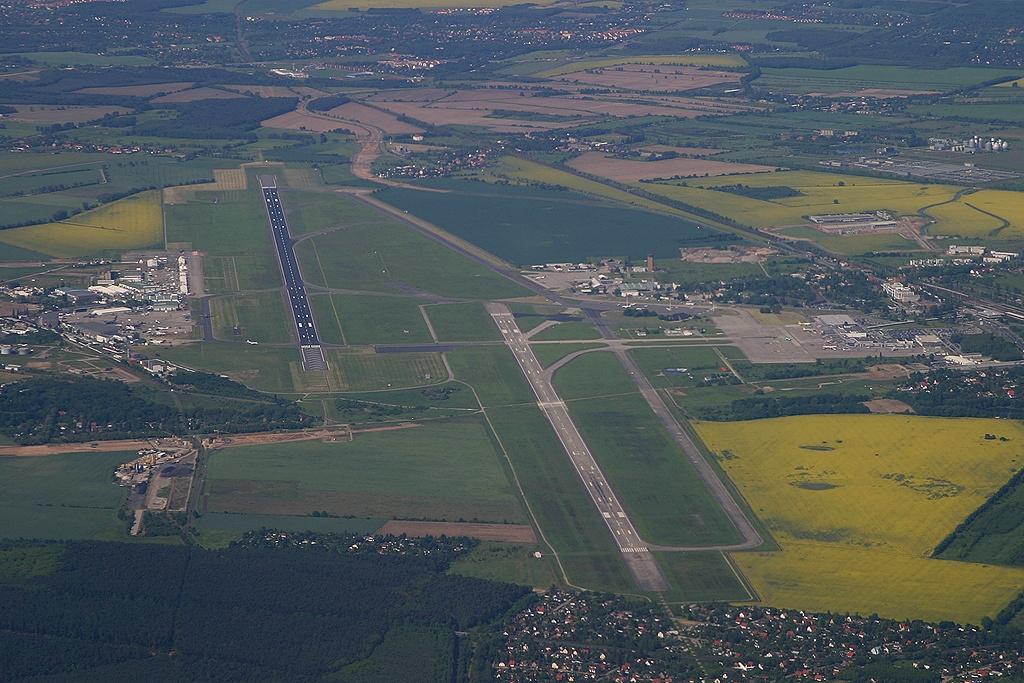
Aerial view before the start of the construction of Berlin Brandenburg Airport. Notice the differing layout compared to the Schönefeld Airport before closure, with a second concrete-surfaced runway near the main asphalt runway, and the logistical facility south of the runway (in what is now BER's Terminal complex).

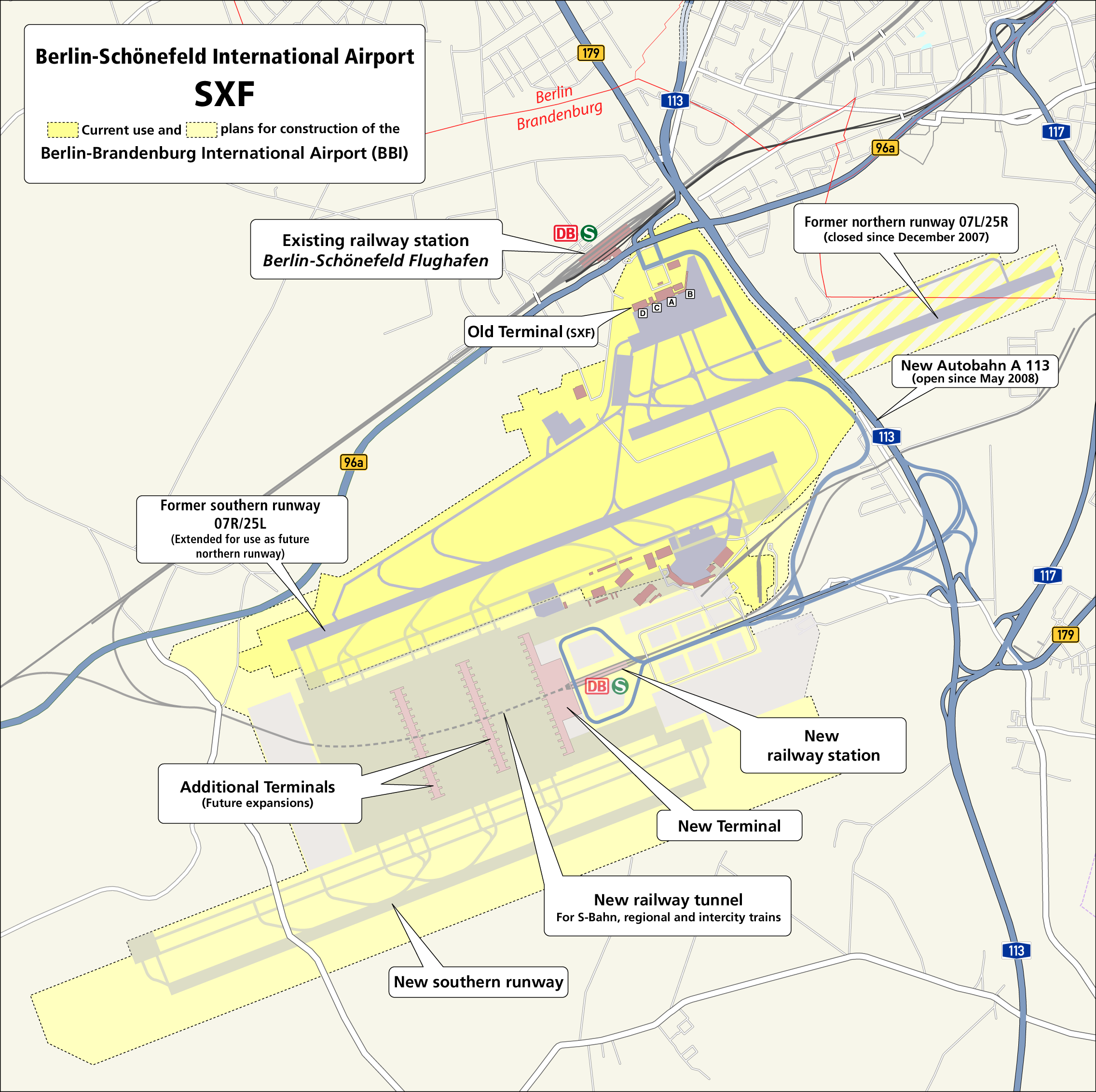
Map showing the infrastructure of the Schönefeld area and the relationship between the new and old airports

=== First years, World War II, and GDR period: 1934–1990 ===
On 15 October 1934, construction began to build three 800 metres (2,600 ft) long runways to serve the Henschel aircraft plant in Schönefeld. By the end of the Second World War, over 14,000 aircraft had been built. On 22 April 1945, the facilities were occupied by Soviet troops, and the plant was dismantled and demolished. By late 1947, the railway connection had been repaired and agricultural machinery was built and repaired on the site.

In 1946, the Soviet Air Forces moved from Johannisthal Air Field to Schönefeld, including the civil airline Aeroflot. In 1947, the Soviet Military Administration in Germany approved the construction of a civilian airport at the site.

A stipulation of the Four Power Agreement following World War II was a total ban on German carriers' participation in air transport to Berlin, where access was restricted to American, British, French, and Soviet airlines. Since Schönefeld airport was located outside the city boundaries of Berlin, this restriction did not apply. Thus, aircraft of the East German flag carrier Interflug could use Schönefeld airport, while West German Lufthansa was denied access to Tegel or Tempelhof airports.

=== Development after German reunification: 1990–2020 ===
Berlin Schönefeld Airport saw a major increase in passenger numbers in later years, which was caused by the opening of bases for both easyJet and Germanwings. In 2008, the airport served 6.6 million passengers.

Following German reunification in 1990, operating three separate airports became increasingly cost-prohibitive, leading the Berlin legislature to pursue plans for a single airport that would be more efficient and would decrease the amount of aircraft noise from airports within the city. Therefore, it was decided to build Berlin Brandenburg Airport at the current site of Schönefeld Airport, originally scheduled to open in late 2012. For various reasons, mainly issues with the fire alarm/safety system, the opening was postponed to November 2020.

At the start of the winter season in 2012 Germanwings left Schönefeld for Berlin-Tegel to maintain closer operations within the Lufthansa Group there. However, to provide competition for Ryanair's new routes, Germanwings announced a return to Schönefeld in addition to their Tegel operations from October 2015.

Aer Lingus also announced it would switch airports within Berlin, from Schönefeld to Tegel, by March 2015. Meanwhile, Ryanair announced the establishment of their sixth German base in Schönefeld by 27 October 2015 by deploying five aircraft to the airport and adding 16 new routes.

On 2 May 2015, aircraft departing from Schönefeld became the first commercial flights to use the southern runway of the new Berlin Brandenburg Airport, which temporarily became Schönefeld's only runway while the original southern runway (and only remaining one of the two original runways), which has become the northern runway of the new airport, was renovated.

Extension work at Schönefeld Airport was completed in 2016. Terminal K was extended by approx. 600 square metres (6,500 sq ft) and the baggage area was also enlarged by 40 per cent. Terminal M2, an entirely new arrival terminal was built west of Terminal M. Spanning almost 3,800 square metres (41,000 sq ft), this building features three baggage carousels and the coach parking area was relocated to a new area in P6.

The airport continued to see exceptionally high growth of passenger numbers with Berlin's economic growth. As of November 2016, the airport operated near full capacity despite several additions to the infrastructure in its final years.

=== Closure ===
As of late 2018, construction works began to upgrade the airport's terminal and apron to provide higher capacity as part of its successor, nearby Berlin Brandenburg Airport. Previously, Schönefeld's facilities were supposed to be demolished to make way for a new government terminal.

On 25 October 2020, Schönefeld Airport became Terminal 5 of Berlin Brandenburg Airport. The IATA code SXF was discontinued on this day. Schönefeld's terminal buildings were intended to be used until the inauguration of a planned Terminal 3 by 2030 with Ryanair as their primary tenant.

However, in November 2020, it was announced that Terminal 5 would be closed due to low passenger numbers in the wake of the COVID-19 pandemic in Germany, with all flights relocating to the main Terminal 1. The terminal was subsequently indefinitely closed on 22 February 2021.

In November 2022, it was announced that Terminal 5, the former Schönefeld Airport, would be permanently closed.

== Facilities ==
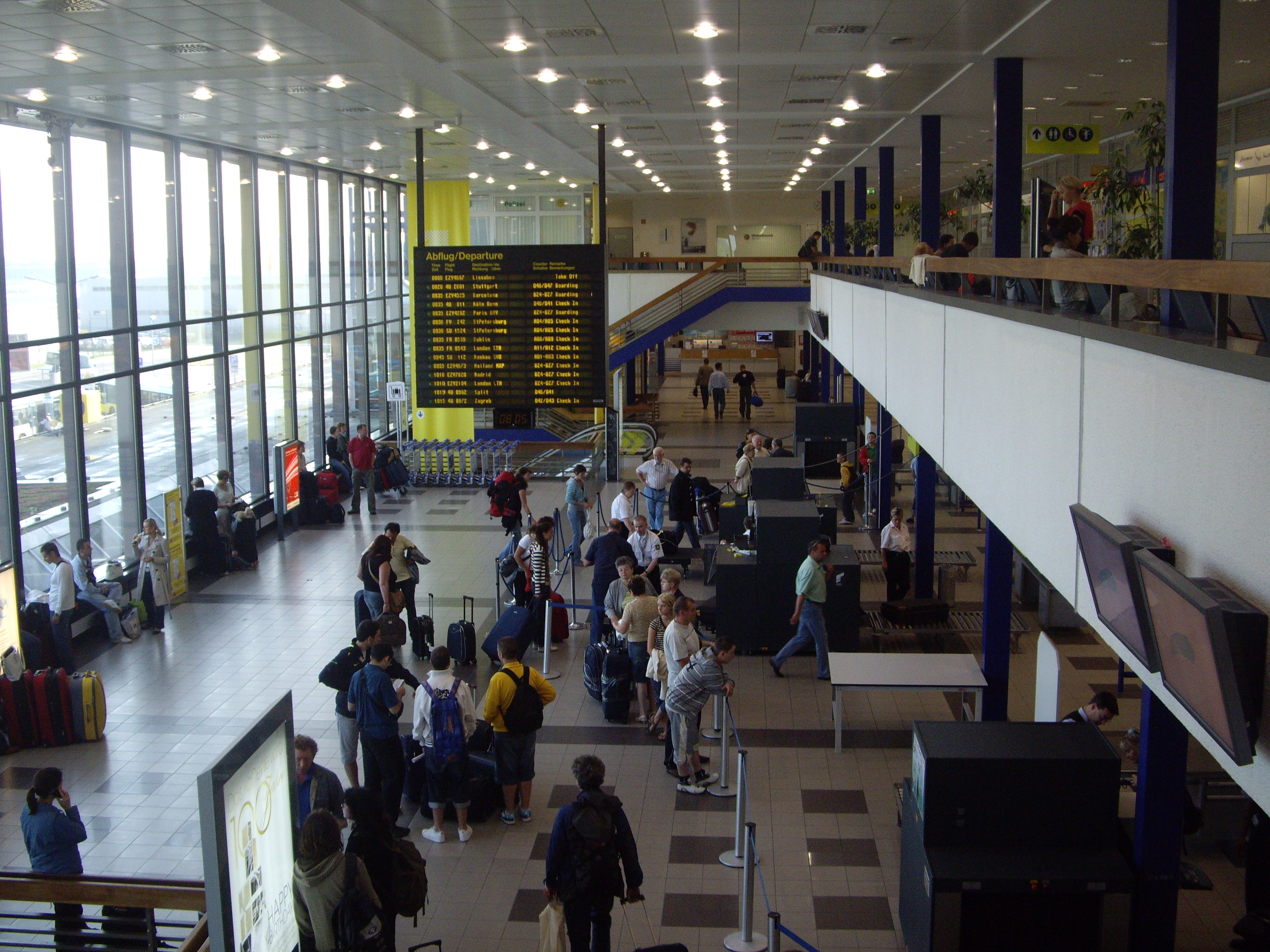
Terminal B main hall

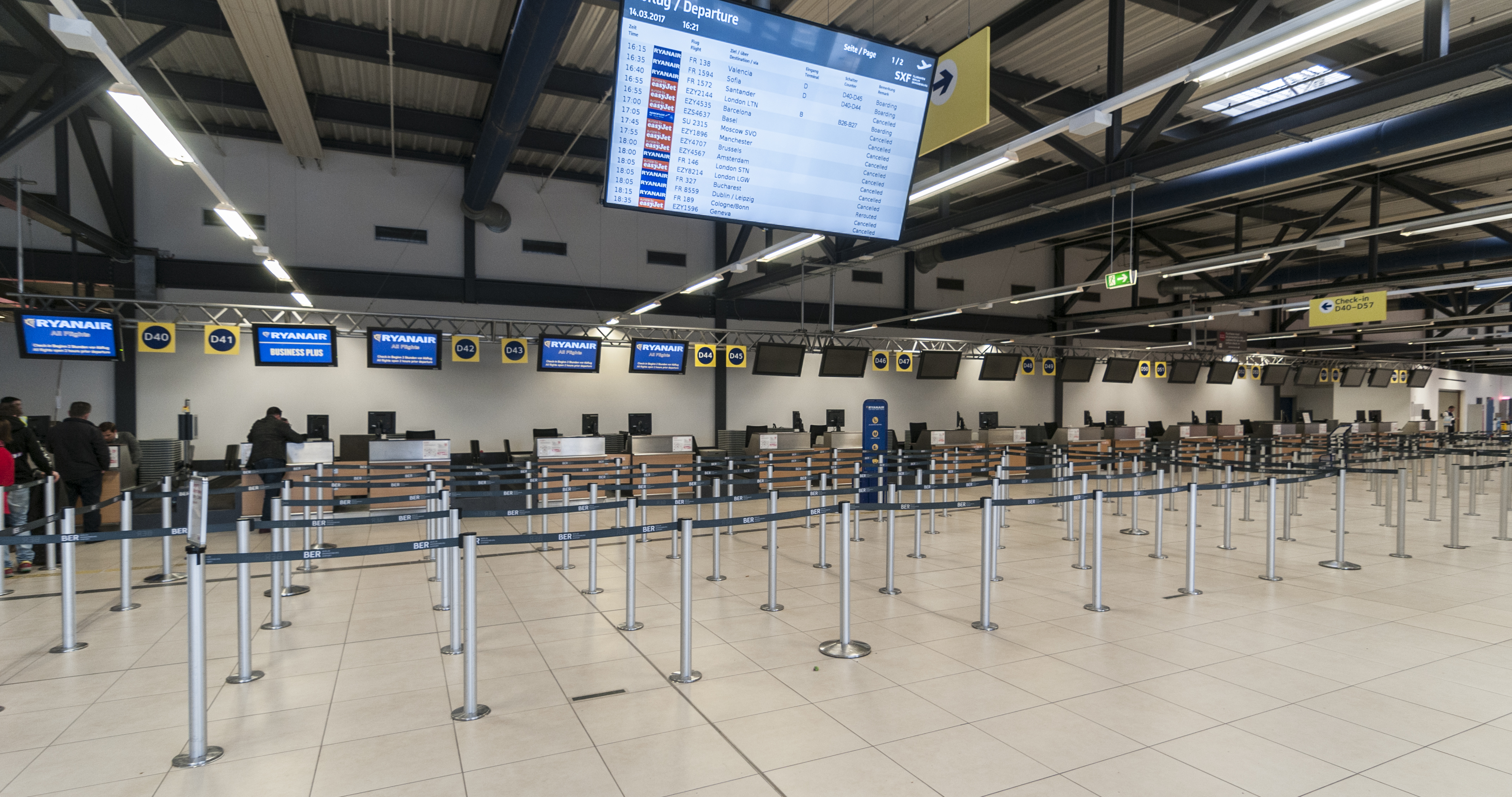
Terminal D check-in area

Schönefeld Airport consisted of the four terminals A, B, C, and D which were renamed to K, L, M, and Q prior to the merger into the new Berlin Brandenburg Airport. These terminals were located next to each other but have separate landside areas. However, they were connected through a joint airside concourse. Terminal Q had no check-in facilities; it was used exclusively for passengers clearing security checks to enter the airside boarding gates. Due to a lack of space, there were not as many facilities as those at many other international airports. There were some shops, however, including duty-free, newsstands, a few fast food restaurants, and a single airline lounge.

=== Terminal A ===
The main building was the original part of the airport. It housed check-in for Terminals K and L. Terminal A featured check-in counters L01–L18, with the largest user being Ryanair alongside several other airlines like Aeroflot.

=== Terminal B ===
Terminal B, located in a side wing, was originally reserved for transit passengers to and from West Berlin who took advantage of cheaper airfares and package tours arranged by an East German travel agency. In later years, it was used exclusively by easyJet with check-in counters K20–K29 and was refurbished. The airside consisted of three jet bridges as well as several walk-boarding aircraft stands located at Pier 3a, an extension that was opened in 2005. Pier 3a was under extensive reconstruction until mid-2019 to allow use as part of the new Berlin Brandenburg Airport.

=== Terminal C ===
Terminal C was originally built in the early 1980s as an external VIP lounge called "Sonderraum" (Special Room), and was tightly secured by the Ministry for State Security (Stasi). Only official guests of the East German government and its subordinated organizations were admitted. Check-in and all mandatory controls were either waived or done invisibly for travelers. After 1990, the Special Room was converted into Terminal C to accommodate highly security-sensitive flights like those of Israeli airlines, but also for charter flights to North America. It was reconfigured in 2008 to handle sightseeing trips and flights in connection with special events. It was further reconfigured in 2015 to provide access to all terminal gates. To reduce congestion in other terminals, it then housed additional security checkpoints for passengers who are checked in and have checked their luggage or only carry hand luggage.

=== Terminal D ===
Terminal D was opened in December 2005 due to rapidly growing passenger numbers. Being nearly identical to Terminal C at Berlin Tegel Airport, it featured check-in counters M40–M57, which were mainly used by Ryanair, Condor, and Norwegian Air Shuttle. It did not feature jet bridges but several walk-boarding stands. In November 2016, the new 4,500-square-metre (48,000 sq ft) large arrivals area D2 opened right next to Terminal D.

=== Other facilities ===
- The head office of Private Wings has been located in the General Aviation Terminal on the property of Schönefeld Airport.
- Before its demise, the East German flag carrier Interflug had its headquarters on the airport property.
- Until Brandenburg Airport started construction c. 2006, 07L/25R was actually known as 07R/25L as Schönefeld had a different 07L/25R. This runway cut across the current Autobahn 113, with the approach lighting to the old runway 25R stretching into Bohnsdorf. This runway was about 8,891 ft (2,710 m) long - some 850 ft (260 m) shorter than the then 07R/25L, and was surfaced with concrete slabs instead of asphalt pavement.

== Former airlines and destinations ==
Prior to its closure as an independent airport, Schönefeld had been served mostly by low-cost and leisure carriers with easyJet, Ryanair, Condor, and Wizz Air offering the most destinations. The airport did not see any long-haul traffic but did serve several dozen routes to European metropolitan and leisure destinations around the Mediterranean. Only a few legacy carriers preferred Schönefeld over Tegel Airport, most notably Aeroflot, El Al and Egypt Air.

== Statistics ==
=== Annual traffic ===
Annual passenger traffic
Year	Passengers	% change
2000	2,209,444	Steady
2001	1,915,110	▼ -13.3%
2002	1,688,028	▼ -11.8%
2003	1,750,921	▲3.7%
2004	3,382,106	▲93.1%
2005	5,075,172	▲50%
2006	6,059,343	▲19.3%
2007	6,331,191	▲4.5%
2008	6,638,162	▲4.8%
2009	6,797,158	▲2.4%
2010	7,297,911	▲7.3%
2011	7,113,989	▼ -2.5%
2012	7,097,274	▼ -0.2%
2013	6,727,306	▼ -5.2%
2014	7,292,517	▲8.4%
2015	8,526,268	▲17%
2016	11,652,922	▲36.6%
2017	12,865,312	▲10.4%
2018	12,725,937	▼ -1.1%
2019	11,417,435	▼ -10.3%

=== Busiest routes ===
Busiest European routes at Schönefeld Airport (2019)
Rank	Destination	All passengers	Operating airlines
1	London-Gatwick	486,222	Easyjet
2	Barcelona	459,363	Easyjet, Ryanair
3	Basel/Mulhouse	438,698	Easyjet
4	London-Stansted	436,444	Ryanair
5	Moscow-Sheremetyevo	409,388	Aeroflot

Busiest intercontinental routes at Schönefeld Airport (2019) (excl. airports in the European part of Turkey)
Rank	Destination	All passengers	Operating airlines
1	Tel Aviv-Ben Gurion	290,622	Astra Airlines, Easyjet, El Al
2	Istanbul-Sabiha Gökcen	153,251	Pegasus Airlines
3	Antalya	128,805	Corendon Airlines, Freebird Airlines, Germania, Pegasus Airlines
4	Hurghada	71,213	Corendon Airlines, Germania
5	Cairo	44,071	EgyptAir

== Ground transportation ==
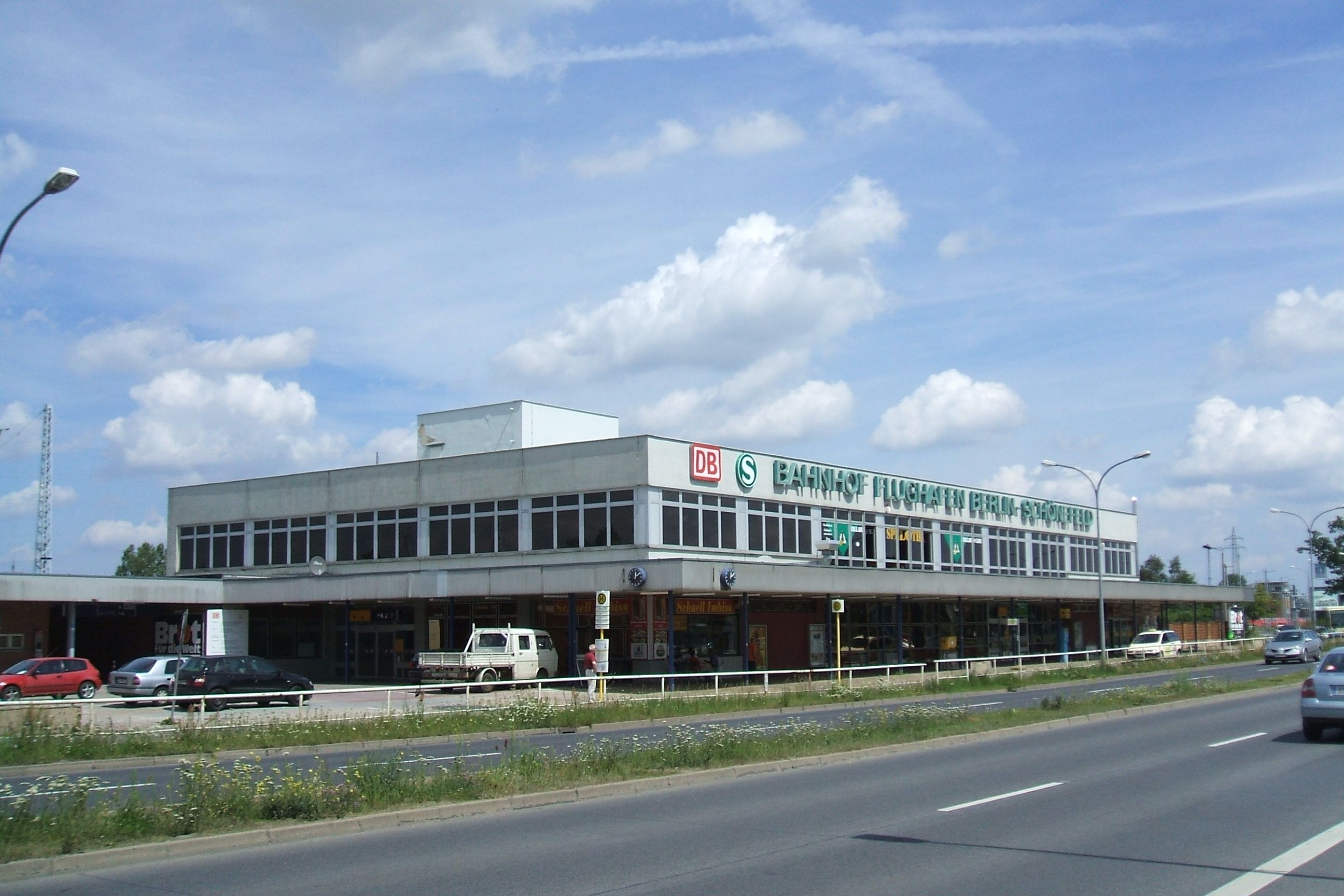
The airport's railway station

=== Train ===
Berlin Schönefeld Airport was served by Berlin-Schönefeld Flughafen railway station, a short walking distance through a ground-level covered walkway from the airport terminals. Berlin Central Station (Berlin Hbf) was served directly by regional trains (RE Regional-Express or RB Regional-Bahn). These ran every 30 minutes and transit through Berlin Ostbahnhof, Alexanderplatz, Friedrichstraße, Berlin Central Station (after 30 minutes), Zoologischer Garten, Charlottenburg, and beyond. Berlin S-Bahn lines S9 and S45 ran every twenty minutes, but only the S9 went through Berlin Central Station.

=== Car ===
The airport could be reached via the nearby motorway A113 (Exit Schönefeld Süd) which itself is connected to motorways A100 which leads to Berlin city center and A10 which circles around Berlin and connects further to all directions.

=== Bus ===
The airport was linked by local BVG bus lines 162 (towards Adlershof) and 171 (towards Neukölln). Additionally the X7 bus service provided a connection to the Berlin U-Bahn network at Rudow Station. At night, the underground replacement bus N7 was available.

== Accidents and incidents ==
- On 14 August 1972, an Ilyushin Il-62 aircraft of Interflug (registered DM-SEA) crashed near Königs Wusterhausen shortly into a flight to Burgas, killing all 156 passengers and crew on board.
- On 22 November 1977, a Tupolev Tu-134 aircraft of Interflug (registration DM-SCM) crashed upon landing at Schönefeld Airport due to a falsely configured autopilot. There were no fatalities among the 74 passengers and crew, but the aircraft was damaged beyond repair.
- On 19 August 1978, LOT Polish Airlines Flight 165, a LOT flight from Gdańsk-Rębiechowo Airport to Schönefeld (carried out on a Tupolev Tu-134, registration SP-LGC), was hijacked and forced to land at Tempelhof Airport in West Berlin, thus having been used as a means for escaping the Eastern Bloc. In these cases, perpetrators were usually not charged by Western authorities.
- On 12 December 1986, Aeroflot Flight 892 an Aeroflot Tupolev Tu-134 (registration CCCP-65795) coming from Minsk Airport crashed in Berlin Bohnsdorf on its approach towards Schönefeld airport, after having attempted to land on a runway that was temporarily blocked for construction work, killing 72 of the 82 passengers and crew on board.
- On 17 June 1989, an Ilyushin Il-62 aircraft of Interflug (registration DDR-SEW) bound for Moscow crashed shortly after take-off into a field near the airport and caught fire. 21 people on board as well as one person on the ground were killed. The East German authorities feared an act of sabotage due to the anniversary of the East German uprising, which led to a delayed aid for injured people. West Berlin rescuers offering help were denied access to the scene. The cause for the accident was later given as a jammed rudder due to a manufacturing defect.
- On 28 March 2000, a Boeing 737-300 of Germania (registration D-AGES) operating a charter flight on behalf of LTU from Tenerife South Airport to Schönefeld was the subject of an attempted hijack in mid-flight. A passenger forced his way into the cockpit, where he attacked the pilot, leading to a sudden loss of altitude. The perpetrator was restrained and the flight continued to Berlin.
- On 19 June 2010, a 1944-built, historic Douglas DC-3 D-CXXX of Berlin Air Services crashed shortly after takeoff on a local sightseeing flight, causing seven injuries but no fatalities.

== See also ==
- Transport in Germany
- Transport in Berlin
- List of airports in Germany
- Berlin Brandenburg Airport
- Airports of Berlin
