= 2011 eruption of Grímsvötn =

Volcanic eruption in Iceland

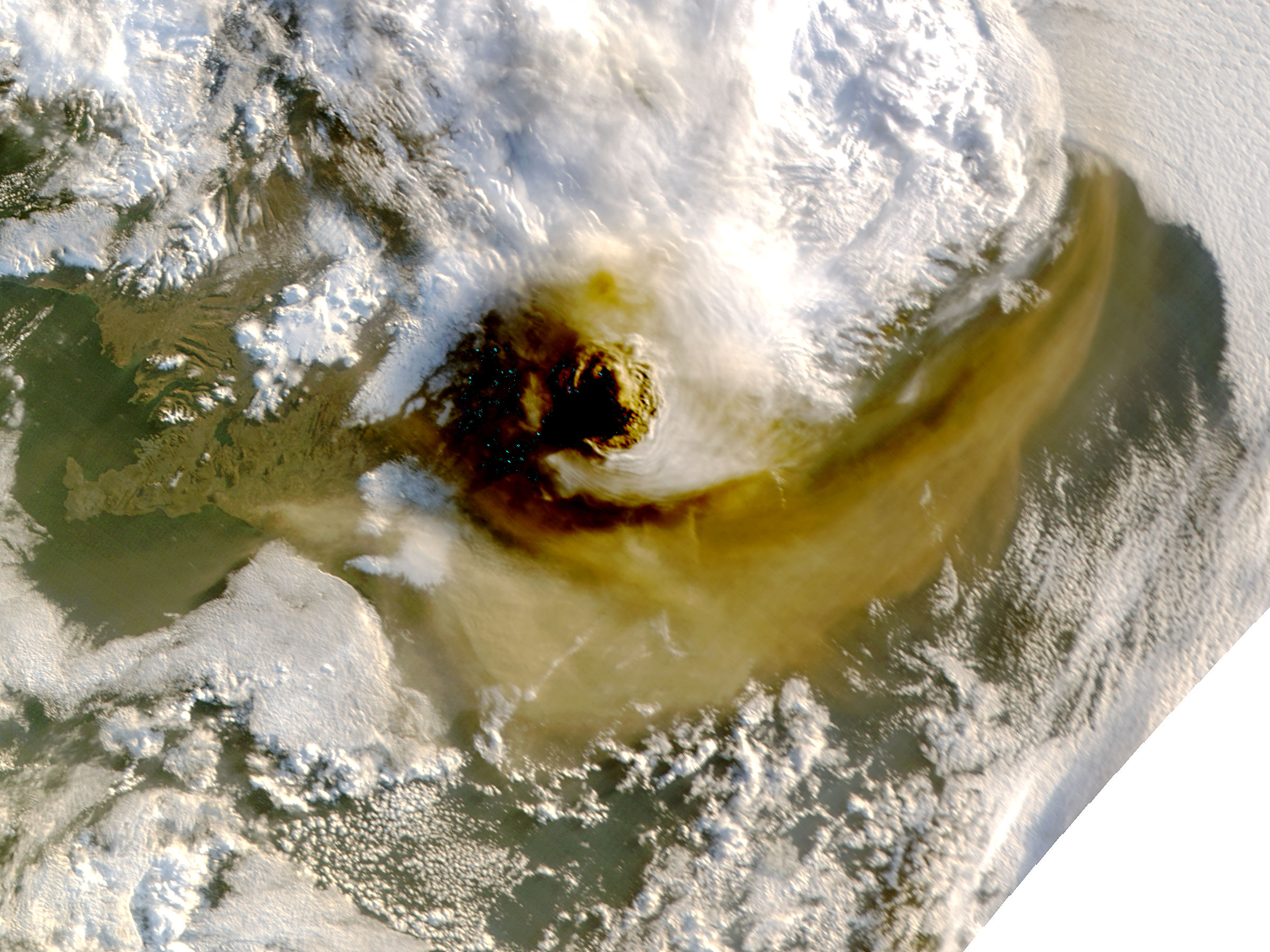
- Grímsvötn on 22 May, showing ash plume
- Volcano: Grímsvötn
- Start date: 21 May 2011
- End date: 28 May 2011
- Type: Plinian eruption
- Location: Grímsvötn, Iceland; 64°25′12″N 17°19′48″W
- VEI: 4
- Impact: Disruption of air travel

Maps
- Grímsvötn and webcam

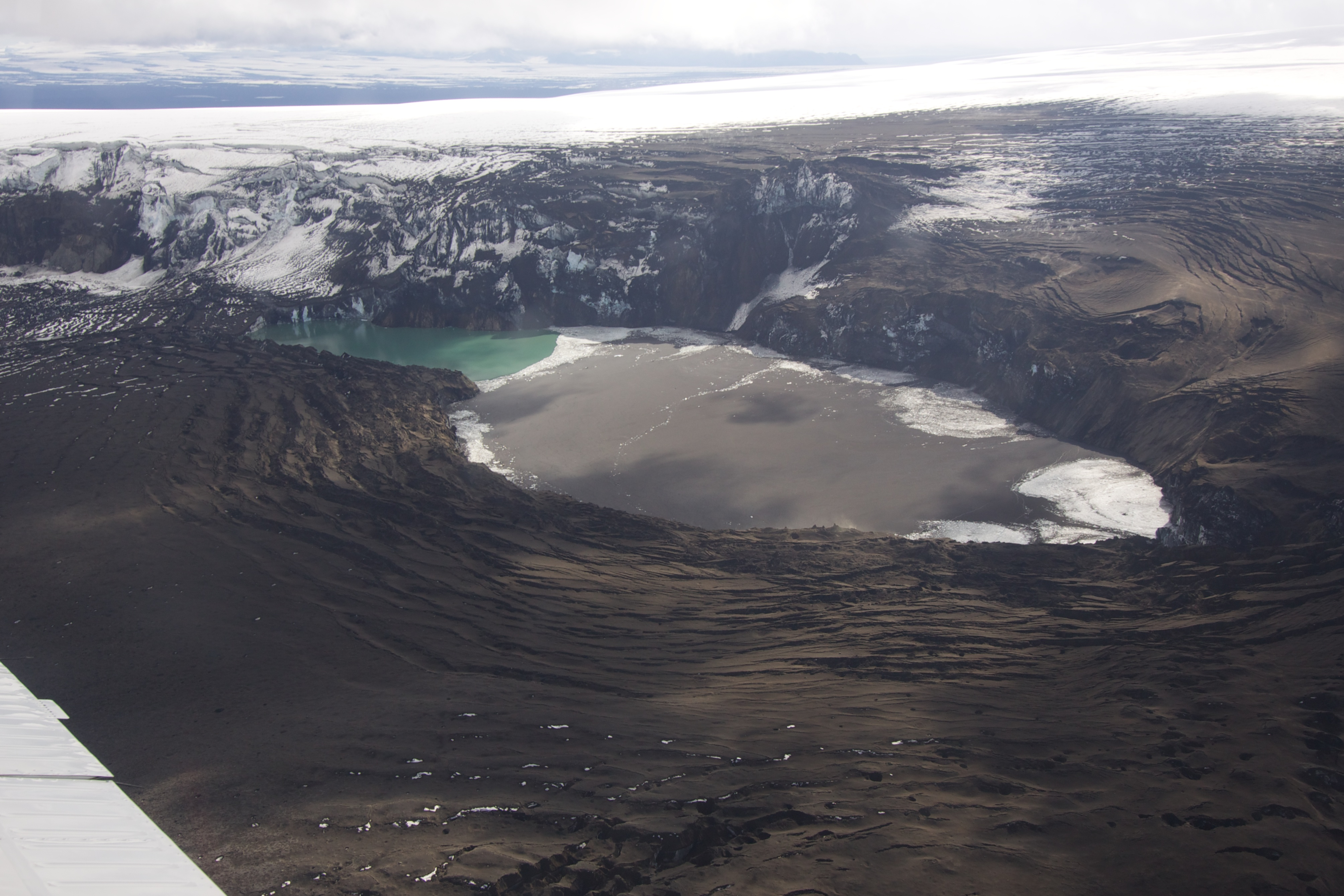
Grímsvötn covered in ash three months after the eruption

The 2011 eruption of Grímsvötn was a Plinian eruption of Grímsvötn, Iceland's most active volcano, which caused disruption to air travel in Northwestern Europe from 22–25 May 2011. The last eruption of Grímsvötn was in 2004, with the previous most powerful eruptions in 1783, 1873 and 1902. The Grímsvötn eruption was the largest eruption in Iceland for 50 years.

== Timeline ==
The eruption is estimated to have started under the glacier at around 17:30 UTC on 21 May 2011 when an intense spike in tremor activity was detected. At around 19:00 UTC, the eruption broke the ice cover of the glacier and started spewing volcanic ash into the air. The eruption plume quickly rose to 65,000 feet (20 km). A series of small earthquakes had commenced at the time of eruption. Glacial flooding was anticipated, which normally occurs within 10–12 hours after eruption, but it never occurred as a flood had occurred the previous autumn, meaning a smaller chance of another flood appearing.

On 25 May, the Icelandic Meteorological Office (IMO) confirmed the eruption had paused at 02:40 UTC. Later the BBC reported that the volcanic activity appeared to have stopped. At 15:00 the IMO issued an update stating that no further ash plume was expected. Pulsating explosions continued to produce ash and steam clouds, some reaching a few kilometers in height, rising up from the vents. There was widespread ash in cloud layers up to 5 km from the eruption site.

On 26 May the IMO and the University of Iceland reported that ashfall was only occurring adjacent to the eruption site. Visual observations indicated that little ice meltwater was produced during the eruption, so that an outburst flood (jökulhlaup) was not expected.

The eruption ceased at 7am on 28 May 2011.

== Ash characteristics ==
The ash content from the Grímsvötn volcano in Iceland had a much lower silica content (50%) compared to the ash from the 2010 eruptions of Eyjafjallajökull (63%), giving the latter a higher viscosity. The ash emitted from Grímsvötn is also more coarse than the smaller, more abrasive particles emitted from the Eyjafjallajökull eruption as a result of the basalt-based magma of the Grímsvötn volcano exploding through the glacier, rather than reacting with meltwater.

== Effect on flights ==
A total of 900 flights (out of 90,000 in Europe) were cancelled as a result of the eruption in the period 23–25 May.

On 22 May, Iceland closed down its main airport Keflavík International Airport, with domestic flights operated from Reykjavík Airport cancelled as well. Transatlantic flights had also experienced delays, and the threat of further air travel disruption cut US President Barack Obama's state visit to Ireland a day short. Part of Greenland's eastern airspace was also closed, with one flight being cancelled by Air Greenland between Denmark's Kastrup Airport and Greenland's Kangerlussuaq Airport.

By 23 May, authorities in Denmark closed airspace below 6.4 km (21,000 ft) in the northwestern part of the country, with some delays and cancellations at Copenhagen.

On 24 May, more than 1,600 flights were grounded as ash clouds travelled over Scotland, with airports in Scotland and northern England closed and 250 UK flights grounded. British Airways, KLM, Aer Lingus, Flybe, BMI, Loganair, Eastern Airways, EasyJet, and Ryanair cancelled most flights in the Scotland region, seeing Wales' Cardiff Airport also cancelling inbound and outbound flights by airline Flybe. Certain flights from Northern Ireland were also grounded. The BBC has provided a list of affected flights to and from Irish airports. By nightfall, 20 flights had been cancelled to and from Göteborg Landvetter Airport, with anticipated wind shift bringing the ash clouds from southwestern Sweden to the northeast, possibly reaching Stockholm's Arlanda Airport by 02:00 on Wednesday morning. Furthermore, Continental Airlines Flights 75 and 97 (from Hamburg and Berlin Tegel to Newark Liberty) had to make stopovers at Gander Airport, Newfoundland, to refuel as they were assigned more southerly routes that exceeded the Boeing 757-200s' range.

On 25 May, Germany also shut down airports in the north of the country, specifically Bremen Airport and Hamburg Airport at 03:00 and 04:00 CET, while Berlin Airports were closed from 09:00 CET. 600 flights were affected in Germany, however the closure was lifted by the afternoon.

By 26 May no European airspace was closed due to Grímsvötn volcanic ash, which was dissipating.

However on 27 May Greenlandic airspace was closed due to a concentration of ash over Greenland and the North Atlantic, affecting 1,000 passengers and 20 tonnes of cargo. The following day, certain flights had been restored with a Dash 8 taken out of service for technical issues, leaving minor disruptions to restored services. Ash clouds also remained over the region of Uummannaq and Upernavik, meaning northern-bound flights were still subject to weather developments. By Sunday 29 May, more flights and services had been restored, with few passengers stuck in coastal regions with arrivals expected on Monday or Tuesday.

== Effect on locals ==
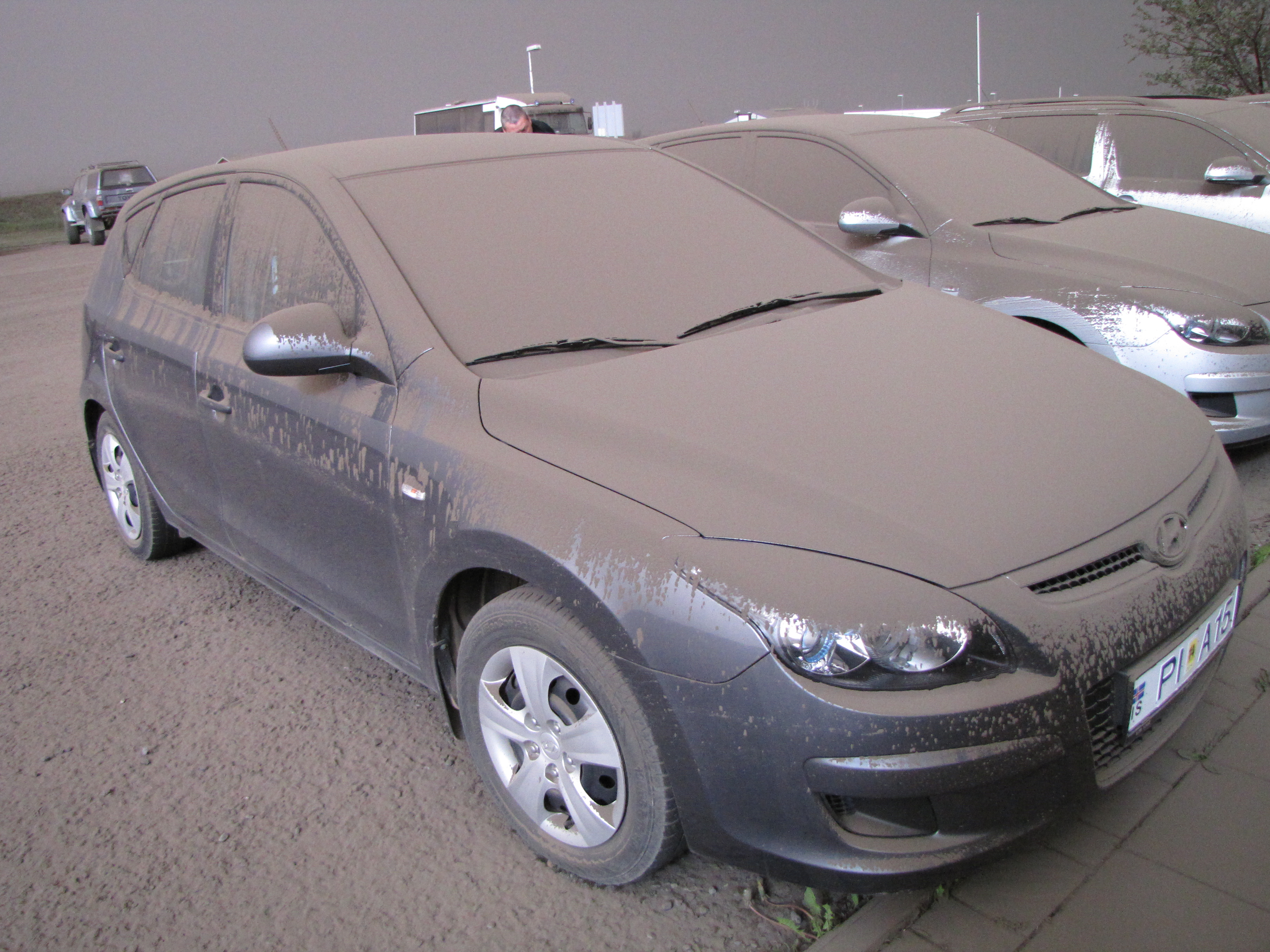
Ash-covered cars at Foss Hotel Skaftafell

Kirkjubaejarklaustur was one of the most affected areas by the volcano. The Icelandic civil defence agency Almannavarnir established a service centre to organise cleanup efforts and provide a point of contact for people who need help. During a local public meeting on the 26th, residents were permitted to claim for losses and additional costs for those who possess household fire insurance.

== Health effects outside of Iceland ==
A study based on mortality data from Sweden found that there was an increase in mortality in the week following the ash cloud passing over Sweden the 24th and 25 May 2011, but the results were not statistically significant.

== Effect on markets ==
Trading on jet fuel recovered as concerns on the volcano eased, causing the June swap contract to gain $18.30 to reach $1,019.14 per tonne by 16:15 GMT, after having reached a week low of $995.64 on Monday. Jet fuel barges on the Amsterdam-Rotterdam-Antwerp hub had dropped to $989 on Monday, dropping from $1,003 per ton on 20 May. June jet fuel cargo swaps dropped to $93.15 per tonne on Tuesday compared to $99.45 on Monday trading.

== See also ==
- Volcanic ash and aviation safety
- Air travel disruption after the 2010 Eyjafjallajökull eruption
