= Airports of Berlin =

Former and current airports located in and around Berlin, the capital of Germany, are as follows:

Map of current and former airports in and near Berlin

== Current airport ==
- Berlin Brandenburg Airport "Willy Brandt" (IATA: BER, ICAO: EDDB), Berlin's current sole international airport, opened in 2020 after nine years of delay. It is located just across the Berlin-Brandenburg border in Schönefeld.

== Former airports ==
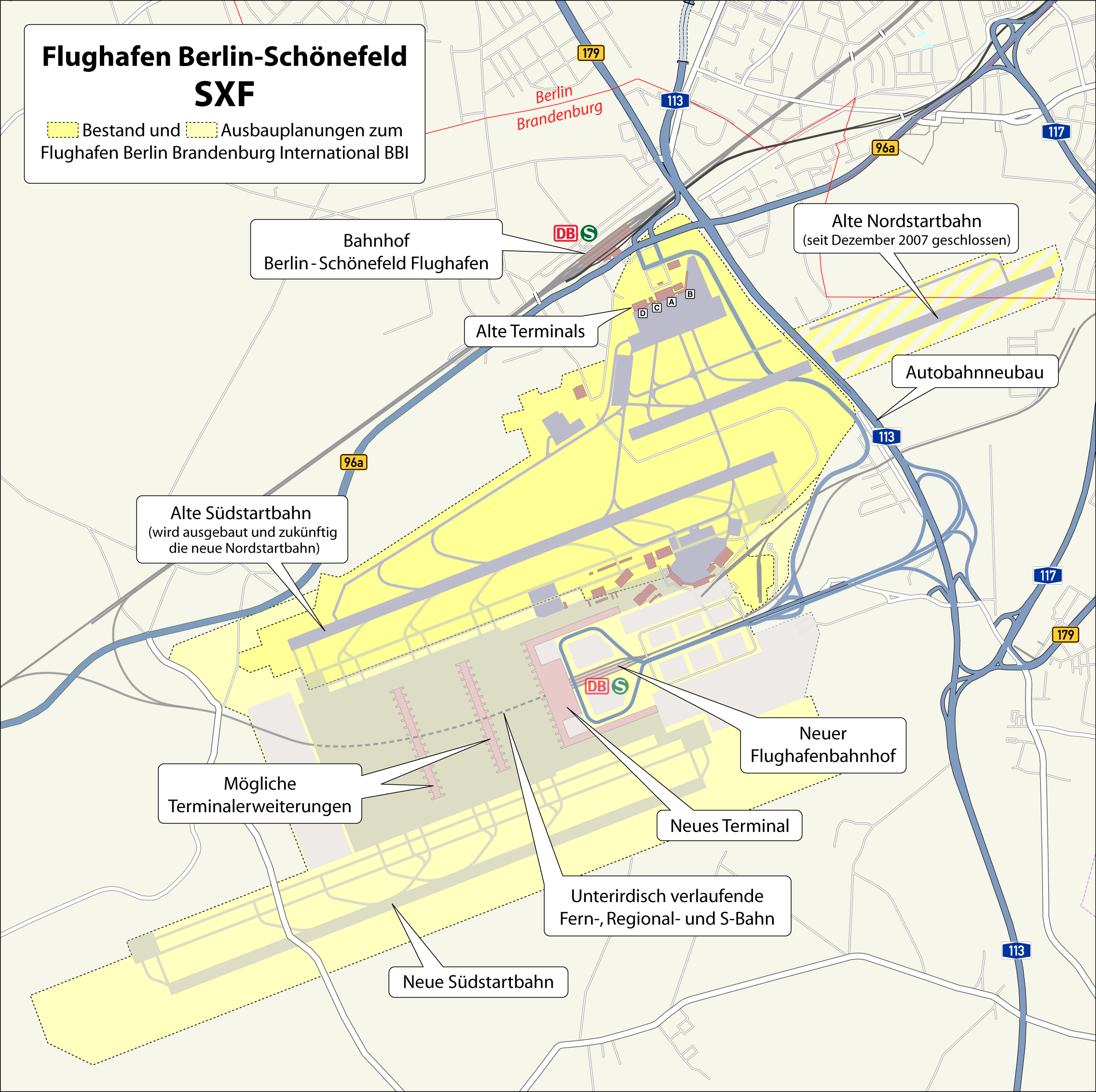
Schönefeld Airport, showing the current and former runways as well as the new Berlin Brandenburg Airport, and city and state boundary

- Berlin Schönefeld Airport (IATA: SXF, ICAO: EDDB), founded in 1934, the airport for East Berlin during the Cold War and closed in 2020, the old terminal and one of the runways became part of Berlin Brandenburg Airport. The former northern runway (shut down in 2007) crossed the city and state boundary, the rest of the airport (including the terminal building) was in Brandenburg.
- Berlin Tegel Airport "Otto Lilienthal" (IATA: TXL, ICAO: EDDT), the former main airport of Berlin (and prior to that West Berlin). It was built during the Berlin Airlift in 1948, was a hub for Air Berlin until its collapse in 2017, and the airport closed in 2020. A heliport in the northern section is still in use.
- Berlin Tempelhof Airport (IATA: THF, ICAO: EDDI), the iconic airport that opened in 1923 and closed in 2008, and is currently used as a racetrack.
- RAF Gatow (IATA: GWW, ICAO: EDBG), the former Royal Air Force military airbase in the district of Gatow in south-western Berlin, closed in 1994. Today an Air Force Museum uses the site.
- Johannisthal Airfield, Germany's second airfield (opened in 1909), located 15 km southeast of Berlin, between Johannisthal and Adlershof de facto closed in 1952 officially closed 1995.
- Staaken Airfield, located at the most western edge half inside and outside the borough of Berlin-Spandau, used for Zeppelins and an early Deutsche Luft Hansa base, closed after the withdrawal of the Soviet air force and turned into a clinic.

== See also ==
- Transport in Berlin
- List of airports in Germany
