= History of Neukölln =

History of the quarter of the Neukölln borough in Berlin, Germany

Neukölln is the northernmost inner-city quarter (Ortsteil) of Neukölln, one of the twelve boroughs of Berlin. The quarter's history begins with its foundation as a Knights Templar stronghold during the Ostsiedlung era in the late 12th to early 13th century. Following its demilitarization and rededication as an agricultural Templar estate around 1245, its ownership was transferred to the Knights Hospitaller in 1318. The estate was legally elevated to the status of village in its foundational charter of 1360, which is the earliest source for its original toponym, Richardsdorf, which was later contracted to Ricksdorf.

In the 15th century, Ricksdorf became a shared treasury village of the Cölln and Alt-Berlin magistracies, a status that lasted for three centuries through the breakup and reunification of Cölln and Berlin. In the 18th century, its official modern name Rixdorf emerged, and the village was expanded with a large colony of Bohemian refugees. In the 19th century, the colony Böhmisch-Rixdorf eventually united with the historical Deutsch-Rixdorf, and the new village grew into the largest town of Prussia, becoming an important industrial center of the region. In 1899, Rixdorf was granted the status of an independent and free city. In 1912, the city was renamed to Neukölln.

With the 1920 Greater Berlin Act, Neukölln merged with the city of Berlin and, together with the former villages and towns of Britz, Buckow and Rudow, formed Neukölln, a large borough of Germany's capital, which stretches all the way from the city center's lower east side to the southern border with Brandenburg. Since the Weimar Republic, Neukölln's fate has been closely intertwined with the history of Berlin. Over its long history, the quarter Neukölln has always been a popular destination for colonists, migrant workers, refugees and immigrants.

== Etymologies ==
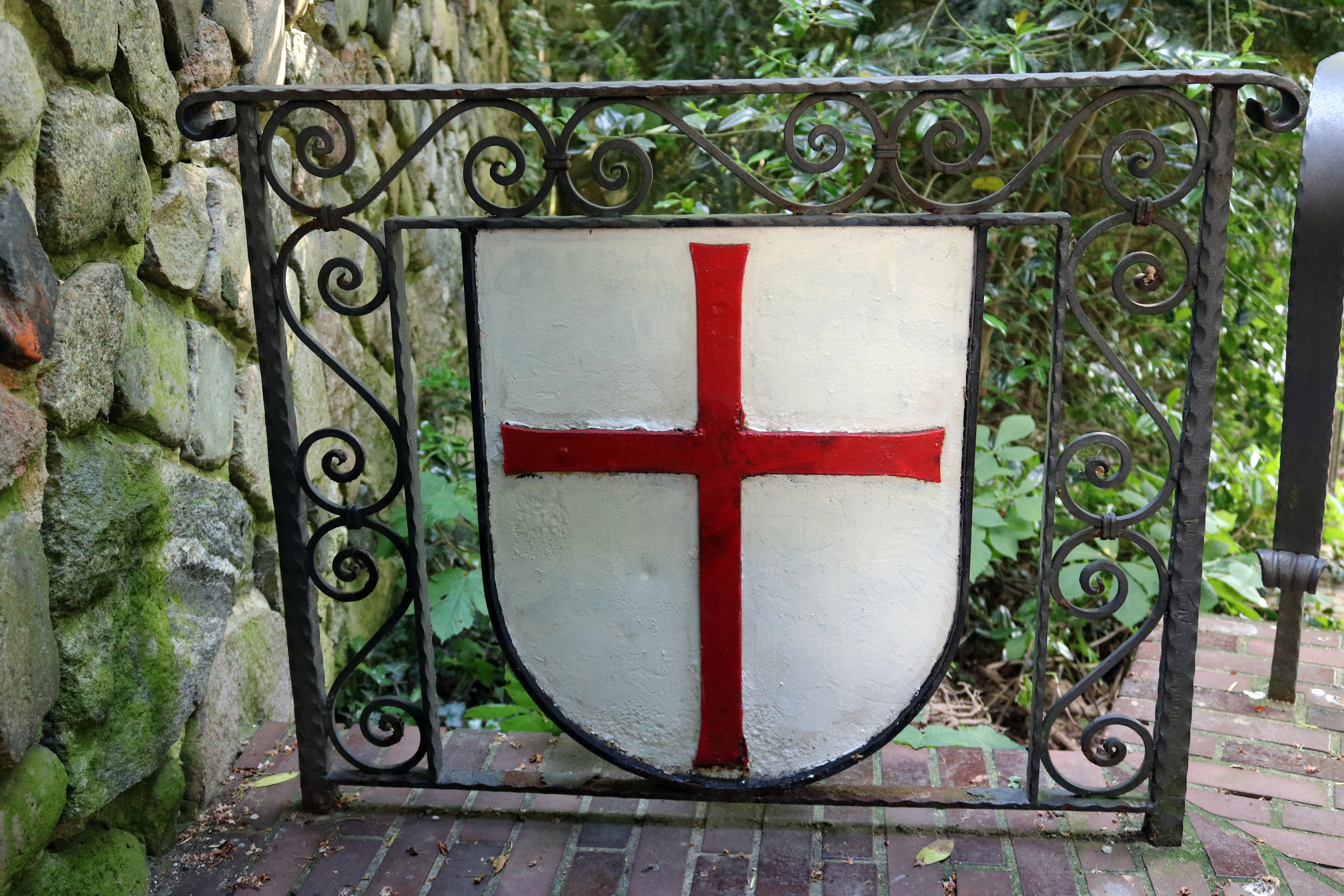
Knights Templar cross, Templar village church, Tempelhof

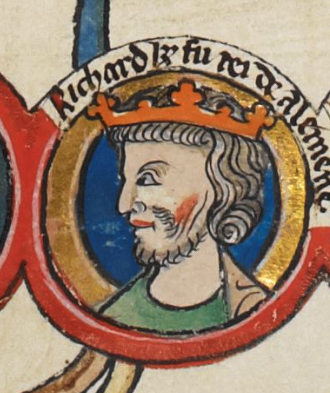
Richard of Cornwall

Richard de Bures, family coat of arms

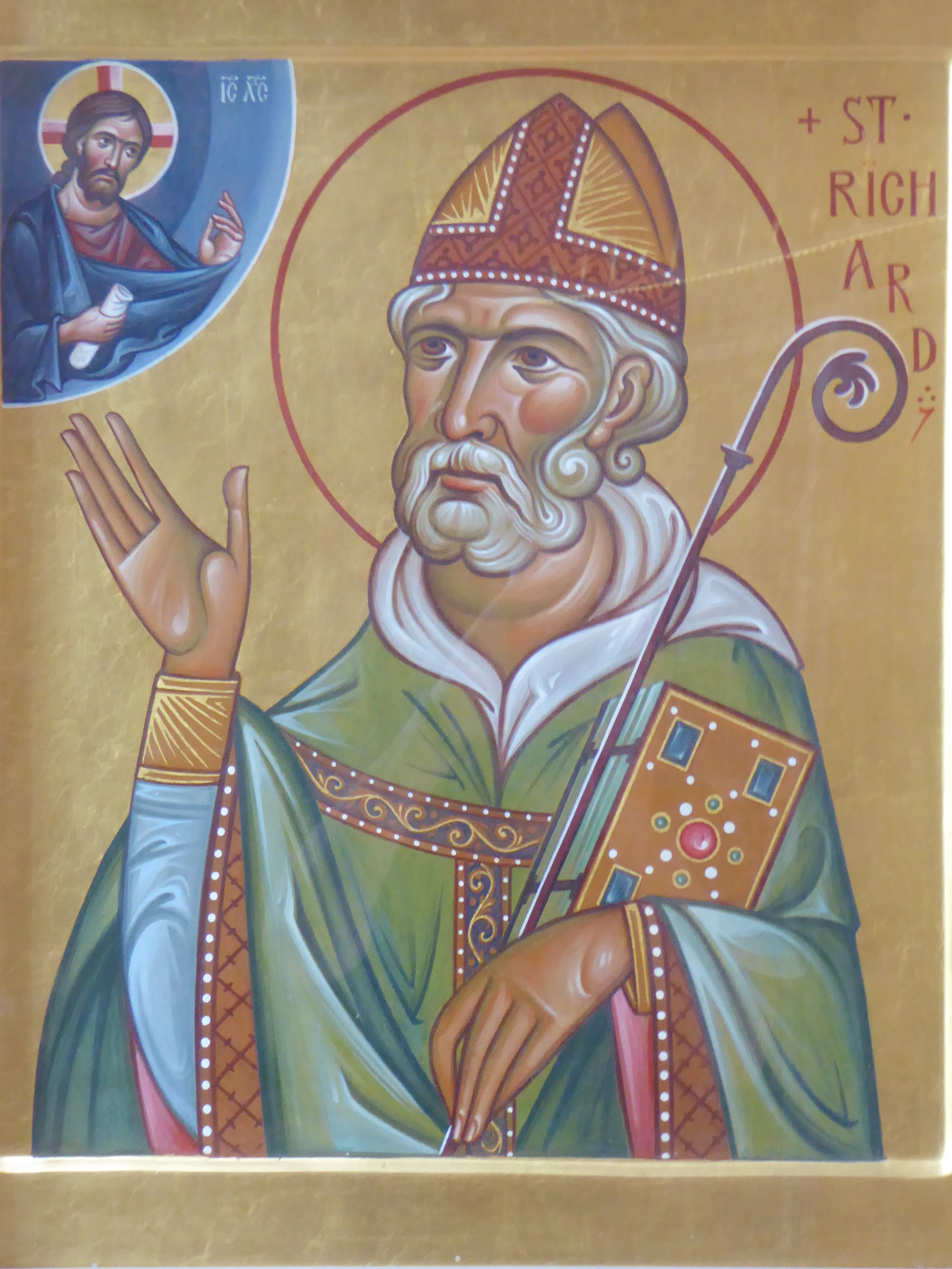
St. Richard of Chichester

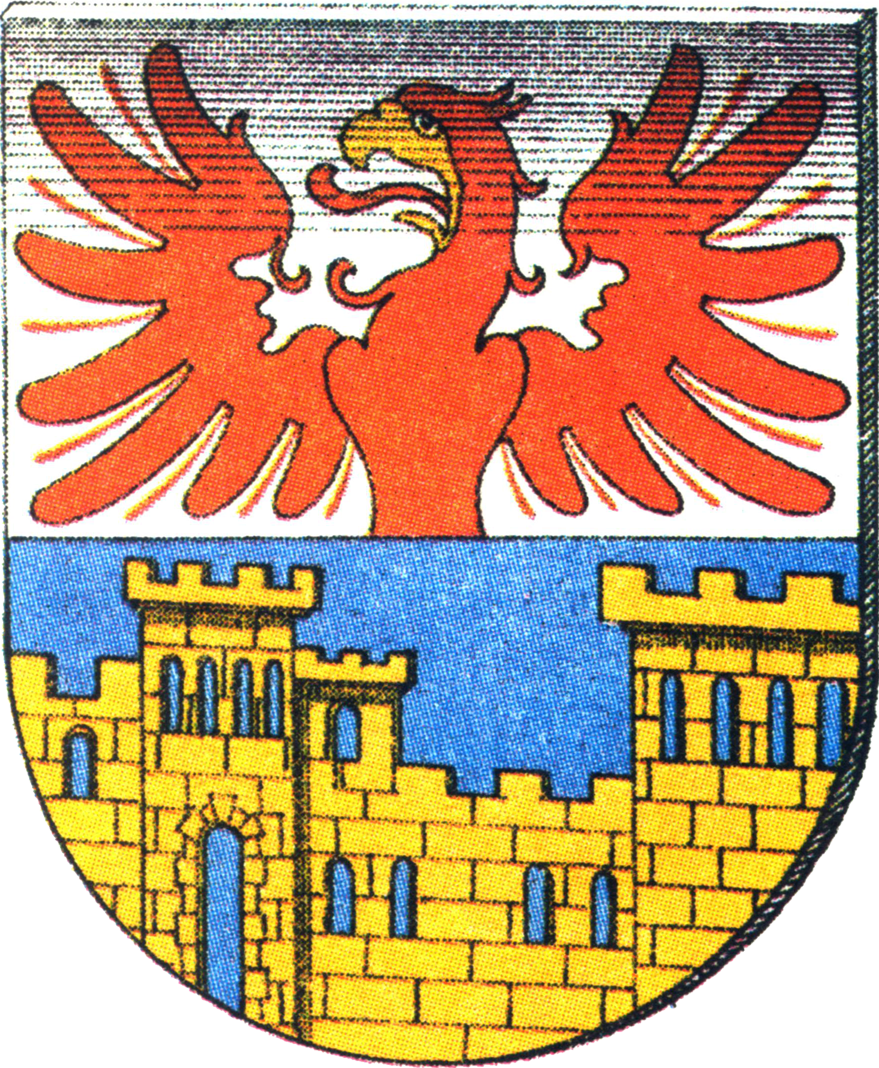
Neu-Cölln am Wasser, coat of arms

=== Rixdorf: Richard's village ===
At its official foundation in 1360 as a Knights Hospitaller angerdorf, Rixdorf had already been called Richarsdorp (Richardsdorf, "Richard's Village") for a long time. (Note: A proposed earlier toponym for the preceding Knights Templar hamlet is *Richardshof ("Richard's Court"); cf. Heike Schroll, Das Landesarchiv Berlin und seine Bestände: Übersicht der Bestände aus der Zeit bis 1945 (Tektonik-Gruppe A), Berliner Wissenschaftsverlag, Berlin, 2003, p. 134; in Low German the toponym would have been Richarshove; compare Tempelhof as Tempelhove. A potential date for the emergence of this hypothetical toponym is the stronghold's demilitarization into a manor (ca. 1245); however, the Templar yard or court could as well have been called Richarsdorp from the beginning, as that was already its toponym at the time of the village's official foundation in 1360. The foundational charter emphasizes the legal elevation to village status, and does not mention any renaming, earlier toponyms or planned extensions; furthermore, even as a yard, Richardsdorf had for a long time had several facilities and buildings (Eugen Brode, Geschichte Rixdorfs, Rixdorf 1899, p. 4 sq.), so the designation as a Dorf ("village") is more likely even for its Templar era before the legal status change in 1360.) Two alternate Low German spellings, Richarstorp and Richardstorff, are already present in the foundational charter. The village's name was usually pronounced with mostly elided or shifted consonants (German: [rˈɪkasdˌɔɾp]). Alternate spellings of the 14th century were Richardsdorp and Richardstorpp, while the 15th century introduced Reicherstorff, Richerstorp and Rigerstorp (1435). (Note: Sometimes written as Riegenstorp in later secondary sources.)

From the 16th century onward, vernacularly contracted forms took hold. (Note: Compare e.g. engl. Richard or Rickard → Rick.) Ricksdorf (1525) became a widely accepted spelling for two centuries, with many alternate forms appearing in historical records, for example Reichstorff (1541), Richstorff, Rigstorff (1542) and Richsdorf (1543), and in the 17th and 18th century Rechsdorff, Rechsdorp, Risdorf, Reichsdorp, Rieksdorf, Ryksdorf, Riecksdorff (1693) and Riechsdorf (1737). The earliest known source for Rixdorf is from the year 1709, and it became the official modern High German spelling in 1797. Still, the central historical localities Richardplatz and Richardstraße have retained the town's original etymology, and were never renamed to Rixplatz ("Rix Plaza") or Rixstraße ("Rix Road"). (Note: This is because the x in Rix- also originated from the original toponym's genitive s (Richardsdorf, "Richard's Village"), which was never part of the plaza's and street's toponyms.)

The mainstream theory on the etymology of Richardsdorf, and therefore of Rixdorf, assumes an eponymous individual called Richard, (Note: Main contemporary spellings were e.g. Richart and Rikard or latinized variants Ricardus and Richardus. Generally, the name Richard means "strong ruler" and stems from the Proto-Germanic roots *rīk- ("ruler", "leader") and *hardu- ("hardy", "strong"), originally from PIE *reg- ("to move in a straight line", "to lead", "to rule") and *kar- ("hard"). The syllable -dorp (Dorf, Old English thorp, "village") stems from the Proto-Germanic root *thurpa- ("pen", "compound", "fenced area"), and possily from PIE *treb- ("dwelling"). Taking into account the proposed older toponym *Richardshof, the word Hof (hove) is a cognate of Hufe ("oxgang") from Proto-Germanic *hōfaz and the root *hōfa- ("hoof"), possibly originating from PIE *kop- ("to beat", "to strike").) allegedly a local Knight Templar, bailiff or commander of the Tempelhof commandery, or even the original administrator or chief settler (Lokator) of Richardsdorf in the early 13th to 14th century. However, no Richard is mentioned in historical sources in connection with the Templar villages of the Teltow, let alone an actual Knight Templar per Alemanniam et Slaviam, so alternate etymologies were eventually propagated, (Note: A prominent contemporary Richard with at least indirect connections to the Templar Order was Richard of Cornwall (died 1272), who in 1241 during the Barons' Crusade negotiated a proper burial for the Templars killed at the Battle at Gaza, and who also transferred sovereignty over Ascalon castle to the German king Frederick II, who had already laid the groundwork for the German colonization of the Teltow region after the Northern Crusades (see below); Richard became King of the Romans (and therefore of Germany) in 1257, however against the vote by Brandenburg's Margrave John I. The only prominent contemporary Knight Templar called Richard was Richart (Richardus) de Bures (Richard de Bures), who, at the time when Rixdorf's original Templar stronghold was demilitarized into a manor (ca. 1245, see below), served as Templar grand master after the death or capture of his predecessor Armand de Périgord in 1244, and who himself died a Templar martyr on 9 May 1247 during the battle at Lake Tiberias, which was followed by the destruction of Tiberias. However, only the former of these two Richards has ever been proposed in Richardsdorf etymologies. For the later Hospitaller era (since 1318), no person called Richard has been associated with Richardsdorf or Tempelhof in the extant historical records.) while exaggerating folk etymologies also emerged and tried to connect the toponym to important historical or canonized Richards. (Note: Among them were nobleman and Christian saint Richard the Pilgrim (died 720), famous crusader king Richard the Lionheart (died 1199), and primarily bishop Richard of Chichester (died 1253), who was canonized in 1262 and eventually became a popular saint in Europe, but possibly too late to have influenced the toponym Richarsdorp. Still, in 1930 he was chosen as the eponymous patron saint of the original St. Richard chapel in Rixdorf.) In modern times, alternate spellings like Reichsdorp spawned secondary folk etymologies different from Richard, namely from Reich ("empire") or the surname Reich or Ryk, but without taking the documented earlier variants and vernacular contractions into account. (Note: The latter hypothesis was presented in Friedrich Nicolai, Beschreibung der königlichen Residenzstädte Berlin und Potsdam, Berlin 1779–86, Vol. 3 (1786), p. 1047, s.v. "I. Anhang: Umgebung von Berlin – Ryksdorf, Britz – IV. Vor dem Kottbusserthore"; Nicolai propagated an origin from the Ryke (Reiche) family, one of Cölln's and Berlin's old patrician dynasties (see also Rykestraße), who allegedly had founded the hamlet in the 13th century. Apart from the toponym's known etymological progression from Richardsdorf, the theory created chronological problems, because the Ryke history in Tempelhof only began in the 14th century: in 1344, Johannes Ryke, a patrician citizen of Cölln, had been given the schultheiß court of Marienfelde south of Tempelhof by Herrenmeister (Lord of the Knights) Hermann von Werberg, bailiff and Statthalter (Governor) of Brandenburg, who in turn would play an important role in the official foundation of Richardsdorf (see below), which might have been the impetus for Nicolai's alternate theory; this, however, demanded that the Ryke family's local political influence needed to be backdated by at least a century (Eugen Brode, Geschichte Rixdorfs, Rixdorf 1899, p. 6). Generally, for the theories on Neukölln's Rixdorf, no primary sources exist that would refute the Richard etymology and corroborate a clear distinction between the later contracted form Rixdorf and its sufficiently documented toponymic origin as Richarsdorp.) Ideas of a Slavic origin were non-academic and anecdotal at best, and are disregarded in modern literature. (Note: One etymological hypothesis surmised an origin from Slavic *rъžь ("rye"), leading to Rixdorf as Roggendorf ("rye village"); alternatively, the Slavic *rykъ (*rykati, ricas, "to growl, roar"), with Rixdorf roughly as Lärmerdorf ("village of bawlers"), was also said to be a possible etymological root. However, Slavic origin theories had already been rejected in the 19th century; cf. Eugen Brode, Geschichte Rixdorfs, Rixdorf 1899, p. 6; Gundakkar Klaussen, "Rixdorf, Preußens jüngste Stadt", in: Adolf Kröner (ed.), Die Gartenlaube 8, Leipzig 1899, p. 246 sq. A hydronymic origin from *rěka (reka, "river"), alluding to the river Spree, whose eastern shores belonged to the Tempelhof dominion, after a dialectal shift from reka to rika, with Rixdorf as Flussdorf ("river village"), is not possible, because ikavisms or similar yat reflexes to /i/ did not exist in the West Slavic dialects of the region.) Instead, Rixdorf is regarded as a classic example of a toponym based on a founder's or important leader's name, comparable to other localities of Berlin like Heinersdorf (from Hinrick, Heinrich) and Reinickendorf (from Reginhard, Reinicke, Reinhard).

=== Neukölln: the new colony ===
In the 12th and early 13th centuries, during the time of Albert the Bear's and his successors' foundational advances into the region of modern-day Brandenburg and Berlin, Latin had been the administrative lingua franca of the Mediaeval Holy Roman Empire. The immigrating colonists mostly spoke dialects of the German common language, (Note: See also Theodiscus; Deutsche, unlike the English or French terms Germans or Allemands seem to suggest, was never an ethnic term, and instead denoted the (common) people who spoke theodiscus (deutsch), the language "of the people"; to this day, the individual term for a German is therefore Deutscher ("common person", "person who speaks the [common] deutsche language"), derived from the original adjective deutsch (O.H.G. diutisc), not from the later noun and toponym Deutschland as Deutschländer ("citizen of Deutschland"), which is only (and only occasionally) used as a neologistical term for Turks in Germany or as a sometimes pejorative pars pro toto for all German citizens or residents with a migration background.) while the Hevelli and Sprevane, the Slavic tribes who had replaced the original Germanic natives of the region, spoke West Slavic languages, for example Old-Polabian. For this reason, the toponyms of many of Berlin's localities have a Slavic origin, including Berlin itself, whose name, in spite of its earliest Latin form as Berolinum, (Note: See also the city's female personification as Berolina.) possibly stems from Proto-Slavic *berl-/*brl-, an obscure root which is usually interpreted as "bog", "moor" or "swamp". (Note: The Old-Polabian toponym Berlin or Birlin ("swamp area") was also used with a definite article as der Berlin ("the Berlin"), which strongly suggests a Slavic plot name, e.g. "the swamp", instead of a preceding Slavic settlement; cf. Arnt Cobbers, Kleine Berlin-Geschichte – Vom Mittelalter bis zur Gegenwart, Berlin 2008, p. 14; see also etymology of Berlin.)

The name Neukölln, however, is in many ways an exception to Berlin's toponymic rules. When Rixdorf was rechristened Neukölln in 1912, the city's new name was a catch-all term. It logically referenced several places in the vicinity, namely the Cölln Heath to the east, as well as Cölln itself, Alt-Berlin's historical twin city, which had been Rixdorf's feudal parent city for several generations (see below). The primary reference, however, was to the Neucöllner Siedlungen (Neucölln Estates), which had been constructed on the Berlinische Wiesen just north of the old Rixdorf in the decades before the renaming. The estates' name recalled the meadows' old name Cöllnische Wiesen (Cölln Meadows), and thereby, whether intentionally or not, imitated Neu-Cölln, an old district south of the medieval part of Berlin and Cölln proper. This historical Neu-Cölln, sometimes written Neu-Cöln or neu Cölln, was at first also called Neu-Cölln am Wasser ("New Cölln by the water"). (Note: The "water" referenced both Neu-Cölln's southern military moat, which was later filled, and the historical Cöllnischer Stadtgraben ("Cölln Moat") between Cölln and Neu-Cölln, which later became the Spree Canal west and south of Spree Island; see also Fischerinsel, the southern neighborhood on Spree Island.) It was built in 1662 as the southern military extension of the city of Cölln, and remained a small district of Berlin until the Greater Berlin Act of 1920, when it was dissolved in the new Mitte quarter of the homonymous borough. (Note: This means that from 1912 to 1920, the region had two localities that bore virtually the same name, Berlin's small district Neu-Kölln and vis-à-vis the city Neukölln. Today, the area of the historical Neu-Cölln is part of the Luisenstadt neighborhood (named after the historical Luisenstadt), and it is almost never called by its historical name, but places like the Köllnischer Park, originally a military bastion in Neu-Cölln (Bastion VII), still point to the origin of the toponym Neukölln.)

The etymology of Cölln, and therefore of Neukölln ("New Cölln"), is from imperial Latin colonia ("colony", "settlement", "colonial town"), (Note: From Latin colonus (i.a. "settler in a foreign land") and colere (i.a. "to cultivate", "to inhabit"), originally from the PIE root *kwel- (i.a. "to dwell").) and the colonial town in Brandenburg was at first called Colonia (1237) (Note: In a reference to a priest as Symeon plebanus de Colonia (28 October 1237).) and Colonia juxta Berlin (1247, "colony near Berlin"). In the same manner as the toponym of modern-day Köln (Cologne), the former Roman Colonia Claudia Ara Agrippinensium (50 CE) and Colonia Agrippina (322), was gradually Germanized from post-Roman Colonia (since 450) to its Mediaeval names Colne, Coellen, and Cölln, so was Brandenburg's Holy Roman Colonia, first partially to Colne prope Berlin (1344, "Colne near Berlin"), then to Collen (1440), before settling on Cölln in later centuries. (Note: Manfred Niemeyer (ed.), Deutsches Ortsnamenbuch, Berlin/Boston 2012, p. 60 s.v. "Berlin: II, III"; id., p. 323 s.v. "Köln: III, IV"; cf. Winfried Schich, "Das mittelalterliche Berlin (1237–1411)", in: Wolfgang Ribbe, Geschichte Berlins 1, München 1988, p. 146–206. A direct adoption of Cologne's Latin name (Joachim Herrmann [1937] in: id. et al., Berlin. Ergebnisse der heimatkundlichen Bestandsaufnahme, Reihe "Werte unserer Heimat" 49/50, Berlin 1987, p. 143 sq.) is therefore less likely than a new Holy Roman colony next to (the) Berlin receiving its toponym Colonia independently, which was then gradually Germanized like its counterpart on the Rhine. An even older hypothesis, which mirrored Berlin's etymology and tried to postulate a Slavic origin of the new colony's name, surmised an obscure base form *Kol'no from *kol ("stake, spigot"); cf. Emil Stutzer, Die Deutschen Großstädte – Einst und Jetzt, Berlin/Braunschweig/Hamburg 1917; this is an unlikely etymology, especially given the fact that no remnants of a Slavic settlement preceding the new colonia were ever found, but still cannot be completely ruled out; cf. Manfred Niemeyer (ed.), Deutsches Ortsnamenbuch, Berlin/Boston 2012, p. 60 s.v. "Berlin: II, III". Older treatises had disregarded a potential Slavic in favor of a Latin origin as a sui generis name for a colonia nova (new colony), but left open the possibility that the colonists had been inspired by Cologne's Latin name; cf. i.a. Jan Hendrik Regenbogen, Commentatio de Bello Sacro, Leiden 1819, p. 245 sq.: "Coloniam ad Spream quoque ea aetate conditam fuisse, ita nominatum vel a Colonia nova, vel ab advenis, e Colonia Agrippina oriundis, admodum est verisimile […]." It was a common, but never verified belief among the people until the early 18th century that many colonists had migrated to Brandenburg's Colonia directly from Cologne on the Rhine, which spawned the secondary hypothesis that at least the later Germanized spelling Cölln was inspired by Rhenish Cölln (Cologne); Ernst Fidicin (ed.), Historisch-diplomatische Beiträge zur Geschichte der Stadt Berlin, Vol. 3, Berlin 1837, p. 3 sq., n. 3.) Latin literature kept referring to Cölln as Colonia. To distinguish it from Cologne, toponym extensions were often applied, for example Marchiae ("of the March [Brandenburg]"), or ad Spream, ad Spreeam or ad Spreham ("on the [river] Spree"), or Brandenburgica ("Brandenburgian"). Even though neither Neukölln nor the historical Neu-Cölln were ever officially called Nova Colonia, (Note: Similar to Berolina, the name of Berlin's historical personification, the ahistorical toponym Nova Colonia is used occasionally by associations and companies in the Neukölln quarter and borough, for example the chamber choir Capella Nova Colonia, while the variant Colonia Nova is the name of an event venue and congress center in northern Rixdorf, situated very close to the area of the historical Neucölln Estates.) etymologically Neukölln still translates as "New Colony", which was a fitting new name for a city that since the first German colonists of the early 13th century until today has always been a prominent destination for settlers and immigrants.

== Timeline ==
Date	Toponym	Notes
1190^{[tpq]} – 1210^{[taq]}	Richardsdorf (Note: A proposed alternate toponym for the earlier Templar era is Richardshof; Heike Schroll, Das Landesarchiv Berlin und seine Bestände: Übersicht der Bestände aus der Zeit bis 1945 (Tektonik-Gruppe A), Berliner Wissenschaftsverlag, Berlin, 2003, p. 134. However, the first historical source for any toponym is the 1360 foundational charter, which only contains Richarsdorp (Richardsdorf) and two similar variants (see above). The exact chronological origin of the received toponym Richardsdorf is unknown, but a potential terminus ad quem is the Templar estate's demilitarization ca. 1245.)	established as a Knights Templar military stronghold
1245 (approx.)	Richardsdorf	demilitarized into a Templar manor
1312	Richardsdorf	ruled interim by the House of Ascania
1318	Richardsdorf	ruled by the Knights Hospitaller
26 June 1360	Richardsdorf	elevated to official village status under Hospitaller rule
23 September 1435	Richardsdorf	becomes a treasury village and fief of Alt-Berlin and Cölln
24 August 1543	Ricksdorf	becomes a treasury village and fief of Cölln
1 January 1710	Rixdorf	becomes a treasury village and fief of the newly unified Berlin
31 May 1737	Böhmisch-Rixdorf	founded as a new Bohemian colony
1791	Böhmisch-Rixdorf	granted its own administration
1797	Böhmisch- & Deutsch-Rixdorf	use Rixdorf as the new official spelling
13 December 1872	Böhmisch- & Deutsch-Rixdorf	become part of Brandenburg's 24th bailiwick
1 January 1874	Rixdorf	unites and joins the Teltow administrative district
1 April 1899	Rixdorf	becomes an independent city
1 May 1899	Rixdorf	becomes a free city
27 January 1912	Neukölln	adopted by Rixdorf as its new name
1 October 1920	Berlin-Neukölln	created as a quarter in Greater Berlin's 14th borough Neukölln
1 January 2001	Berlin-Neukölln	reorganized together with Neukölln as Berlin's 8th borough

== Historical maps ==
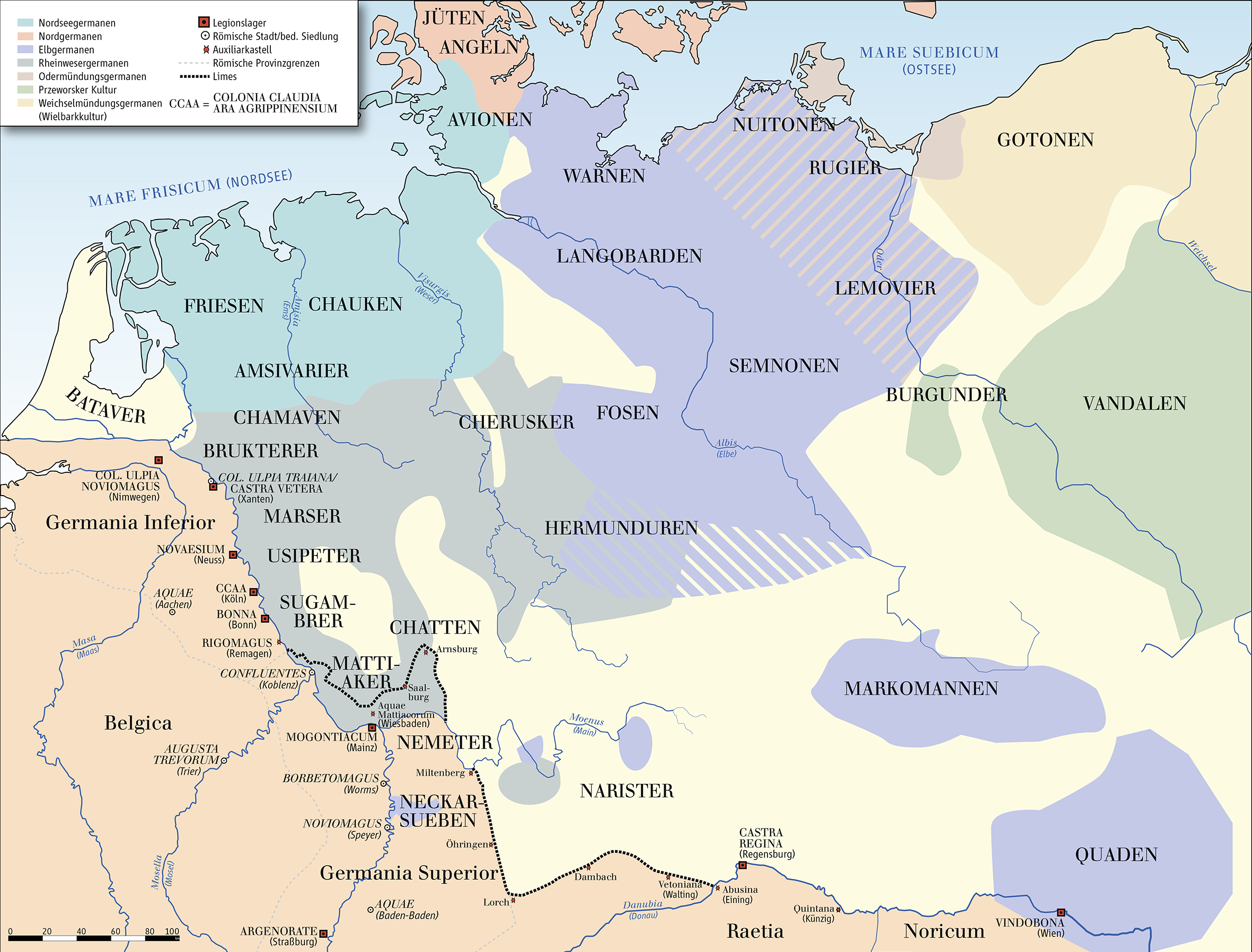
Germanic peoples of Germania Magna, 50 CE

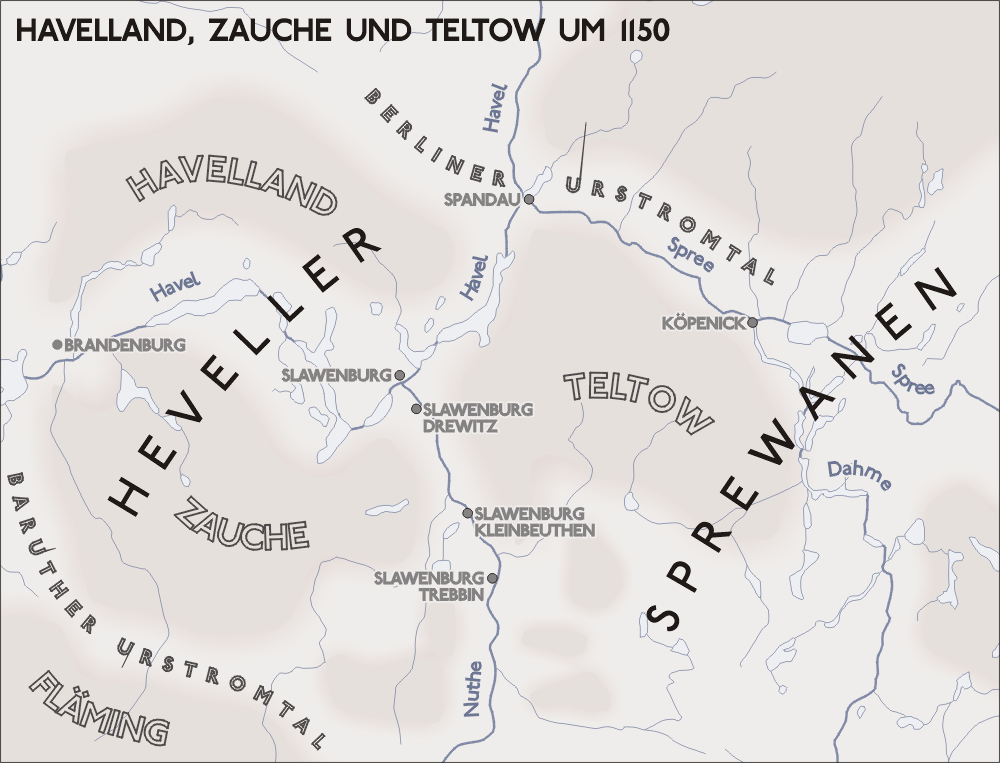
Slavic settlements in the Berlin region, ca. 1150

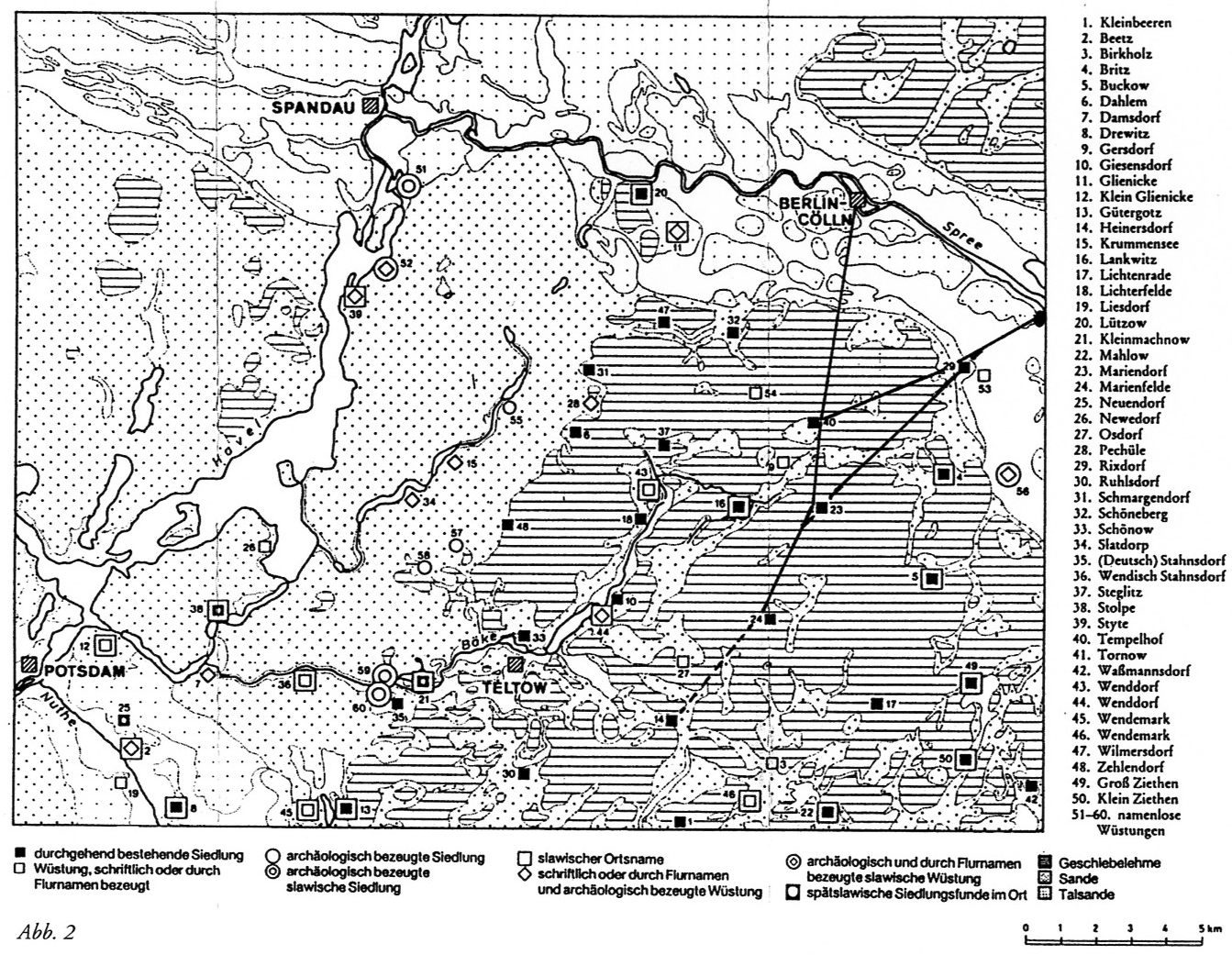
Templar villages and courts on the Teltow, 13th century (Note: Including [40] Tempelhof, [23] Mariendorf, [24] Marienfelde, [29] Rixdorf, [53] Rixdorf's first folwark, here labeled as namenlose Wüstung ("nameless abandoned site"); Rixdorf's second Templar folwark, which was later known as the Burgwall, is not numbered, but is situated east-northeast of Rixdorf at the end of the road from Tempelhof to the river Spree.)

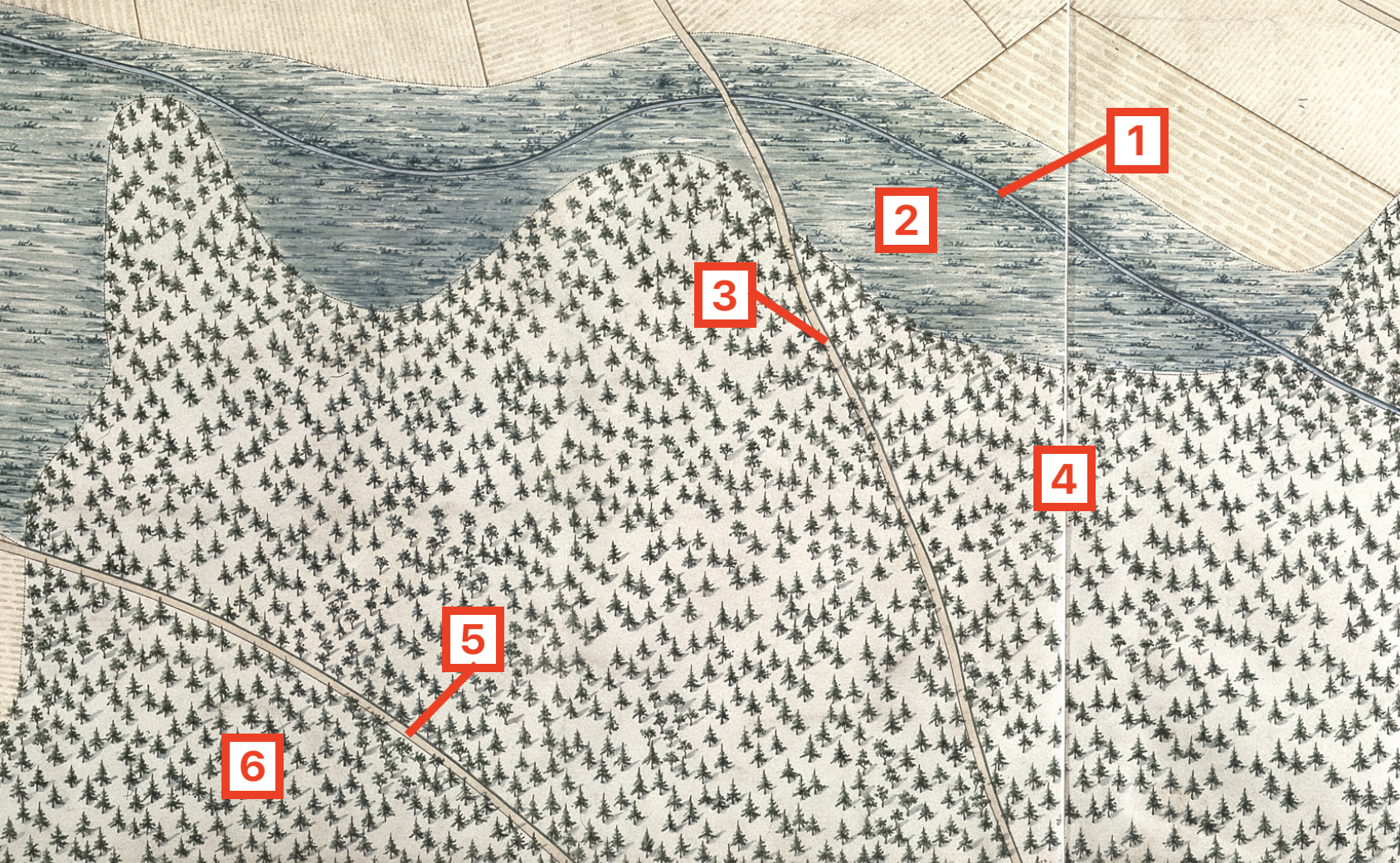
Undeveloped Ricksdorf lot with Hasenheide, 1685 (Note: With marked locations [1] Schafgraben (modern-day Landwehrkanal), [2] Cöllnische Wiesen (Reuterkiez, Maybachufer), [3] Ricksdorfscher Damm (Kottbusser Damm), [4] Cöllnische Heide (Reuterkiez), [5] road to Hallesches Tor (Urbanstraße) and [6] Hasenheide.)

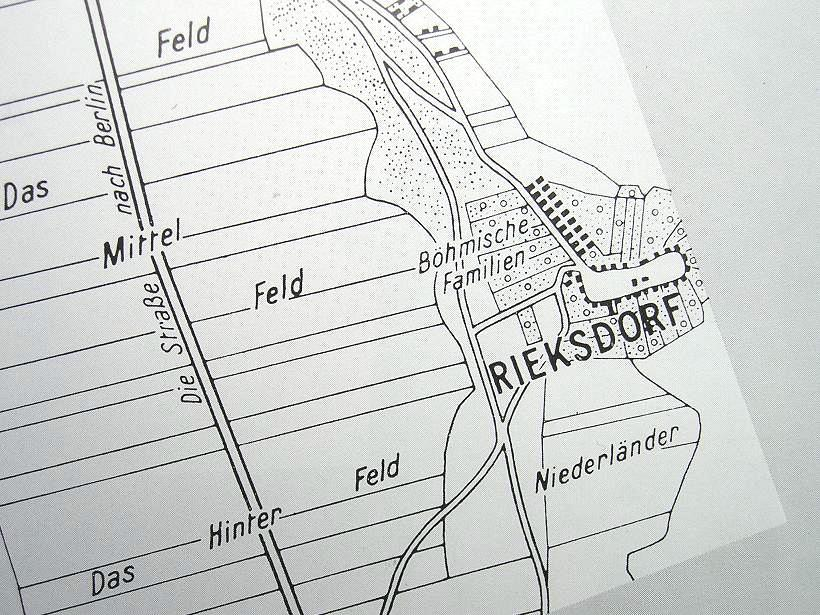
Rixdorf with its new Bohemian settlement, 1740

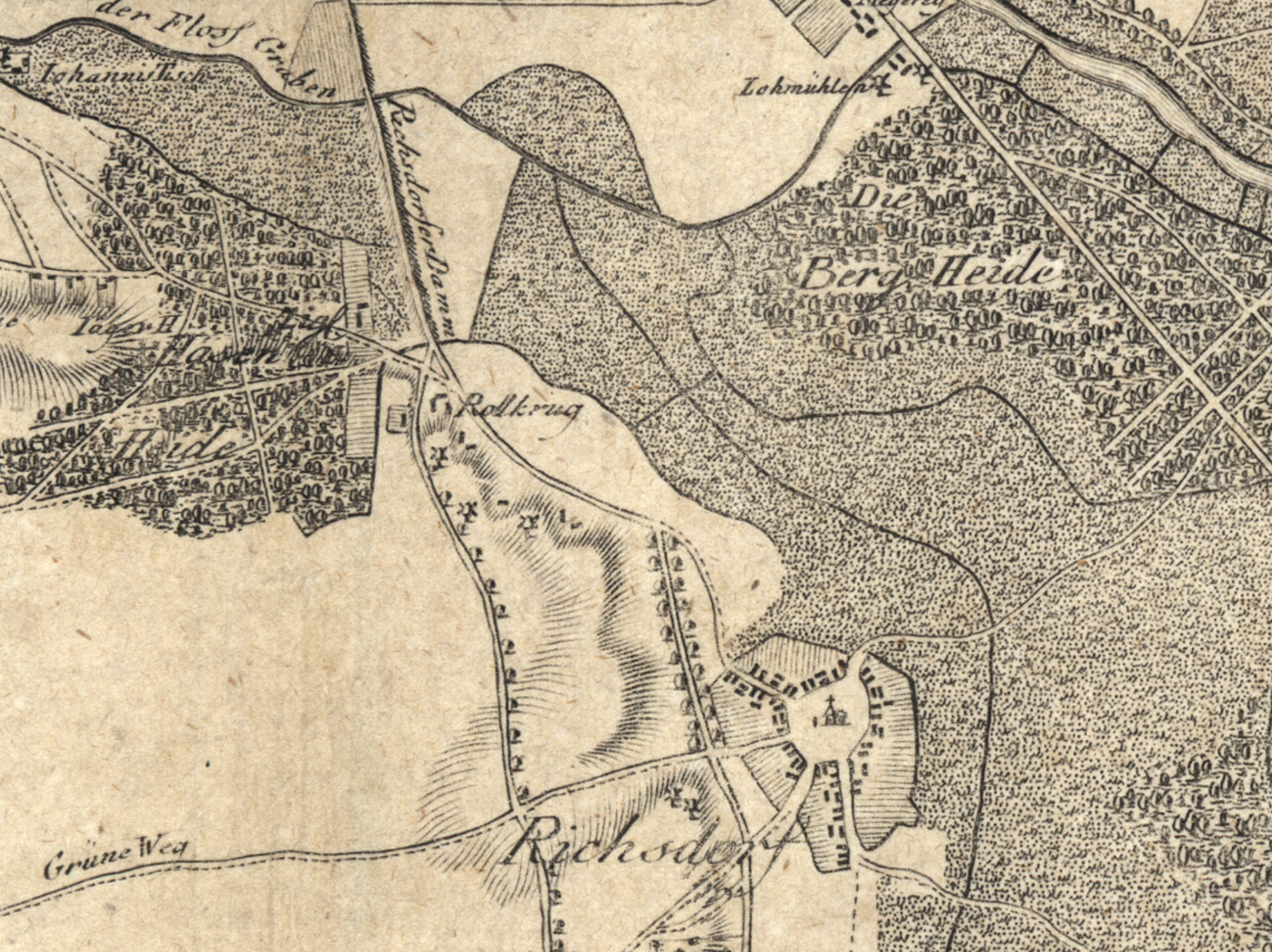
Rixdorf with Hasenheide and the Cöllnische Wiesen, 1786

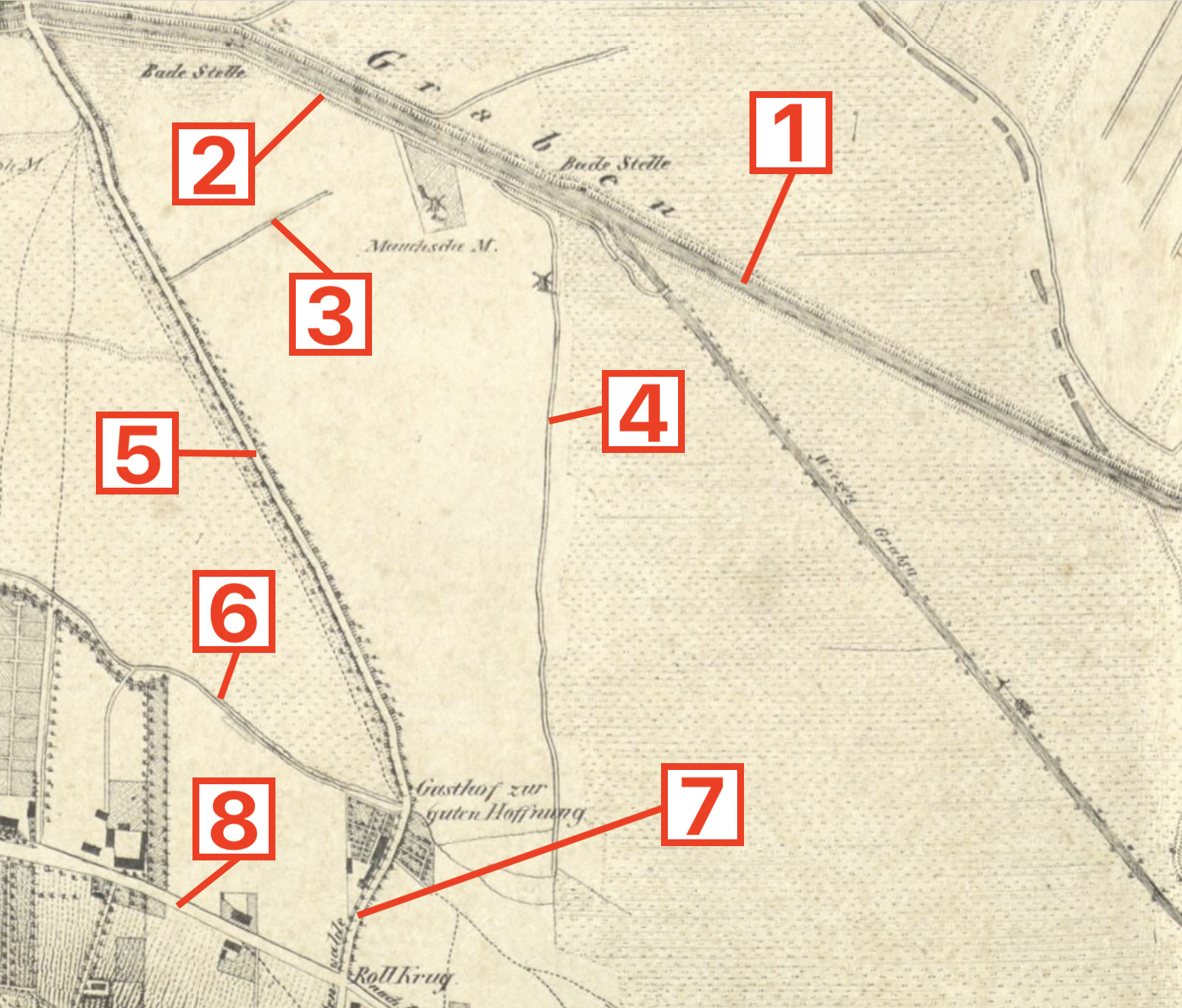
Undeveloped Reuterkiez, 1827 (Note: With marked modern-day locations [1] Landwehrkanal, [2] Maybachufer, [3] Schinkestraße/Bürknerstraße (approximate), [4] Friedelstraße, [5] Kottbusser Damm, [6] Urbanstraße, [7] Hermannplatz with Rollkrug and [8] Hasenheide.)

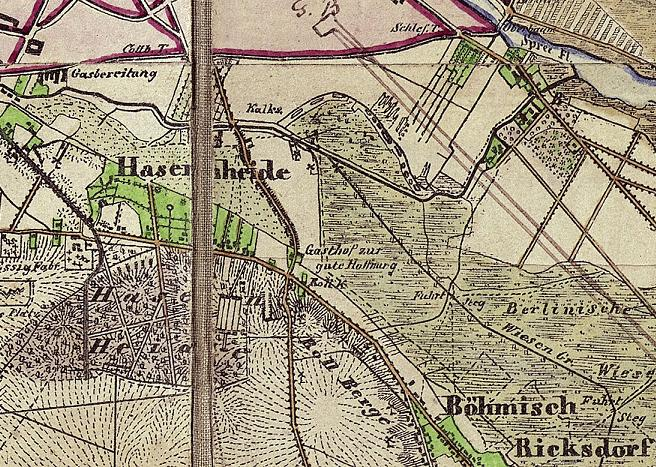
Hasenheide and the Berlinische Wiesen, 1842

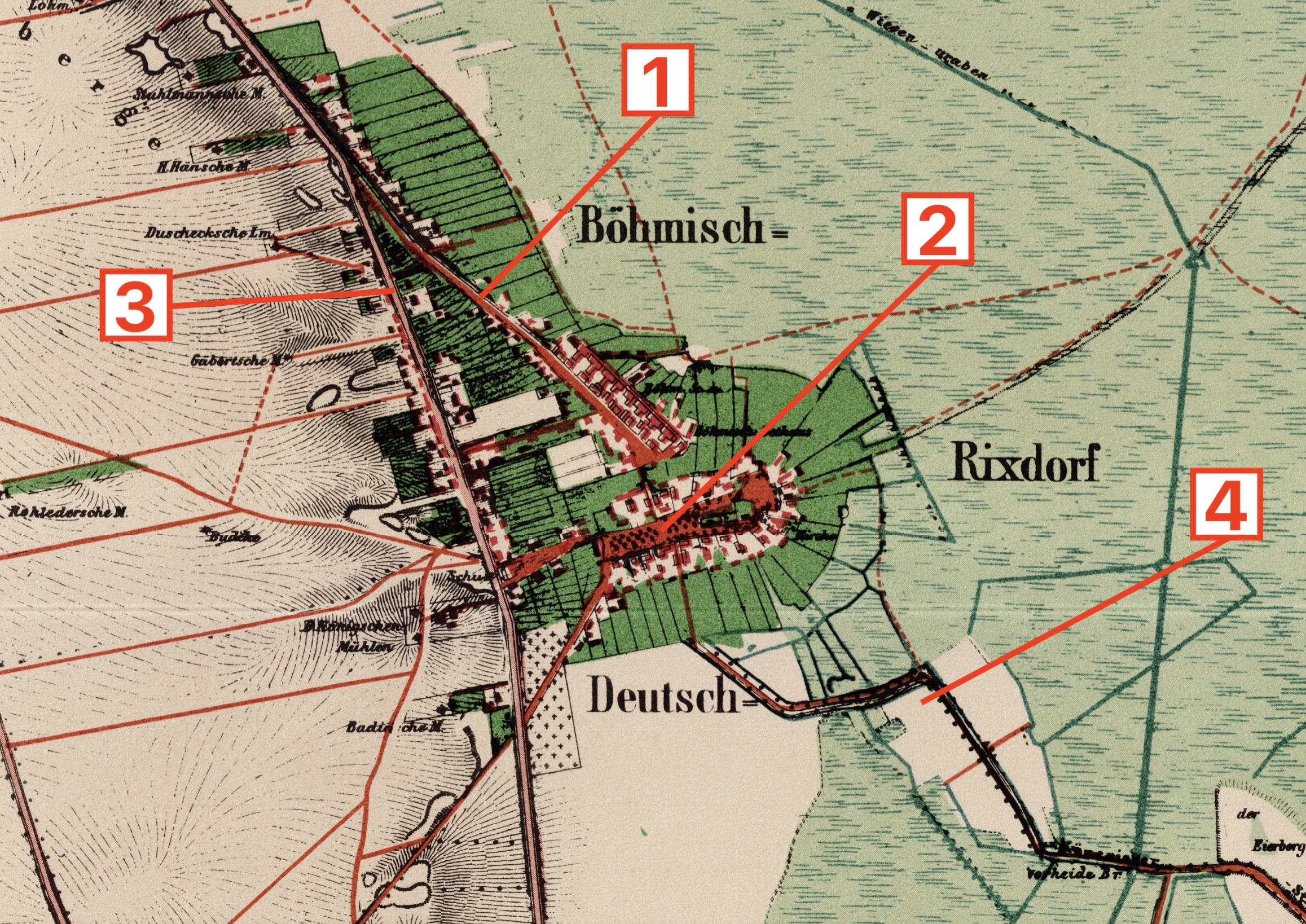
Deutsch- and Böhmisch-Rixdorf, 1857 (Note: With marked modern-day locations [1] Richardstraße, [2] Richardplatz, [3] Karl-Marx-Straße and [4] the corner of Niemetzstraße and Braunschweiger Straße, the approximate location of Rixdorf's unnamed (abandoned) folwark.)

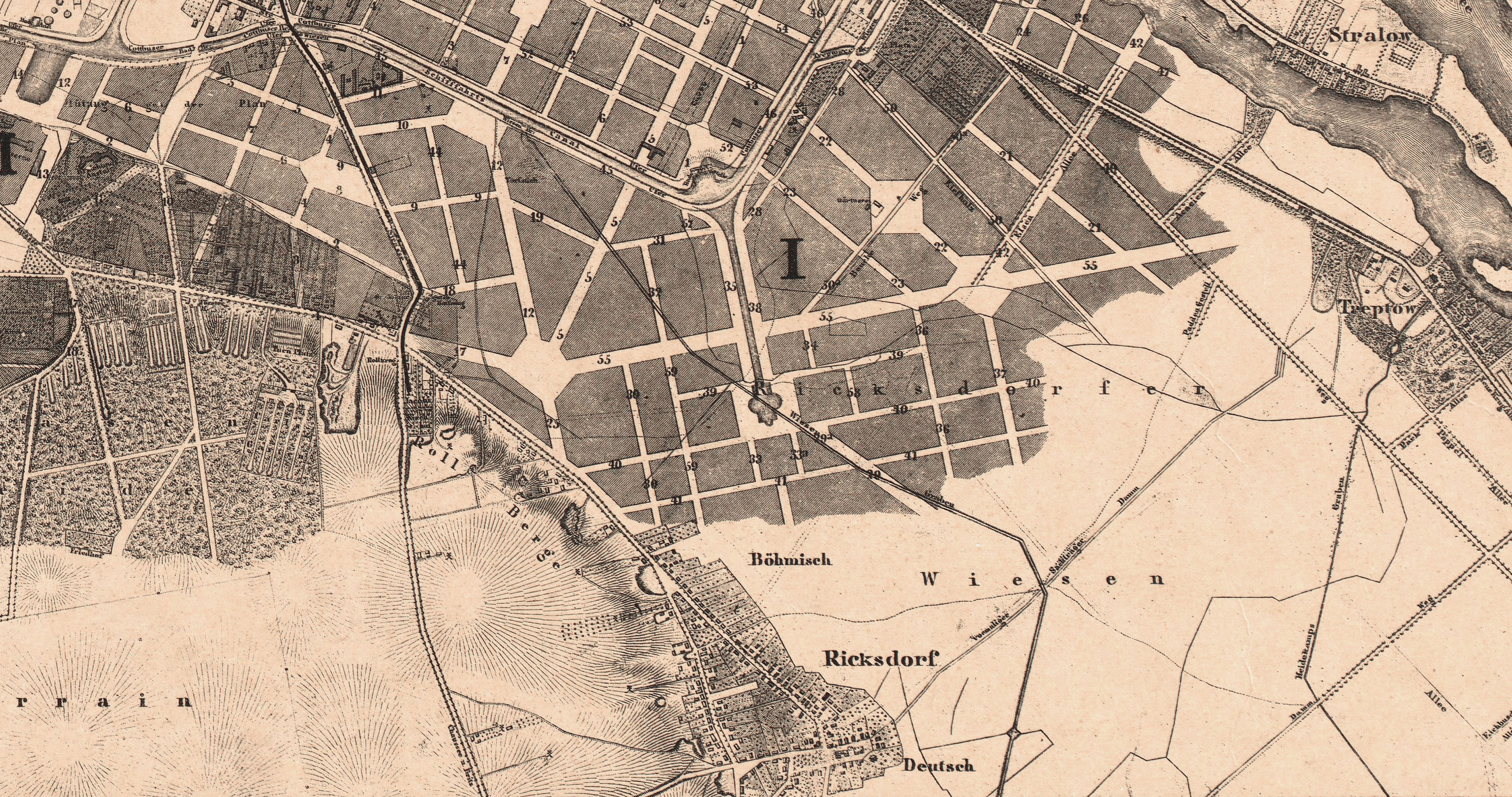
Deutsch- and Böhmisch-Rixdorf with Hobrecht's development plan, 1862

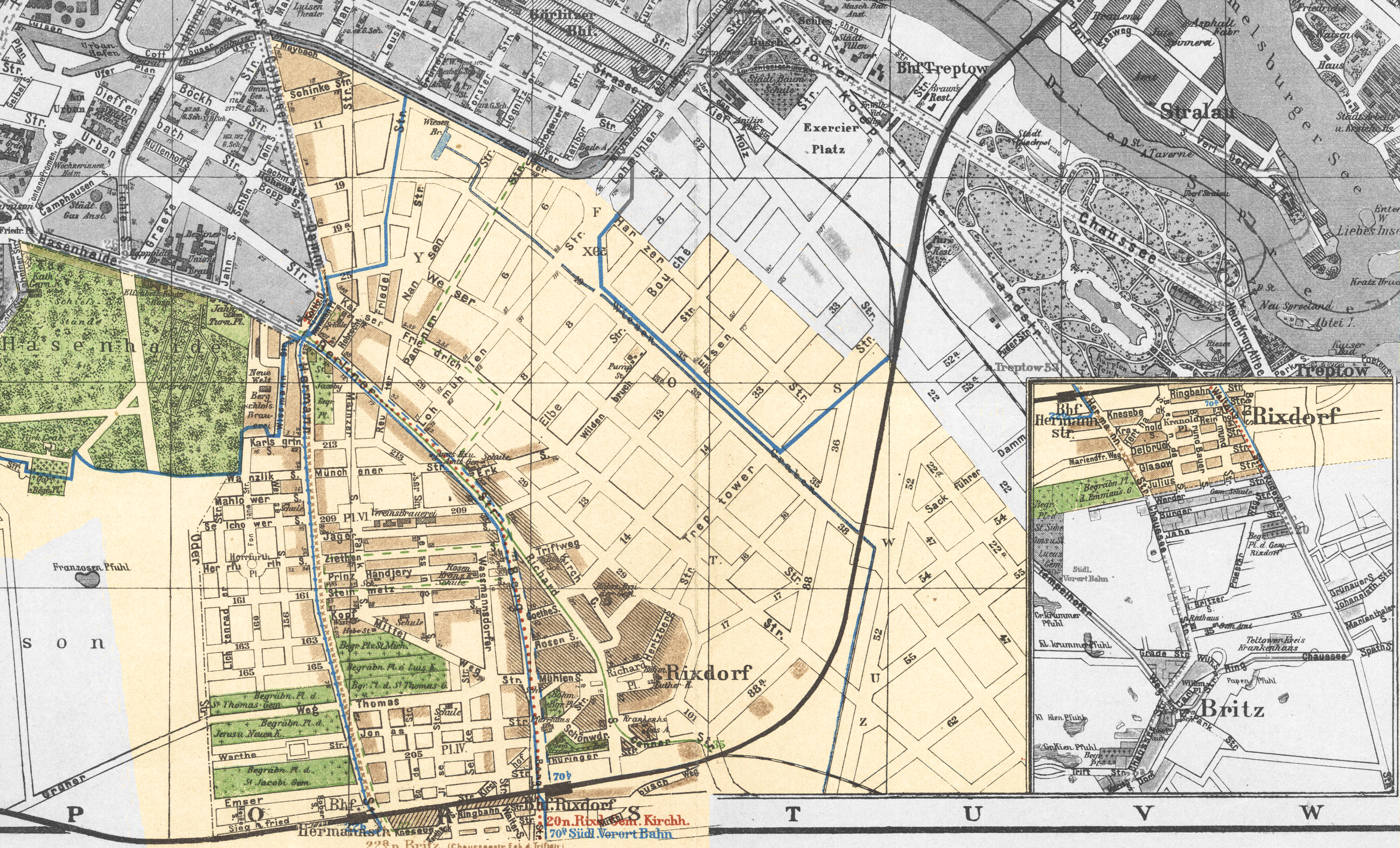
Rixdorf with modern development plan, 1900

== Prehistory ==
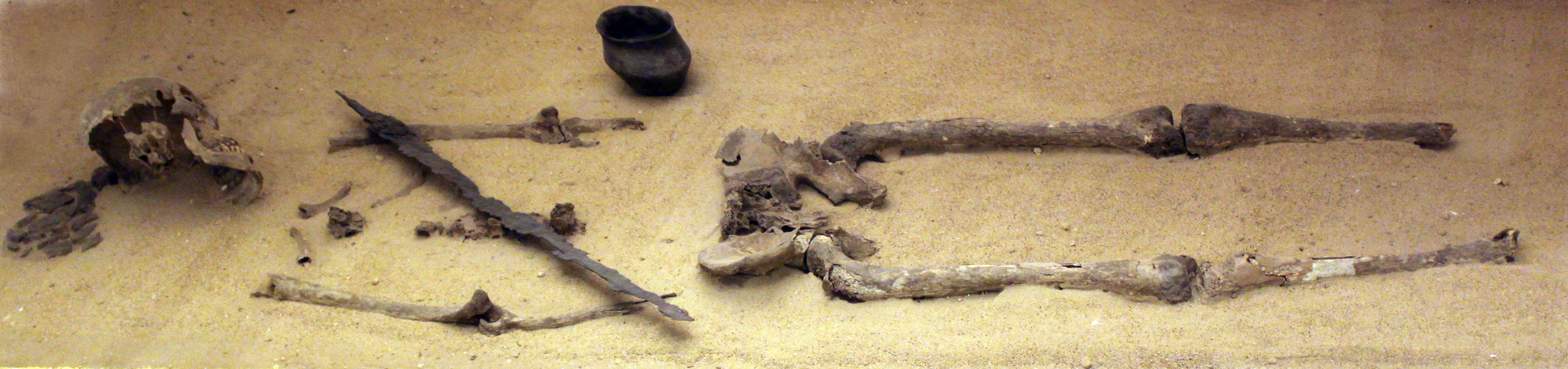
Germanic equestrian tomb of Neukölln

Archeological finds on the Rixdorf lot point to a Germanic prehistory of Neukölln, (Note: Prehistorical overview and historical chronology, settlement history and monuments i.a. in Berlin-Neukölln, seine Geschichte und Denkmale: Rixdorf, Bezirksamt Neukölln, Berlin 1999 (online copy); for more detailed annals of Rixdorf and Neukölln from its inception to 1999, cf. Manfred Motel, Chronik von Rixdorf, Berlin 1999 (online copy).) with evidence of a settlement since the late Neolithic age, like early flint tools, potsherds from the Bronze Age on Richardplatz, or Iron Age burial urns in the Hasenheide. Finds from the era of the Roman Empire were ubiquitous in Berlin, which includes West-Germanic terps and ceramics on the Richardplatz, a Gordianic bronze coin on the Rollberge, (Note: Originally minted in Singidunum, it was either a coeval monetary import or reused in more recent times as a pendant.) and nearby the important Reitergrab von Neukölln (equestrian tomb) south-west of Richardplatz at the Körnerpark, which stems from the onset of the Merowingian era in the first half of the 6th century. (Note: I.a. Albert Kiekebusch, "Ein germanisches Reitergrab aus der späten Völkerwanderungszeit von Neukölln (Rixdorf) bei Berlin", Praehistorische Zeitschrift IV 3/4, 1912. Today, the Reitergrab is on display at the Märkisches Museum.)

The original tribes that lived in the Berlin region belonged to the Elbe-Germanic Suevian Semnones. They eventually migrated southwestward during the era of the Barbarian Invasions (Note: Starting in the third century CE until ca. 500 CE, almost all of the Germanic tribes of the region migrated from Germania Magna across the limes to the Upper Rhineland and became part of the wider and partially Romanized Alemannic culture; see also Swabia and Alamannia. In a twist of historical irony, a significant number of Swabians, the modern-day descendants of the ancient Suevi, have been return-migrating to Berlin since the late 1980s, leading to pronounced anti-Swabian sentiments, especially in the alternative culture of former central East Berlin, with the term Schwabe (Swabian) eventually having morphed into a pars pro toto koinonym for all modern Western immigrants perceived as the drivers of gentrification.) and, after a short period of Burgundian through-migration, were superseded by the West Slavic Sprevane and Hevelli, historically called the Wends, but archeological traces pertaining to a successive Sprevane settlement were never found in the area of modern-day Neukölln. (Note: The same is true for the historical centers of Berlin and Cölln; the Slavic tribes had mostly settled on the plateaus surrounding Berlin's glacial valley, i.e. the Sprevane on the Barnim and the Teltow, e.g. in Rudow in the south of the Neukölln borough, and on the rivers Spree and Dahme, e.g. in Trebow and Copnic, and the Hevelli in the Havelland and the Zauche, and on the rivers Havel and Nuthe, e.g. in Spandow and Poztupimi; cf. Horst Ulrich, Uwe Prell, Ernst Luuk, "Besiedlung des Berliner Raums", in: Berlin Handbuch, Berlin 1992, p. 127 sq.) From the early era of post-Germanic German colonization, only scanty potsherds were excavated, and the remnants of mediaeval chain mail were typical of the 13th or 14th century, the times when the Knights Templar and Hospitaller already ruled over nascent Neukölln.

== Early history ==
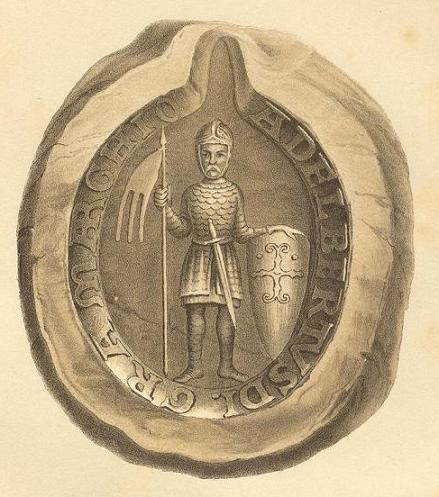
Seal of Albert the Bear

After four centuries of colonization, the region around modern-day Berlin came under lasting Holy Roman rule in the 12th century as part of the Ascanian Margraviate of Brandenburg, founded by Albert the Bear in 1157. (Note: In the wake of the Northern Crusades, Albert was appointed margrave of the Northern March, including the Teltow, in 1134 by Lothair III after a testamentary contract between Albert and Hevellian prince Pribislav-Henry (1129). When Pribislav-Henry died in 1150, Albert became his successor and proclaimed the new margraviate in 1157.) The region was situated near the borders to the Principality of Copnic, ruled by Sprevan prince Jaksa of Kopanica, (Note: In a short war of succession against Albert, Jaksa laid claim to Brandenburg and occupied the region in 1157, but retreated without a fight in the same year after transfer negotiations. Pomerania became part of Brandenburg only decades later (see below).) and the Duchy of Pomerania-Demmin, ruled by Casimir I, which had all fought for dominance during the colonization of the Teltow and the formation of Brandenburg. Albert's successor Otto I defeated Casimir I in 1180, and following the rule of Otto II, margrave Albert II managed to secure a large part of the Teltow until 1212, but lost the Duchy of Pomerania again to the House of Griffin. His two sons, margraves John I and Otto III, jointly ruled Brandenburg from 1220 to 1266/67, secured the remaining parts of the Teltow, established many new towns, and are regarded as the conditores (framers) of Colonia (Cölln) and the old town of Berlin. (Note: Archeological finds pertaining to the construction of a trading place at the river Spree were dated to the 1170s, and the oldest discovered burials in Cölln to the 1160s (Gisela Graichen & Matthias Wemhoff, Gründerzeit 1200: Wie das Mittelalter unsere Städte erfand, Berlin 2024); however, both the parochial establishment and the foundation of Berlin's and Cölln's royal court fall into the reign of the so-called Stadtgründer (city founders) John I and Otto III.)

=== Knights Templar stronghold ===
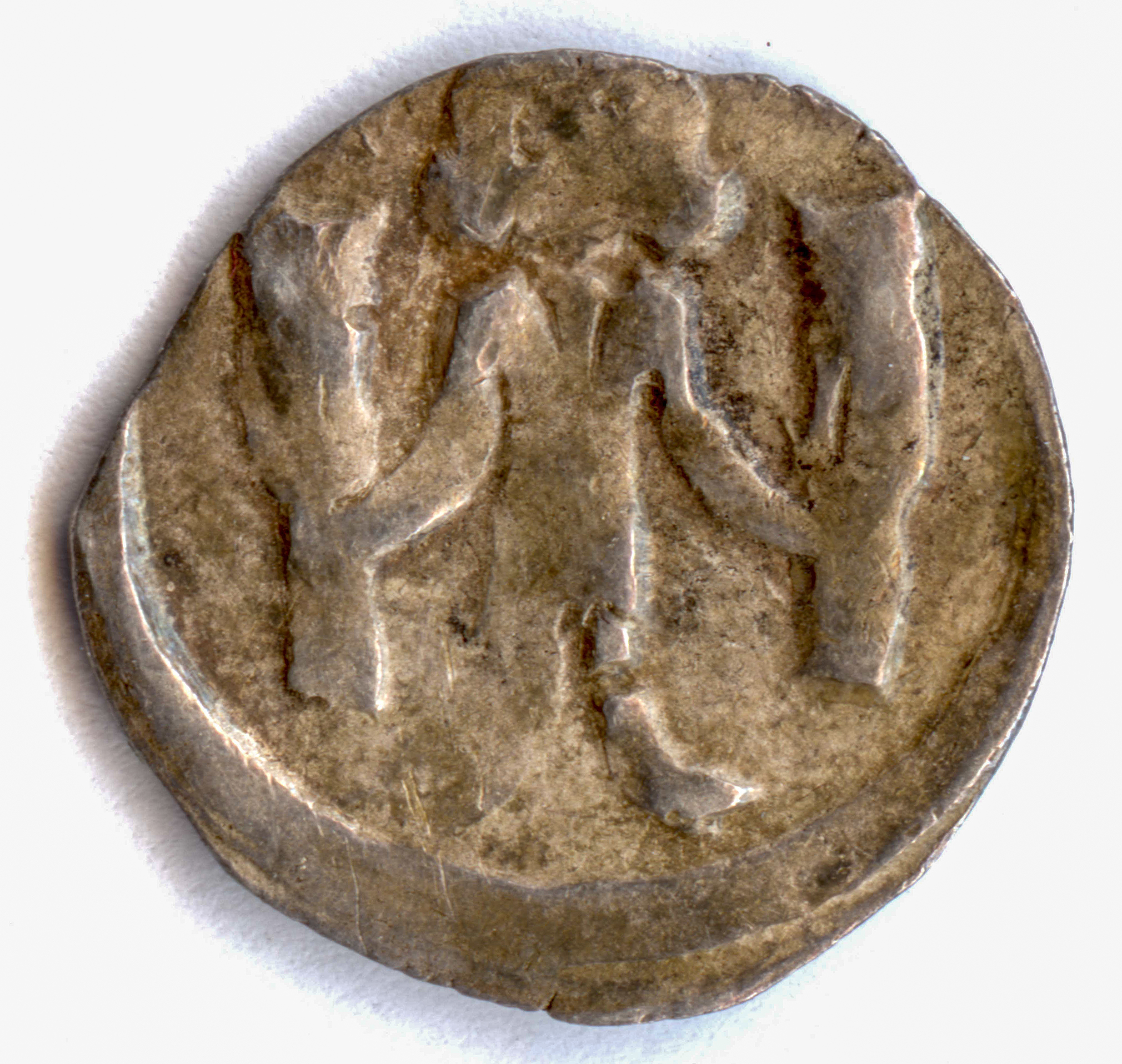
Denarius, ca. 1250

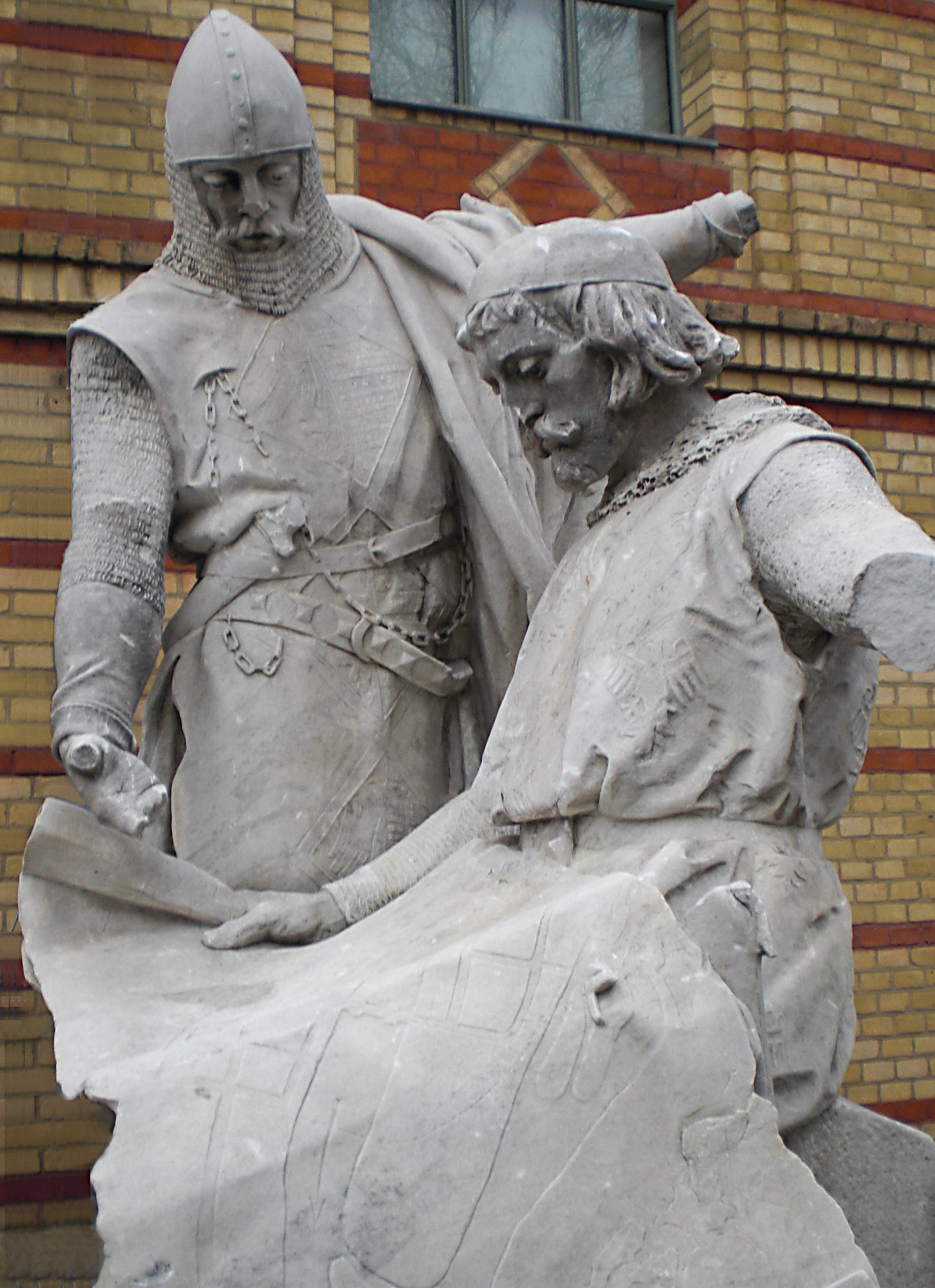
Statue, 1905

Margraves John I and Otto III

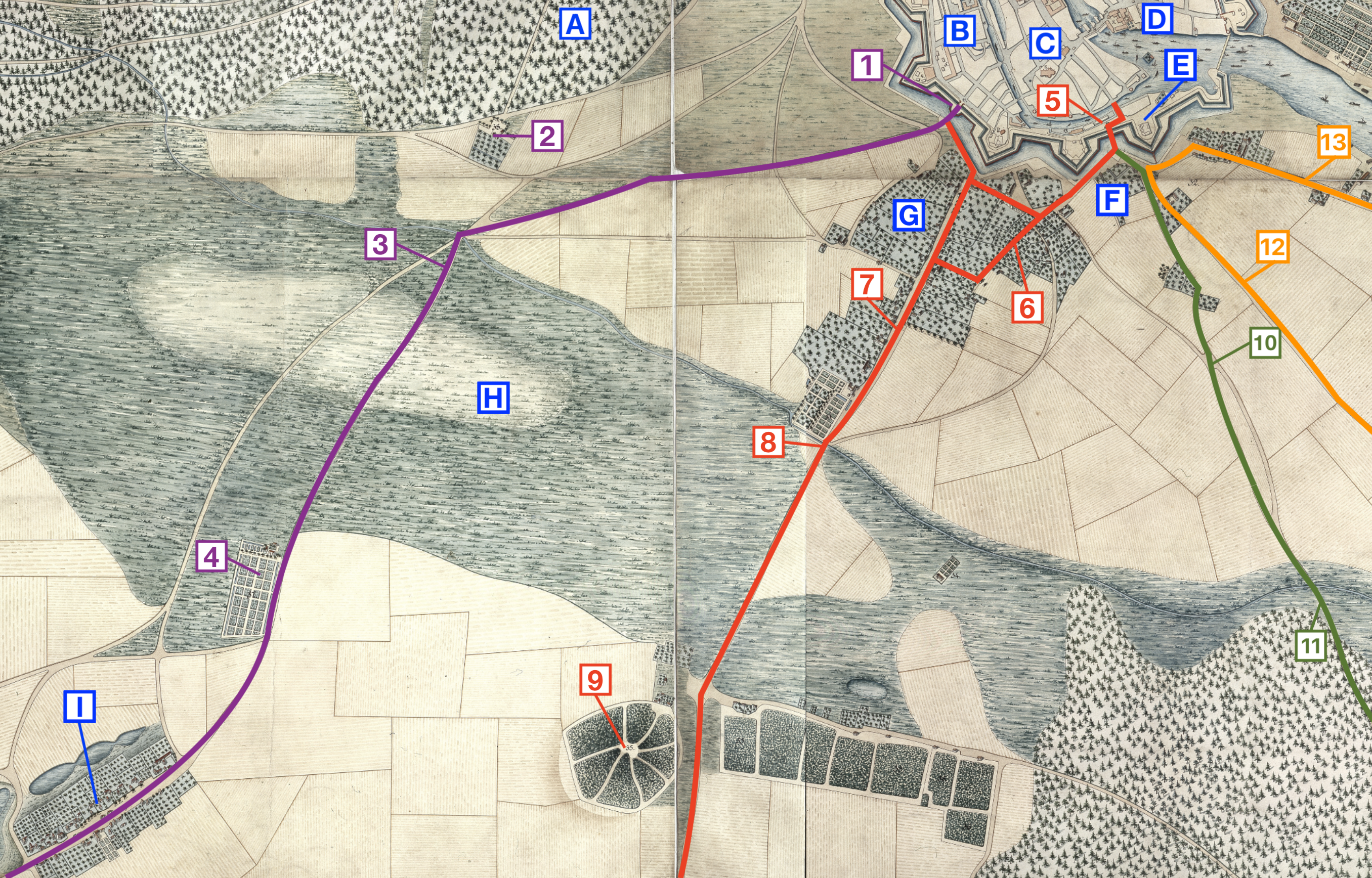
Around the year 1200, a military hamlet, at some point called Richardsdorf, (Note: A proposed alternate earlier toponym (see above) is Richardshof (Richarshove, "Richard's Court"); cf. Heike Schroll, Das Landesarchiv Berlin und seine Bestände: Übersicht der Bestände aus der Zeit bis 1945 (Tektonik-Gruppe A), Berliner Wissenschaftsverlag, Berlin, 2003, p. 134.) was established (Note: Tempelhof and other (sometimes Slavic) villages were founded or conquered around 1190, and the surrounding Teltow region was incorporated in two planned-out phases between 1190 and 1230; cf. Winfried Schich, "Das mittelalterliche Berlin (1237–1411)", in: Wolfgang Ribbe (ed.), Veröffentlichung der Historischen Kommission zu Berlin: Geschichte Berlins. 1. Band, München, 1987, p. 157. The foundation of Richardsdorf was probably part of the second colonization wave, beginning with the year 1200. While Ascanian rule over the Teltow is well attested for that time, there is still debate over who had actually initiated the foundation of the Teltow villages, whether the House of Ascania, or their direct rivals, the bishops of Magdeburg, e.g. Ludolf von Kroppenstedt, or the dukes of Silesia, e.g. Bolesław I the Tall, or the House of Wettin, which would imply a later conquest by the Ascanians and Knights Templar; cf. Ulrich Waack, "Die frühen Herrschaftsverhältnisse im Berliner Raum. Eine neue Zwischenbilanz der Diskussion um die 'Magdeburg-Hypothese'", in: Jahrbuch für brandenburgische Landesgeschichte 54, 2005, pp. 7–38.) together with two unnamed folwarks (Note: The closest folwark was probably situated approximately 500 m (550 yd) southeast of the hamlet near the corner of modern-day Niemetzstraße and Braunschweiger Straße north of the Ringbahn (see 1857 map); the second and more important folwark was established 2.6 km (1.6 mi) east-northeast at the border of the Tempelhof dominion on the western shore of the river Spree across from Stralow in Slavic Trebow, known until the 19th century as the Burgwall ("hill fort"), in modern-day Berlin situated in the Treptower Park on the grounds of the Gasthaus Zenner; cf. Heinz-Dieter Heimann, Klaus Neitmann, Winfried Schich (eds.), Brandenburgisches Klosterbuch – Handbuch der Klöster, Stifte und Kommenden bis zur Mitte des 16. Jahrhunderts, Berlin 2007, Vol. 2, p. 1276. The stronghold's original outer boundary can still be identified by the semicircular modern-day street Böhmische Straße, approx. 300 m (328 yd) from the central meadow, while the size of the later village (see below) was already substantially larger.) at the foot of the Teltow on the edge of the grasslands later known as Cöllnische Wiesen (Cölln Meadows) (Note: In later centuries renamed Berlinische Wiesen (Berlin Meadows); these grasslands were the north-western part of the Mirica, a forest region later known as Cöllnische Heide (Cölln Heath).) on the road to nearby Slavic Trebow and Copenic as an eastern Knights Templar stronghold, (Note: After the era of Jaksa, one of the remaining adversaries of the Ascanian margraviate in the eastern Teltow periphery was the House of Wettin, which had ruled over Copenic since (depending on the source) 1178 or 1210, which required a military presence in Richardsdorf. Therefore, the Templar stronghold was established somewhere between 1190 and 1210. During this time, the Order was under the sovereignty of four consecutive grand masters, Robert IV of Sablé (1191–93), Gilbert Horal (1193–1200), Philippe du Plessis (1201–08) and William of Chartres (1208–19).) administered by the neighboring Commandery Tempelhof (Tempelhove), (Note: A reference to a Templar commander called Hermann (magister Hermannus de Templo, "master [commander] Hermann of the [Knights of the] Temple") dated 29 April 1247 underlines the order's command over Tempelhof and the Teltow region; cf. i.a. Hans Eberhard Mayerm, "Zum Itinerarium peregrinorum – Eine Erwiderung", in: id. (ed.): Kreuzzüge und lateinischer Osten 3, London 1983, p. 210 sq. However, no records exist of the Knights' direct involvement in the foundation of any of the Teltow settlements, including Merghenvelde and Mergendorp, but the 1247 record and later transfer of ownership implies at least their lasting sovereignty.) which had developed during the early days of the Holy Roman Empire close to the old Via Imperii. (Note: Cölln and Berlin region (1685) with Via Imperii The Mediaeval routes including the Via Imperii have been approximately reconstructed in modern times; cf. e.g. Herbert Helbig, Gesellschaft und Wirtschaft der Mark Brandenburg im Mittelalter, Berlin/New York 1973, with fig. 5: "Durchgangsstraßen der Mark Brandenburg im Mittelalter". The imperial road Via Imperii was mainly a trade route and an extension of the ancient Roman Via Raetia through Cölln and Alt-Berlin to Stettin on the Baltic Sea, but it also functioned as one of the Medieval European St. James pilgrims' ways. Within the central and southern parts in the region of modern-day Berlin (see 1685 map), the Via Imperii (3) originated in the oldest suburban district of Friedrichswerder (B) west of Cölln (C), now Fischerinsel in Mitte, and of Alt-Berlin (D): it ran from Cölln's Leipziger Tor (1), first in a western direction passing between the new suburban district Dorotheenstadt in the north and the Leipziger Vorstadt (G) in the south through the fields, which would later be developed into the Friedrichstadt district, until the Strelers-Haus (2), the estate of the wool comber (modern-day Kulturforum) south of the old Thiergarten (A), then southeast through the glacial valley (H) past the Hopfen-Garten (4), and through the village of Schöneberg (I) toward Teltow and Stahnsdorf in the direction of Beelitz and Wittenberg. The modern-day pilgrims' way also covers the newly established stamp station at the Queen Louise Memorial Church, but has abandoned Berlin's historical city center, and instead leads directly north through the western parts of the Großer Tiergarten. The parallel southeastern road, which was of greater importance to the Tempelhof dominion, originated either at the Leipziger Tor (1) or at the Köpenicker Tor (5), leading from Neu-Cölln am Wasser (E) through the Köpenicker Vorstadt (F), later known as Luisenstadt, and the eastern part of the Leipziger Vorstadt (G) roughly along the Sebastian Churchyard and the Cöpnicksche Vorstraße (6), modern-day Alte Jakobstraße; both originating routes then followed the road known today as Lindenstraße (7) southeast through the Hallesches Tor (8) at the Schafgraben, then across the glacial valley, passing east of the Kurfürstlicher Weinberg (9) and leading in a southern direction through Tempelhof, Mariendorf and Marienfelde toward the Ludwigsfelde region. The Köpenicker Tor (5) south of the Roßstraßenbrücke was also the starting point of a third parallel road, which led south toward Rixdorf along the Dresdener Straße (10) and the Ricksdorfscher Damm (11). The two additional southern roads further east both led to Treptow, (13) along the river Spree and (12) through the Köpenicker Vorstadt via modern-day Lausitzer Platz, which, together with the Köpenicker Tor, also played a prominent strategic role in the 1435 Feud of Tempelhof (see below).) The Templar functioned as a neutral institution, and after the primary conflicts had ended in 1231, (Note: Following the victory over the Danes at the second battle of Bornhöved (1227), Brandenburg secured their claim on Pomerania, which Frederick II gave as a suzerainty to the (at this time still dependent) Ascanian margraves, followed by a 1231 treaty between Barnim I of Pomerania-Stettin, due to his young age represented by his regent Samboride mother Miroslava of Pomerelia, and the margraves John I and Otto III, which legally confirmed the Ascanians' dominion i.a. over the Barnim and Teltow, and therefore Richardsdorf, with the region's transfer following in 1237 after the Treaty of Kremmen; at the time the Templar Order was under the sovereignty of grand master Armand de Périgord (1232–44). The subsequent Ascanian-Pomeranian conflicts had no recorded effect on the Tempelhof commandery and the village's political status.) the stronghold was at some point abandoned by the military and rededicated as an agricultural Templar manor, probably after the end of the Teltow and Magdeburg Wars between the Houses of Ascania and Wettin (1239–45), which definitively ended the major regional conflicts of the Ostsiedlung era. (Note: At this time, the Templar Order was under the sovereignty of Richard de Bures, who served as grand master after the capture or death of Armand de Périgord from 1244/45 until his own death on 9 May 1247 during the battle at Lake Tiberias; Marie Luise Bulst-Thiele, Sacrae domus militiae Templi Hierosolymitani magistri – Untersuchung zur Geschichte des Templerordens 1118/19–1314, Göttingen 1974, pp. 211–16 s.v. "17. Richardus (Richart) de Bures. 1144/45 – 9. Mai 1247"; Christian Vogel, Das Recht der Templer, Berlin 2007, pp. 101, 109–11, 118, 124, 353.)

On 21 November 1261, margrave Otto III gifted the forest region Mirica, parts of which would later belong to Rixdorf and Neukölln, to the city of Cölln in what is also the first historical mention of Berlin's aula. Soon after, the heath would be known as Cöllnische Heide, and its western marshes and grasslands as Cöllnische Wiesen. The windmills of Cölln and Alt-Berlin along the river Spree were mentioned for the first time in a document dated 2 January 1285, which also refers to a royal domain office, the Amt Mühlenhof, which would administrate the Bohemian colony Böhmisch-Rixdorf for most of the 18th and 19th century.

When the Knights Templar became too powerful, the order was proscribed and effectively dissolved in 1312 by Pope Clement V under accusations of apostasy, but different from other Templar possessions, the Tempelhof commandery including Richardsdorf did not immediately transfer into Hospitaller ownership, probably because the remaining Knights Templar offered resistance. Instead, the estate was fiducially held by Waldemar the Great for six years, and legally transferred to the Knights Hospitaller only in 1318. (Note: The Johannite Hospitaller history of the commandery was expressly documented for the first time in 1344; after the Reformation, the Catholic Brandenburg Hospitallers evolved into the Protestant Order of Saint John (Johanniterorden), which still exists today.)

== Richardsdorf ==
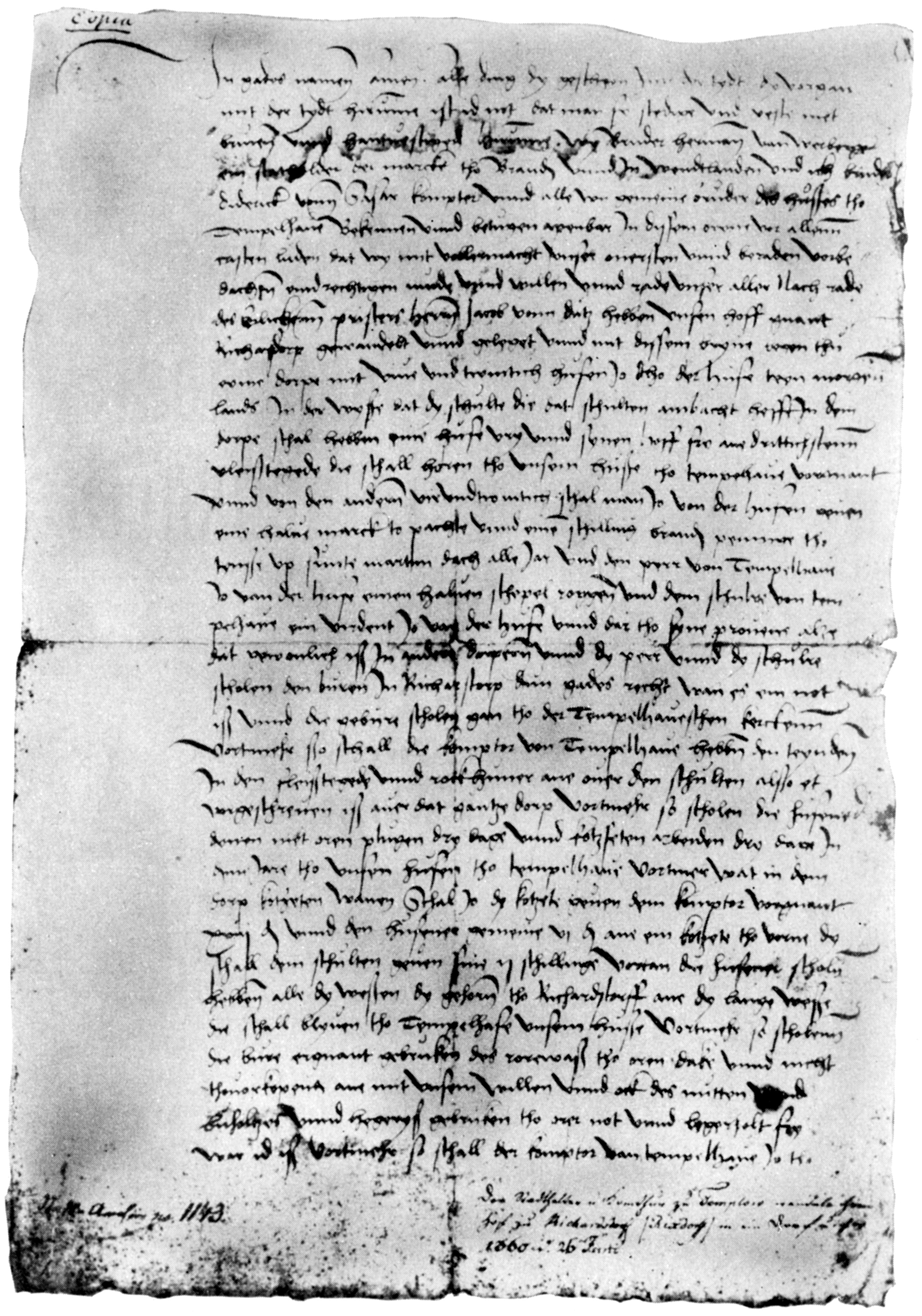
Charter, 1360

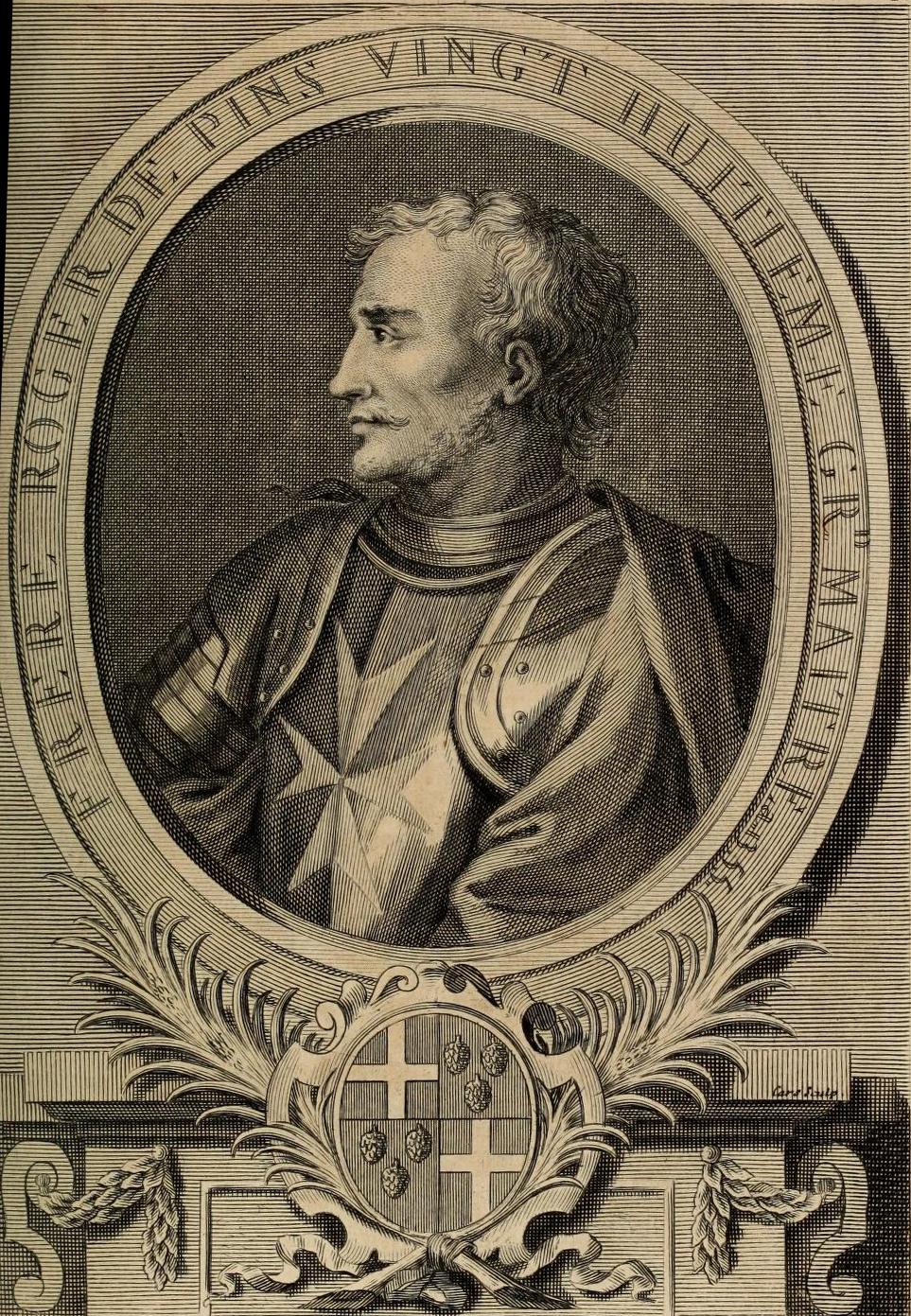
Roger de Pins

Richardsdorf's foundation

When first mentioned in its foundational charter of 26 June 1360, the only known foundational charter for a Brandenburg village, the angerdorf 5.5 km (3.4 mi) south-east of Cölln and Alt-Berlin around the present-day Richardplatz, (Note: Due to the fire of 1578 (see below), the exact locations of the village's original buildings could never be archeologically determined.) and approximately 3 km (1.86 mi) from the river Spree, was already called Richarsdorp (Richardsdorf, German: [rˈɪçaɾtsdˌɔɾf], "Richard's Village"), signifying decades of development from yard (hove) to village (dorp), now officially recognized under the sovereignty of Knights Hospitaller grand master Roger de Pins and the joint Electors of Brandenburg Otto VII and Louis II, and under the regional authority of Hermann von Werberg, Statthalter (Governor) and first Herrenmeister (Lord of the Knights) of the Brandenburg bailiwick. (Note: In the charter, the ultimate (earthly) authorities are only named indirectly as mit Vollmacht unserer Oberen ("authorized by our superiors"); beside Hermann von Werberg (sometimes spelled "Wereberg", "Werberge" or "Werberghe"), the charter also names other representatives of the regional Hospitaller authorities, namely co-founder Dietrich von Sasar, Komtur (Commander) of Tempelhof, Jacob von Detz, the incumbent priest at Tempelhof, as advisor and attestor, as well as other witnesses, e.g. Hans Schuler, the Küster (Sexton) at Tempelhof. The charter already mentions a schultheiß, a municipal magistrate, to be inaugurated. The size of the new village's allocated area was 25 Hufe, i.e. 425.5 ha (4.255 km^{2}) or 1,501.5 acres (2.35 mi^{2}), and it offered a home to 14 families of mostly farmers with (depending on the source) 50 to 100 residents; e.g. "Chronik und Geschichte Neuköllns", Bezirksamt Neukölln.) The historical document containing the Richardsdorf charter, itself a mid-15th century copy of the original deed, has been lost since World War II, but its contents have been preserved, (Note: Cf. e.g. this translation. One striking sentence in the charter foreshadows Rixdorf's and Neukölln's diverse, ephemeral and changeful history; nds.: Alle ding, dy geschyen jn der tydt, dy vorgan mit der tydt. Hirumme ist id not, dat man sy stetige vnd veste met briuen vnd hantuestigen; ger.: Alle Dinge, die in der Zeit geschehen, vergehen mit der Zeit. Darum ist es notwendig, sie stetig zu machen und zu festigen mit Urkunden und Handfestigen; eng.: "All things which occur through time, vanish with time. Therefore, it is necessary to make them steady, and to cement them, in deeds and tangible form".) and 26 June 1360 has since been commemorated as the official date of Neukölln's foundation, (Note: Cf. e.g. the 650-years anniversary edition "Rixdorf – 650 – Neukölln" of Mitteilungen des Vereins für die Geschichte Berlins (Vol. 3, 2010). Other important (and officially recognized) historical festivals are the foundation of Rixdorf's Bohemian village on 31 May 1737, and Rixdorf's independence on 1 April 1899 (see below).) even though the quarter's history dates back at least another 150 years.

The village with its twelve farmers was mentioned again in 1375 as Richardstorpp in the Landbuch der Mark Brandenburg. (Note: The number of farmers is not referenced directly, but was calculated from the appended tribute register.) Around the beginning of the 15th century, Richardsdorf erected its first official chapel. (Note: Richardsdorf's chapel is first mentioned in the 1435 contract between the Hospitallers and the cities of Cölln and Alt-Berlin (see below). The original 1360 charter and later documents attest that the Richardsdorf farmers still belonged to the Tempelhof parish, and the Landbuch does not mention a chapel for the year 1375 either; furthermore, before 1400 the village had to pay tributes to the priest at Tempelhof, which also rules out a separate parish in Richardsdorf during these early times. This would refute a vague secondary source that the chapel already stood long before and even received its church bell as early as 1322; cf. Rixdorf – Britz zur Zeit des Ministers Graf Ewald Friedrich von Hertzberg 1753–1795, Berlin 1949, s.v. "4: Die alte deutsche, jetzt böhm. Kirche auf dem Richardplatz (archived). On the other hand, the foundational charter explicitly orders Richardsdorf's farmers to adhere to the Tempelhof parish; this suggests that the farmers had already constructed their church as a Flurkapelle ("field chapel"), which had never been officially recognized by the parochial authorities.) After ongoing border disputes and an ill-fated armed conflict, (Note: The new leadership over the Teltow by the Johannite Knights Hospitaller perpetuated the Templar rule of force, which i.a. led to continuous strife along the northern border at the Schafgraben, later known as Müllen-Graben, modern-day Landwehr Canal; in 1435 the Hospitaller were accused of having secretly moved boundary stones in the area around the Johannistisch, in modern-day Kreuzberg near the road Am Johannistisch, which prompted the so-called Tempelhofer Fehde (Feud of Tempelhof), as the Hospitaller under the command of Nickel von Colditz launched a military attack against Cölln and Berlin at the Köpenicker Tor near the Roßstraßenbrücke south of Cölln, but their battalion was quickly repelled at the city gates under heavy bombardment, so the Hospitaller decided to retreat toward Richardsdorf, pursued by Cölln's forces, but were ambushed from behind by Cölln's and Berlin's cavalry in the area of modern-day Lausitzer Platz, so they fled across the Schafgraben or the Schlangengraben into their own domain, possibly into the western part of the Richardsdorf lot, where they were defeated before dusk; cf. Frank Eberhardt, "Verziert mit Ross und Meerjungfrauen: Die Roßstraßenbrücke im Bezirk Mitte", Berlinische Monatsschrift 4, p. 11 sq., Berlin 2001; Werner von Westhafen, "Die Tempelhofer Fehde", Kreuzberger Chronik 174, November 2015.) the Knights Hospitaller were forced to sell their possessions into permanent fiefdom to the cities of Alt-Berlin and Cölln on 23 September 1435, including Richardsdorf. (Note: With 2,440 schock Prague groschen (approx. $500,000 in 2024), the selling price was rather high, but it calmed regional relations and enabled the Hospitaller to purchase the lands around the village of Schwiebus.)

== Ricksdorf ==
The village was mentioned again in deeds of 1525 as Ricksdorf, for the first time officially in its modern contracted form. On 1–2 November 1539, margrave Joachim II converted to the teachings of Martin Luther, and the Reformation was introduced in Ricksdorf. (Note: Already in 1521, the councils, guilds and schools of Berlin had absented themselves from Roman processions like Corpus Christi.) Disputes over Ricksdorf continued between Cölln and Berlin, (Note: Cölln and Berlin had formed an administrative unity in 1432, but the despotism of Margrave Frederick Irontooth in the 1440s with the ensuing Berliner Unwille (lit. "the reluctance of Berlin") had resulted i.a. in the annulment of the shared administration, which soured relations over many generations, and complicated their joint fiefdom over Richardsdorf (Ricksdorf).) and with a compromise settlement Ricksdorf became the sole fief and a kämmereidorf (treasury village) of Cölln on 24 August 1543. (Note: The contract was signed on 4 January 1543; Herbert Schwenk, 2001, "Alle ding… vorgan mit der tydt – Die Verwandlungen von Rixdorf und Neukölln", Berlinische Monatsschrift 4, pp. 43–50, Berlin 2001.) The documents of 1543 already mention a tavern at the crossing of the postal and trade road through Ricksdorf to Mittenwalde and the Ricksdorfscher Damm, modern-day Kottbusser Damm, which in 1737 became Rixdorf's famous tavern Rollkrug at Hermannplatz. On 2 February 1546, the right to inaugurate priests in Tempelhof and Ricksdorf was transferred to the parishes of Cölln and Berlin. On 14 April 1578, a fire destroyed most of the village's original infrastructure. Ricksdorf then created Die alte Kufe ("the old trough"), a small pond on the central meadow on Richardplatz, which was not only used as a horse pond, but primarily as a Feuerkufe, a reservoir for the new fire hose.

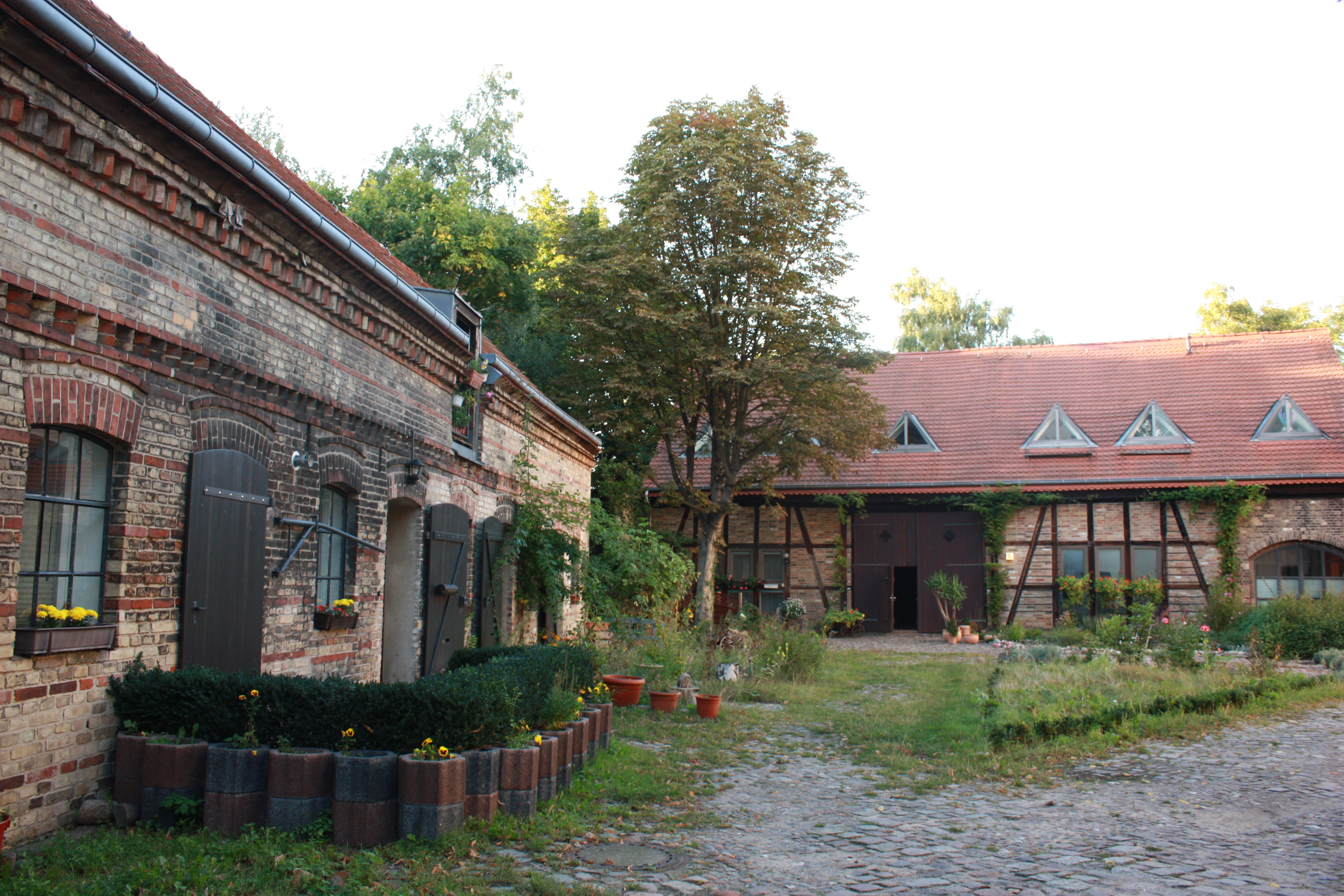
Historical forge, Richardplatz, Rixdorf, 1624 (first mention)

In 1624 the population had grown to 150, (Note: The village's tax register lists 12 farmers, 8 cotters (Kossäten), a herdsman and his serf, a blacksmith, and two pairs of domestic serfs.) and the village had built a forge for traveling blacksmiths, which after several renovations and enlargements remains in operation to this day as Berlin's oldest forge, the Schmiede am Richardplatz. During the Thirty Years' War (1618–48) (Note: See also Swedish Pomerania.) Ricksdorf was mostly depopulated, with buildings and parts of the chapel destroyed by fire. (Note: The chapel's roof and spire were destroyed in 1639, but rebuilt the same year; in 1912 the chapel was renamed Bethlehem Church. Many parts of today's church building have preserved the original late Gothic architecture of 15th century Margraviate churches.) At the end of the war, the village was also plagued by the Black Death, and in 1652 only seven farmers and cotters (Kossäten) and their relatives remained. In 1650, the Great Elector Frederick William gifted Ricksdorf its first windmill. In 1678, he created a hares' garden in the forest Hasenheide. The first mention of a village tavern (Dorfkrug) at the central Richardplatz is found in the town's oldest preserved court report from 29 January 1685. (Note: The tavern was located at Richardplatz 16, later known as Zum Goldenen Adler (1840) and Winkelmanns Salon (1872), and also functioned as a venue for the Friedrich-Wilhelm-Städtisches Theater, until the original building was torn down in 1889; a newer Gründerzeit building was constructed in its place, which now houses the bar Herr Lindemann (2024).) The first mention of a school in Ricksdorf is from the year 1688, when the local authorities deposed the schoolmaster. (Note: The school building was situated on Richardplatz, next to the village pond Die alte Kufe.) On 26 June 1693, Ricksdorf's chapel left the Tempelhof parish and joined the Britz parish, and the village's first parish register was opened by incumbent priest Johann Guthke. On 29 November 1700, the first official brewery concession and distribution rights were granted to Johann Wolfgang Bewert, the proprietor of Ricksdorf's schultheiß court.

== Rixdorf ==
On 17 January 1709, the old city of Cölln merged with Alt-Berlin, Friedrichswerder, Friedrichstadt and Dorotheenstadt, forming the Königliche Haupt- und Residenzstadt Berlin (Royal Capital and Seat Berlin). At the time, Ricksdorf was already spelled Rixdorf in several documents, and when Berlin's new municipal constitution came into effect on 1 January 1710, Rixdorf became a treasury village of the Berlin magistracy. In 1712, the new postal, trade and military road from Berlin to Dresden, the Dresdener Heerstraße, today's Hermannstraße, opened south of Hermannplatz as an extension of the Ricksdorfscher Damm. On 28 September 1717, the royal administration introduced general compulsory schooling in Berlin, Rixdorf and the rest of Prussia. Rixdorf financed the construction of its first windmill in 1729, (Note: It joined the preexisting windmill, which had been gifted to the village by the Crown (see above), with another royal gift to the Bohemian village following in 1765 (see below). All in all, Rixdorf would have 16 windmills, two royal gifts, the 1729 windmill, and 13 additional windmills constructed between 1737 and 1865, two of them in today's Reuterkiez, and the rest on the Rollberge.) and five years later the population had grown to 224.

=== Deutsch-Rixdorf and Böhmisch-Rixdorf ===
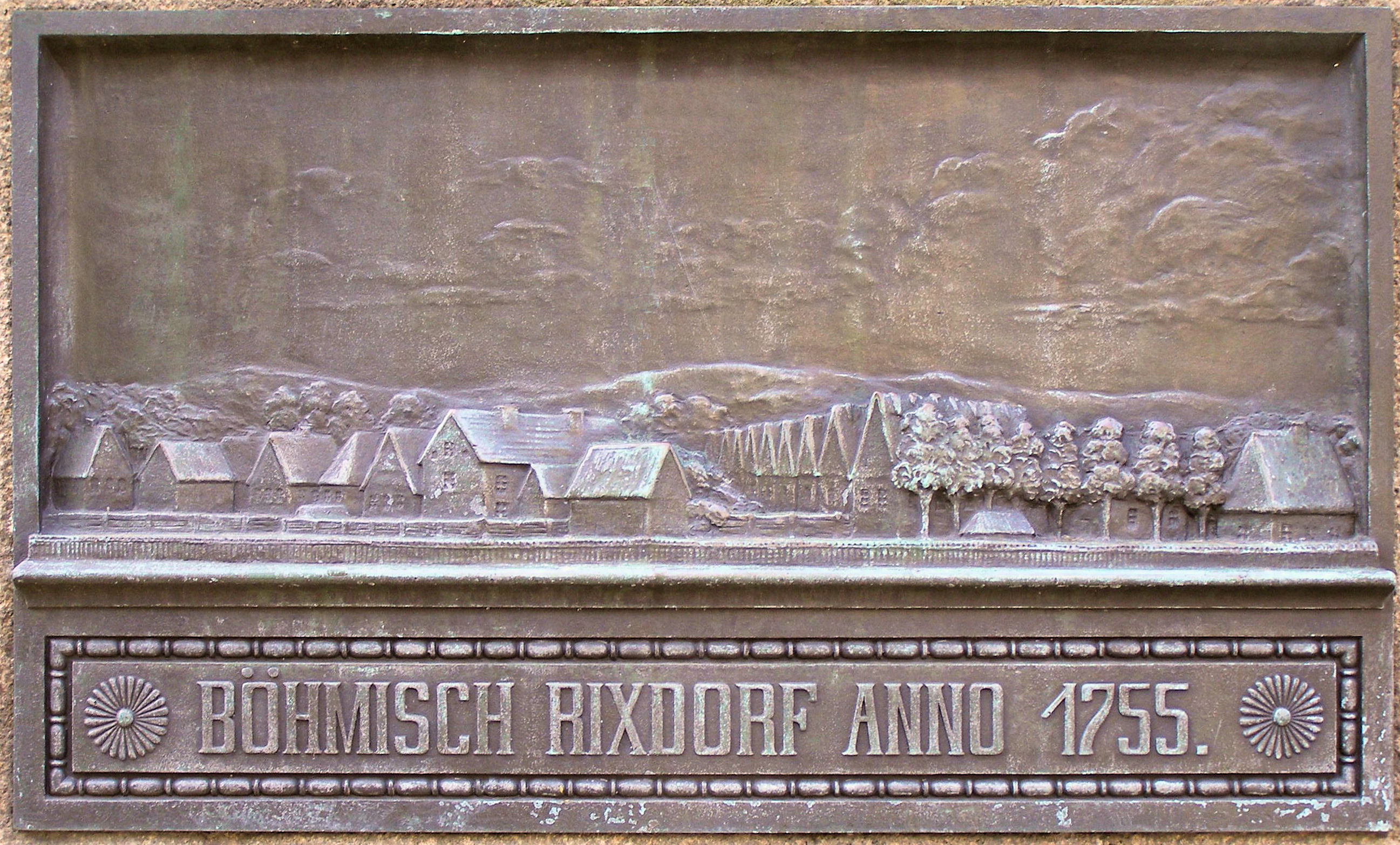
Böhmisch-Rixdorf and Rollberge, 1755

In 1737, King Frederick William I of Prussia invited 18 families of Hussite Moravian Protestants, who had been driven out of Bohemia, to settle near the village, (Note: Bohemia became primarily catholic again after the Battle of White Mountain, which led to persecutions of the Protestant minorities, many of whom subsequently left the country. Most of Rixdorf's Hussite settlers were part of a group of 700 refugees, 500 of whom had originally fled to Saxon Gerlachsheim near Marklissa, modern-day Gmina Leśna, from the regions around the villages of Landskron, Leitomischl, Rothwasser and Hermanitz in Roman northern Moravia and north-eastern Bohemia; when Joseph Wenzel I, the Regent of Liechtenstein, guardian of Prince Johann Nepomuk Karl and manorial lord of Rothwasser as part of the Gundakarian Majorat, demanded the repatriation of his serfs, to which the Saxon government consented, 300 Bohemians fled again to Prussian Cottbus in the winter of 1736/37 under the guidance of their priest Augustin Schulz; when the landlord of Gerlachsheim confiscated the possessions of the 200 Bohemians, who had stayed behind, as compensation for the loss of much of his workforce, the remaining Bohemians migrated to Cottbus in February 1737, where they eventually met up with 200 more Bohemian refugees; their settlement in the Berlin region including Rixdorf was granted shortly afterwards at the behest of Bohemian priest Johann Liberda, who in the same year had managed to flee to Berlin from Waldheim Prison, where he had been incarcerated for sedition since late 1732. Liberda had already been a central figure of the first Bohemian immigration wave; as leader of a Bohemian delegation in the fall of 1732, he had managed to persuade the (initially reluctant) King to grant asylum to the first 500 refugees, who had originally fled to Großhennersdorf near Herrnhut in Upper Lusatia, ruled by lady of the manor Baroness Catharina von Gersdorff, who was an early patroness of the Moravian Church of Herrnhut, but were suffering from harsh serfdom and diminishing income due to subsequent immigration; after experiencing the Bohemians' proficiency, the King's mistrust changed into consistent support, which paved the way for Rixdorf's Bohemian settlement. Cf. Otmar Liegl, "250 Jahre Böhmen in Berlin", Mitteilungen des Vereins für die Geschichte Berlins 79 (1), Berlin 1983, pp. 2–15 (5 sq.).) where they built new houses, industrial infrastructure (Note: The Königliche Domänenverwaltung (Royal Domain Administration) bought five Hufe of farmland including Rixdorf's fiefdom court of the schultheiß and the yard belonging to Adolph Manitius, the court's proprietor (1704–37); the plots were then assigned as emphyteutic leases and transferred to the new settlers for later services to Berlin's industrialists; the Crown also provided construction materials and the necessary industrial and agricultural equipment free of charge, and helped in the construction of nine duplex houses with barns for the families, whereas each two families received between 12 and 14 morgen of land for gardening and agriculture; many of the barns received chambers for later subtenant worker families. The Bohemian settlers were exempt from military service, received immunity from taxes for five years, and the Crown carried their rents for two years; they were granted free citizenship and the right to master craftsmanship. The court of the schultheiß remained under Bohemian administration until 1874.) and eventually their own chapels (Note: Overall, the Bohemian immigrants formed three distinct parishes, a traditional Moravian, a Bohemian-Lutheran, and a Reformed Bohemian Protestant, whose relations were at times strained by religious controversies, especially in the early 19th century. Construction of a Moravian oratory on the Kirchgasse began in 1750 and was finished in 1761 (Herrnhuter Brüdergemeine), but the building was destroyed in World War II and reopened as a late-modernist oratory and parish hall, inaugurated by bishop Otto Dibelius on 13 May 1962; church services in the oratory were held in the Czech language until shortly before World War I. The Reformed Protestant parish settled on Richardstraße with the inauguration of their first priest Johann Theophil Elsner on 23 October 1747. The original chapel in Deutsch-Rixdorf east of Richardplatz remained the main church of both Rixdorf villages; it was at first used by both the original German Catholics and newly immigrated Bohemian Protestants, and only later became an exclusively Protestant church.) off the village center along the road to Berlin, today called Richardstraße. 31 May 1737 is regarded as the official date of the Bohemian village's foundation, although the first settlers had already arrived in Rixdorf on 25 March of the same year. Twenty more colonists were granted their own land and construction rights in 1748. In 1751, the new settlement received its own cemetery, the Böhmischer Gottesacker. In 1753, the oldest school building of Neukölln was constructed on the Bohemian Kirchgasse, (Note: The Kirchgasse was originally called Mala ulicka, Czech for "narrow alley", a name in use until 1909. The old school is one of the few buildings that survived the fire of 1849. A representation of the Hussite Protestants' common chalice can be found in the building's pediment. Today, the building houses a museum of local history.) which from 1797 onward also housed the village's assembly hall. Rixdorf suffered from destruction and pillaging by Austrian and Russian troops during the second year of the Seven Years' War (1756–63), but this did not prevent its subsequent development. In 1760, Berlin statesman Ewald Friedrich von Hertzberg became the proprietor of Rixdorf's Schulzengericht (schultheiß court). The original village of Rixdorf was further expanded in 1764 with new residential buildings and a brickyard, and since 1801 it was mostly called Deutsch-Rixdorf. In 1765, Frederick the Great gifted Böhmisch-Rixdorf its first windmill. In spite of its expansion, Deutsch-Rixdorf at first remained the smaller of the two villages, with roughly 200 residents in 1771, while the new Bohemian village Böhmisch-Rixdorf (Note: The Czech-speaking Moravian refugees and their descendants called it Český Rixdorf; the Czech lingual culture in Böhmisch-Rixdorf remained prominent until the beginning of the 19th century.) had counted 300 residents already in 1747.

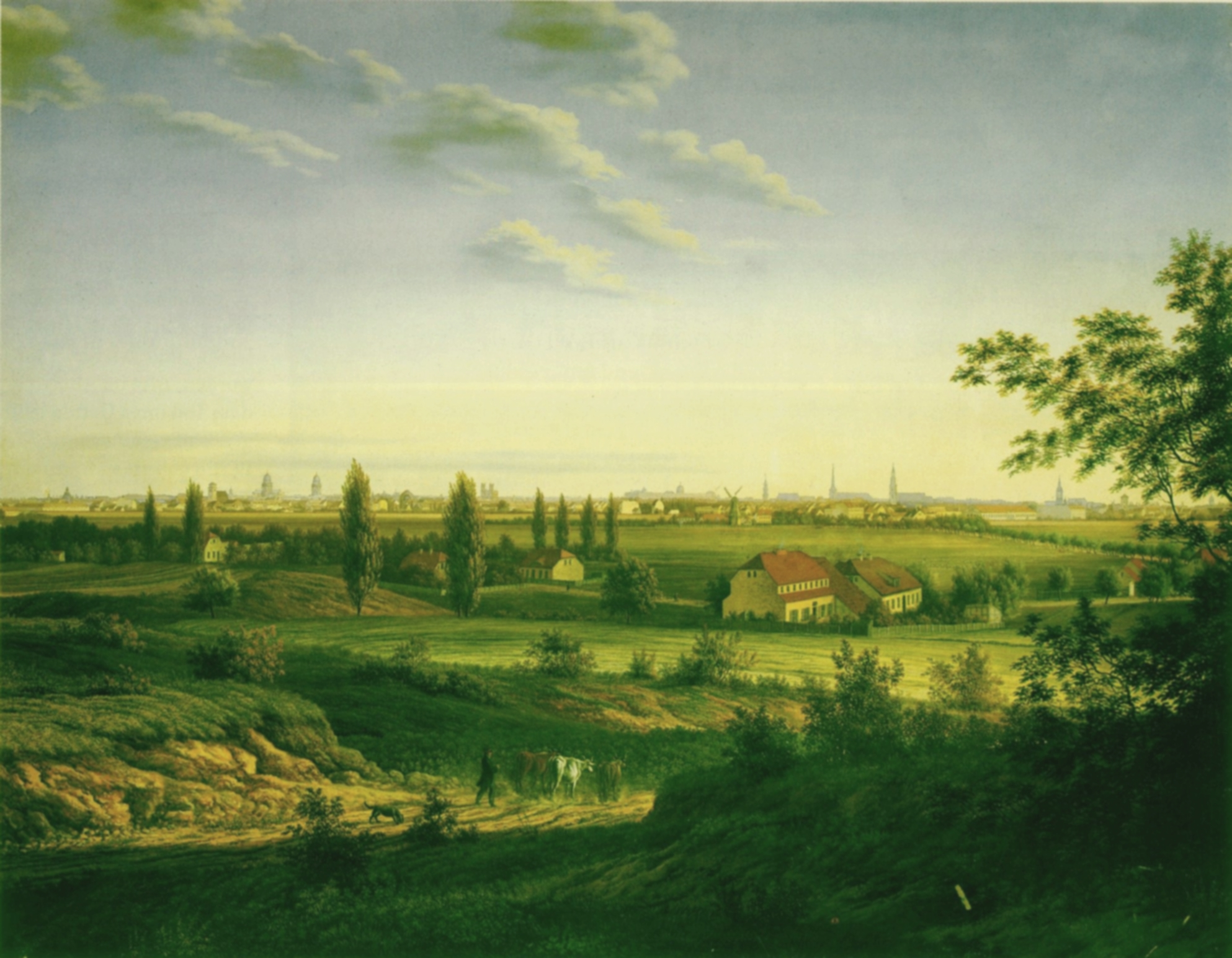
View of the Hasenheide, Cölln and Alt-Berlin from the Rollberge, with Rollkrug and Ricksdorfscher Damm, ca. 1834

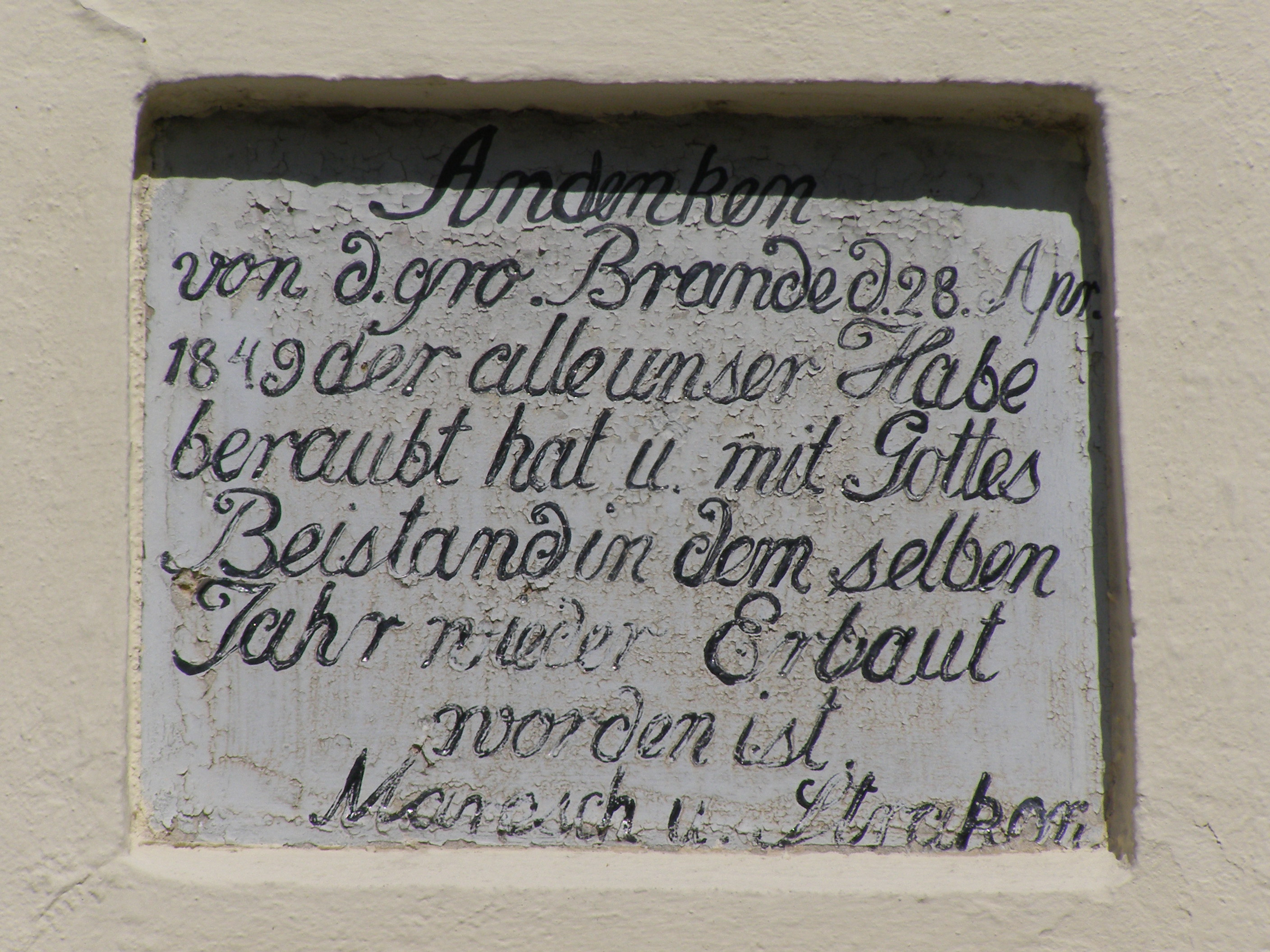
Memorial for the fire of 1849, Böhmisch-Rixdorf

In 1797, Böhmisch-Rixdorf was granted its own administration, and the two villages settled on the official modern spelling Rixdorf, which had been in use since 1709. In the same year, Deutsch-Rixdorf acquired the forge on Richardplatz and sold it to a local resident, who was therefore allowed to operate the forge permanently, which until then had been prevented by the Berlin blacksmiths' guild to stifle competition. The French Army under Napoleon occupied Rixdorf in 1806. The overall population in 1809 was 695. In 1811, Germany's first public outdoor gymnasium was established in the Hasenheide forest by Turnvater Jahn. The Hasenheide itself temporarily became a Regierungsbezirk of Berlin (governmental district) from 1816 to 1821, before coming under Rixdorf's jurisdiction. Rixdorf residents fought in the 1813 Wars of Liberation, for example at the Battle of Großbeeren, and the subsequent sovereign and political liberty, also gained from the Prussian abolition of serfdom on 11 November 1810, laid the foundation for Rixdorf's rapid development and industrialization, which began in the early second half of the 19th century. In 1827, the street to Berlin was paved, and by 1830 Rixdorf had already become the largest village of the Berlin periphery with more than 2,000 inhabitants. On 28 April 1849, more than a quarter of the buildings in both Rixdorf villages were destroyed in a firestorm, (Note: Almost all of Rixdorf's buildings suffered damage, but the worst destruction was to the Bohemian part; the fire started, when a worker named Karl Kuschke unsuccessfully tried to shoot a pair of storks nesting on the rooftop of a farmer's barn, which ignited the thatched roof, and the fire spread through the village in a matter of hours; Kuschke was acquitted only because the town, already burdened by the costs of reconstruction, would have had to support the perpetrator's family; "Knapp daneben: Was im Böhmischen Dorf als Inferno endete", Facetten-Magazin Neukölln, 28 April 2016; cf. Manfred Motel, "Das Böhmische Dorf in Berlin", Studia Comeniana et historica 38 (79), 2008, pp. 635–656 (645 sq.).) and reconstruction lasted until 1853. (Note: Two other large fires had already occurred in 1803 (on Richardplatz) and 1827, all of which accelerated the Gründerzeit development phase; conversely, many older places were forever lost to history, especially most of the older Bohemian settlement; see below for the Reuterkiez firestorm of 1886.) Around 1850, both Rixdorf villages had begun to extend their residential areas to the north and northeast, and these Neucöllner Siedlungen (Neukölln Estates) reached all the way to the emerging industrial lots at the newly constructed Landwehr Canal.

On 1 January 1853, the parish of Deutsch-Rixdorf was declared an independent parish by the Berlin Evangelical Consistory. In 1854, the first horse-drawn omnibus connection was established between Berlin and the two Rixdorf villages, followed by the first regular bus line from Hermannplatz to Berlin since 1 May 1860, the Ringbahn launch on 17 July 1871, and an additional bus line from Bergstraße, today's Karl-Marx-Straße, to Hallesches Tor in 1876. Meanwhile, the construction of new streets, plazas and residential estates in the Berlin periphery had been set in motion as part of the 1862 Hobrecht-Plan, which created what would come to be known architecturally as the Wilhelmine Ring. In 1865, Rixdorf's most prominent men's gymnastic club was founded, the MTV Vater Jahn Rixdorf, which still exists today as TuS Neukölln 1865. (Note: In 1912, the club became a gymnastic club for all genders and was renamed TV Jahn Neukölln 1865. The club's modern name was chosen after merging with the Neuköllner TV Friesen 1887 and the VfL Märkische Union Neukölln 1926 in 1947. Today, the club operates from the borough's sports campus Efeuweg (Gropiusstadt). One of its basketball training centers is still in Rixdorf, today at the Albert Schweitzer High School, and its youth division has fostered many local talents like Jan Jagla and Jack Kayil.) In 1866, the Rixdorf villages were hit by epidemics of cholera and smallpox with at least 170 fatalities. In 1867, Deutsch-Rixdorf had a population of approximately 5,000, and Böhmisch-Rixdorf of 1,500. In 1870 the villages received their first train station, the Bahnhof Rixdorf, which still exists today as Neukölln station. (Note: It was constructed together with a pedestrian overpass, which the people called Der Galgen ("the gallows"); the overpass was eventually torn down in November 1895 as part of the station's reconstruction.) On 10 August 1872, the original Jahndenkmal memorial for Turnvater Jahn was inaugurated in the Hasenheide forest. On 13 December 1872, Berlin's administration merged both Rixdorf villages and the commune Britz into the 24th Amtsbezirk (bailiwick).

=== Unification ===
Both villages were united as Rixdorf on 1 January 1874 by royal decree of 11 July 1873, (Note: The decree was first published on 31 July 1873; cf. Amtsblatt der Königlichen Regierung zu Potsdam und der Stadt Berlin, Potsdam 1873, p. 230, s.v. No. 130. For many decades Böhmisch-Rixdorf had resisted plans for unification; the Gesetz über die Landgemeinde-Verfassungen (Law on the Constitution of rural Communes) of 14 April 1856 created the legal basis for the 1871 establishment of the two Rixdorf municipal councils, which paved the way for more cooperation and eventually unification. The principal municipal magistrate in charge of Böhmisch-Rixdorf, who had conducted the unification affairs on the Bohemian side, was Carl Friedrich Barta, who had been in office since the formation of the councils in 1871, and he remained a municipal magistrate under Boddin from 1874 to 1882; the Bartas had been one of Neukölln's most prominent families, among the very first Bohemian settlers of 1737.) and the new town became a municipality of the Kreis Teltow. On 4 February 1874, Hermann Boddin became the first principal municipal magistrate (Amts- und Gemeindevorsteher) of the unified Rixdorf. (Note: Beside Carl Barta, the Bohemian aldermen Wilhelm Jansa and Daniel Maresch, both municipal administrators, functioned as Boddin's deputies.) For the next decades, Boddin would conduct Rixdorf's evolution into the fastest-growing and eventually largest village of the Prussian monarchy with 90,000 residents in 1895, which also created a poverty gap and social problems. Boddin's responsibilities were immense, and he soon fought for an equalization of burdens, and for Rixdorf's admission into the Greater Berlin city alliance. He became known as an upright and resilient, though also dominant and self-centered patriarch, but was still venerated by Rixdorf's officials and citizens alike.

The inaugural meeting of Rixdorf's municipal committee commenced on 27 April 1874 at the old schultheiß court on Richardplatz. In 1874, Rixdorf had 12,300 inhabitants, growing to 15,328 the next year, mainly due to thousands of new residents, who since 1870 had been immigrating from Pomerania, Silesia and other primarily Eastern regions of the German Empire as far as East Prussia, looking for work in the town's growing industry, a migration wave that would not significantly weaken until the year 1910. One of the more important early ordinances of 1874 was to revoke the herding warrant for the Berlinische Wiesen, formerly called Cöllnische Wiesen, which created a large area for residential developments, among them an expansion of the Neucöllner Siedlungen (Neucölln Estates), whose name later inspired the city's renaming to Neukölln.

Rixdorf's first daily newspaper, the Gemeinnütziger Anzeiger (Charitable Gazette), was published since 1874, later reestablished as Rixdorfer Zeitung (Rixdorf Newspaper) by editor-in-chief Wilhelm Hecht in 1882. The city's first telegraph station opened the same year. On 1 October 1874, the Vereinsbrauerei, which had been founded in 1872 and would later become Berlin's Kindl brewery, opened to the public in Rollberg after almost a year of unofficial pourage. Urbanization quickly took off with new residential estates, schools, churches, infrastructure, paved streets with sewers, and an increasing number of industrial settlements. The first Kremser omnibus line to Berlin started its operations on 2 July 1875 under private management. The city's first gasworks and the original Amtshaus (administrative building) were built in 1878, the first municipal court (Amtsgericht) in 1879, which was quickly replaced in 1901 by the new municipal court and prison, (Note: The prison on Schönstedtstraße later became Neukölln's youth detention center until its closure in 1991. Local residents often called it the Café Schönstedt (Fabian Friedmann, "Der sitzt im Café Schönstedt…", Neuköllner, 20 June 2011).) and the city's new telegraph office in 1882. Rixdorf's first public open-air bath opened in 1883 south of the Ringbahn, but had to close again in 1913, when Neukölln's harbor and docklands were built. On 14 August 1884, Richardplatz was hit by a large fire. On 6 November 1884, Rixdorf sold its old village chapel to the Bohemian-Lutheran parish for 6,300 silver mark, approximately $31,800 (2024).

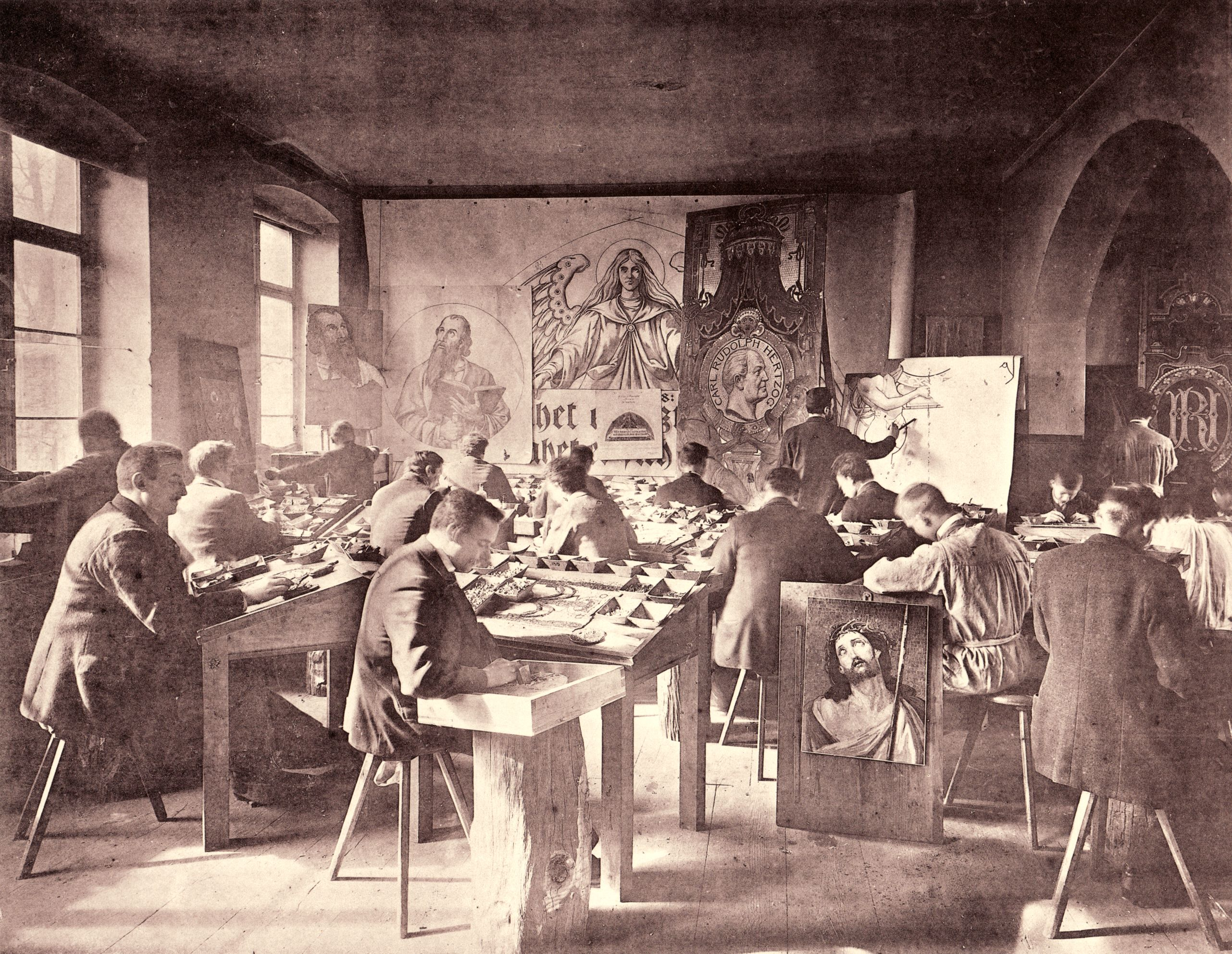
Glass mosaic compositor hall, Puhl & Wagner, Rixdorf, 1897

In 1873, Rixdorf had already had 8 paved streets, and 24 in 1876, which grew exponentially in the following decade, enabling additional bus lines to Berlin, followed by the introduction of the first tram lines, beginning in 1884 with the so-called Pferde-Eisenbahn from Rollberg to Spittelmarkt in Berlin, and a communal line from the Rollkrug tavern at Hermannplatz to Knesebeckstraße near Kurfürstendamm a year later, which formed the basis for the Straßenbahnen der Stadt Berlin (SSB), the first communal public transportation company of Berlin, which was established with grants from the Rixdorf citizenry. On 20 March 1892, the first issue of the daily newspaper Rixdorfer Tageblatt (Daily Rixdorf) was published, renamed Neuköllner Tageblatt in 1912. The city's infrastructure continued to grow with the introduction of a telephone network in 1885, the first public telephone installation at Rixdorf's post office in 1886, a new water network connection to the Charlottenburg waterworks in 1887–88, a new sewage system and drainage facility between 1891 and 1895, the building of a new inner-city hospital, a community hall and a poorhouse in 1893, the 1895 reconstruction of Rixdorf station, and the 1899 opening of Hermannstraße station on the Ringbahn. On 1 October 1897, local teacher Emil Fischer (1865–1932) founded the Naturhistorisches Schulmuseum (School Museum of Natural History), the precursor to the Museum Neukölln, in the old school building on Hohenzollernplatz, today's Karl-Marx-Platz, to counter the social and educational deficits of Rixdorf's working class. On 9 February 1899, the first electric tram line began its operation.

=== Independence ===
Rixdorf's 1899 independence was executed in two legal steps. On 1 April, the town was chartered as an independent city and released from the Kreis Teltow, (Note: Voted on by the Brandenburg Provincial Assembly on 30 January 1899; the sum of acquittance to the Kreis Teltow was 1 million gold mark (approx. $27.8 million in 2024). Today, Rixdorf's independence day is still regarded as an important date in Neukölln's history.) and Hermann Boddin immediately transitioned into his new office as the city's mayor. Rixdorf then declared itself a free city (Kreisfreie Stadt) on 1 May, and Boddin received the official title Erster Bürgermeister auf Lebenszeit (First Mayor for Life) from district president Robert Earl Hue de Grais on 4 May. On 1 November, the city obtained its own police force and law enforcement agency, including a criminal investigation unit, with the first precinct established on Hermannstraße south of Hermannplatz. At year's end, Rixdorf's population stood at 90,422.

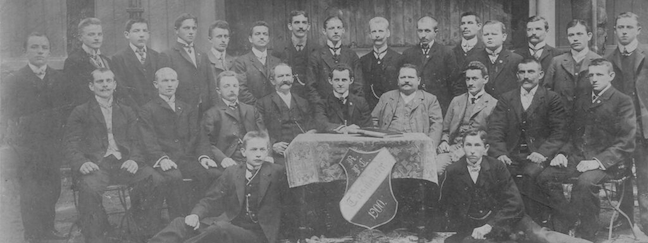
Foundation of Tasmania 1900

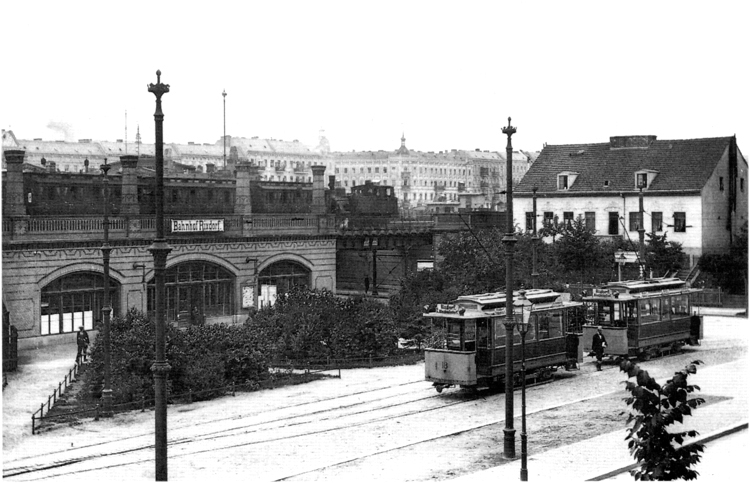
Rixdorf Station, 1901

Rixdorf's only professional association football club, Rixdorfer TuFC Tasmania, was officially founded on 2 June 1900, but might have been active already since 1890. (Note: It is unknown, whether the club was a continuation of the Berliner FC Tasmania, an earlier Rixdorf football club, which had been founded in 1890; Tasmania 1900 was rebranded several times, to Rixdorfer FC Tasmania 1900 in 1907, Neuköllner SC Tasmania (1912), SG Neukölln-Mitte (1946), and finally to SC Tasmania 1900 Berlin in 1949 until its dissolution in 1973 (see below). Other historical lower-league football clubs of Rixdorf and Neukölln are Rixdorfer FC Normannia (1895), Rixdorfer SC Südstern (1908), first youth club of Neukölln native and German national Christian Ziege, VfB Neukölln (1912), first youth club of Neukölln native and German national Antonio Rüdiger, Sport-Vereinigung Hellas Neukölln (1917), and Neuköllner FC Arsenal (1932).) On 17 December 1900, the last Pferde-Eisenbahn of Rixdorf was converted to electric operation, while the omnibus lines continued to be horse-drawn at first. The new city received its coat of arms in 1903, and its population quickly grew to 237,289 in 1910. It was during this boomtown era that the architect Reinhold Kiehl was called on by Rixdorf's assembly to further upgrade the city's infrastructure, which led to some of the quarter's most iconic buildings and locations being constructed, such as the city hall (Rathaus Neukölln) between 1905 and 1908, which gradually replaced the older Amtshaus, (Note: The original Amtshaus was eventually destroyed in World War II; Susanne Schilp, "Das Rathaus hatte einen Vorläufer, der von einer Bombe getroffen wurde", Berliner Woche, 17 March 2018.) the 1912 Stadtbad Neukölln, a public bath house, and many more after 1912 like the Körnerpark and its orangerie. (Note: Wolfgang Krawczynski, Architekt Reinhold Kiehl, Stadtbaurat in Rixdorf bei Berlin – Biographie, Werkverzeichnis, Beiträge, Berlin 1987. Internationally, however, Rixdorf's architecture was of little importance at the time; cf. Hugh Chisholm (ed.), The Encyclopædia Britannica, ed. 11, vol. 23, Cambridge 1911, p. 388, col. 1, s.v. "Rixdorf": "It contains no public buildings of any interest […].") The Rixdorf Harbor in the southern part of the city was built between 1900 and 1906 together with the Teltow Canal, the Britz Canal and the Britz Harbor. The first stage of the harbor's watergate was constructed in 1902, at first used as part of a drainage facility for the surrounding wetlands. In the north, the Landwehr Canal was extended eastward between 1902 and 1905 with the Rixdorfer Stichkanal (Rixdorf Branch Canal) to the city's new gasworks, replacing the old Wiesengraben (Meadow Trench), which had originally been called Schlangengraben (Snake Trench). The year 1909 saw the inauguration of Rixdorf's first municipal hospital (Rixdorfer Krankenhaus), situated outside of the city near modern-day Buckow. (Note: The new hospital was built to relieve Teltow's preexisting hospital in Britz, and the two eventually merged in the 1990s.) By 1911, Rixdorf had become largely defined by its multifaceted industries and artisanry. (Note: Hugh Chisholm (ed.), The Encyclopædia Britannica, ed. 11, vol. 23, Cambridge 1911, p. 388, col. 1, s.v. "Rixdorf": "[Rixdorf] is almost entirely occupied by a large industrial and artisan population, engaged in the manufacture of linoleum, furniture, cloth, pianos, beer, soap, [etc.].")

=== Early neighborhood formation ===
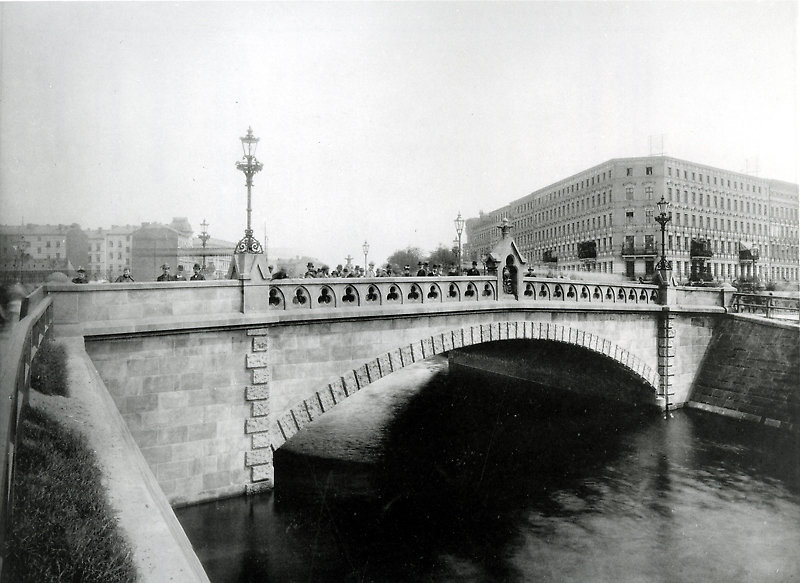
Kottbusser Brücke with Maybachufer (right background), Reuterkiez, 1894

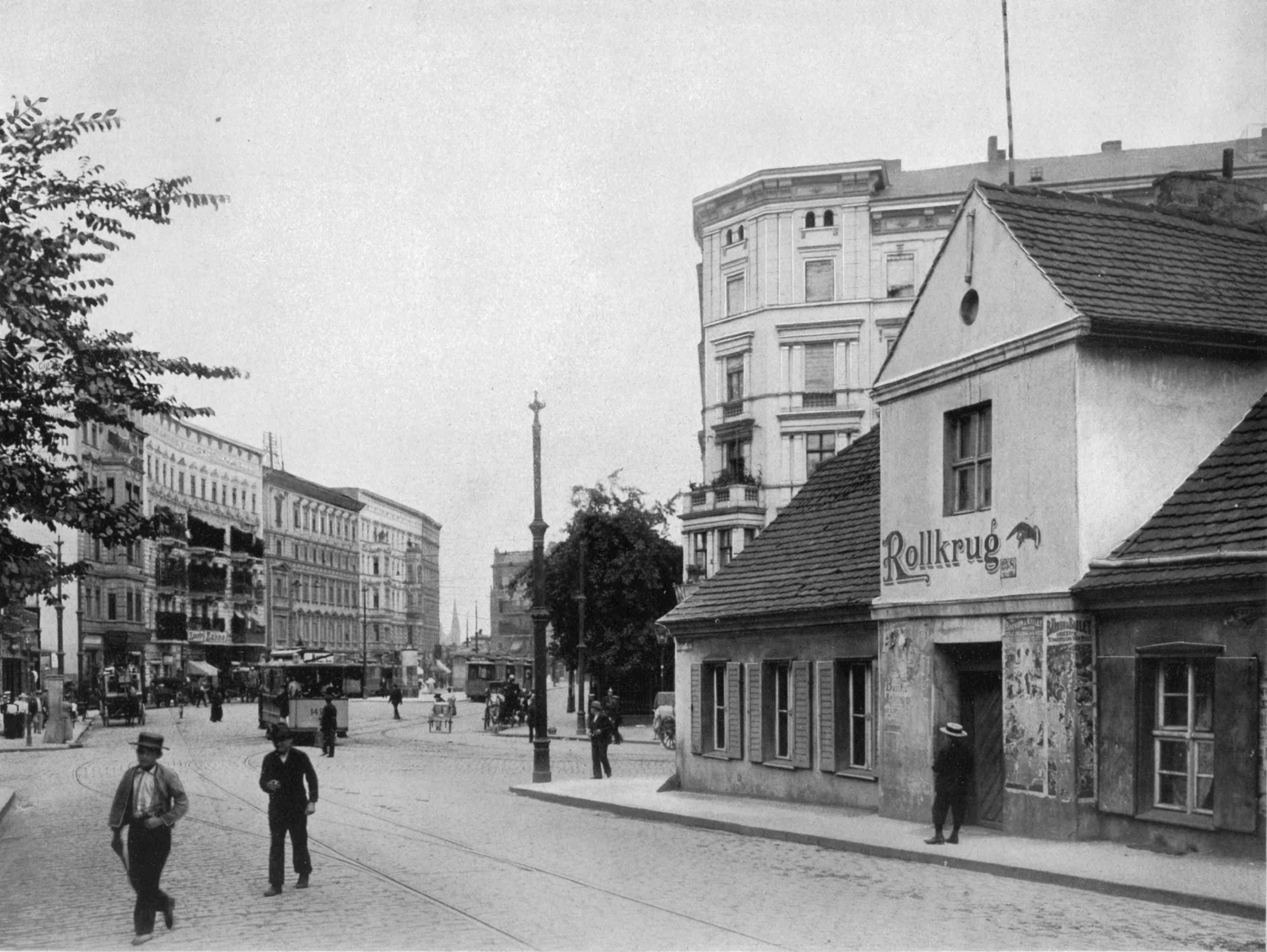
Hermannstraße with Rollkrug, Flughafenkiez, 1900

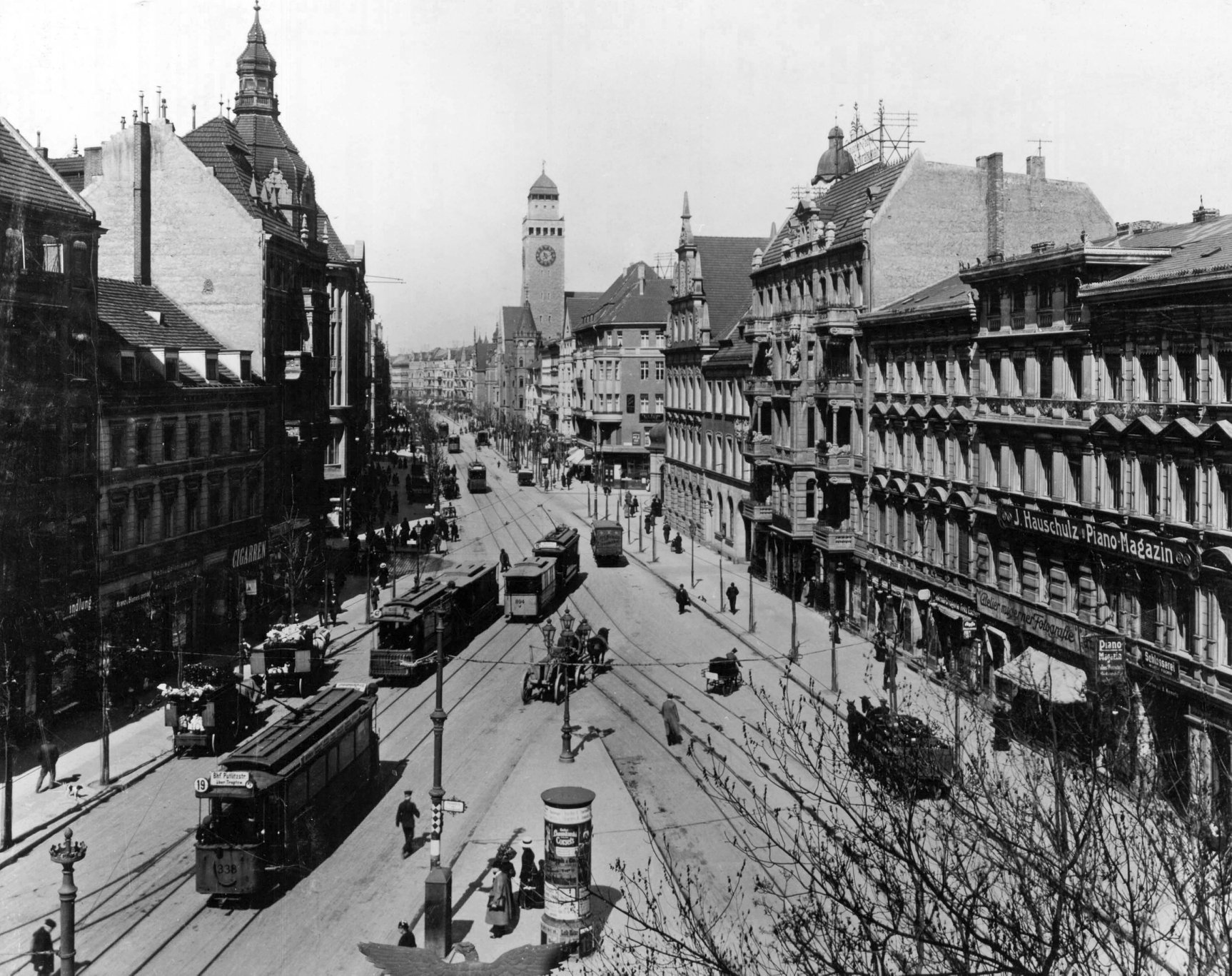
Berliner Straße with City Hall (background), Rixdorf, ca. 1910

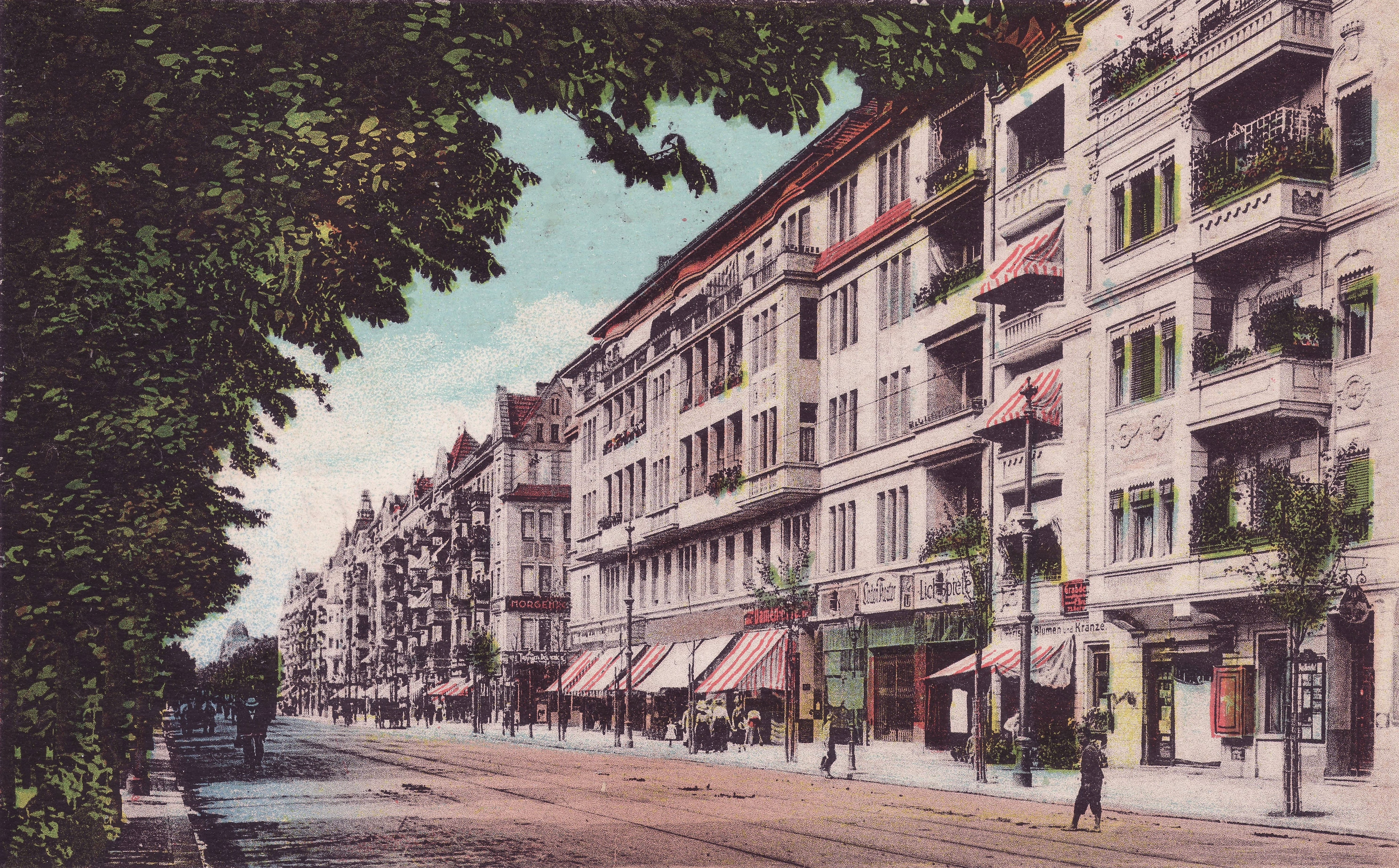
Hermannstraße near Schierker Straße, Körnerpark, ca. 1914

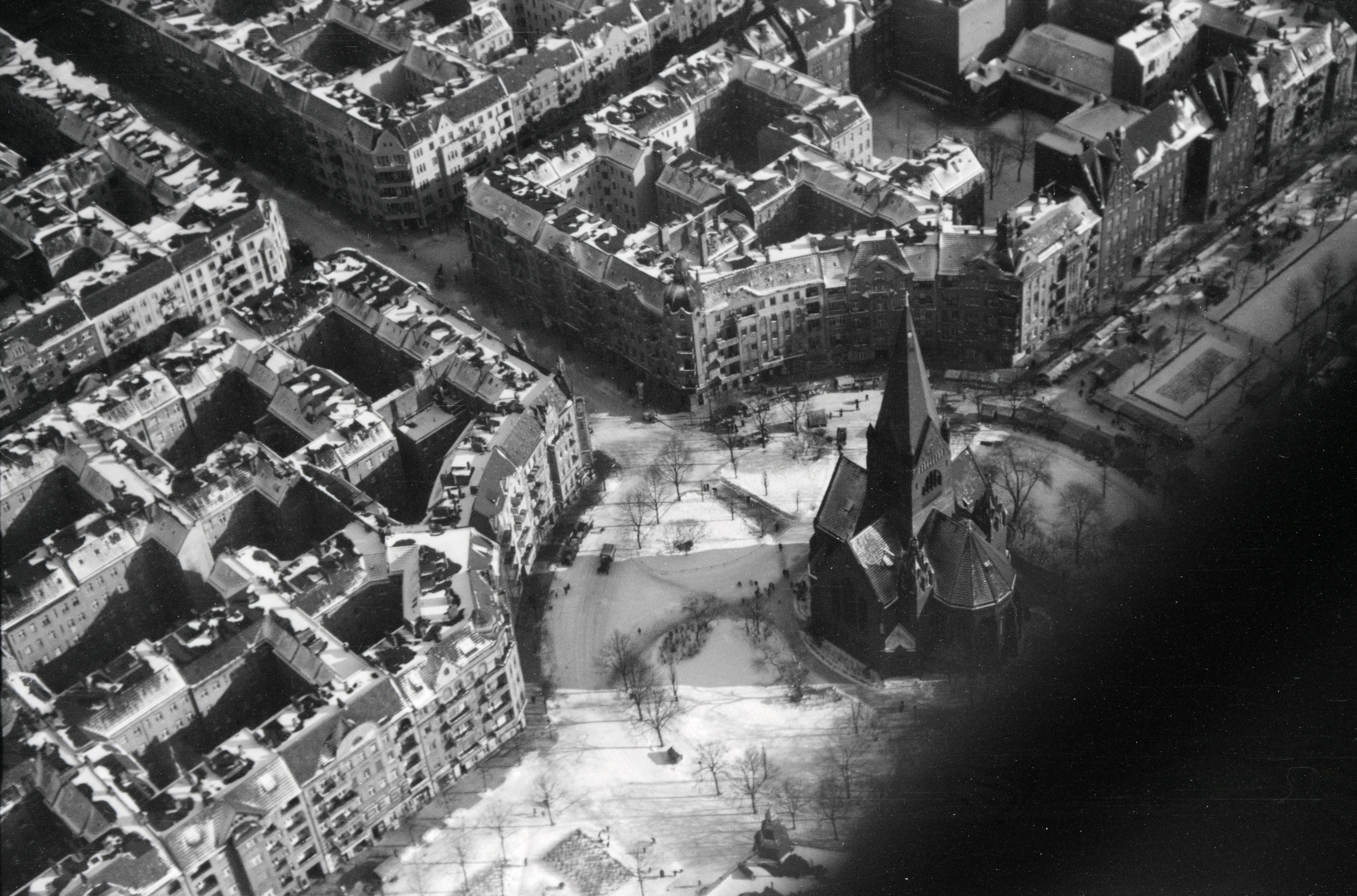
Schillerpromenade with Herrfurthplatz and Genezareth Church, Schillerkiez, 1933

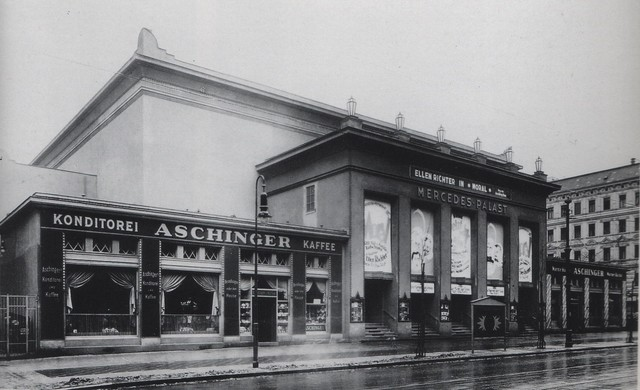
Mercedes-Palast movie theater, Rollberg, 1936

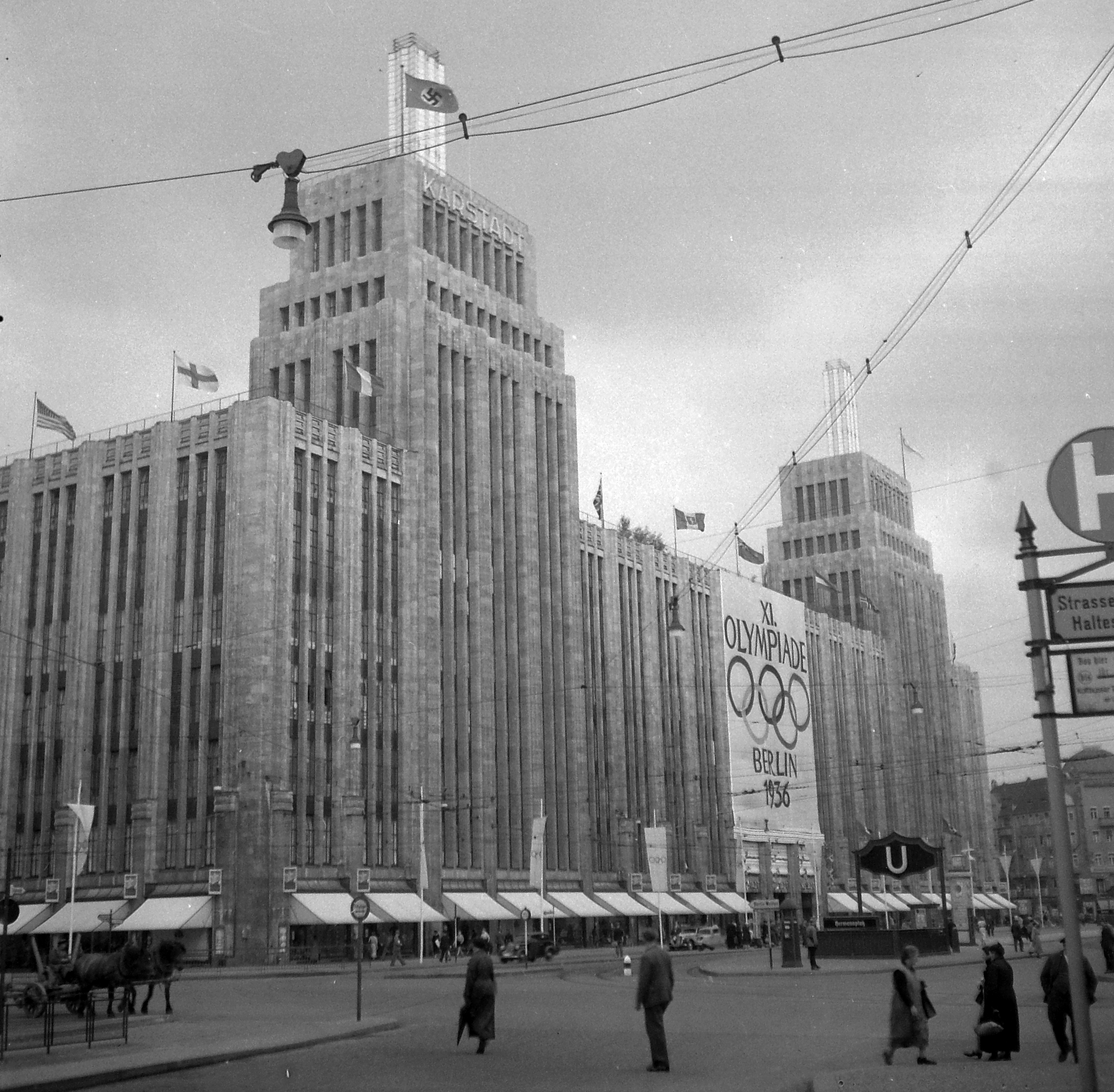
Hermannplatz with Karstadt department store, Donaukiez, 1936

It was during the 1850s when construction of the first residential areas, the Neucöllner Siedlungen (Neukölln Estates), began north and northwest of the old Rixdorf, first along the road to modern-day Hermannplatz. Today, the area is known as the Donaukiez. Development east of the Cottbuserdamm (Kottbusser Damm) (Note: Named after the city of Cottbus; it was built sometime between 1850 (terminus post quem) and 1874 (terminus ante quem) as a replacement for the old elevated road through the Cöllnische Wiesen into Cölln and Alt-Berlin via present-day Kottbusser Tor, originally called Ricksdorfscher Damm and Ricksdorfsche Straße, which had existed there since the 16th century. It was part of the old road from Cölln via present-day Hermannplatz and through Rixdorf along present-day Karl-Marx-Straße to Mittenwalde (Brandenburg), later extended to Cottbus; in 1712, a second southern extension of the Ricksdorfscher Damm to Dresden along present-day Hermannstraße had been built as a postal, trade and military road, the Dresdener Heerstraße, which was often used as a pars pro toto name for the Ricksdorfscher Damm before its renaming in the 19th century.) in the Berlinische Wiesen, modern-day Reuterkiez, followed soon after. After the completion of the Landwehr Canal in 1850 near the location of the older Müllen-Graben (Mühlengraben, Mill Trench), (Note: Before the first windmills were constructed, it was known as Schafgraben (Sheep's Trench) at least since the early 15th century, later also as Floßgraben (Timber Raft Trench) and Landwehr-Graben (Land defense Trench); the new Landwehr Canal roughly also followed the western stretch of Rixdorf's old Wiesengraben (Meadow Trench), formerly known as Schlangengraben (Snake Trench), before turning north toward the river Spree.) industry and workshops began to settle along its shores in the marshes and meadows south of the Berlin Customs Wall, (Note: On some historical maps, this part of the Berlinische Wiesen, originally called Cöllnische Wiesen, is named Niederländer Wiesen (lowland meadows).) on and near today's Maybachufer. The Cottbuser Damm and several parallel streets like the Friedelstraße, (Note: Named after Ernst Friedel (1837–1918), a Berlin politician, jurist and historian. It was originally a forest and meadow trail, next to a small creek later redeveloped as a drainage channel, that had existed since at least the mid-17th century and connected the Rollkrug tavern and southern Ricksdorfscher Damm with a bathing place on the canal and a windmill nearby. Before its development, the Friedelstraße was designated Straße 12 c ("12th Street c"), based on the original Hobrecht-Plan; parts of the southern section were named Friedelstraße already in 1895, while the northern section was originally called Wiebestraße before 1900, named after Hermann Wiebe, engineer, millwright and president of the Berlin Bauakademie (building academy).) an important street in Berlin's first communal electric tram network, (Note: See Tramway of the city of Berlin (Straßenbahnen der Stadt Berlin, SSB); until then, Rixdorf's own tram lines had been horse-drawn (Pferde-Eisenbahn), and the electric tram network development had been managed by the Südliche Berliner Vorortbahn (SBV).) were built shortly afterwards. (Note: Today, the Friedelkiez, the area around the Friedelstraße, which is mainly part of the LORs Maybachufer and Reuterplatz, is of central significance with regard to gentrification in the north of Neukölln's Reuterquartier, and forms an urban cultural hub between the Weserkiez and Kreuzberg's SO 36 neighborhood, which is accessible via the Hobrechtbrücke across the Landwehr Canal.) Between 1871 and 1905, the population increased, as several Gründerzeit apartment blocks were erected, often with industrial backyards that are still typical of Berlin today. Construction was temporarily set back due to a devastating fire in 1886 that destroyed nearly all of the city block between Kottbusser Damm, Maybachufer and Schinkestraße. Different from other neighborhoods of northern Rixdorf, most residential development in the Reuterkiez had from the beginning always been aimed at more affluent residents and a higher quality of living, but except for the Reuterplatz forgone any development of green urban plazas. Due to the marshy substrate, the new neighborhood was at first only developed between Kottbusser Damm and Weichselstraße, and was instead extended southward beyond the old Donaukiez and into the modern-day neighborhood of Flughafenstraße. In the decades that followed, Rixdorf and the early residential areas were expanded west- and southward respectively, forming Neukölln's younger neighborhoods of Schillerpromenade, Körnerpark and the historical Rollberg.

Starting in 1875 after the approval of a new development plan, construction also began in the areas immediately west of Rixdorf as an extension of the original Neucöllner Siedlungen. Present-day Rollberg and the remainder of Flughafenstraße, were developed first, with Rollberg mainly as working-class outskirts with backyard manufacturing and larger industries, (Note: Due to Berlin's unusually high ground water level, much of the older industry had to settle to the north and south of the glacial valley on the Barnim and Teltow plateaus to be able to construct deep basements for manufacturing and storage, especially attracting breweries like Rixdorf's Vereinsbrauerei (association brewery) of the Berliner Gastwirte Aktiengesellschaft (Berlin Innkeepers joint-stock company), the predecessor of the Kindl-Brauerei, which needed large underground fermentation vaults.) tightly packed tenements, small apartments and tiny residential backyards. (Note: Due to redevelopment in the late 20th century, most of these early structures were eventually torn down (see below).) To this end, and to also furnish raw material for construction in the rest of Berlin, most of the rolling agricultural hills of the Rollberge range were excavated and leveled, and Rixdorf's sixteen windmills torn down, (Note: Rixdorf's first windmill from 1650 had already been torn down on 12 April 1848, while the Bohemian windmill was dismantled in 1886 and reconstructed in Jüterbog.) with the last windmill dismantled in 1899. In the first wave, four new parallel streets as well as the Kopfstraße between Bergstraße, present-day Karl-Marx-Straße, and Hermannstraße were constructed together with the crossways Falk- and Morusstraße on the flattened Rollberge slopes. The working-class tenements, even in the front buildings, were small and overcrowded, (Note: The rents were comparatively high, so most of the regular tenants had to sublet to additional Schlafgänger (part-time lodgers).) sunless and unaerated, and unsanitary without personal water closets or rooms for hygiene, which promoted diseases and epidemics, infant and child mortality, violence and crime, but also ignited the spark that changed Rixdorf and Neukölln into a Socialist heartland, fueling the city's widespread support for the November Revolution, the class struggles of the 1920s and '30s, and later also the quarter's potent resistance movement against the Nazis (1933–45). However, the financial crises and wars in early 20th century Germany prevented any contemporary redevelopment in Rollberg until the 1960s and '70s.

Schillerpromenade and parts of Körnerpark, on the other hand, followed the Reuterkiez model with apartment buildings for wealthier residents, and the two neighborhoods still have a large Gründerzeit architectural foundation with broad streets and sidewalks, and Berlin's usual grid plan street layout that originated mostly in this era. (Note: Cf. Mark Twain, "The Chicago of Europe", Chicago Daily Tribune, 3 April 1892, with relevant parts emphasized: "Berlin […] is newer to the eye than is any other city, and also blonder of complexion and tidier; no other city has such an air of roominess, freedom from crowding; no other city has so many straight streets; and with Chicago it contests the chromo for flatness of surface and for phenomenal swiftness of growth. Berlin is the European Chicago. The two cities have about the same population—say a million and a half. […] But now the parallels fail. Only parts of Chicago are stately and beautiful, whereas all of Berlin is stately and substantial, and it is not merely in parts but uniformly beautiful.") For the Körnerpark neighborhood, this development was a natural evolution due to its proximity to Alt-Rixdorf, though the street blocks further south were for the most part developed in the 1920s and '30s, so the area has not evolved as uniformly. Schillerpromenade benefited from its location on even farmland adjacent to the Tempelhofer Feld, which was better suited than the area on the Rollberge slopes. Construction of the new residential park in present-day Schillerkiez began with Rixdorf's 1901 development plan. The ambitious Gründerzeit estates, the broad promenade parallel to Hermannstraße and the circular central plaza (Herrfurthplatz) with the Genezareth Church were markedly aimed at wealthier settlers, as a counterpoint to the older Rollberg neighborhood of ill repute. In 1905, residential construction was in full swing, schools and an academy were built, and main development ended around 1914 except for the westernmost city blocks at Oderstraße, which were developed only in 1927 by Bruno Taut according to modern reformist ideals. The large sports grounds in the neighborhood's south-western corner (Sportpark Tempelhofer Feld), today the Werner-Seelenbinder-Sportpark, opened in 1928.

== Neukölln ==
Rixdorf had become notorious across Germany for its taverns, amusement sites and red-light districts, which dampened investments, economic development and the immigration of wealthier citizens, exacerbated by the enduring popularity of the 1889 proletarian song Der Rixdorfer. So in 1912 the local authorities took up former mayor Boddin's earlier plan, which until then had been consistently rejected, to get rid of this reputation by assuming a new name. Voting against Boddin's original proposal, the city officials chose Neukölln, (Note: Apart from the infamy and economic disadvantages, some representatives had different and more ordinary reservations regarding the city's name, arguing that the last syllable -dorf ("village") had become unbefitting of Prussia's largest town, while some had even taken offense at the unaesthetic sound of the first syllable Rix-. The alternative name, originally proposed by first mayor Boddin in an act of self-approval, had been Hermannstadt (Herbert Schwenk, "Alle ding… vorgan mit der tydt – Die Verwandlungen von Rixdorf und Neukölln", Berlinische Monatsschrift 8, p. 43, Berlin 2001; Fabian Friedmann, "Der Patriarch", Neukoellner, 19 September 2012).) which referenced both Rixdorf's historical parent city Cölln and the Cöllnische Heide (Cölln Heath) to the east, but was mainly derived from the Neucöllner Siedlungen ("Neucölln Estates") just north of Rixdorf, (Note: "Böhmisches Dorf", Bezirksamt Neukölln, Berlin 2015 (2023). Construction of these estates had begun in 1875 in the Berlinische Wiesen (Berlin Meadows), formerly known as Cöllnische Wiesen (Cölln Meadows), after Hermann Boddin's 1874 ordinance to revoke the herding warrant (see above).) whose name, whether intentionally or not, imitated Neu-Cölln, a historical district south of the medieval part of Berlin and Cölln proper. The renaming was primarily lobbied for by real estate speculators, local industrialists in fear of market losses, and the Crown, represented by a group of imperial supporters, and was swiftly adopted by the conservative council majority against the dissenting populace and social democrats, who, much to the dismay of the conservatives, had gained a lot of political traction in the years before. (Note: Across Germany, the renaming scheme was mostly viewed as a farce, and the ensuing satirical ridicule spread as far as the United Kingdom; Gunda Bartels, "Wie aus Rixdorf Neukölln wurde: Der Ruf war ruiniert", Tagesspiegel, 26 January 2012.) The renaming was then petitioned pro forma by mayor Curt Kaiser and eventually granted by Emperor William I on 27 January 1912. At the time, Neukölln's population stood at 253,000.

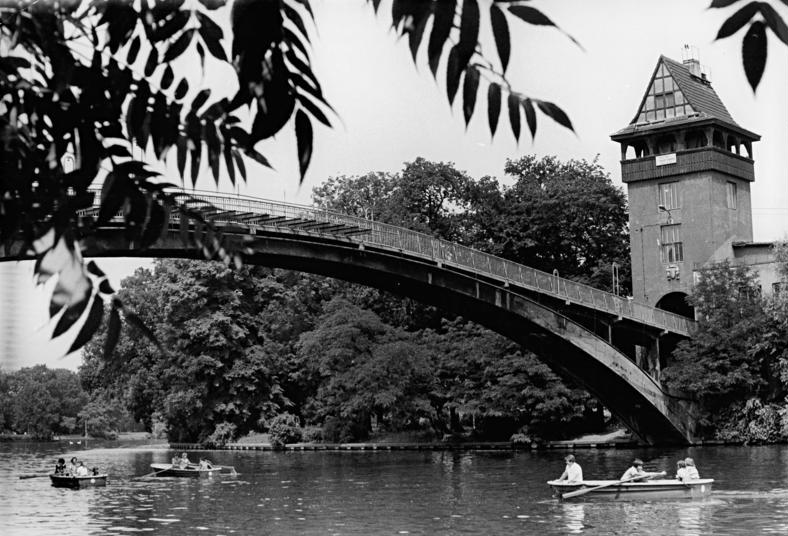
Abteibrücke at the Insel der Jugend

In 1913, the city of Neukölln bought the Spree island Abteiinsel, today's Insel der Jugend (Youth Island), which had originally been owned by one of Rixdorf's citizens, (Note: Emil Heinicke had bought the unappropriated island, then called Rohr-Insel ("Canebrake Island"), Treppbruch and Treptower Bruch ("Treptow Swamp"), from the town of Deutsch-Rixdorf in 1860; the Treptow mainland (including the Rohr-Insel) had historically been part of the Richardsdorf lot within the Tempelhof dominion, and also the location of the Burgwall, a former Templar folwark (see above); ownership of the island, which was later also known as Neu-Spreeland ("New Spreeland"), changed hands many times until Neukölln's purchase in 1913.) and constructed the Abteibrücke between the exclave and the mainland of Alt-Treptow, one of Germany's first reinforced concrete bridges. (Note: The price for Neukölln's new island was 500,000 mark, approximately $2.5 million (2024); after the formation of Greater Berlin in 1920, the island became part of Alt-Treptow.) Neukölln's bath house opened to the public on 10 May 1914. From 1912 to 1913, the Rixdorf Branch Canal became the Neukölln Ship Canal, further extended southward to the Neukölln Harbor and the Teltow Canal. Construction of the second stage at the Neukölln Watergate concluded in 1914, and the canal officially opened on 1 April of the same year. 6,600 of Neukölln's residents fell serving at the frontlines in World War I (1914–18). Despite the war years, urban development had continued unabated at first, and Rixdorf had become one of the most important suburban cities outside of Berlin. From 1 October 1917, waste management services were provided directly by the city.

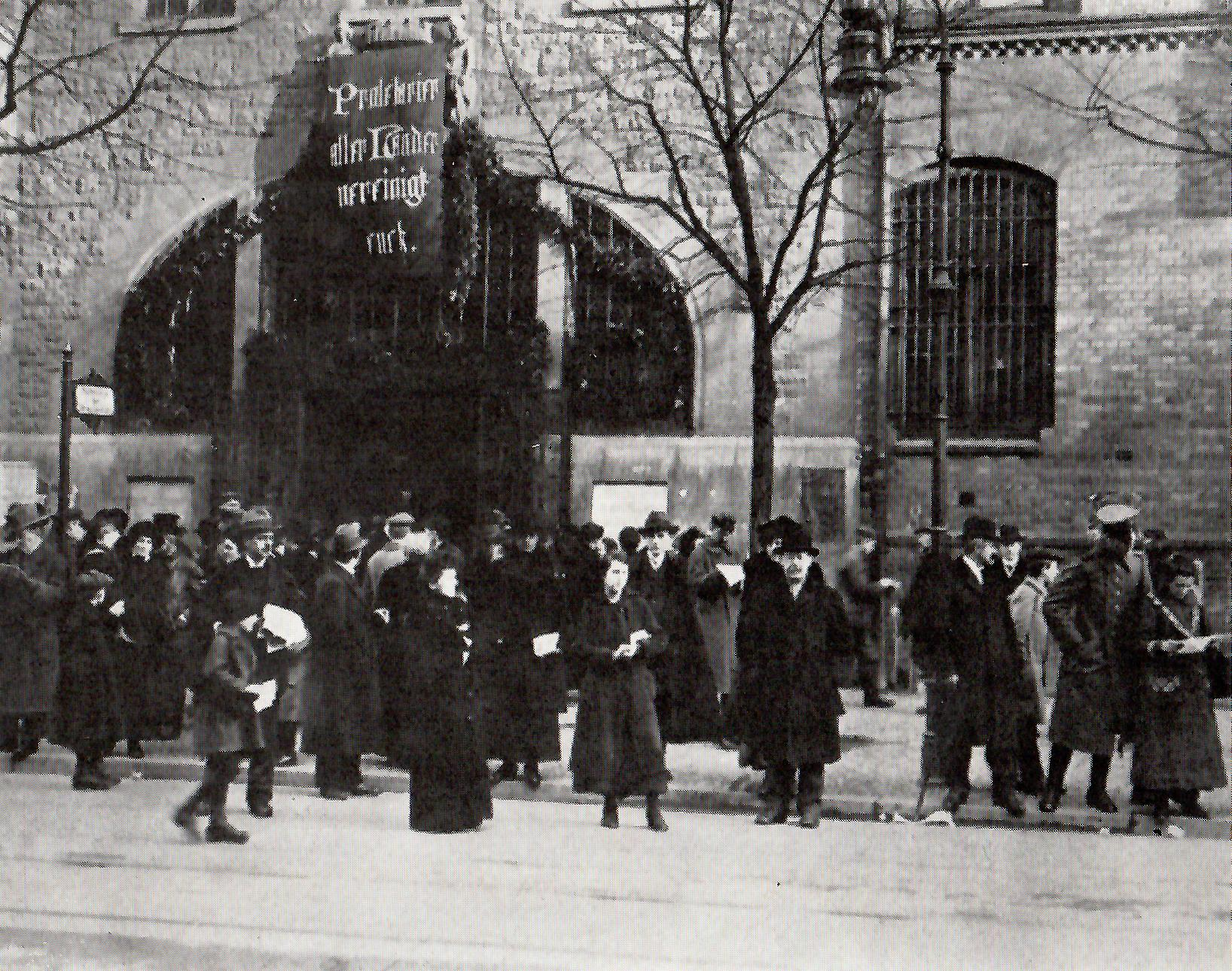
November Revolution, Neukölln City Hall, Rixdorf, 9 November 1918 (Note: The banner reads Proletarier aller Länder vereinigt euch ("Proletarians of all countries unite"), quoting one of the famous rallying cries from the Communist Manifesto; the street at Neukölln's City Hall was eventually renamed to Karl-Marx-Straße.)

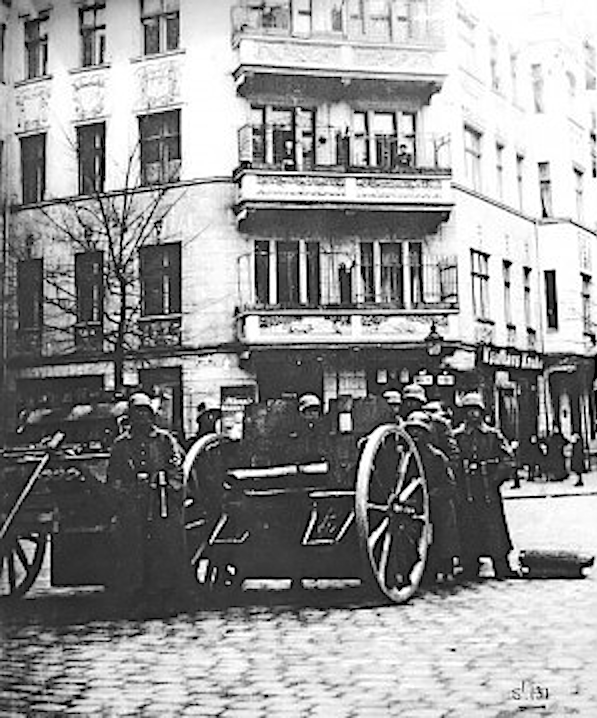
Kapp Putsch: Reichswehr on the Weisestraße, Schillerkiez, March 1920

At the end of the war, the November Revolution led to the formation of the city's Workers' and Soldiers' Council. On 8 November 1918, the first soldiers who were stationed at Mahlower Straße in the Schillerkiez, joined the new revolutionary movement. One day later, the council seized power in Neukölln, dissolved the city's assembly, and disempowered Lord Mayor Curt Kaiser. The ruling council, consisting of 24 SPD members, 24 independents, who were mostly Spartacists, and 24 soldiers, now decided on all political issues from executive orders to decrees on food rationing. On 25 November, an interregional convention of revolutionary councils passed a comprehensive socialist action plan. It meant that Neukölln's council would abolish all municipal authorities, take over the city's banks, and declare all private real estate as communal property, while threatening to expropriate uncooperative local industrialists without indemnity. However, a faction of the Prussian Army's 17th infantry division, presumably ordered by the provisional government and Gustav Noske, deployed in January 1919 and laid siege to Neukölln, eventually occupying and dissolving the Workers' and Soldiers' Council. The counter-putsch angered the populace, and many of Neukölln's workers, employees and officers threatened a general strike, forcing the troops to reinstate the council and retreat. The SPD, however, was barred from the reformed council, as the party was blamed for the short-lived counter-putsch.

Shortly before their executions at the hand of the Freikorps, revolutionaries Rosa Luxemburg and Karl Liebknecht found refuge in Neukölln, probably in the Weisestraße (Schillerkiez), before relocating to Wilmersdorf, where they were captured by the local militia (Bürgerwehr). Alfred Scholz (SPD), whose wife Gertrud had been the only female member of Neukölln's Workers' and Soldiers' Council, was elected mayor in April 1919, while Neukölln's Lord Mayor Curt Kaiser stayed in office until the end of his term on 1 November 1919. The revolutionary councils eventually disbanded after the inauguration of the Weimar National Assembly in 1919, and Neukölln's council was dissolved on 7 November 1919, which resulted in riots at City Hall. Even though the councils were short-lived, Neukölln's prominent and early role in the November Revolution sustainably mainstreamed socialist ideals in local politics.

During the Kapp Putsch (13–17 March 1920), which aimed to undo the German Revolution and overthrow the new Weimar Republic, parts of Neukölln were temporarily occupied by the Reichswehr, until the coup d'état was aborted after 100 hours.

== Berlin-Neukölln ==
The newly forming societies and infrastructures of Berlin and its periphery created problems and threatened to thwart further development, because the disparity between the different communities, which naturally aimed to expand beyond the old municipal boundaries, now created cross-border administrative conflicts and gridlock. Therefore, the Greater Berlin Act was passed by the Prussian parliament in the spring of 1920, and the city of Neukölln ceased to exist on 1 October 1920 after only two decades of independence, when it was incorporated as a part of Greater Berlin together with a large number of other suburban communes and cities. Together with the quarters Britz, Rudow and Buckow, Neukölln now formed the new homonymous borough of Neukölln, Berlin's 14th (and since the 2001 reform 8th) administrative district, which eventually added the newly established quarter of Gropiusstadt in 2002. At the time of the merger, the city of Neukölln had a population of 262,128. (Note: Census of 8 October 1919.) The old Rixdorf continued to exist, and is today represented by two neighborhoods in the center of Neukölln, Böhmisch-Rixdorf and Richardplatz-Süd. In preparation for Neukölln's incorporation, the first election of the new assembly of borough representatives (Bezirksverordnetenversammlung, BVV) was held on 20 June 1920, but had to be repeated on 16 October 1921. (Note: The 1920 local election followed the 6 June 1920 German federal election; in Berlin it was a dual election, both in the Greater Berlin boroughs and of the state deputies who would serve in the Berlin Abgeordnetenhaus (State House of Representatives). However, the constituents of the new boroughs were not yet allowed to vote in the Berlin state election, but that election was eventually declared void due to partial electoral fraud and repeated on 16 October 1921. Neukölln's BVV election was also repeated, and the SPD (27.9%) became the winner before the socialist USPD (23.8%) and the communist KPD (13.8%); "Wahlen zu den Bezirksverordnetenversammlungen in Berlin am 16. Oktober 1921 nach Bezirken und Parteien – Stimmen in Prozent", Der Landeswahlleiter für Berlin, Amt für Statistik Berlin-Brandenburg. The first Berlin state election, in which Neukölln's constituents were finally allowed to vote, was held on 25 October 1925.)

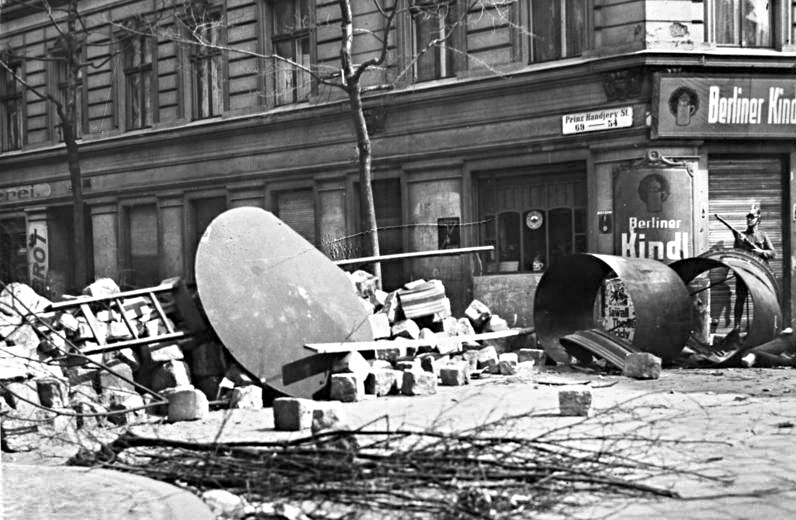
Bloody May barricades at the Briesestraße, Rollberg, 1929

In the Weimar Republic, Neukölln's population eventually grew to 278,208 in 1930. (Note: Friedrich Leyden, Gross-Berlin. Geographie der Weltstadt, Breslau 1933; the largest pre-war population in the borough of Neukölln was 313,790 in 1932.) On 22 October 1921, a patronage society for Neukölln's museum was founded, which led to a large expansion of the museum's exhibits in 1922. Berlin Tempelhof Airport, whose airfield was part of Neukölln and Tempelhof, opened on 8 October 1923 and was expanded in several phases until 1941. To relieve the older tram networks, the Berlin S-Bahn was electrified starting in 1926, while Neukölln's Südring (south ring) lines were modernized in 1928. Additionally, two lines of the Berlin U-Bahn, the Nord-Süd-Bahn and the GN-Bahn, were extended through Neukölln between 1926 and 1930. (Note: Alternate proposals from the 1900s and 1910s for connecting Rixdorf and Berlin were a north-to-south suspension railway line from Gesundbrunnen station through the inner city, or a subway line by AEG from southern Reinickendorf and following a similar route, or the diagonal northwest-to-southeast Moabit–Rixdorf line from Huttenstraße at the western end of Turmstraße, all of them eventually via Kottbusser Damm, Hermannplatz and Karl-Marx-Straße to Rixdorf Station at the Ringbahn or to Grenzallee; cf. e.g. Max Rudeloff (ed.), "Entwurf einer Schwebebahn für Berlin", Dinglers Polytechnisches Journal 86, no. 320, issue 45, 11 November 1905, p. 705 sqq.; these plans were scrapped in favor of the GN-Bahn and an eastern branch for the Nord-Süd-Bahn. The first line opened to the public on 11 April 1926; the Nord-Süd-Bahn, since 1928 Line C, today the U6, originally had a junction to a secondary eastbound branch into Neukölln at the historical Belle-Alliance-Straße station, and this Neukölln branch later became part of today's U7; in the second stage, the Neukölln branch, since 1928 called Line C^{I}, was extended from the old terminus Bergstraße to Grenzallee, and after its opening on 21 December 1930 it remained the terminus until the third stage opened in 1963 with an extension into the rest of the Neukölln borough. The GN-Bahn (Gesundbrunnen–Neukölln line), since 1928 Line D, which eventually became the U8, opened on 17 July 1927, in Neukölln at first as a stump line between Boddinstraße and Schönleinstraße via Hermannplatz, before being joined with the northern stump in two stages (12 February and 6 April 1928); a southern extension to Leinestraße opened in August 1929; the final extension to the S-Bahn interchange Hermanstraße had already been planned in 1910, but wasn't implemented until the year 1996.)

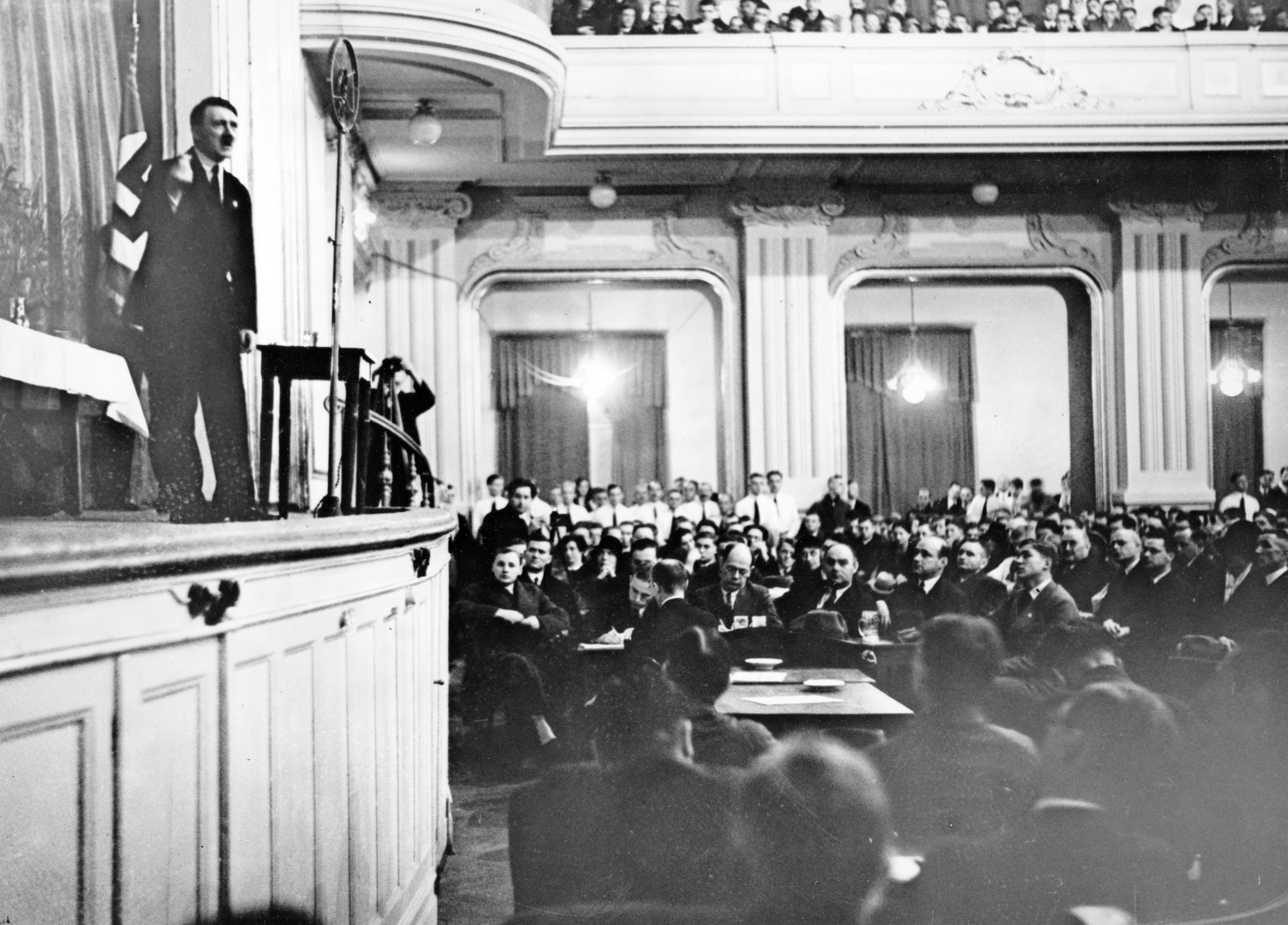
Hitler at the Neue Welt, 1930

Neukölln remained a working-class quarter and communist stronghold, especially in the Rollberg neighborhood. This led to increasing tensions between left-wing radicals like the KPD and the Berlin police, culminating in the Bloody May riots of 1929 (Blutmai) with 14 fatalities and 17 injured. The Nazis viewed the quarter as "Red Neukölln", and tensions with the rivaling socialist and communist groups ensued as early as November 1926, when Joseph Goebbels sent over 300 men of the Sturmabteilung (SA) on a propaganda march through Neukölln, ending in clashes on the Hermannplatz. The emerging resistance against National Socialism also spilled over into regional church politics as the 1929 Neuköllner Kirchenstreit (Neukölln church conflict), when Protestant priest Arthur Rackwitz was only granted his inauguration at Neukölln's Philipp Melanchthon Church after an intervention by cultural minister Adolf Grimme, which had previously been denied due to his religious-socialist and anti-fascist positions, as well as his open criticism of the Protestant authorities' support for the Nazis. The beer hall Neue Welt on Hasenheide near Hermannplatz was the 1930 location of one of Adolf Hitler's early speeches in Berlin. (Note: 4 December 1930; in his speech to mainly students, Hitler also touched on his aesthetic visions for the future, and further persuaded the assistant professor Albert Speer, who was also in attendance, on his national socialist path; Albert Speer, Erinnerungen, Frankfurt am Main 1969, 32 sq.; cf. also Constantin Goschler (ed.), Hitler: Reden, Schriften, Anordnungen 4 (1), Munich 1994, s.v. "Dok. 37", p. 145 with n. 2. One other speech by Hitler from the Nazis' so-called Berliner Kampfzeit ("Berlin time of struggle") was allegedly given in 1931 across the street on the Kreuzberg side of Hasenheide in Kliems Festsäle, but no sources exist; his speech on 10 September 1930 in the Orpheum, also on Hasenheide, was canceled at the last minute; cf. id. 3 (3), s.v. "Dok. 110", p. 408, n. 2.) The conflicts eventually intensified until the end of the republic, leading to occasional armed engagements like the Rixdorf shootout of October 1931, when communists attacked the Richardsburg, a Sturmlokal of the SA.

After Hitler's Machtübernahme in 1933, the SA extended their campaigns and also targeted rallies and events by moderate parties like the SPD. Neukölln's borough mayor Alfred Scholz (SPD) and all politically undesirable officials of Neukölln's district office had to resign under pressure from the new ruling Nazi Party and the enactment of the Law for the Restoration of the Professional Civil Service, which was enforced by the SA, whose riot squads occupied the district office on 15 and 16 March 1933, headed by Nazi politicians like local NSDAP representative and district chairman (Kreisleiter) Hans Fink and Kurt Samson, who was unlawfully appointed borough mayor. Many of Germany's resistance fighters and activists against Nazi rule operated from "red Neukölln", for example Heinz Kapelle and Ursula Goetze, who coordinated with the Red Orchestra in the quarter. (Note: See also Die Innere Front; some activists also moved to socialist East Germany after the war and became prominent state officials and politicians, for example Klaus Gysi and Friedel Hoffmann.) Neukölln's museum was reenvisioned as a museum for education and local history in 1934 under its director Felix Woldt. In time for the 1936 Summer Olympics in Berlin, the 1872 Jahndenkmal memorial for Turnvater Jahn in the park Hasenheide was relocated, slightly redesigned and expanded with a commemorative grove, which exists to this day.

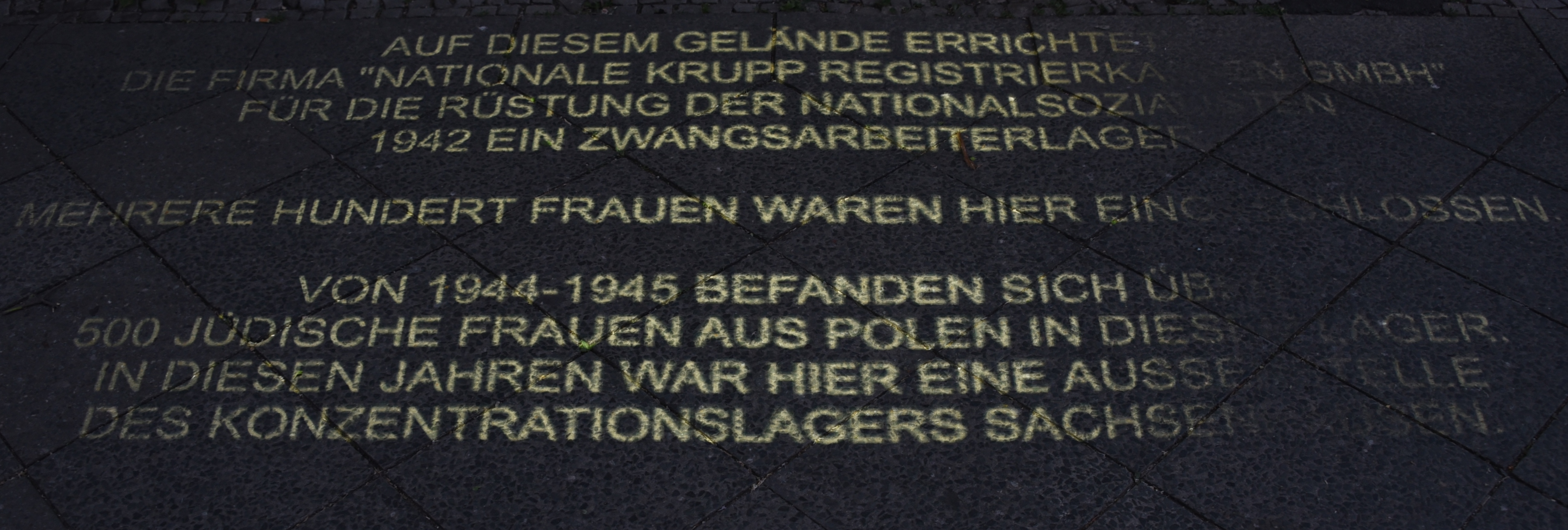
Commemorative light installation at the location of the Rixdorf concentration camp, Sonnenallee

As a prelude to the Shoah, Neukölln's only synagogue on Isarstraße (Flughafenkiez) as well as numerous Jewish businesses and property were attacked and demolished during the Kristallnacht of 1938. Today, only a commemorative plaque remains of the synagogue. (Note: In addition, the first stolperstein in Neukölln to honor the victims of Nazism was laid in 2006 in front of Hermannstraße 46; as of 2024, Neukölln has 242 of these commemorative pavement stones.) At the same time, Neukölln's remaining Jewish politicians and officers were forced to resign from their posts at the district office. After the onset of World War II in 1939, the Rixdorf factories of the Krupp-Registrierkassen-Gesellschaft and American company National Cash Register, which had merged as the National Krupp Registrierkassen GmbH during the Weimar Republic, were transformed into military production facilities. (Note: Between Weigandufer 39–45 at the Neukölln Ship Canal and Sonnenallee 181–89, at the time renamed to Braunauer Straße.) In 1941, the Friedhof Lilienthalstraße in Hasenheide, which had been built by Wilhelm Büning, opened as a cemetery for the fallen soldiers of the Wehrmacht. Today, it is a general cemetery for the victims of World War II. In 1942 a forced labor camp for up to 865 mainly Jewish and Romani women from the conquered Eastern territories and Axis states, especially Hungary, was established on the National Krupp factory grounds. In 1944 it was absorbed as one of several Berlin outposts (Außenlager) of the Sachsenhausen concentration camp, primarily for female Jewish-Polish forced laborers, who had been transferred from the Łódź Ghetto and Auschwitz respectively. The camp's last remaining barracks stood until the year 1957, long after the Jewish survivors had emigrated. (Note: Neukölln's and Berlin's Jewish survivors at first sheltered i.a. in Berlin's UNRRA camps for Jewish displaced persons, e.g. in nearby Mariendorf, before emigrating to Israel or the United States; these camps were mainly constructed between 1945 and 1946 for Jewish refugees from Poland, who were fleeing post-war anti-semitic pogroms; cf. Sigrid Kneist, "Eine eigene Stadt mitten in Berlin", Tagesspiegel, 25 July 2021 (archived).)

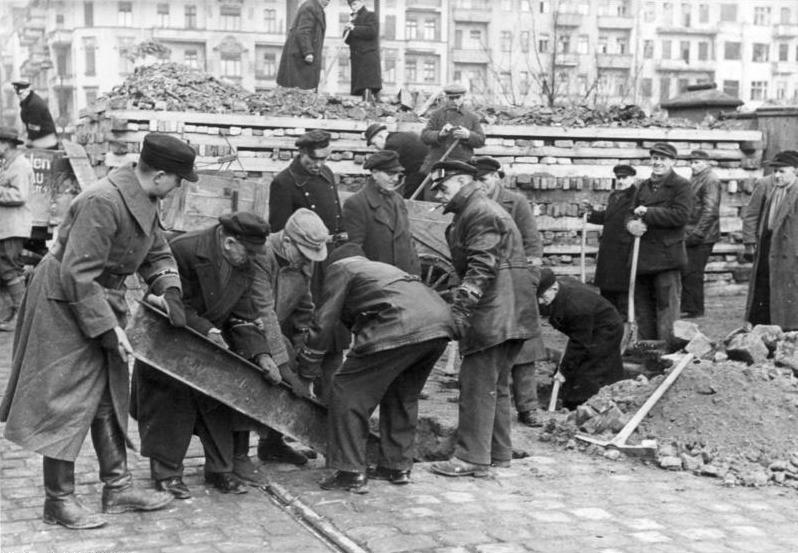
Volkssturm fortifying antitank barriers at Hermannstraße Station, 10 March 1945

On 15 March 1945, Neukölln City Hall was damaged by an allied bomb, which forced borough mayor Kurt Samson and his district officers to relocate to a nearby school building, today's Albert-Schweitzer-Gymnasium. Against Samson's will, district chairman Karl Wollenberg then ordered a unit of the Waffen-SS with support from the local Hitler Youth to fortify the abandoned building as part of the Volkssturm's last line of defense against the approaching Soviet Army. In Neukölln, the Battle of Berlin commenced on 26 April 1945, after the enemy's forces had broken through Neukölln's two main points of defense, from the north through antitank barriers on the Treptower Bridge via the Neukölln Ship Canal, and from the south via a temporary bridge across the Teltow Canal. Eventually, the Volkssturm disbanded, and most of the Waffen-SS retreated to defend Berlin's innermost city, leaving primarily the Hitler Youth to defend the quarter's bridges. Neukölln's last stand at the remaining Waffen-SS holdout was around City Hall, which eventually caught fire. The Soviets took Neukölln on 28 April, but not before the Waffen-SS could demolish Europe's largest department store, the Karstadt on Hermannplatz, which cost the lives of many unsuspecting civilians. At the end of the war, Neukölln's population had decreased by roughly 30,000, and 9% of the quarter's buildings had been destroyed, with 12% severely damaged by allied bombing raids, including the Mercedes-Palast in the Rollberg neighborhood, which since 1927 had housed Europe's largest movie theater. (Note: Parts of the building were saved and used as a theater, a smaller movie theater and a music venue until the 1960s.)

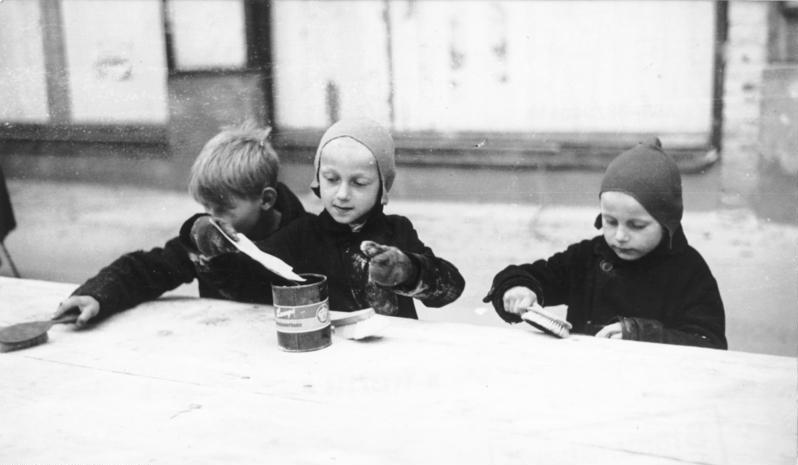
Notzeit in Neukölln, 1945 (Note: Children in Neukölln sweeping up flour leftovers from the bed of a transport truck for cooking gruel.)

After the fall of the Nazi regime, borough mayor Kurt Samson was arrested and incarcerated as a Soviet prisoner of war at the NKVD special camp 2, the former Buchenwald concentration camp, where he eventually died in early spring of 1947. During Germany's Notzeit ("time of need") after the war, Neukölln was leading Berlin's boroughs in restoring the supply of water, gas and electricity. Responsible for the quick recovery was the borough's new mayor, Martin Ohm (1895–1955), who also worked closely with the Soviet army to stock food depots and supply retailers. The Soviets had appointed him already on 29 April 1945, but the sacrifices were too big, so he was dismissed for health reasons only two months later. (Note: Ulrich Zawatka-Gerlach, "Politik ohne Nazis: Das leisteten Berlins erste Bezirksbürgermeister nach dem Krieg", Tagesspiegel, 10 May 2020. After Ohm, Neukölln was led by two appointed borough mayors in short succession, by provisional mayor Heinz Pagel, who had been second mayor under Ohm, from 15 October to 21 December 1945, and by Hermann Harnisch from January to October 1946. Neukölln's first regularly elected post-war borough mayor was Wilhelm Dieckmann from October 1946 until his untimely death in July 1947, followed by Richard Timm, who was elected in September 1947 and led the borough until October 1949, when he was reappointed to Berlin's magistrate as a labor arbitrator.) Following the withdrawal of the Soviet forces after the arrival of the United States Army on 12 July 1945, Neukölln became part of the American sector of Berlin until 1949. During the Berlin Blockade, West Berlin held the 1948 state election, and Neukölln's new representative assembly elected Kurt Exner mayor, who would lead the borough from 1949 to 1959 in the first stable administration after the war. The Cold War fully developed in 1949 after the blockade and the foundation of the Federal Republic of Germany, and Neukölln was now encompassing the south and south-east of West Berlin, an enclave of West Germany within Communist East Germany until German reunification in 1990. The Sonnenallee connected Neukölln with Baumschulenweg in East Berlin, and in 1961, the checkpoint would become an official border crossing of the Berlin Wall until 1989. (Note: The crossing was reserved for residents of West Berlin only; it featured prominently in the 1999 comedy film Sonnenallee by Leander Haußmann, Detlev Buck and Thomas Brussig.)

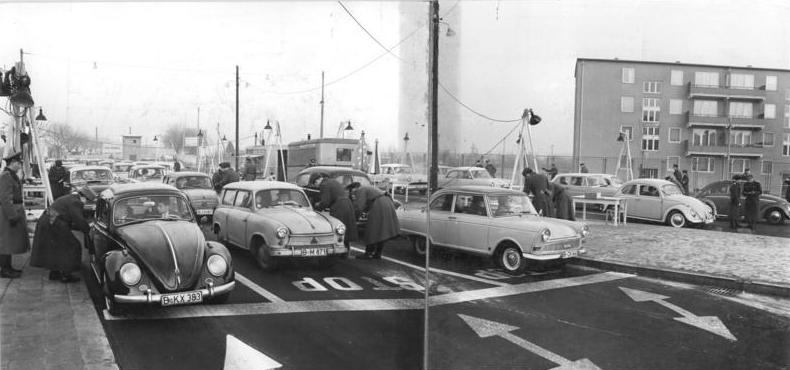
Sonnenallee border crossing, 1964

After a long war hiatus since 31 August 1944, Neukölln's daily newspaper Neuköllner Tageblatt returned to the newsstands on 28 May 1953, before being discontinued for good on 18 August of the same year due to low profits. On 2 October 1960, Neukölln's new borough library opened on Erlanger Straße, (Note: Today, the library is part of the Neukölln Arcaden mall; it was renamed Helene-Nathan-Bibliothek in 1989 in honor of Helene Nathan, the old borough library's Jewish director, who had been driven into suicide under Nazi oppression.) and the Heimatmuseum Neukölln moved into the library's former building on Ganghoferstraße. In 1963, the U-Bahn line C^{I} was extended from Grenzallee station further into the Britz quarter, eventually leading to Neukölln's last remaining tram line being shut down in 1966. (Note: Line 47 between Buschkrugallee and the so-called Rudow Spider had been in operation since 30 September 1913.) In 1965, Neukölln's professional association football club SC Tasmania 1900 Berlin was promoted from the Berlin conference of Germany's second league system directly to the Bundesliga for political reasons, (Note: Cold War politics had reserved a Bundesliga spot from the Berlin conference, but since Westend's Tennis Borussia Berlin, the actual winner of Berlin's second league, failed in the play-offs, and Spandauer SV declined the promotion, Tasmania 1900 was next in line and accepted the promotion two weeks before the start of the new season.) and in the 1965–66 season, the club only won two games and became the worst-performing club in Bundesliga history, a notorious record that stands to this day. (Note: Tasmania 1900 was relegated back to the second league and managed to reach the Bundesliga play-offs three times, but was eventually dissolved in July 1973 due to bankruptcy. To be able to absorb the failing club's young players, an unofficial successor club, SV Tasmania 73 Neukölln, had already been founded on 3 February 1973 and made its debut in the seventh league. For sponsorship reasons, the club was renamed SV Tasmania Gropiusstadt 73 in 2000, and since 2011 it performs under the name SV Tasmania Berlin. The club's nickname among locals is the feminine Die Tas ("the Tas"). After winning the 2025/26 northern conference of the north-eastern NOFV division in Germany's amateur fifth league (Oberliga), Tasmania was promoted to Germany's highest amateur league for the second time in its modern history after the club's brief stint in the 2021/22 season. During the 2026/27 season, Tasmania is again competing in the north-eastern division of Germany's fourth league, the Regionalliga. Like its defunct historical predecessor, the club plays its home matches at Neukölln's Werner-Seelenbinder-Sportpark.) In 1967, Europe's largest poultry farm, the so-called Hühnerhochhaus ("chicken high-riser") opened in Neukölln's industrial park Nobelstraße, but was closed down again in 1972 due to unprofitability, and after continuing animal rights protests, which evolved into the spearhead of sustainable and free-range farming in Germany. During the Cold War, Neukölln retained its status as a traditional working-class area and one of Berlin's red-light districts. Many gastarbeiters, especially from Turkey and Greece, settled in Kreuzberg and Neukölln since the 1950s, later followed by Palestinian and Arabic refugees from the Lebanese Civil War. Neukölln's current U-Bahn network into the southern quarters via the U7 was constructed between 1970 and 1972, while the final U8 section between Leinestraße and the S-Bahn wasn't implemented until 1996. The Körnerpark, which after the war had fallen into disrepair due to its location beneath the nearby airport's eastern approach and climb path, was restored in its historical form since 1977 and reopened to the public on 4 August 1983, with its orangerie following on 10 October of the same year. From 1981 to 1985, the Heimatmuseum Neukölln was reconceived under the administrative guidance of Dorothea Kolland to also focus on Neukölln's social and cultural history, including decentralized cultural projects all over the borough. The Neukölln Opera, which had originally been founded in 1972, received its own venue in 1988 and became one of Berlin's four opera houses. Another important cultural venue, the Saalbau Neukölln, the location of the former Bürgersalon Niesigk ("citizens' parlor"), reopened in 1990 and is today known as Heimathafen Neukölln.

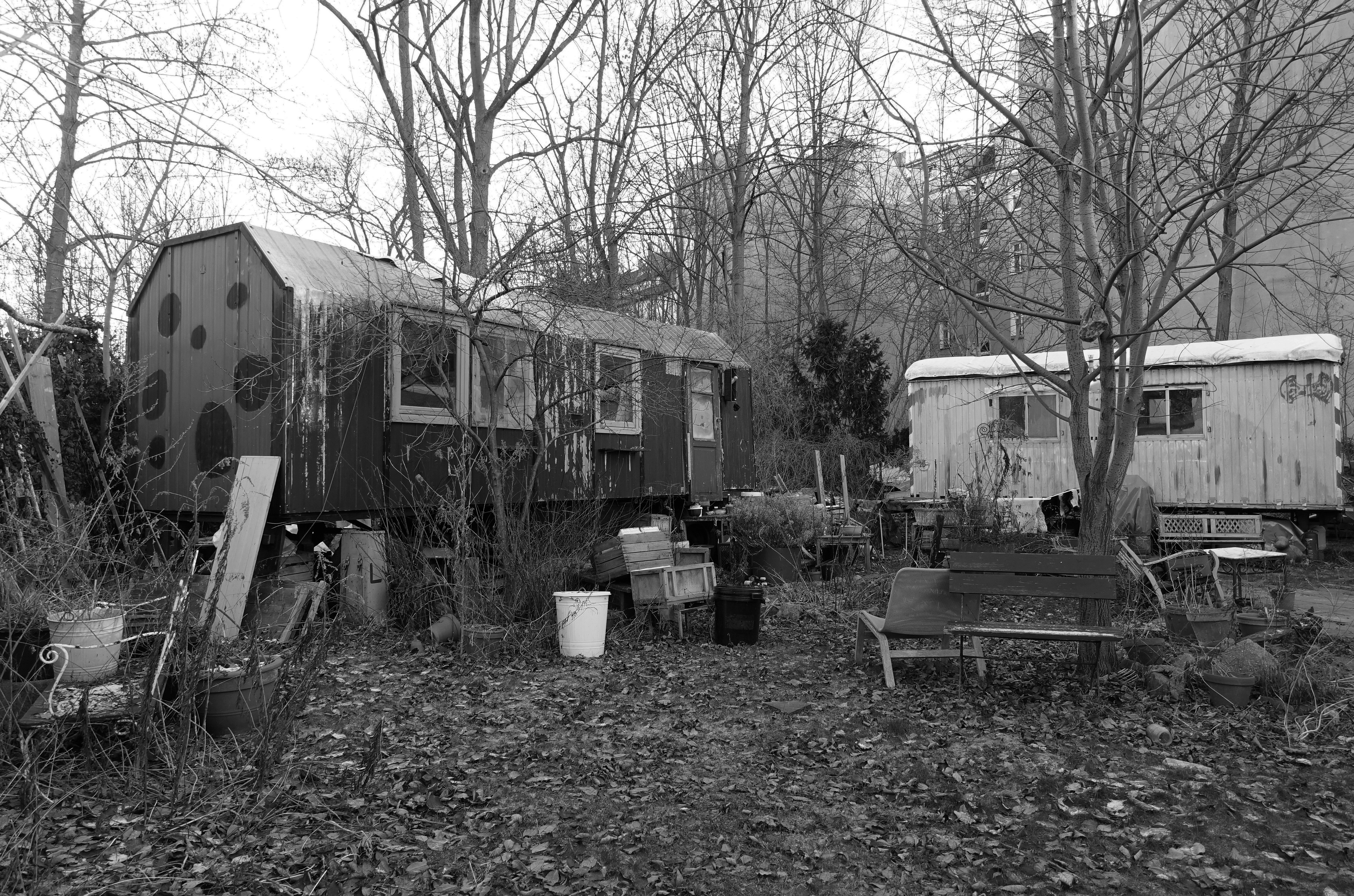
Rollheimer, Schillerkiez, 2024

Since the 1970s and '80s, Neukölln, like the neighboring Kreuzberg, has embraced independent forms of living like alternative trailer parks, for example the Rollheimer in the Schillerkiez, Germany's oldest Wagenburg, (Note: It was founded in 1981 and first occupied an area on Potsdamer Platz, before relocating to its lease on the Oderstraße in 1995; however, its lease was terminated at the end of 2023; Madlen Harbach, "Kündigung für Berlins ältestes Wagendorf: Wie geht es weiter mit den Neuköllner Rollheimern?", Tagesspiegel, 25 November 2023 (archived). One additional Wagenburg is the radical alternative queer trailer park Kanal, which has occupied a compound on the Neukölln side of Kiefholzstraße at the border to Plänterwald since 2010, though their domain had to be downsized by half for the new modular refugee center; the Wagenburg was formerly known as Schwarzer Kanal, and has existed in various inner-city locations since 1989.) squatting, (Note: Compared to Kreuzberg and the Eastern inner-city quarters of Berlin after German reunification, Neukölln has had far fewer squats. As of 2024, of the 21 squatted apartment houses and occupied undeveloped areas, only two houses remain, both of which have been occupied since 1981, a rear building on Karl-Marx-Straße and a building on Richardplatz, whose residents supported the Comenius Garden and cooperate in the historical forge on Richardplatz. Neukölln is furthermore home to several partially squatted houses, used e.g. for radical left stores, organizational offices or cultural venues, with notable examples from recent times being the Friedel54 on Friedelstraße (Reuterkiez), which was evicted under heavy protests in 2017, while the alternative pub Syndikat, which had been forcibly evicted in 2020 by a shell company of British William Pears Group from their home on Weisestraße (Schillerkiez), reopened in 2023 on Emser Straße (Rixdorf); cf. i.a. Ingo Salmen, Hasan Gökkaya & André Görke, "Friedel 54 in Berlin-Neukölln: Kiezladen nach Protesten an Gerichtsvollzieher übergeben", Tagesspiegel, 29 June 2017; Erik Peter, "Denen, die drin saufen", taz, 19 January 2023. For the history and an overview of Berlin's and Neukölln's squatting scene, see e.g. Toni Grabowsky (ed.), "berlin besetzt", Assoziation A, Berlin 2024.) and an often anti-establishment and anti-fascist counterculture that is still active to this day. In the 1990s, late repatriates from formerly Soviet states like Ukraine and Russia, including many Russian Jews, resettled in Germany, and especially in Berlin and Neukölln. An honorary statue of John Amos Comenius, who had been the last bishop of Rixdorf's Moravian colonists before their flight from Bohemia, was unveiled in Böhmisch-Rixdorf on 21 March 1992, followed on 15 November of the same year by the founding of the new German Comenius Society in Rixdorf's Moravian oratory. The decade after German reunification mainly transformed the eastern parts of the city, but western quarters like Neukölln were able to benefit as well. In 1994, the Estrel Hotel with convention center opened in Rixdorf's former industrial outskirts on the eastern shore of the Neukölln Ship Canal, and many new shopping malls and cultural locations sprung up all over Neukölln. In 1995, ethnologist Brigitte Walz and Anett Szabó developed the concept of a multiethnic carnival at Neukölln's transcultural Werkstatt der Kulturen, which became Berlin's famous Karneval der Kulturen one year later.

=== Modern neighborhood formation ===
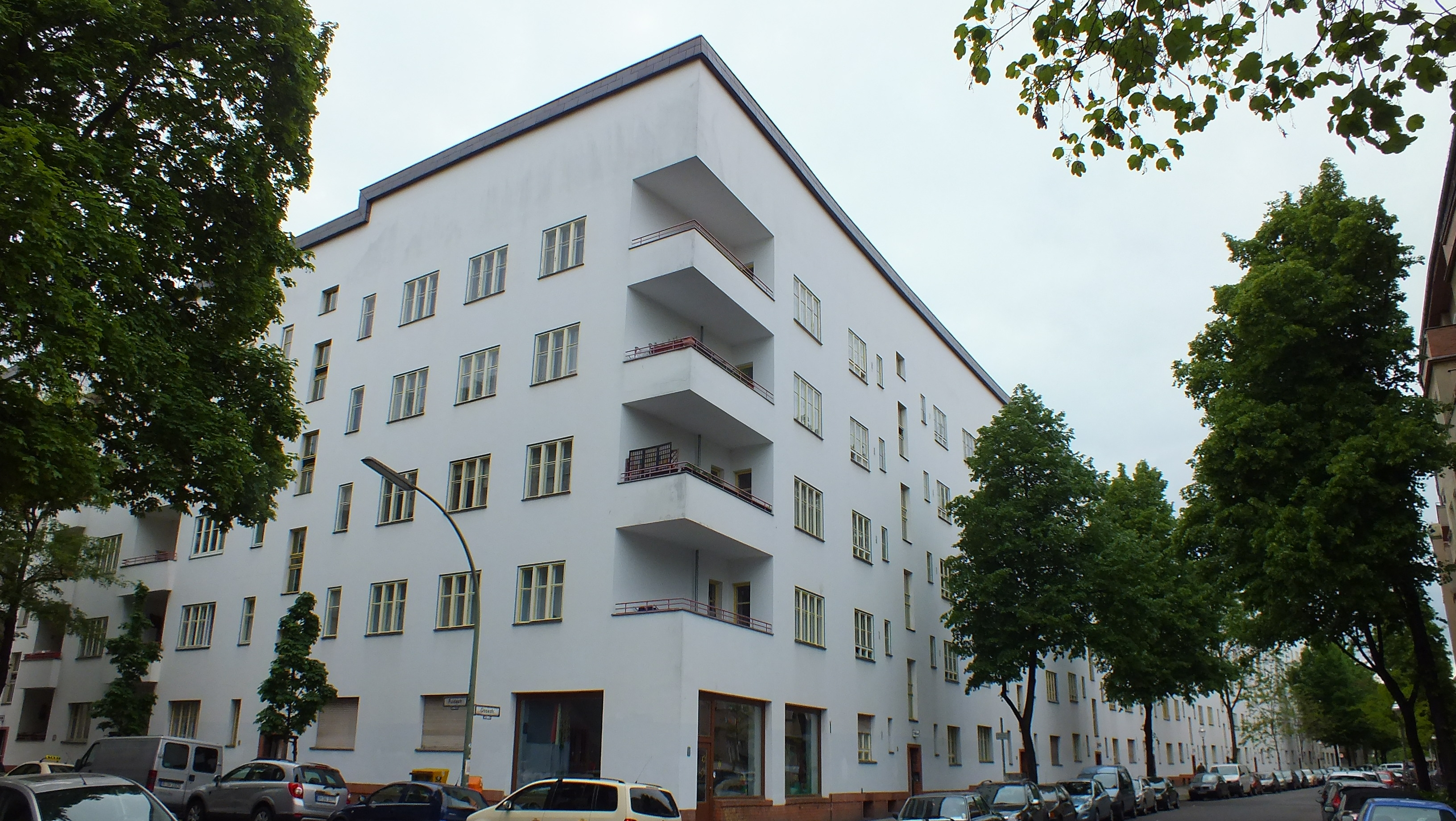
Neues Bauen at Ossastraße, Reuterkiez, 2014

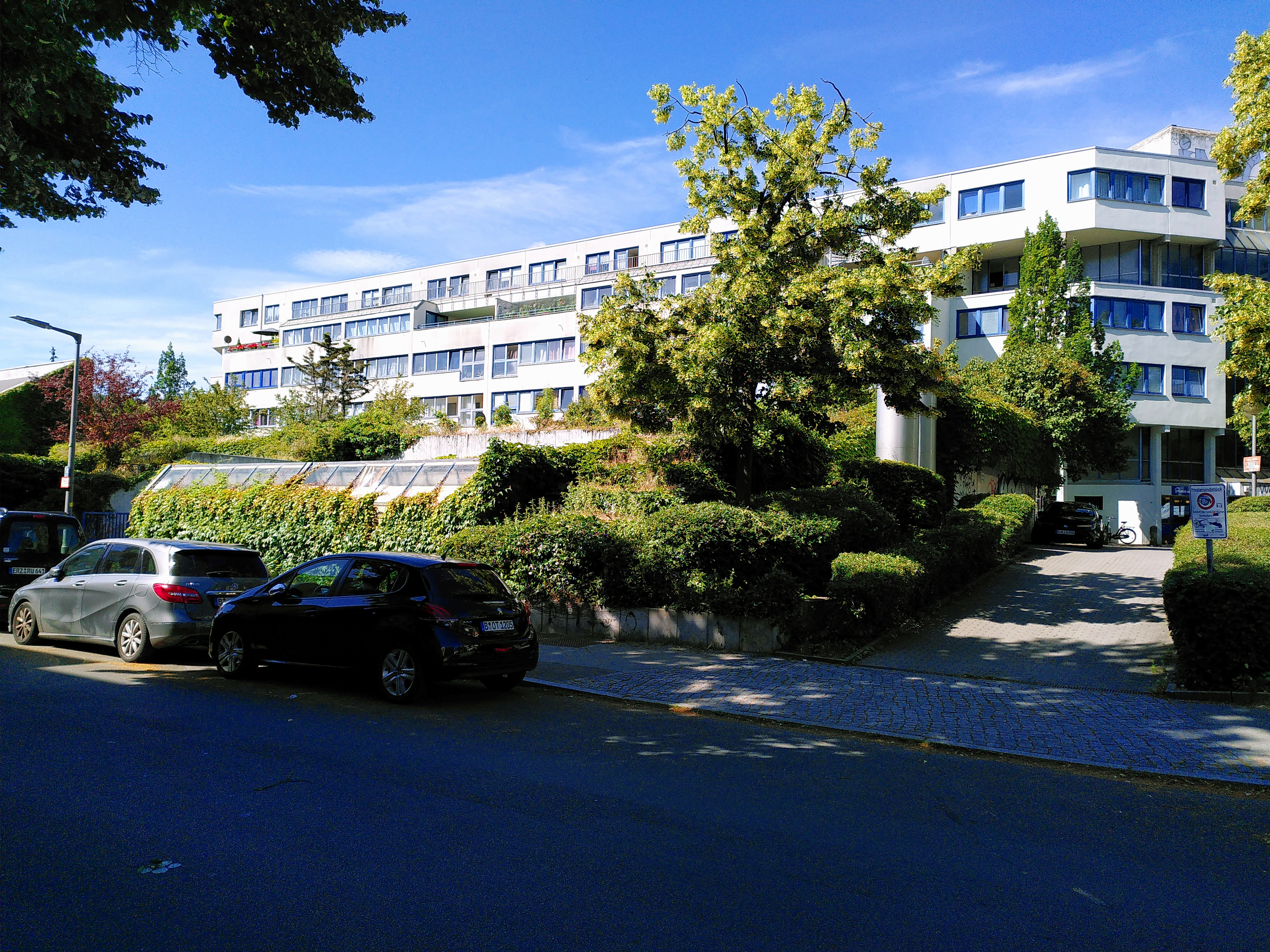
Die Ringe, Rollberg, 2024

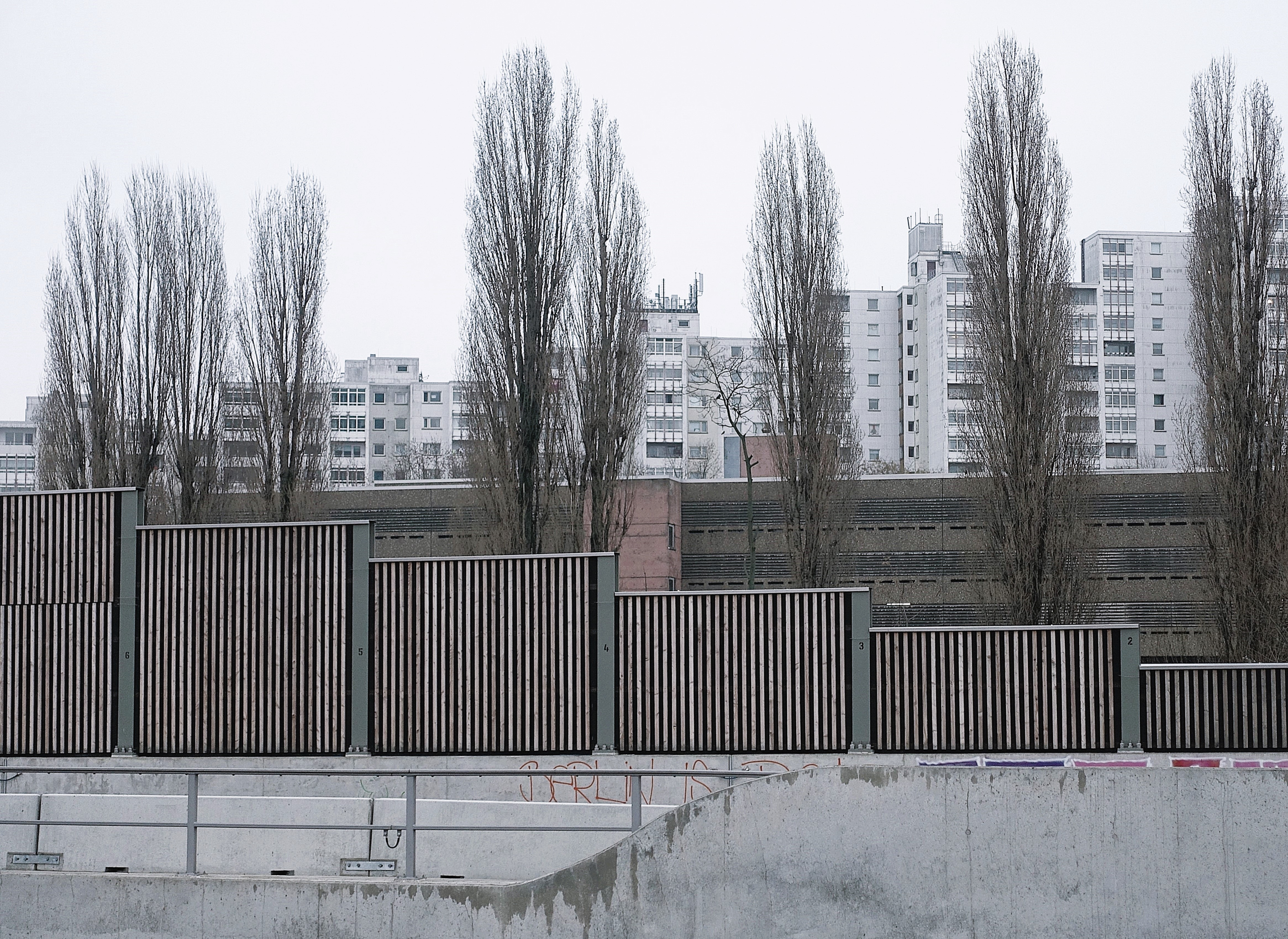
Weiße Siedlung, 2019

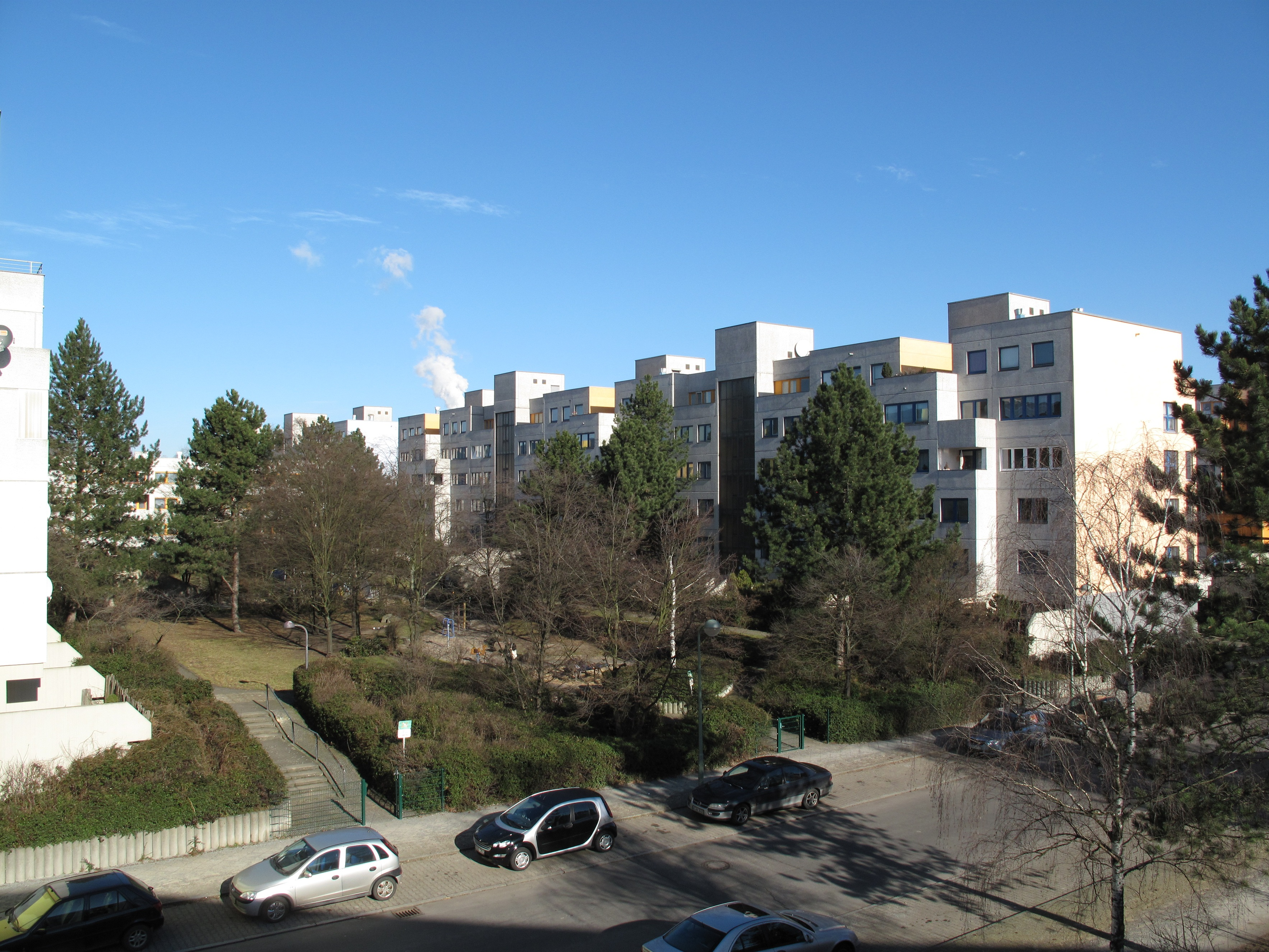
High-Deck-Siedlung, 2011

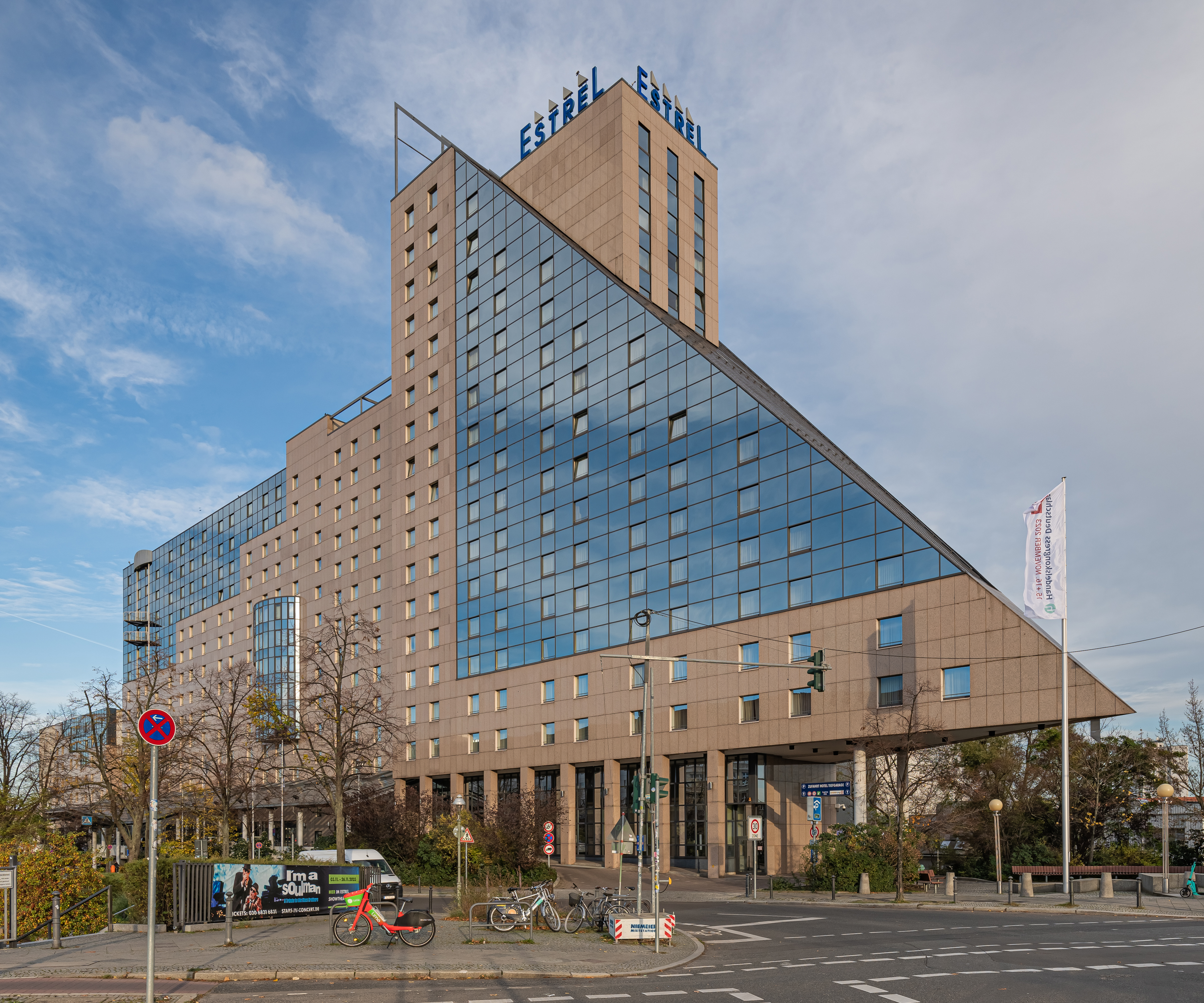
Estrel Convention Center, Rixdorf, 2023

Over the generations, all of Neukölln's southern neighborhoods of Rixdorf, Körnerpark and Schillerpromenade have gradually expanded south- and southeastward, while the Reuterkiez was finally expanded onto the marshy areas to the east. Major settlement constructions occurred as part of the new objective movement of the 1920s and '30s, in Germany often called Neues Bauen (New Building). In that era, many modern estates were constructed within Neukölln proper, for example the areas around Ossastraße, a 1927 Reuterkiez housing estate by Bruno Taut, or around the crossing of Innstraße and Weserstraße in Rixdorf (1924–26), but a notable example for a complete early modern settlement is the Dammwegsiedlung south-east of Rixdorf, which was constructed between 1920 and 1922, based on earlier designs by Reinhold Kiehl.

After World War II, almost a quarter of the buildings in Neukölln were destroyed or severely damaged. This affected all neighborhoods except the Schillerkiez, where the destruction remained minimal, though the quarter, like Körnerpark, was eventually expanded and compacted further south beyond the Ringbahn. Other neighborhoods quickly began to rebuild in the bombing gaps from the war, but naturally had to disregard the classical models of Neukölln's original architecture. Quick modern construction was the order of business, at best with a social reformist slant. In the 1960s, however, a public housing boom ensued in Berlin, which also changed the face of many parts of Neukölln's neighborhoods. Most older Gründerzeit areas were only expanded with compacting measures and discreet perimeter block development, but the bulk of Rollberg and the new quarters southeast of Rixdorf were built during this era.

Flächensanierung (district redevelopment) (Note: From a modern standpoint now derided as Kahlschlagsanierung (clear-cut redevelopment).) in the Rollberg neighborhood began in the 1960s, (Note: Berlin's first urban restructuring program of 1963 already included Rollberg as a redevelopment target, and the formal regulation was passed in 1972.) which meant completely demolishing and reconstructing most of its old working-class estates. Of Rollberg's more than 5,000 apartments, only about 340 remained, 200 of them in Gründerzeit estates, and 140 in existing houses from pre-war developments and initial post-war reconstructions. Furthermore, Berlin's historical grid plan street layout was partially dismantled. The modernist meandering block structures (Mäanderbauten) in the eastern part were constructed first, while the rest of the newly designed quarter, including Die Ringe ("The Rings") in the western part, was finished in the mid to late 1970s. Approximately 2,000 new apartments were constructed, but many of the original residents had left and never returned, opening up rental space for Neukölln's new immigrant population. These developments created new problems, which persist to this day, because the new neighborhood is neither urbanistically nor socially integrated with the rest of Neukölln.

During the same era, the Weiße Siedlung southeast of Rixdorf was built as a typical 1970s modernist suburban housing estate north of the older Dammwegsiedlung. Due to its distinctive high-rise design, the quarter is widely visible. Construction of the youngest neighborhood further south, the High-Deck-Siedlung, began in 1975 and ended in 1984 as a follow-up to the earlier large-scale housing developments Gropiusstadt and Märkisches Viertel. Both settlements suffer from a fate similar to that of Rollberg, being foreign architectural bodies with geographical and social separation from the rest of urban Neukölln.

After the end of Neukölln's public housing wave, the Schillerpromenade neighborhood at last became part of the borough's official urban renewal program, which was passed by the assembly of representatives on 23 January 1990. At first, the focus was on modernizing the deficits of the old infrastructure, but from 1996 onward, specific emphasis was placed on conservation and neighborhood management, to counter gentrification and the displacement of the old-established citizenry. This proved complicated, as many former tenements had already been converted into condominiums. In addition, more recent gentrification could not be blocked completely, since the neighborhood, beside the Reuterkiez, became one of the most popular destinations for 21st century western immigrants.

In contrast, conservation efforts had been placed on a more solid footing in the historical neighborhoods of Böhmisch-Rixdorf and Richardplatz-Süd. The new 1990 development procedures officially designated both the Bohemian and the contiguous German areas of Alt-Rixdorf as a Kulturdenkmal von europäischem Rang (cultural monument of European importance). This measure, which had been demanded since 1979 by Rixdorf's Bohemian descendants and supported by the local society Förderkreis Böhmisches Dorf since its foundation in 1984, has since preserved Rixdorf's old infrastructure and prevented any large-scale modern redevelopment.

==== Future residential development ====
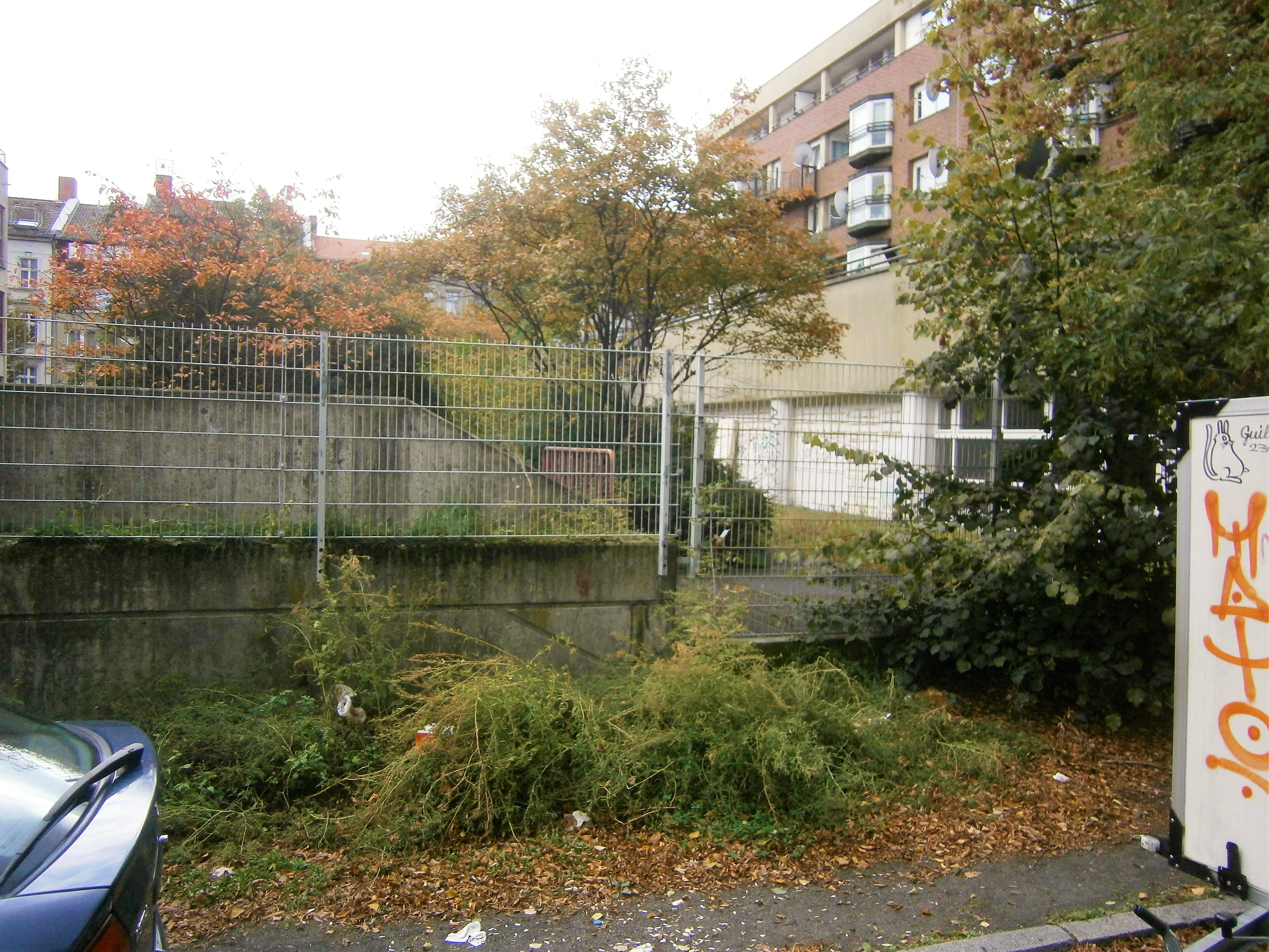
Undeveloped property, Rollberg

In the 21st century, further residential development in Neukölln is still possible by repurposing many of the garden allotments, the largest of which have primarily formed on or near the historical border to former East Berlin. However, important recreational areas would be lost, and there are no plans by the administration to let the relevant leases expire. Alternative plans to clear green spaces like the forest Emmauswald, a former cemetery, regularly encounter strong resistance, but the assembly of borough representatives generally favors a partial development of Neukölln's old cemeteries over nature conservation. Similarly, the plans for a residential boundary development of the Tempelhofer Feld are a recurring topic of contention in Berlin politics. Unconfrontational development mainly has to rely on compacting measures by covering the last remaining bombing gaps from World War II or undeveloped properties, on redeveloping former industrial neighborhoods like the Neukölln Docklands, (Note: E.g. the non-residential project DOXS NKLN; Dominik Bardow, "'Docks Neukölln': Das entsteht in Berlins neuem Hafenviertel", Berliner Zeitung, 13 June 2023 (archived).) and on perimeter block development, where possible. A recent example can be found in the Harzer Kiez, where the mainly industrial block Harzer Straße/Elsenstraße will be undergoing residential redevelopment. (Note: The infrastructure is currently used by i.a. film industry laboratories and studios; cf. "Hier plant der Berliner Senat plant elf neue Wohngebiete", Berliner Zeitung, 29 May 2018, s.v. "Neukölln, Harzer Straße". However, other new developments are (as of 2025) only under way in the southern quarters of the Neukölln borough, namely in Alt-Britz, the old village center of Britz, and especially the housing estate Buckower Felder in the far south of Buckow I with 900 new apartments; cf. Teresa Roelcke, "Tausende Wohnungen neu gebaut: In diesen Quartieren können Berliner bald ein neues Zuhause finden", Tagesspiegel, 10 May 2025 (archived).)

=== Berlin-Neukölln in the 21st century ===
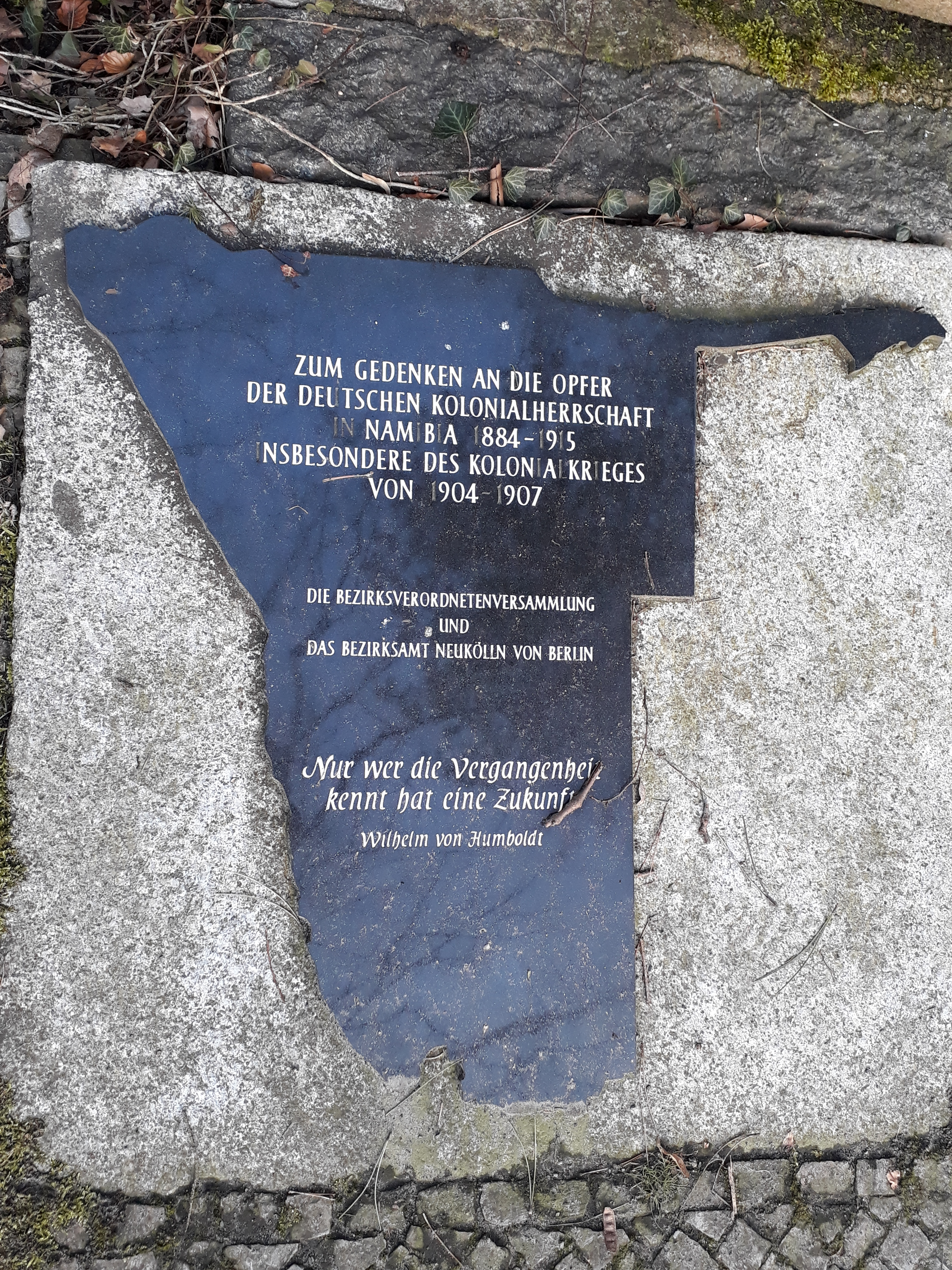
Memorial for the victims of German colonial rule in Namibia

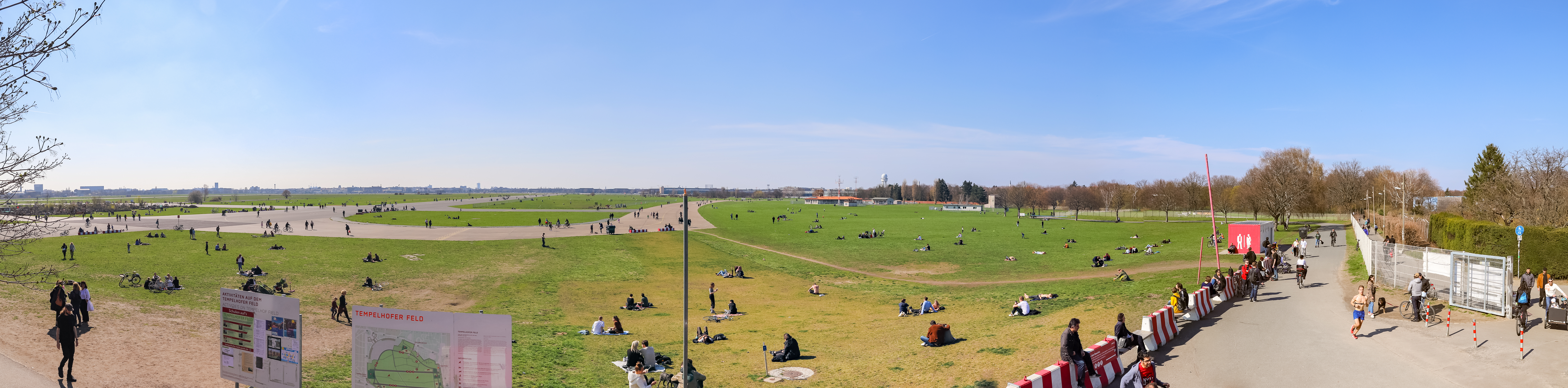
Tempelhofer Feld, Neukölln, 2019

As part of Berlin's administrative reform, the city's 14th borough Neukölln was reorganized as the 8th borough of Berlin on 1 January 2001. (Note: Gropiusstadt, originally just a large suburban housing estate in Britz, Rudow and mainly Buckow, was declared an official quarter and joined the borough a year later, which split the Buckow quarter in half.) In 2002, the final restoration stage concluded at the Körnerpark with the reopening of the park's cascade and adjacent water passages. In 2009, the 1907 Hererostein on the grounds of the Columbiadamm cemetery, which honors seven volunteer soldiers who between 1904 and 1907 had fallen while serving in the Imperial Schutztruppe of German South West Africa, was augmented with a plaque commemorating the victims of German colonialism in Namibia, including those of the Colonial War, which resulted in the Herero and Nama genocide, until now the only memorial of its kind in Berlin. The closedown of Tempelhof Airport on 30 October 2008 had relieved many of Neukölln's central residential areas, which had been located beneath the airport's eastern approach path, of aircraft noise, especially Körnerpark and the Schillerkiez. In 2010, the Museum Neukölln, after its 2004 renaming from Heimatmuseum Neukölln, was relocated from the quarter Neukölln to Schloss Britz. In the same year, the city opened the Tempelhofer Feld to the public, the former airfield, which had been shared by the quarters Neukölln and Tempelhof. (Note: It was at first called Tempelhofer Freiheit (Tempelhof Liberty), and officially designated Tempelhofer Feld on 14 June 2014; many Berliners simply call it das Feld ("the field").) Over night, this created a new and unique area for recreation, sporting activities, small and large cultural events like Lollapalooza, sustainability projects and natural habitats for many wild species. During the 2020–23 COVID-19 pandemic, Neukölln was one of the early hotspots of Germany, resulting in more than 600 fatalities. (Note: The mortality rate was approximately 0.5%, with more than 40% of the population infected; "Aktuelle Corona Inzidenz von Berlin Neukölln", Corona-Zahlen heute, 23 September 2024; this was mainly a consequence of the quarter's larger share of immigrants and people in poverty, and the associated lower educational level; Benjamin Hirsch, "Corona und der Migrationshintergrund: In Neukölln zeigt sich wahre Dimension des Problems", Focus, 16 April 2021.) On 27 August 2025 and after more than ten years of construction, the first of two eastern extensions of the autobahn A 100 through Neukölln to Alt-Treptow opened to the public, including an additional direct connection to the quarter with exits and on-ramps at Sonnenallee.

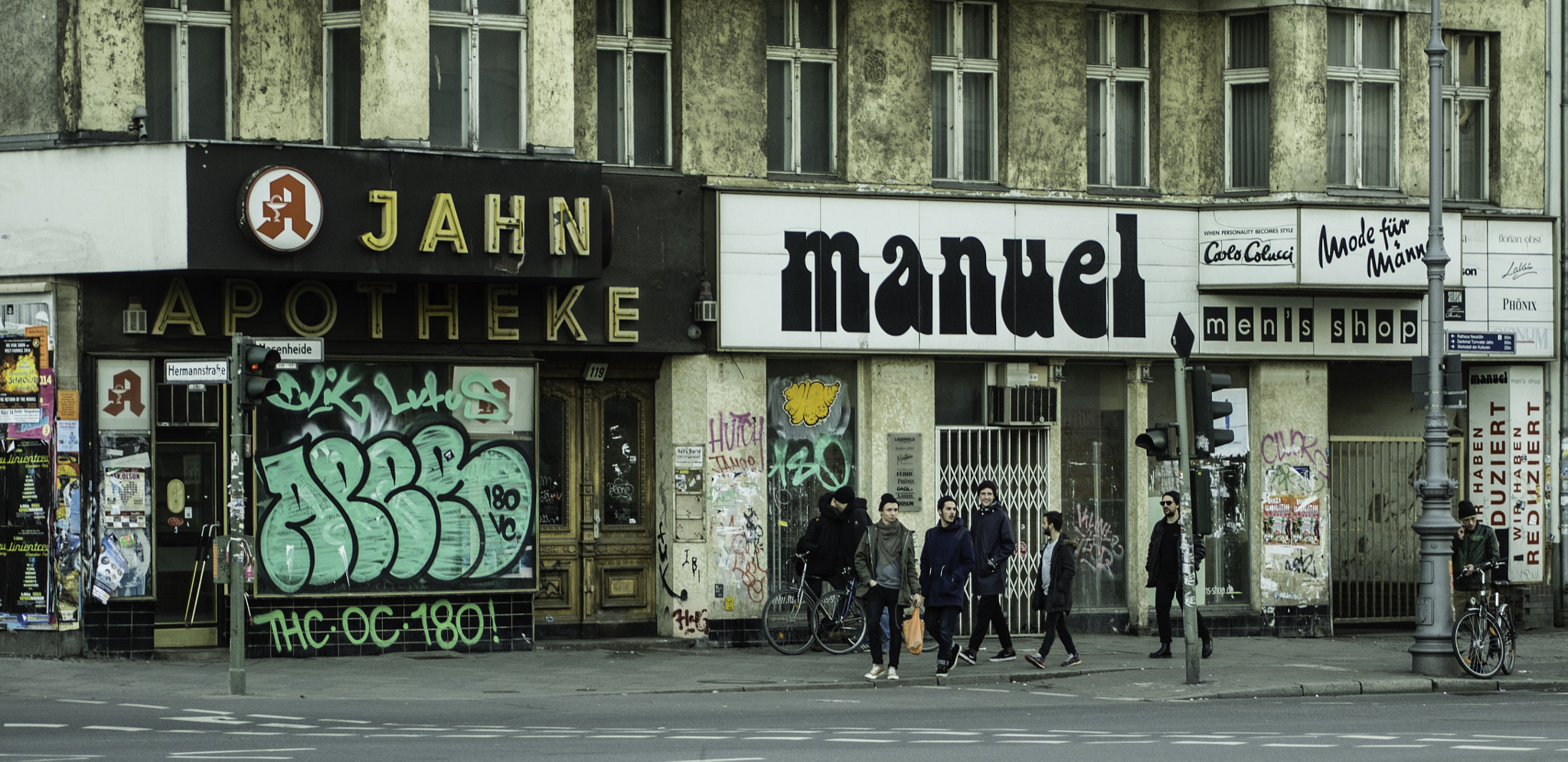
Urban hotspot Neukölln before gentrification: the "Haunted House on Hermannplatz", 2014 (Note: Karl Grünberg, "Das Geisterhaus vom Hermannplatz", Tip, January 2014; "Das Geisterhaus vom Hermannplatz", Berliner Kurier, 14 March 2016. The so-called Geisterhaus ("haunted house") at Hasenheide 119, which had been abandoned since 2012, was originally owned by Rixdorf's Bohemian Barta family (see above), but was eventually sold and completely renovated in 2020.)

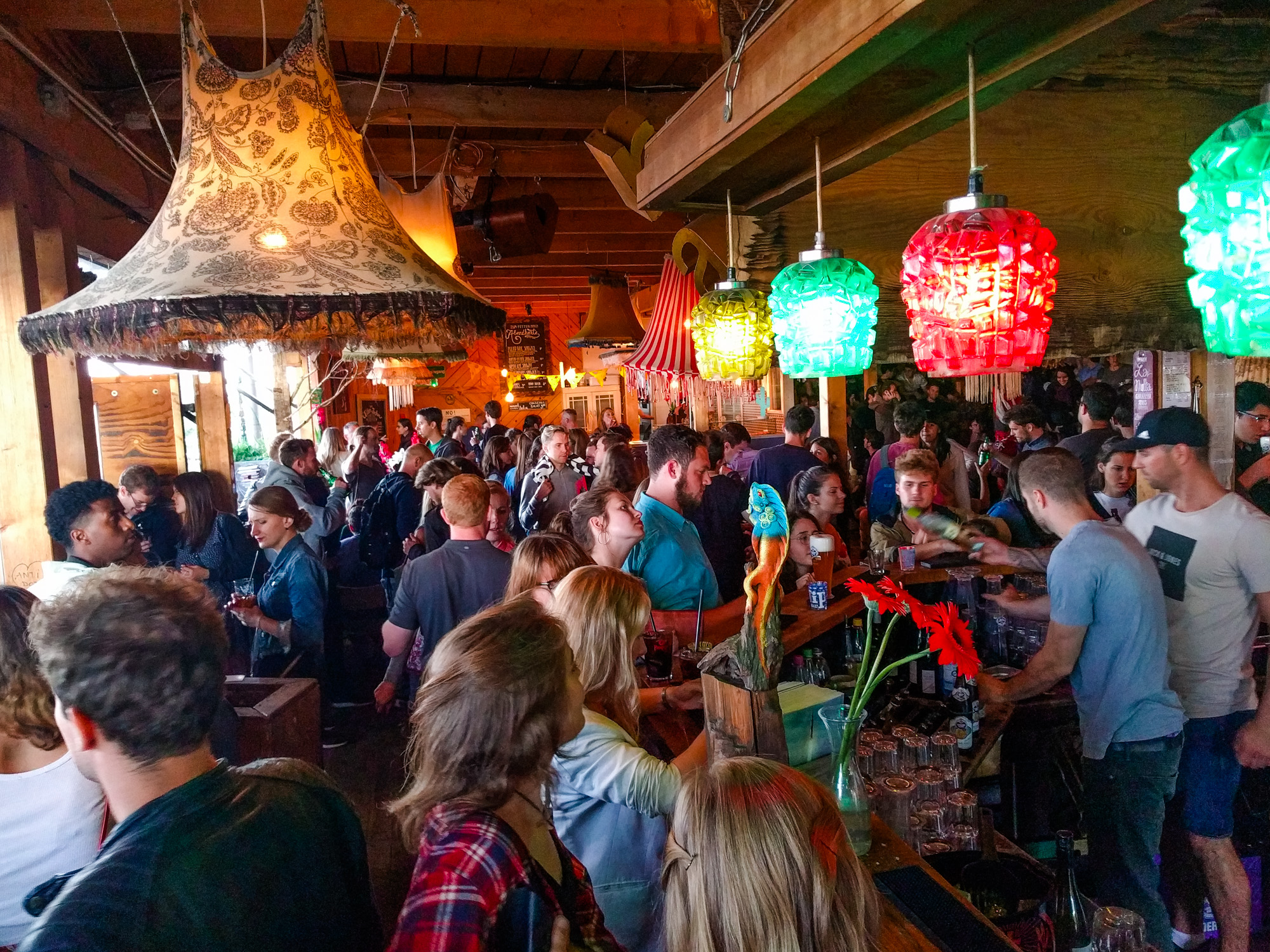
Rooftop bar Klunkerkranich at the Neukölln Arcaden, Karl-Marx-Straße, 2017

Following the 1990s as a typical inner-city hot spot with high rates of immigration, poverty, crime, educational discrimination (Note: At the time, former borough mayor Heinz Buschkowsky had named Neukölln as an example for the "failed multicultural society" (Tijs van den Boomen, "Die unsichtbare Mauer", Der Spiegel, 21 August 2011), and judge Kirsten Heisig et al. initiated the so-called Neukölln Model for swift criminal prosecution of juvenile delinquents (Jutta Schütz, "Neuköllner Modell – schnelle Strafen für junge Täter", Die Welt, 6 April 2010).) and inadequate asylum laws, early 21st century Neukölln had experienced an influx of students, creatives and other young professionals of mostly Western origin avoiding higher rents charged in other parts of Berlin. It was during this time that the informal cultural toponym Kreuzkölln developed, as the northern neighborhood's culture and nightlife was slowly being resurrected, (Note: Neukölln's initial mid-2000s gentrifying wave eventually attracted an ever increasing number of young new residents, and enticed Berliners to favorably compare the up-and-coming new north of Neukölln with the culturally more established Kreuzberg (Christine Eichelmann, "Ein Berliner Kiez erwacht zu neuem Leben", Welt, 15 June 2007). The new berolinistic toponym Kreuzkölln was at first dismissed by many long-term residents on both sides of the border (Johanna Lühr, "Stadtleben: Auf lässige Nachbarschaft", Tagesspiegel, 25 October 2008), mainly due to the different history and urban characteristics of the two quarters, which at the time were still very much unequal, with Kreuzberg either more middle-class (Kreuzberg 61) or still strongly influenced by the traditional alternative counterculture of Cold War West Berlin (SO 36), who viewed the toponym as a signifier of the ensuing gentrification, vis-à-vis the Reuterquartier's emerging alternative hipster subculture, whose comparison to the heydey of the Lower East Side was both approved and derided by culturally progressive commentators and radical left-wing traditionalists respectively (Jacek Slaski, "Nord Neukölln: Spielplatz Avantgarde", tip, 18 May 2010 archived; Ingo Arend, "Kultur-Karawane in Neu-Arabien", Deutschlandfunk, 11 August 2010). Today, after many years of cross-border gentrification, Kreuzkölln is, if at all, mostly used by new residents and younger natives. It describes the Reuterkiez and the adjacent city blocks of Kreuzberg 61 and SO 36, which together have now formed an almost fully integrated, albeit gentrified, urban cultural sphere (Johannes Schneider, "Sagt endlich Kreuzkölln!", Tagesspiegel, 12 April 2016).) beginning in 2001 in the Friedelkiez with the Kulturverein Kinski, and soon spreading to the Weserkiez. (Note: For a report on the early trends in the Reuterkiez, including the Friedel- and Weserkiez, cf. Nicholas Brautlecht, "Nachts in Neukölln-Nord", Berliner Zeitung, 23 August 2007.) The trend increased with the 2008 financial crisis and Euro area crisis, when many young EU citizens left their home countries for Germany in search of work, leading to rapid cultural shifts in certain neighborhoods within Neukölln, especially the neighborhoods to the north and west from Reuter- to Schillerkiez. Coupled with increasing domestic and foreign real estate investments, this had caused a knock-on effect of rents to rise in many parts of Neukölln. Gentrification eventually stalled in the early 2020s, (Note: As of 2017, in Berlin-Neukölln "the [gentrification] boom [was] in full swing or, in some places, complete (no more big hikes in rent here)"; cf. Meier J, RealXData. 2019. "Zeitraum Mietentwicklungen 2013–2017". In: Bruns H. 2019. "At A Glance: Which Berlin Districts are Going to Get More Expensive". B.Z. – Berliner Zeitung. 19 November 2019.) but since then, rent inflation has also shifted from residential to commercial real estate, which now threatens to favor corporatized lighthouse projects over Neukölln's smaller entrepreneurs and traditional businesses, who were initially saved by the federal stimulus during the COVID-19 lockdowns. (Note: Unlike the so-called Mietpreisbremse (lit. "brake on rent prices"), there is no federal law in Germany that moderates and slows the increase of commercial leases, and this has begun to affect Neukölln; Madlen Haarbach, "Steigende Preise, leerstehende Räume", 13 June 2024 (archived).)

The gentrifying migration, together with later migrational waves after the Russian invasion of Ukraine and primarily the ongoing European migrant crisis from mainly Islamic countries, (Note: Due to the recent cultural changes induced by modern Muslim immigration, the Sonnenallee is also called Arabische Straße (شارع العرب, Shari’ al-‘Arab, Arab Street), similar to the Bohemian migrants calling Böhmisch-Rixdorf Český Rixdorf (Czech Rixdorf) three centuries earlier. Before 2015, Berliners called the street or its vicinity Gazastreifen (Gaza Strip) or Klein-Beirut (Little Beirut); Sa′ed Atshan, Katharina Galor, The Moral Triangle: Germans, Israelis, Palestinians, Durham 2020, p. 131; Gunda Bartels, " Stadtführung: Und immer blubbert die Wasserpfeife", Tagesspiegel, 30 June 2007; "Berlin’s 'Arab Street' Offers Syrian Refugees a Space For Memories", Syrian Observer, 14 March 2016; Al-Habbal (2007) in: Nazeeha Saeed, "The Arabs of Berlin face generations laden with guilt and trauma", in: Hanan Badr, Nahed Samour (eds.), Arab Berlin – Dynamics of Transformation, Bielefeld 2023, p. 63–82 (69); Miriam Stock, "The tastes of Arab Berlin – Manifestations of Arab snack culture in the changing urban migration regime of Berlin", in: ibid., p. 169–187 (passim); see also Berolinism.) have significantly increased Neukölln's population since the 2010s, also spawning social and religious conflicts in some neighborhoods, shifting the political climate to the right across Germany, with Neukölln remaining a symbol of societal decline. (Note: For some modern authors, mirroring the criticism from almost two decades prior, Neukölln today still serves as a prime example of a society burdened by immigration and dwindling fiscal resources; cf. Falko Liecke, Brennpunkt Deutschland: Armut, Gewalt, Verwahrlosung – Neukölln ist erst der Anfang, Berlin/Cologne 2022.) However, Neukölln's partly precarious demographic makeup also led to a contrarian landslide victory in the 2025 German federal election for the socialist party Die Linke and Ferat Koçak, who became the first ever direct socialist representative of a West German electoral district. (Note: Owen Jones, "The AfD are circling like vultures. But in Berlin, I found a new, young left rising against them", The Guardian, 3 March 2025. Party members perceived the win as a vote against the increasing right-wing trend and anti-immigration sentiment in Germany (Pascal Beucker, David Muschenich, Franziska Schindler, Lotte Laloire, Stefan Reinecke, "Wenn die Linke 139.000-mal klingelt", taz, 24 February 2025), while conservative commentators wrote that Koçak's and his party's anti-police, Pro-Palestinian, anti-zionist and sometimes antisemitic views managed to secure the victory with votes from Neukölln's Muslim population (Gunnar Schupelius, "So will die Linkspartei in Berlin an die Macht", B.Z., 13 May 2025; Janne Hoppe, "Erdrutschsieg in Neukölln – Polizei- und Israelkritiker zieht für die Linke in den Bundestag", Welt, 26 February 2025). Koçak himself stated that he was annoyed by this categorization, referring to Neukölln's large expat and often disenfranchised Palestinian population, and to his duty to make politics for all residents, while striving for reconciliation and cooperation; Ferat Koçak in: Alice von Lenthe, Wiebke Hollersen, "Linker Wahlsieger in Neukölln: Ferat Koçak über Antisemitismusvorwürfe", Berliner Zeitung, 3 March 2025 (archived).) The electorate had broken with the borough's secular centrist voting behavior, and returned Neukölln to its historical pre-war socialist roots. While the borough's southern quarters mostly still voted conservative, the victory was secured by the electorate in the quarter of Neukölln. Here, the vibrant immigrant culture and recent cosmopolitan evolution, especially in the northern neighborhoods, have consistently defied the more dire academic theories of a fundamental social polarization in Neukölln. Over the years, the quarter has retained its special role as a centuries-old industrious melting pot, which has now also become one of the trendiest and most diverse districts of Berlin, and, for better or worse, the epitome of socioeconomic change in the city. Accordingly, the quarter and its streets have often ranked as some of the world's most desirable places to visit and live.

== Coat of arms ==
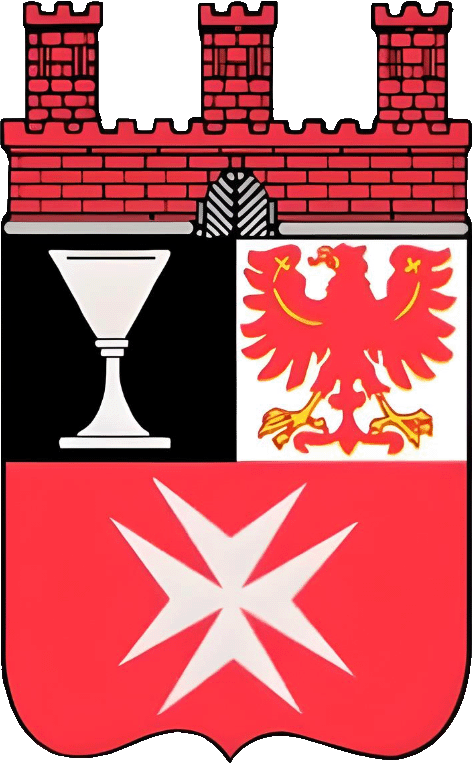
Rixdorf

Neukölln

Maltese cross

Eagle (Note: This specific coat of arms belonged to Friedrichswerder, Cölln's oldest district outside of the colony's historical boundary; Brandenburg and many other historical localities of Berlin also used Cölln's variant of the single-headed Holy Roman eagle in their coat of arms.)

Hussite flag with chalice

Mural crown of Berlin's boroughs

Berlin

Neukölln's coat of arms is a modern variant of Rixdorf's original shield. After Rixdorf's independence on 1 April 1899, the city's first coat of arms had been commissioned on 10 November of the same year. The final design, which swapped the placement of the cross and chalice, was ordered by emperor Wilhelm II and approved on 29 May 1903.

The most prominent element on Neukölln's shield is in the bottom field, the escutcheon with the silver on red Maltese cross, which signifies the official foundation of the historic village of Richardsdorf on 26 June 1360 under the sovereignty of the Catholic Johannite Knights Hospitaller, who had assumed the angerdorf from the Knights Templar in the year 1318. In the upper right charge is the red and gold heraldic right-facing eagle on silver background, which is actually a double reference, mainly to Rixdorf's feudal parent city of Cölln (23 September 1435 – 17 January 1709 (Note: At first, Rixdorf existed in a shared fiefdom of Cölln and Alt-Berlin, and became the sole fief of Cölln on 24 August 1543 (see above).)), but also to the later Province of Brandenburg, which likewise used Cölln's historical eagle on its coat of arms. In the upper left field is the silver on black common chalice of the Protestant Hussite colonists, who began to settle on the Rixdorf lot in the year 1737 and eventually built their own village, which as Böhmisch-Rixdorf was granted its own administration in 1797, before both Rixdorf villages were united on 1 January 1874. (Note: An architectural representation of Rixdorf's historical Hussite chalice can be found in the pediment of the 1753 Bohemian school building on Kirchgasse.) The original coronet with the mural crown, consisting of a city wall with three towers made of red bricks with black seams, was similar to the modern variant, but contained a city gate as its central element, signifying Rixdorf's 1899 independence.

Unofficially, the historical coat of arms remained in use at first, after Rixdorf, then already renamed Neukölln, had joined the new Neukölln borough of Greater Berlin on 1 October 1920. On 13 May 1954, however, Berlin passed legislation which allowed its boroughs to carry official heraldic emblems. To this end, Rixdorf's old coat of arms was slightly redesigned, altered from the French to Berlin's official Iberian form, and the only major elemental change was applied to the coronet, which was replaced by the new mural crown now used by all of Berlin's boroughs, including the silver shield with right-facing black bear, as found in Berlin's own coat of arms. The changes were approved by Neukölln's district office and representative assembly by 12 March 1956. The new coat of arms was admitted by the city of Berlin in April 1956 and awarded to the borough Neukölln on 16 May 1956. Therefore, it is now used not only by the quarter of Neukölln, but also by the borough's other quarters of Britz, Buckow, Rudow and Gropiusstadt.

== Historical population numbers ==
Around the time of Rixdorf's unification in 1874, the population was approximately 12,300. After Rixdorf's independence in 1899, the population stood at 90,422 (1900), while the final count for the rechristened city of Neukölln was 262,414 (1919), mainly due to early modern industrial immigration. The largest ever population of the quarter Neukölln was 278,208 in 1930. Modern immigration began in the mid-2000s and accounted for a population increase of approximately 20,000 at its peak in 2015, declining to now 12,000 compared to the beginning of the millennium.

Population of the early settlements Richardsdorf, Ricksdorf and Rixdorf (1200–1736)
Year	Population (Note: Early population statistics do not exist; these numbers are approximations, taken from various historical sources.)	Toponym	Notes
1200	20	Richardsdorf	Knights Templar military stronghold
1245	30	Richardsdorf	demilitarized Templar manor
1360	50	Richardsdorf	Knights Hospitaller angerdorf; 14 farmers and families
1375	40	Richardsdorf	12 farmers and families
1624	150	Ricksdorf	fief of Cölln
1652	20	Ricksdorf	Thirty Years' War and Second plague pandemic; 7 farmers and families
1734	224	Rixdorf	treasury village of Berlin

Population of the two Rixdorf villages Deutsch- and Böhmisch-Rixdorf (1737–1873)
Year	Deutsch-Rixdorf	Böhmisch-Rixdorf	Total	Notes
1747	210	300	510	approximate; first Bohemian settlement in 1737
1771	200	350	550	approximate
1805	376	319	695	Böhmisch-Rixdorf (1797 administration)
1840	2,146	520	2,666	
1858	3,077	1,014	4,091	
1867	5,007	1,506	6,513	
1871	5,996	2,129	8,125	start of industrial immigration

Population of the unified and later independent Rixdorf and Neukölln (1874–1919)
Year	Population	Notes
1874	12,300	approximate; Rixdorf unification
1875	15,328	
1880	18,729	
1887	30,000	approximate
1890	35,702	
1895	59,945	
1900	90,422	independent city (1899)
1905	153,572	
1910	237,289	peak of industrial immigration
1912	253,000	approximate; renamed Neukölln
1919	262,128	final census (8 October 1919)
1919	262,414	population at year's end

Population of the quarter Neukölln in the Neukölln borough (1920–2000)
Year	Population	Notes
1925	271,658	borough formation (1 October 1920)
1930	278,208	quarter's highest ever population count
1935	248,658	
1938	242,704	
1946	213,486	World War II (1939–45)
1950	222,533	
1960	199,097	
1970	159,362	
1987	139,930	
1995	158,436	German reunification (1990)
2000	146,522	

Population of the quarter Neukölln in the Neukölln borough (21st century)
Year	Population	Notes
2007	149,466	start of modern immigration
2010	154,066	
2015	168,035	2015 European migrant crisis
2020	164,636	
2025	163.184	

== See also ==
- History of the borough Neukölln
  - History of Britz
  - History of Gropiusstadt
  - History of Buckow
  - History of Rudow
- History of Berlin
- Timeline of Berlin
- History of Germany
