= Felix Lobrecht =

German comedian and author (born 1988)

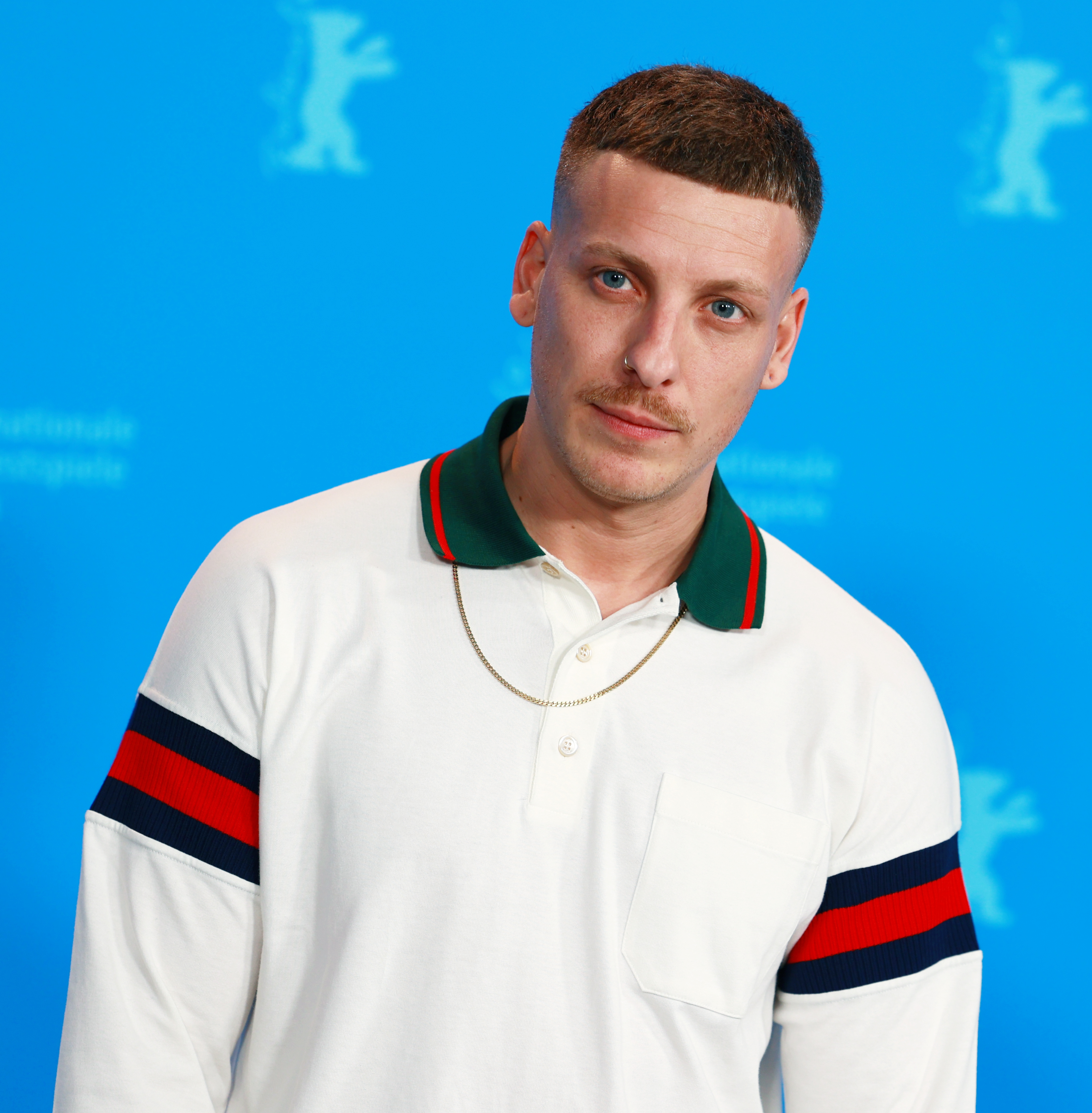
- Lobrecht at the Berlinale in 2023.
- Born: 24 December 1988 (age 37); Mettingen, North Rhine-Westphalia, Germany
- Other name: Azzle 447
- Occupations: Stand-up comedian; Podcaster; Disc jockey; Author
- Years active: 2015–present
- Employer(s): 1LIVE (2019–present); ARD (2023–present)

Felix Manuel Lobrecht (German: [ˈfe:lɪks ˈma:nuεl ˈlo:pʁεçt, -e:l]; born 24 December 1988) is a German comedian, podcast host, record producer, disc jockey and author.

== Life and education ==
Lobrecht was born in Mettingen, North Rhine-Westphalia. After his mother died of breast cancer in 1993, his then-single father Frank moved him and his two siblings, Julian and Sophie, to Berlin. Lobrecht grew up in the neighbourhood of Gropiusstadt in the Berlin borough of Neukölln.

In 2001, he began attending the Hannah-Arendt-Gymnasium in the Neukölln neighbourhood of Rudow. He was expelled in 2003 due to bad behavior. He then attended the Clay-Gesamtschule where he graduated with a Realschulabschluss in 2005. After that, he worked at a gym and a plants‘ wholesale. In 2008, he graduated with the German ״Fachhochschulreife". In 2012, he passed the Abitur exams, which he studied for by himself without attending school. In the meantime, Lobrecht had dropped out of an apprenticeship to become an industrial clerk and journalism studies. In the winter semester of 2012/13, he started studying political science and economics at the University of Marburg. In 2016, he started attending the University of Potsdam. He took a break from attending university before continuing his studies at the University of Marburg in the summer semester of 2021.

Lobrecht lives in the Berlin district of Kreuzberg at Kottbusser Tor.

== Career ==
Lobrecht first gained recognition as a poetry slammer and, from 2015, as a comedian. Since 2017, Lobrecht no longer performs as a poetry slammer and only as a comedian. He toured Germany, Austria, and Switzerland. On stage, he mostly tells absurd stories of everyday life garnished with bad puns and long pauses. He often uses words or phrases in Berlin dialect.

He became famous through appearances on TV shows like the Köln Comedy Nacht XXL 2016 and Comedy Champions 2016 on RTL Zwei. His first live tour was called Kenn ick! ("I’m familiar" in Berlin German). Until 2020, he toured with his second show called Hype and appeared at comedy events like the 1LIVE-Hörsaal-Comedy or the TV show Nuhr ab 18 by Dieter Nuhr.

His first book is called 10 Minuten? Dit sind ja 20 Mark! ("10 minutes? That’s 20 Mark!" in Berlin German). It was written in collaboration with poetry slammer Malte Rosskopf and was published by the Satyr Verlag in October 2015. Lobrecht's second book Sonne und Beton ("Sun and Concrete") was published by the Ullstein Verlag on March 10, 2017. In this book, he tells stories and anecdotes inspired by his childhood and growing up in Neukölln and Gropiusstadt. In February 2023, a movie of the same name -based on the book- was released at the Berlinale. The screenplay was written by Lobrecht and the director David Wnendt.

Since September 2017, Lobrecht and the author and TV host Tommi Schmitt have released a weekly podcast called Gemischtes Hack. The podcast is available on Spotify exclusively since September 2019. The title has several meanings: It translates to "mixed ground meat", which usually contains pork and beef in Germany. The two podcast hosts are like pork and beef in the sense of that their different biographical backgrounds contribute to the overall character of the podcast. The word Hack also alludes to life hacks which are often the topic of the podcast. Lobrecht and Schmitt also had a show on 1LIVE in 2019. It was called Was machen Sachen? ("What do things do?"). In the show, Lobrecht and Schmitt answer absurd questions. The show was published on YouTube on a weekly basis.

From October 2019 until September 2021, 1LIVE published 38 episodes in the category Wie geht? ("How does it work?") starring Lobrecht. In each episode, Lobrecht is shown common utensils and he has to guess what kind of life hack you could do with them.

Since 10 February 2022, Lobrecht has hosted the show 1 Live 99 Problems on 1LIVE once a month. The show is about two hours long.

The New York Times published an article about Lobrecht on 12 February 2021, which was published on the front page of the print edition dated 17 February 2021.

Since 2025, Lobrecht has produced techno and hip-hop music under the stage name Azzle 447. and performs at festivals such as the 44 Festival, SonneMondSterne, and Hive with his record label, the 44 Label Group. In November 2025, Felix Lobrecht released the track Komm together with rapper Juju.

== Criticism ==
Following the broadcast of his show All You Can Eat, critical voices have been raised since its release in January 2025. The show has been described as "disturbing" or "misogynistic," among other things. He speaks in a sexist and derogatory manner about women and additionally claims, "Admit it, every one of you men out there has said something like 'A hole is a hole' before." The program was also criticized for a social "distinction downward." Parts of the program were also criticized as tasteless and anti-Semitic in light of a trivialization of the Holocaust. Additionally, the criticism questions the "public broadcasting mandate" of ARD.

== Awards ==
- Deutscher Comedypreis 2018 – Best newcomer
- 1LIVE Krone 2019 – Comedy award
- Deutscher Hörbuchpreis 2020 – Audio book of Sonne und Beton was the favorite of the WDR audience
- Deutscher Comedypreis 2020 – Best comedian
- Deutscher Comedypreis 2020 – Best comedy podcast (men) for Gemischtes Hack
- 1LIVE Krone 2020 – Comedy award for Gemischtes Hack
- Bayerischer Filmpreis 2022 – Screenplay of Sun and Concrete

== Publications ==
- 10 Minuten? Dit sind ja 20 Mark!, zusammen mit Malte Rosskopf, Satyr Verlag, Berlin 2015, ISBN 978-3-944035-55-0.
- Sonne und Beton, Ullstein Verlag, Berlin 2017, ISBN 978-3-8437-1477-8.
