= Buckow (Berlin) =

- Quarter of Berlin
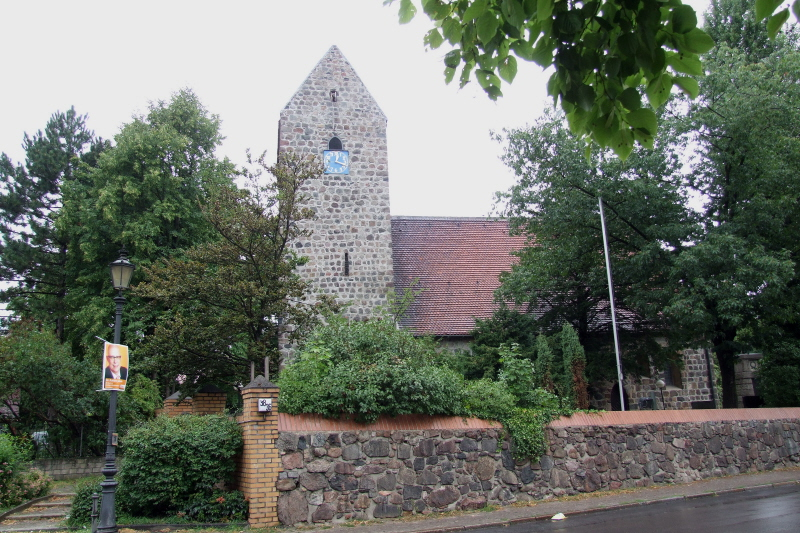
- Village church

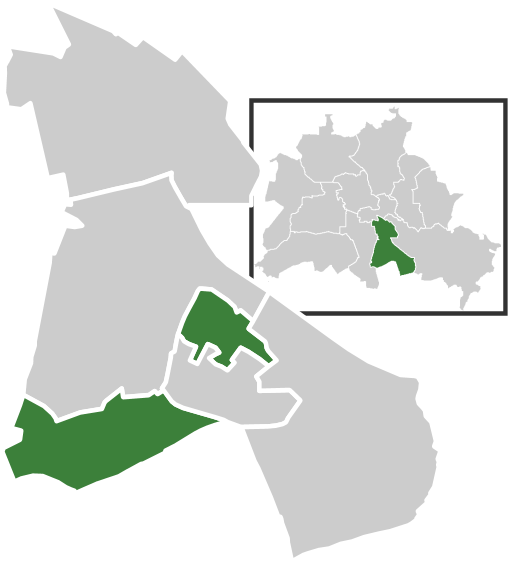
- Location of Buckow in Neukölln district and Berlin
- Interactive map of Buckow
- Location within Germany Location within Berlin
- Coordinates: 52°25′55″N 13°27′42″E
- Country: Germany
- State: Berlin
- City: Berlin
- Borough: Neukölln
- Founded: 1373
- Subdivisions: 2 zones

Area
  - Total: 6.35 km^{2} (2.45 sq mi)
- Elevation: 52 m (171 ft)

Population (2024-12-31)
  - Total: 41,099
  - Density: 6,470/km^{2} (16,800/sq mi)
- Time zone: UTC+01:00 (CET)
  - Summer (DST): UTC+02:00 (CEST)
- Postal codes: 12349, 12351, 12353
- Vehicle registration: B

Buckow (German pronunciation: [ˈbʊkoː] or [ˈbuːkoː]) is a locality (Ortsteil) within the Berlin borough (Bezirk) of Neukölln.

== History ==
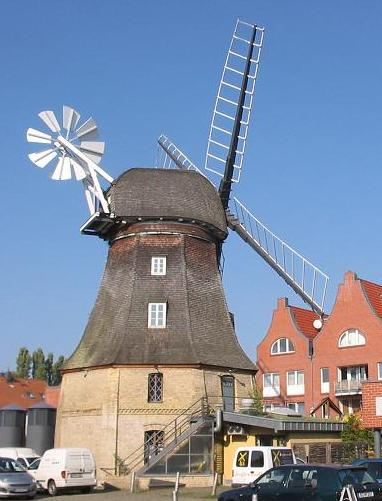
Jungfermühle

The village was founded in 1373 by German settlers probably at the place of an earlier Wends' village of the name Buk (a Beech tree) spelled along with its patronymic suffix -ow. Until 1920 Buckow was a municipality of the former Teltow district, merged into Berlin with the "Greater Berlin Act". From 1961 to 1989 its borders with Brandenburg were crossed by the Berlin Wall due to its position in the boundaries of West Berlin with East Germany.

In Goldammerstraße 34 is situated an historical smock mill, the Jungfernmühle, one of the oldest of Berlin. It was built in 1753 (or 1757) and it has only shutter wing and wind rose mockups without functions. Active until 1980 to ground grain into flour, it was the last mill used in the city and today its walls accommodate a restaurant.

== Geography ==
=== Overview ===
Situated in the southern suburb of Berlin, Buckow is the only Ortsteil counting an exclave (Buckow-II), separated from mainland by the Gropiusstadt. The other Berliner localities bordering with Buckow are Britz, Rudow, Lichtenrade and Mariendorf (both in Tempelhof-Schöneberg district). Buckow also has a boundary with the Brandenburger municipality of Schönefeld (Dahme-Spreewald district), and its residential area is contiguous with the civil parish of Großziethen.

=== Subdivisión ===
Buckow is divided into 2 zones (Ortslagen):

- Buckow-I (the mainland)
- Buckow-II (the exclave)

== Transport ==
The locality is not served by urban railways, but nearest stations (Johannisthaler Chaussee and Lipschitzallee, on the U-Bahn line U7), located in the Gropiusstadt, are not too far from the locality. It is served by the bus lines M11, M44, X11, 112, 171, 172, 179, 272 and 736. The X71 bus travels between the BER airport and U Alt Mariendorf.
