= Gropiusstadt =

- Quarter of Berlin
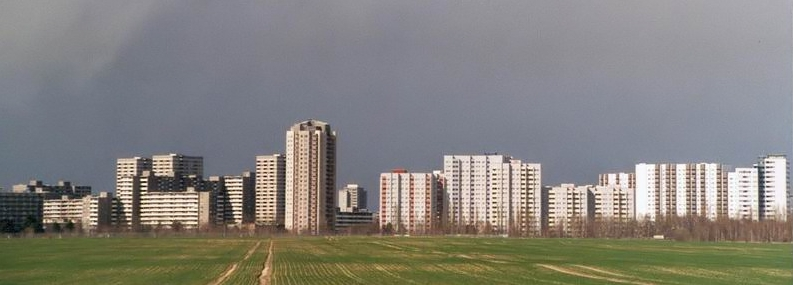
- Overview of the Gropiusstadt Complex

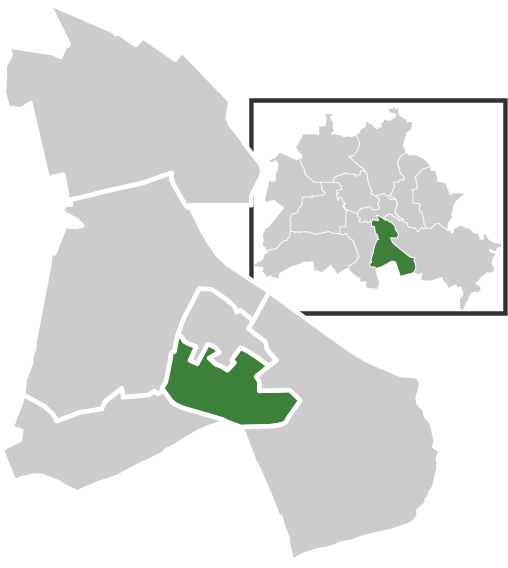
- Location of Gropiusstadt in Neukölln district and Berlin
- Interactive map of Gropiusstadt
- Location within Germany Location within Berlin
- Coordinates: 52°25′33″N 13°27′41″E
- Country: Germany
- State: Berlin
- City: Berlin
- Borough: Neukölln
- Founded: 1960

Area
  - Total: 2.66 km^{2} (1.03 sq mi)
- Elevation: 52 m (171 ft)

Population (2024-12-31)
  - Total: 39,011
  - Density: 14,700/km^{2} (38,000/sq mi)
- Time zone: UTC+01:00 (CET)
  - Summer (DST): UTC+02:00 (CEST)
- Postal codes: 12351, 12353
- Vehicle registration: B
- Website: Official website

Gropiusstadt (German: [ˈɡʁoːpi̯ʊsˌʃtat]) is a locality (Ortsteil) within the Berlin borough (Bezirk) of Neukölln. It was named after the architect who designed the complex, Walter Gropius.

== History ==
Construction of the quarter, initially named Britz-Buckow-Rudow and designed in a modernist style by Walter Gropius, ended in 1960. In Berlin, Gropius also projected the Sommerfeld House, the Interbau and the Großsiedlung Siemensstadt quarter. As part of West Berlin, its borders with Brandenburg (part of East Germany) were crossed by the Berlin Wall from 1961 to 1989. As of 2001 it was still an autonomous Ortsteil.

It became infamous as the place in which the German writer Christiane F. lived from childhood to adolescence, subject of the book Zoo Station: The Story of Christiane F.

== Geography ==
Located in the south-eastern suburbs of Berlin, a short section of Gropiusstadt borders on to Schönefeld, a municipality in the Dahme-Spreewald district, Brandenburg. It also borders on to the Berlin districts of Britz, Rudow and Buckow.

== Transport ==
Gropiusstadt is served by 4 U-Bahn stations, all located on the U7 line: Johannisthaler Chaussee, Lipschitzallee, Wutzkyallee and Zwickauer Damm.

== Photogallery ==
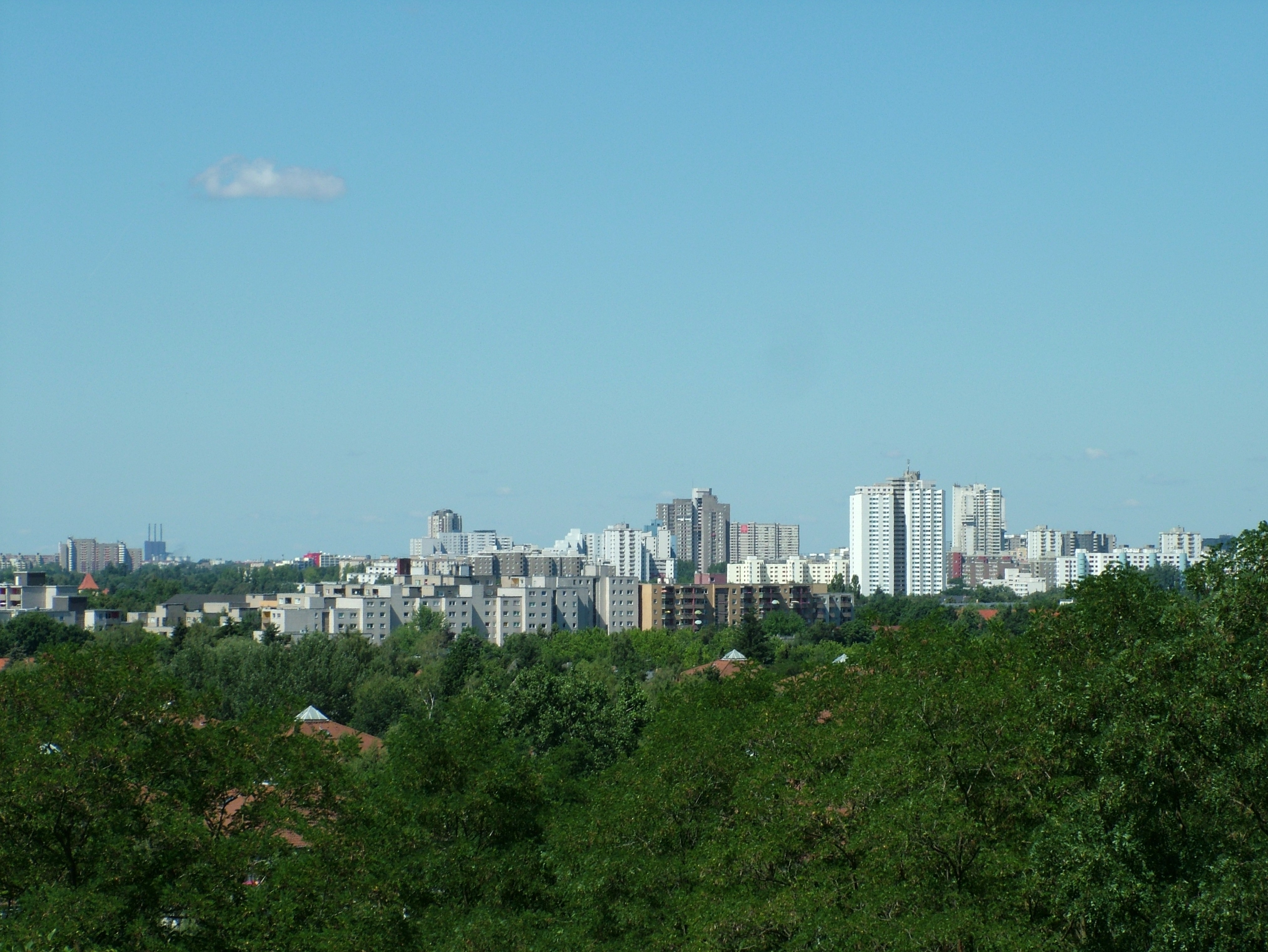
Panoramic view

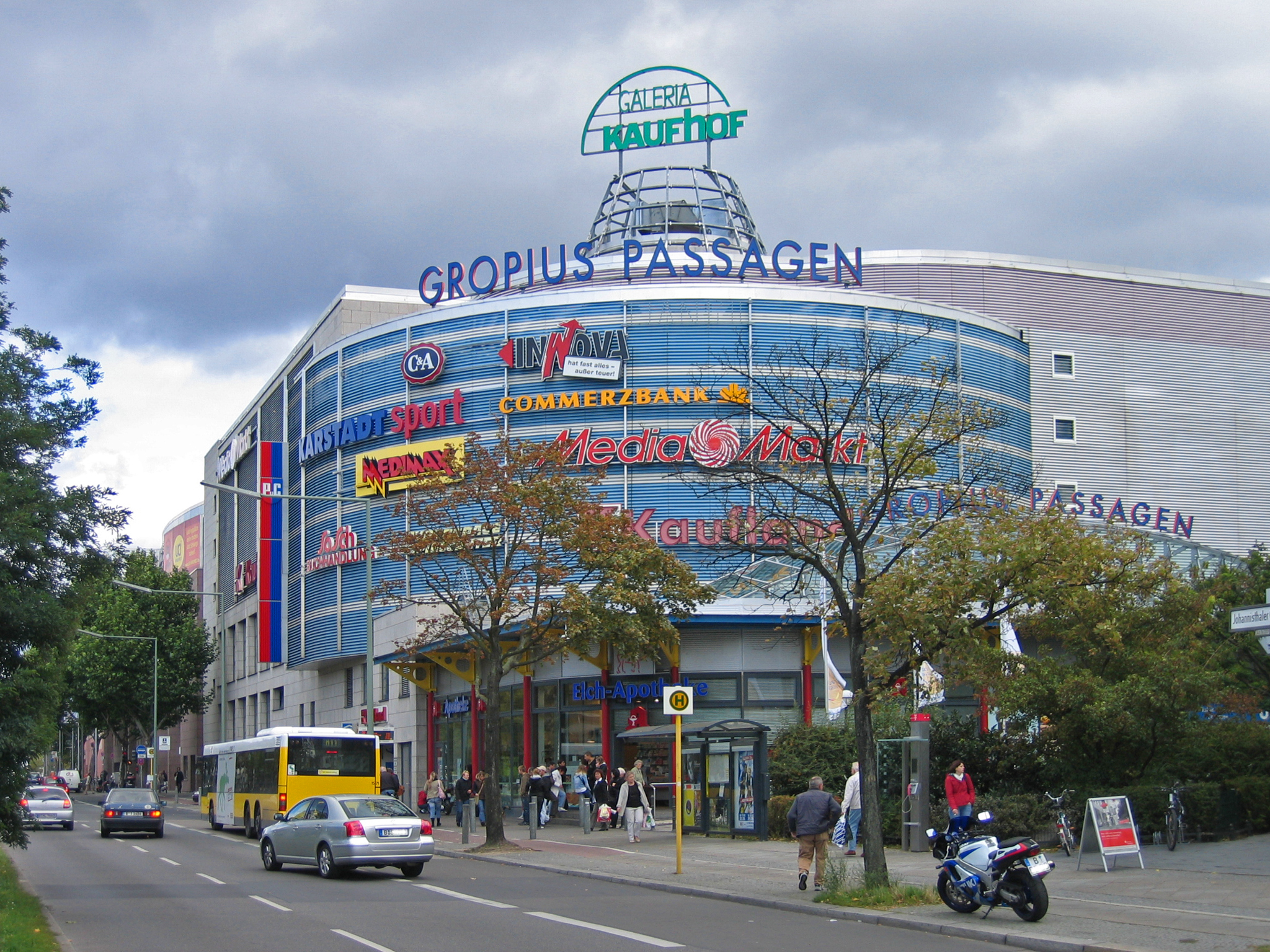
The shopping mall
"Gropius-Passagen"

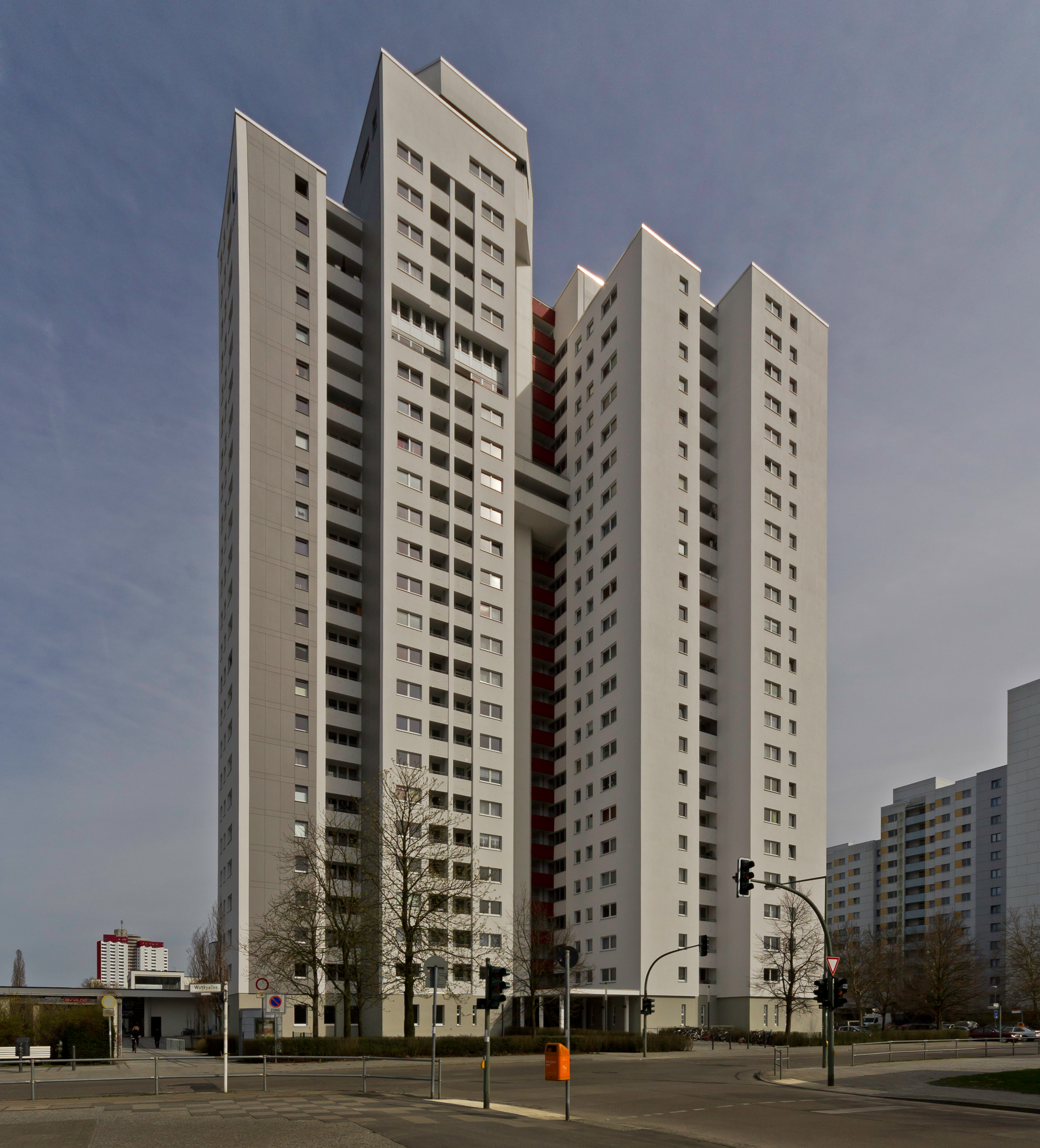
Apartment house
