= Marcel Hopp =

German politician

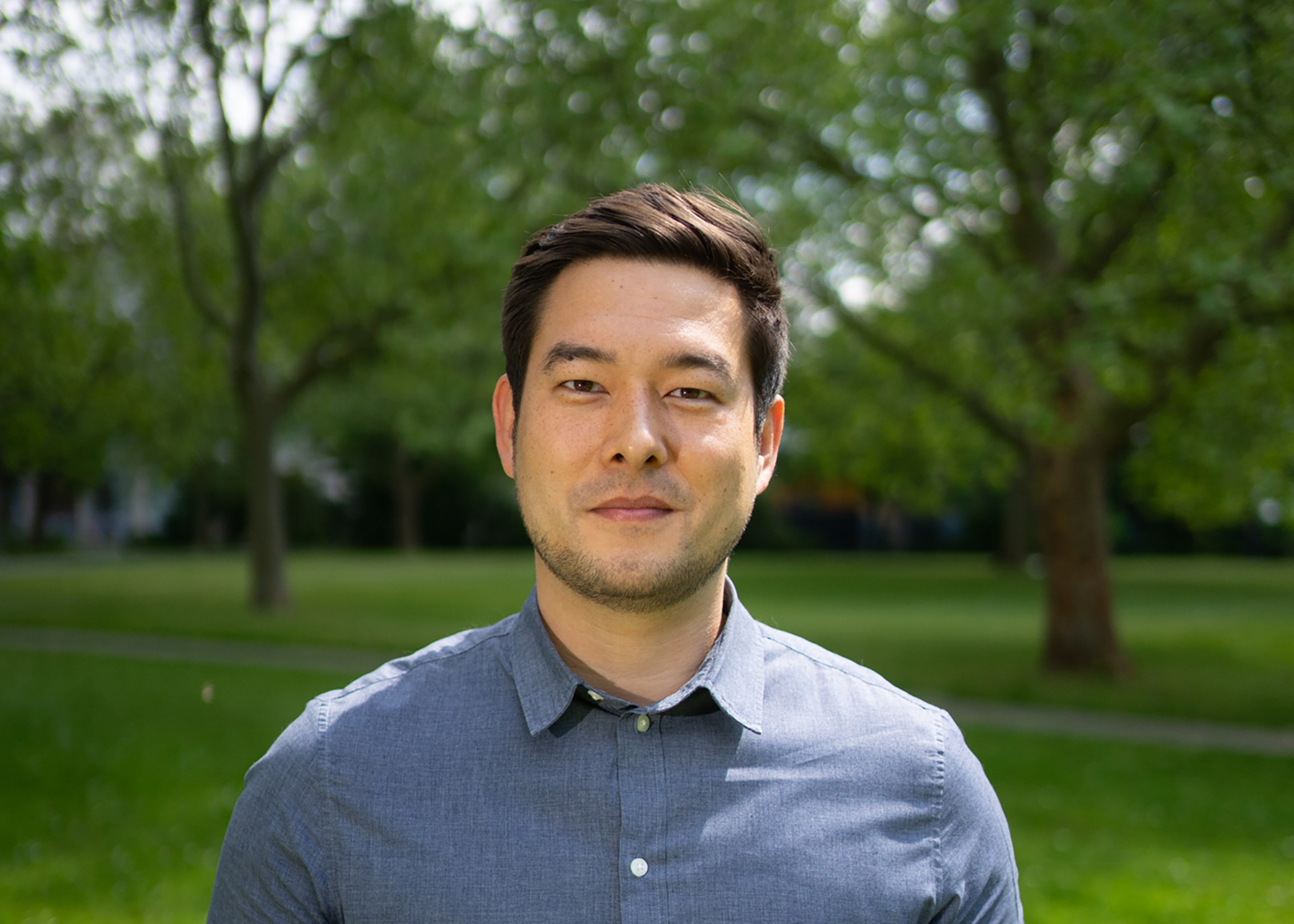

Member of the Abgeordnetenhaus of Berlin
- Preceded by: Derya Cağlar
- Succeeded by: Christopher Forster
- Constituency: Neukölln 4

Personal details
- Born: February 1988 (age 38) Neukölln, West Berlin, West Germany
- Party: Social Democratic Party of Germany
- Occupation: Politician

Marcel Hopp (born February 1988) is a German politician currently serving as Member of the Abgeordnetenhaus of Berlin.

== Personal life and education ==
Hopp was born in Neukölln in 1988 to a German father and South Korean mother who came to Germany to work as a nurse.

He attended local schools in Neukölln including the Leonardo-da-Vinci gymnasium before studying German, history and education at the Humboldt University of Berlin. He later worked as a teacher in the Rudow area.

== Career ==
Hopp was elected for the Neukölln 4 constituency at the 2021 Berlin state election, receiving 36% of the vote and achieving the second-highest constituency vote share for an SPD candidate in Berlin.

At the repeat election held in 2023 Hopp was defeated by Christopher Forster of the CDU and was not re-elected on the Neukölln list, either. However, Fabian Fischer declined his mandate on the Neukölln list to allow Hopp to return to the Abgeordnetenhaus. Fischer stated he was standing aside to allow his "good friend" to take his seat, describing Hopp as "one of the best representatives".
