= Sun and Concrete =

2023 German crime film

- Official poster
- Directed by: David Wnendt
- Screenplay by: David Wnendt; Felix Lobrecht
- Based on: Sonne und Beton by Felix Lobrecht
- Produced by: Fabian Gasmia; David Wnendt
- Starring: Levy Rico Arcos; Rafael Luis Klein-Heßling; Vincent Wiemer; Aaron Maldonado-Morales; Luvre47
- Cinematography: Jieun Yi
- Edited by: Andreas Wodraschke
- Music by: Enis Rotthoff; Konstantin "Djorkaeff"; Scherer; Phil The Beat
- Production company: Seven Elephants
- Release dates: 18 February 2023 (Berlinale); 2 March 2023 (Germany)
- Running time: 119 minutes
- Country: Germany
- Languages: German; Arabic; Italian; Mandarin

Sun and Concrete (German: Sonne und Beton) is a 2023 German coming-of-age and crime film co-written and directed by David Wnendt. This is the film adaptation of the autobiographically inspired bestseller of the same name by Felix Lobrecht, stars Levy Rico Arcos, Rafael Luis Klein-Heßling, Vincent Wiemer and Aaron Maldonado-Morales. It is about four classmates, who break into their school in Berlin-Gropiusstadt in the hope of solving their money problems. It is selected at the 73rd Berlin International Film Festival in Berlinale Special Gala, where it will have its world premiere on 18 February 2023. It is scheduled for release in cinemas on 2 March 2023.

== Cast ==
- Levy Rico Arcos as Lukas
- Rafael Luis Klein-Heßling as Gino
- Vincent Wiemer as Julius
- Aaron Maldonado-Morales as Sanchez
- Luvre47 as Marco
- Wael Alkhatib as Djamel
- Lucio101 as Tschörp
- Jörg Hartmann as Matthias
- Imran Chaaban as Momo
- Franziska Wulf as Gaby
- Bernd Grawert as Mr. Schiezeth
- Nicole Johannhanwer as Karin
- Gerdy Zint as Adi
- Felix Lobrecht as Shoot
- B-Tight as Kris
- Roland Wolf as Mr Reuter
- Jörg Rühl as Policeman Werner
- Marzia Tedeschi as Giovanna
- David Ruland as Steinfeld
- Jonathan Wirtz as Fabian
- Leon Ullrich as Mr. Sonnabend
- Ali Haydar Kocak as Chief
- Inaam Al Battat as Djamel's mother
- Arda Gorkem as student
- Jan Born as student

== Plot ==
Berlin-Gropiusstadt in the hot summer of 2003, in the time of tough social reforms. The teenagers Lukas, Julius and Gino spend their time in the Berlin district of Neukölln smoking pot and trying, largely unsuccessfully, to pick up girls. With the half-Cuban Sanchez, a new student joins the class, who quickly makes friends with Lukas and his buddies.

At home, the teenagers usually have nothing but troubles. Lukas perhaps has the greatest potential to make something of himself and is praised by his teacher for his well-written essays. He is full of admiration for his well-trained older brother Marco, who is a living street legend in the district and keeps his head above water as a petty criminal. Luke's father Matthias is unemployed and overwhelmed with parenting after the death of his wife. Gino suffers greatly from his father, a violent and choleric alcoholic who terrorizes his mother and son. Julius lives without parents in a run-down apartment together with his older brother, who is always drunk or stoned, bumming around with his buddies during the day. The loudmouthed Julius is always up for the party and drugs, and sometimes takes his brother's gun with him. Sanchez lives with his single mother, who can barely make ends meet financially even with a job, and despite everything wants to be a good mother to her son.

One morning, Lukas cannot enter his school because his student ID is lost and the security guards at the school gate are not allowed to let him pass without it. He meets up with his already school cutting friends. When the boys want to buy a small amount of weed in the nearby park, they get caught in the rivalty of two groups of dealers. A mass brawl breaks out until the police arrive. Not only gets Lukas beaten up, but one of the drug dealer gangs now demands 500 euros from him as compensation for the police intervention on his turf. On top of that, the boys are annoyed not to have enough money for activities like the public swimming pool, parties or going out with girls. To solve their money problems, Sanchez comes up with an idea. They break into their school at night and steal some of the brand new student computers, that were financed by the state of Berlin. Despite unprofessional execution, the boys succeed in breaking in; the next day, however, the school is full of police officers and journalists, and the theft at the "troubled school" attracts widespread media attention.

The boys manage to sell three of the computers for a disappointing sum. For the 800 euros they receive, they buy new brand-name clothes, among other things. When his teacher asks him for a personal interview, Lukas initially believes they have been busted - but Mr. Sonnabend suspects the fellow students with an immigrant background instead and believes that Lukas, as a German student, could help him solve the case. The drug dealers still haven't received the 500 euros and demolish Lukas' father's car as punishment. Lukas tries to clarify the situation with the leader of the drug dealers, who wants to beat him up. The drug dealer's Muslim mothers and aunts observe the situation and convince the dealer to make peace with Lukas. Later, when Lukas is standing in front of the door with the dealer without his family, he also has to give him his newly bought sneakers to make peace.

In the meantime, Lukas has admitted to his older brother Marco that he and his friends have stolen the computers. Marco arranges a meeting with a guy to whom the boys can sell the remaining computers. But the man doesn't pay them and simply drives away with the computers. What the guys don't know is that the guy is an accomplice of Marco's, who is now making money off the stolen computers for himself and using the money to pay off his own debts in the underworld. It is briefly seen that Marco uses his brother's lost student ID from the opening scene of the film to roll cigarettes.

While Luke, Julius and Sanchez get rid of the last computers, Gino, who is becoming increasingly desperate about the situation with his brutal father, goes crazy. Gino takes a drug given to him by Julius and gains courage from the intoxication, hits his father, who is once again beating up on his mother, with a bottle and seriously injures him. Then he jumps out of the window himself. When Lukas, Julius and Sanchez hear this and want to go to the hospital, Julius discovers his girlfriend Denise making out with the drug dealer Cem. A brief fight with Cem ensues, but the boys realize that going to the hospital is more important to them. The film ends with them visiting the badly injured but responsive Gino and hugging him as a sign of their friendship.

== Production ==
The film is adapted from the novel of the same name by Felix Lobrecht, he also wrote the screenplay together with director David Wnendt. The audition for roles was conducted from over 5,000 young people from all over Germany. Levy Rico Arcos, Vincent Wiemer, Rafael Luis Klein-Hessling and Aaron Maldonado-Morales made it to the final cast along with Jörg Hartmann, Franziska Wulf and musicians and hip-hop stars like Luvre47, Lucio101, Juju, Olexesh, NNOC, Azzi Memo, Klapse Mane and AOB.

Filming began on 25 June 2021 and was wrapped up on 11 September 2021 after 59 days of shooting in Berlin-Gropiusstadt.

== Release ==
Sun and Concrete will have its premiere on 18 February 2023 as part of the 73rd Berlin International Film Festival, in Berlinale Gala Special. It is scheduled to release in cinemas on 2 March 2023.

== Reception ==
Jan Lumholdt reviewing for Cineuropa praised David Wnendt's handling of images and performances of ensamble writing, ".... who all handle their parts with brio." In the end Lumholdt wrote, "Not least, there’s the area itself, relentlessly captured on location – concrete, sun and all – which is very much the main character."

== Accolades ==
Award	Date	Category	Recipient	Result	Ref.
German Film Award	12 May 2023	73rd German Film Awards Pre-selection	Sun and Concrete	Nominated	
