= Blub (water park) =

Water park in Germany

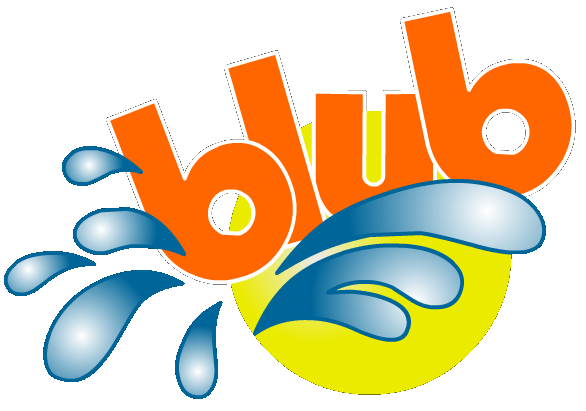
- Interactive map of Blub
- Location: Buschkrugallee 64, Neukölln, Berlin, Germany
- Coordinates: 52.4579°N 13.4445°E
- Opened: 1985
- Closed: 2002
- Owner: blub Badeparadies GmbH
- Status: Defunct

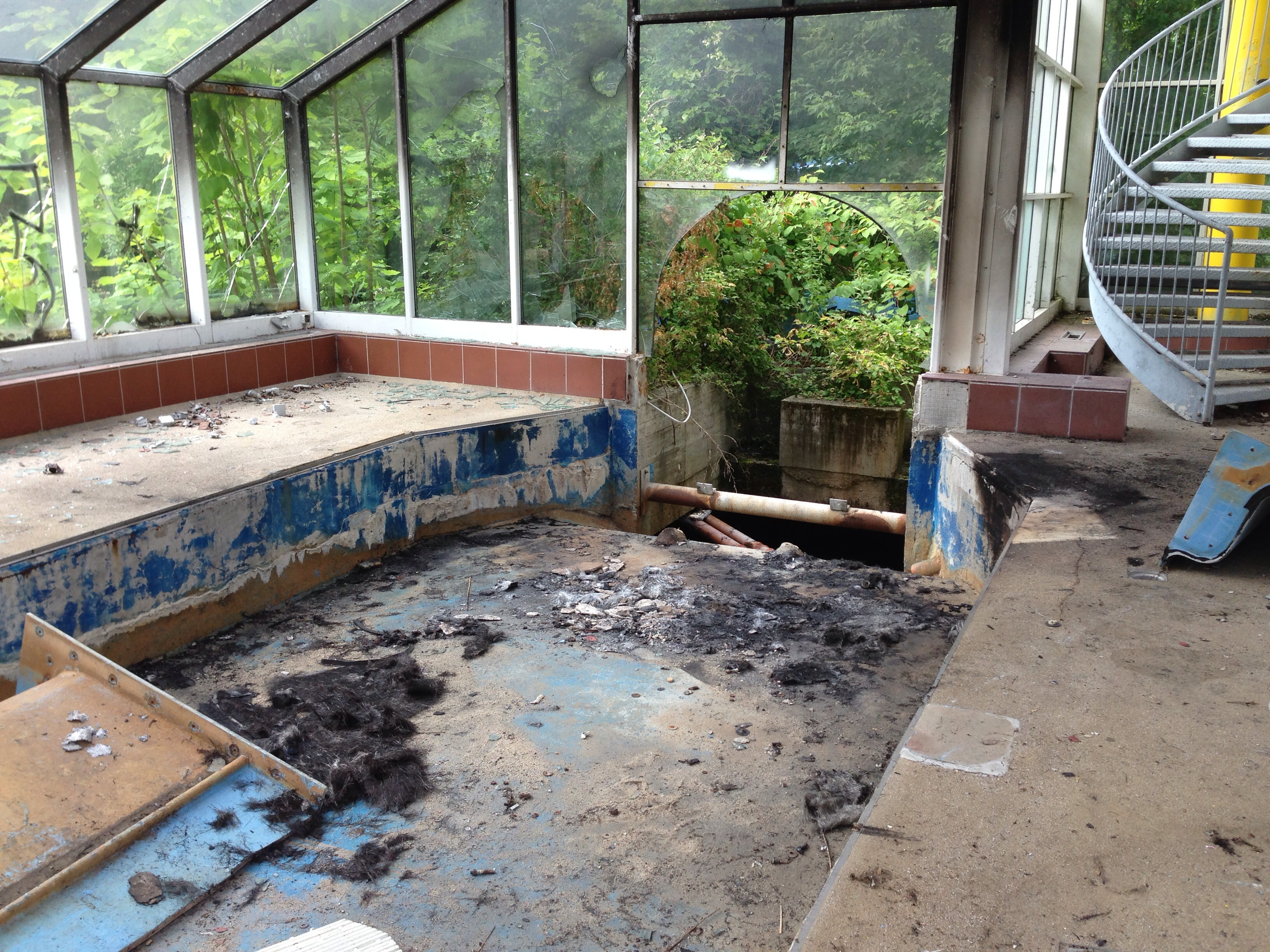
Interior of Blub in 2013

Blub, short for Berliner Luft- und Badeparadies ("Berlin air- and bathing paradise"), was a water park in the Britz area of Neukölln district in Berlin, Germany. First opened in 1985, it was shut down in 2002 following health concerns, and the 3.5-hectare (8.6-acre) site fell into disrepair. In 2016, the buildings on the site were severely destroyed by fire. Demolition work began in 2020; the site will be developed into a dwelling complex with 638 apartments.

The site is located at Buschkrugallee 64, 12359 Berlin, near the Teltow Canal.
