= Parchimer Allee station =

Station of the Berlin U-Bahn

Coordinates: 52.445°N 13.450°E

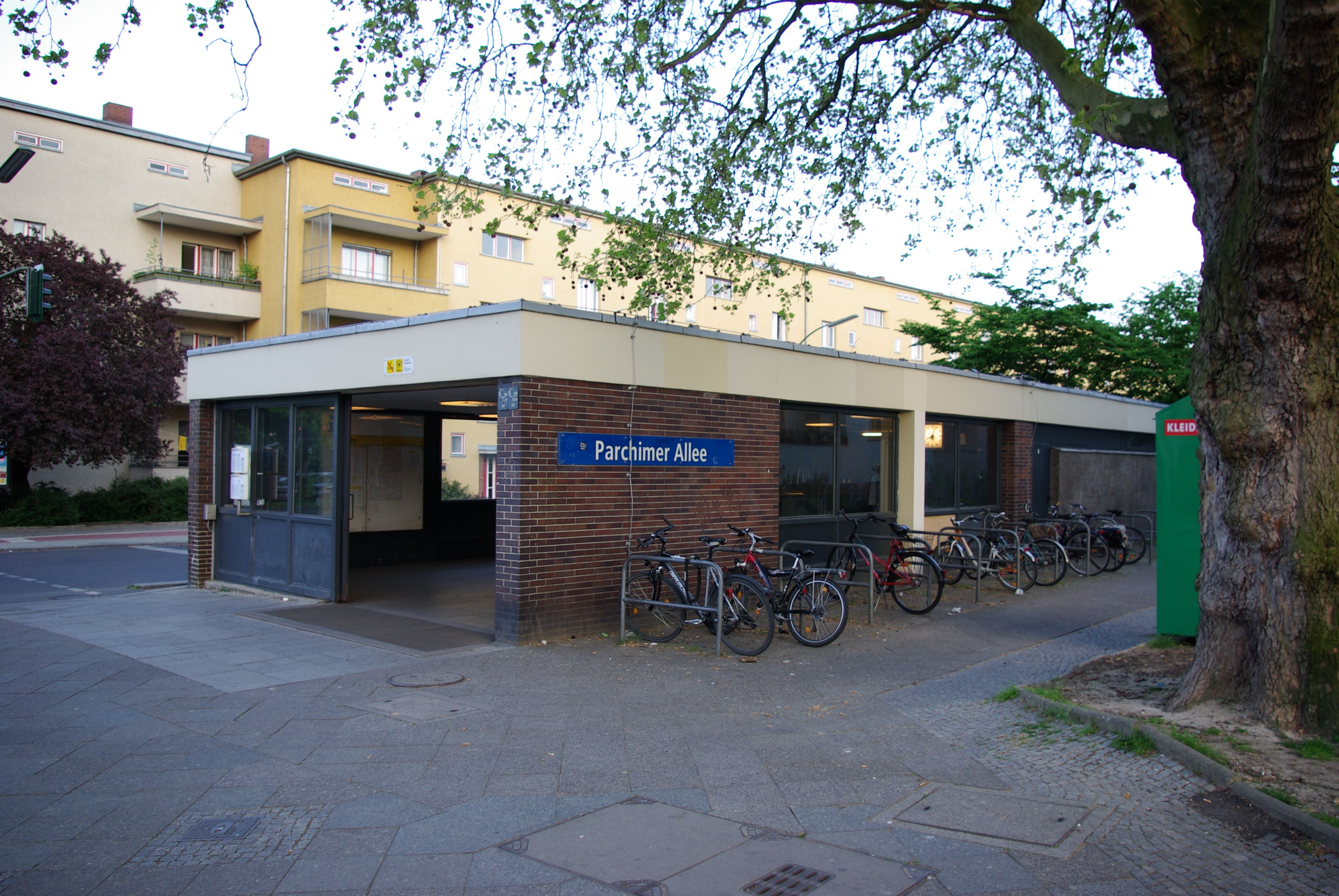
Parchimer Allee

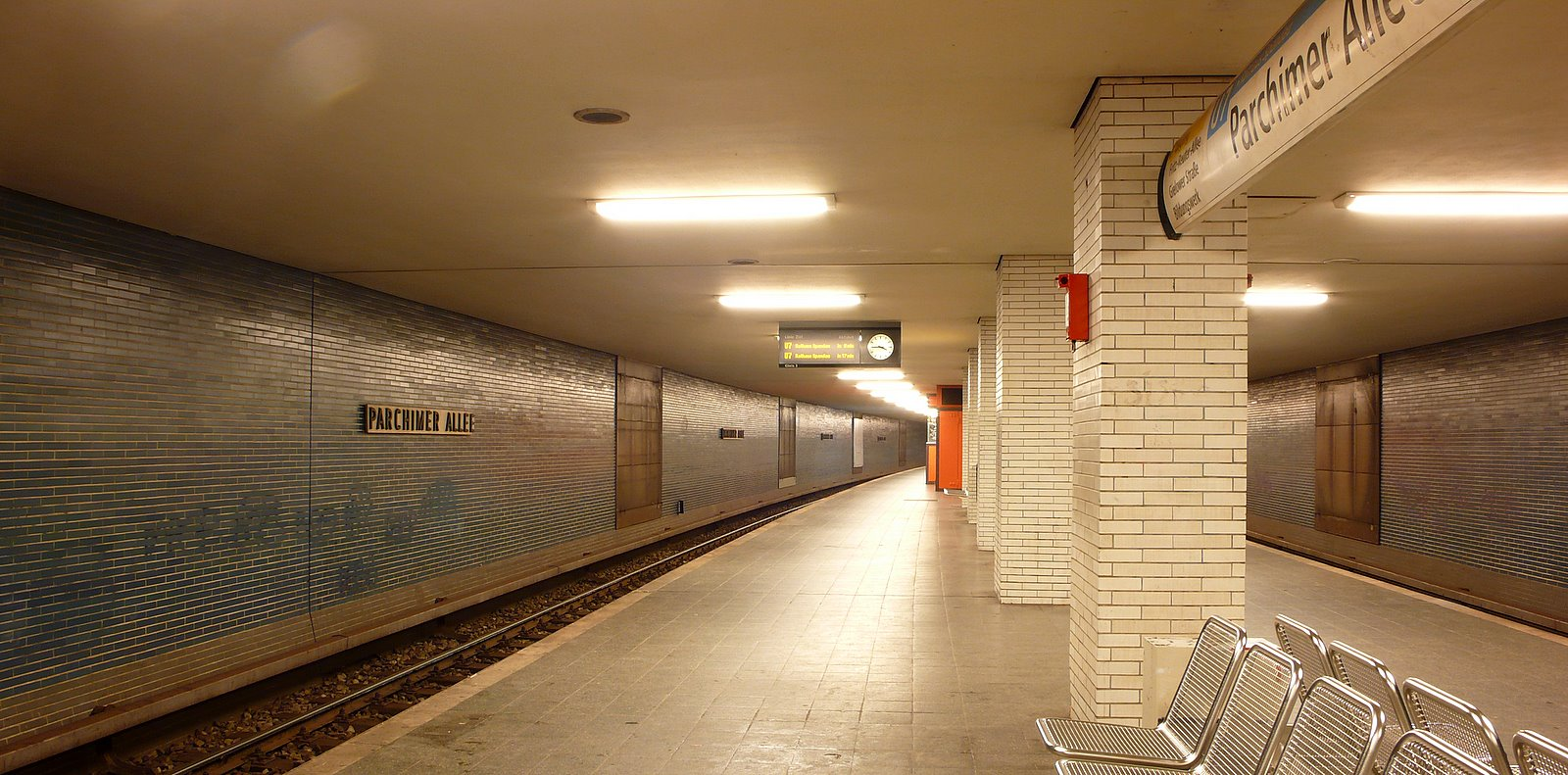
Platform view

Parchimer Allee is a Berlin U-Bahn station located on the U7.

Opened in 1963 and constructed by W. Düttmann. The next station is Britz-Sud.

Preceding station	Berlin U-Bahn	Following station
Blaschkoallee towards Rathaus Spandau	U7	Britz-Süd towards Rudow
