= Britz-Süd station =

Station of the Berlin U-Bahn

Coordinates: 52°26′16″N 13°26′54″E

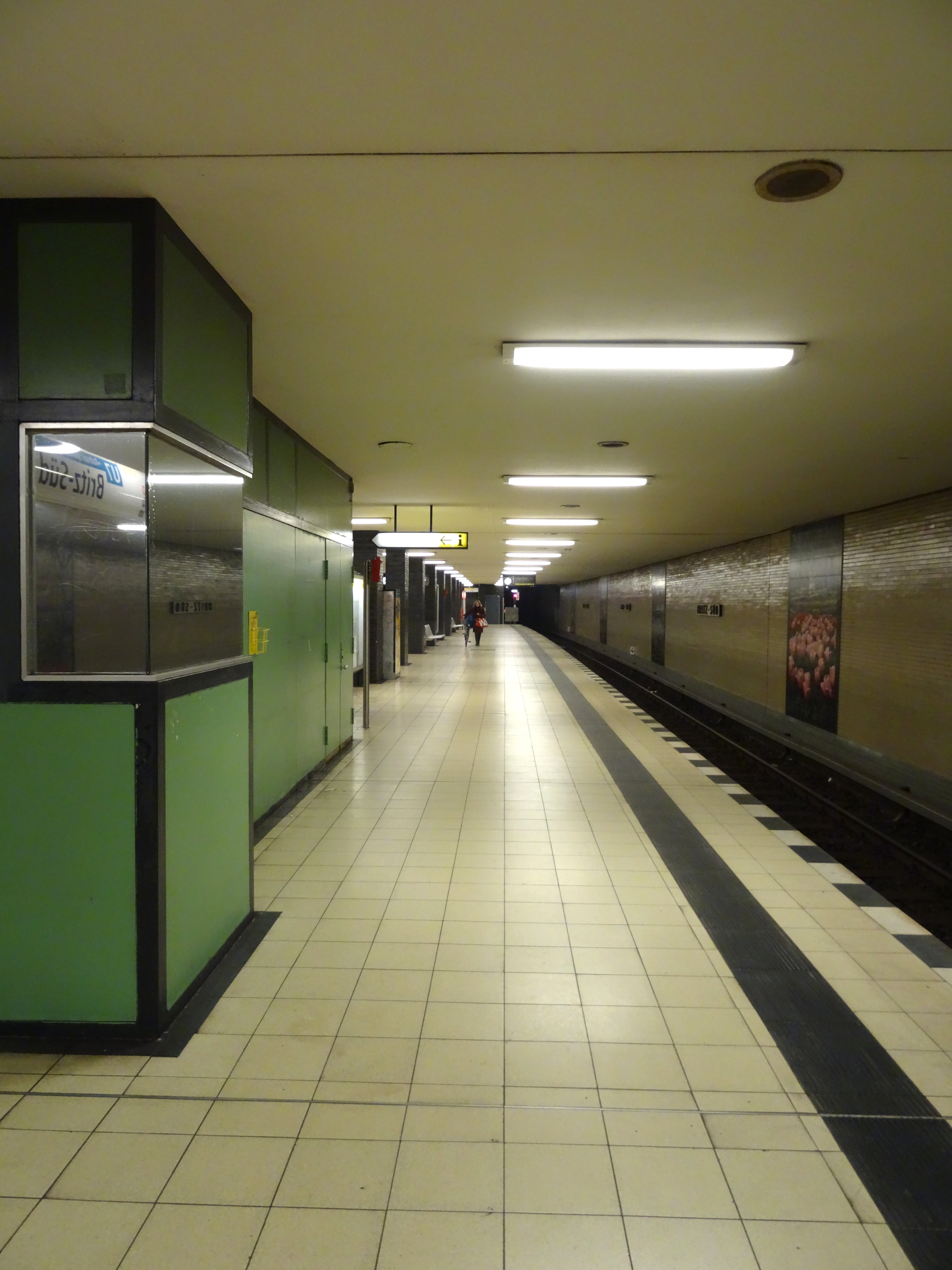
Platform of the station

Britz-Süd is a Berlin U-Bahn station located on the U7. It was opened in 1963 and constructed by W. Düttmann. Its characteristics are the grey tiles on the walls. Until 2003, this station only had a southern entrance. In 2003, the northern entrance was opened due to BVG safety policies. The station is only 3.5 metres below the street. The next station is Johannisthaler Chaussee.

== Notes ==
Preceding station	Berlin U-Bahn	Following station
Parchimer Allee towards Rathaus Spandau	U7	Johannisthaler Chaussee towards Rudow
