= Rudow =

- Quarter of Berlin
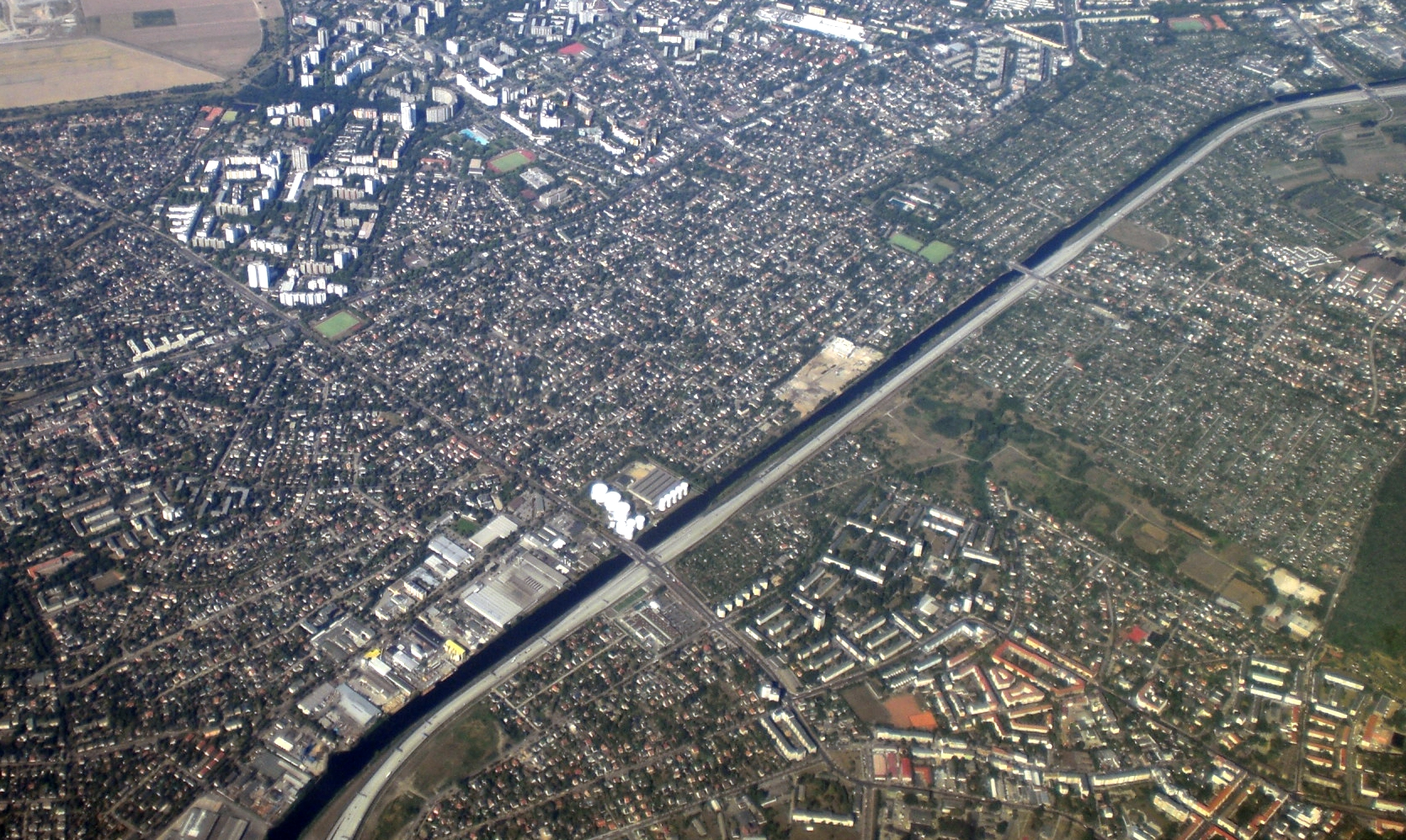
- Aerial view of Rudow with the Teltowkanal and a bit of Johannisthal (right)

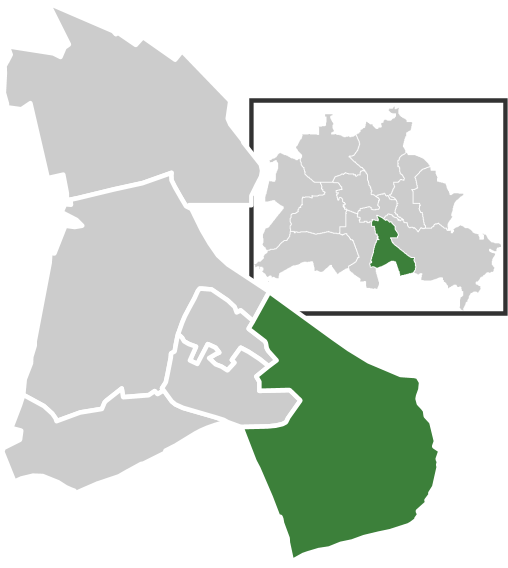
- Location of Rudow in Neukölln district and Berlin
- Interactive map of Rudow
- Location within Germany Location within Berlin
- Coordinates: 52°25′00″N 13°30′00″E
- Country: Germany
- State: Berlin
- City: Berlin
- Borough: Neukölln
- Founded: 1373

Area
  - Total: 11.8 km^{2} (4.6 sq mi)
- Elevation: 52 m (171 ft)

Population (2024-12-31)
  - Total: 42,818
  - Density: 3,630/km^{2} (9,400/sq mi)
- Time zone: UTC+01:00 (CET)
  - Summer (DST): UTC+02:00 (CEST)
- Postal codes: 12353, 12355, 12357
- Vehicle registration: B
- Website: Official website

Rudow (German: [ˈʁuːdoː]) is a locality (Ortsteil) within the Berlin borough (Bezirk) of Neukölln.

== History ==
The village was founded in 1373. Until 1920 it was a municipality of the former Teltow district, merged into Berlin with the "Greater Berlin Act". Due to its position at the borders of West Berlin with East Berlin and Brandenburg, 3/4 of its boundaries were crossed by the Berlin Wall from 1961 to 1989.

== Geography ==
Rudow is located in the southern suburb of Berlin, at the boundary with the Brandenburger municipality of Schönefeld, in the district of Dahme-Spreewald. It borders with the Berliner localities of Buckow, Gropiusstadt, Britz, Johannisthal and Altglienicke (both in Treptow-Köpenick district). The Teltowkanal represents the border with Johannisthal.

== Transport ==
Rudow is situated close to Berlin Brandenburg Airport and is served by the U-Bahn stations of Zwickauer Damm and Rudow, both on U7 line. In a plan to expand the U-Bahn it has been projected to prolong the U7 from Rudow terminus to the airport station, with 2 new stops in the quarter: Ostburger Weg and Rudow Süd.

At Rudower borders with Johannisthal, the short motorway A113 (built over the rests of the Berlin Wall), follows the Teltowkanal and serves the locality at the exits n.3 (Johannisthaler Chaussee) and n.4 (Stubenrauchstraße).

== Photogallery ==
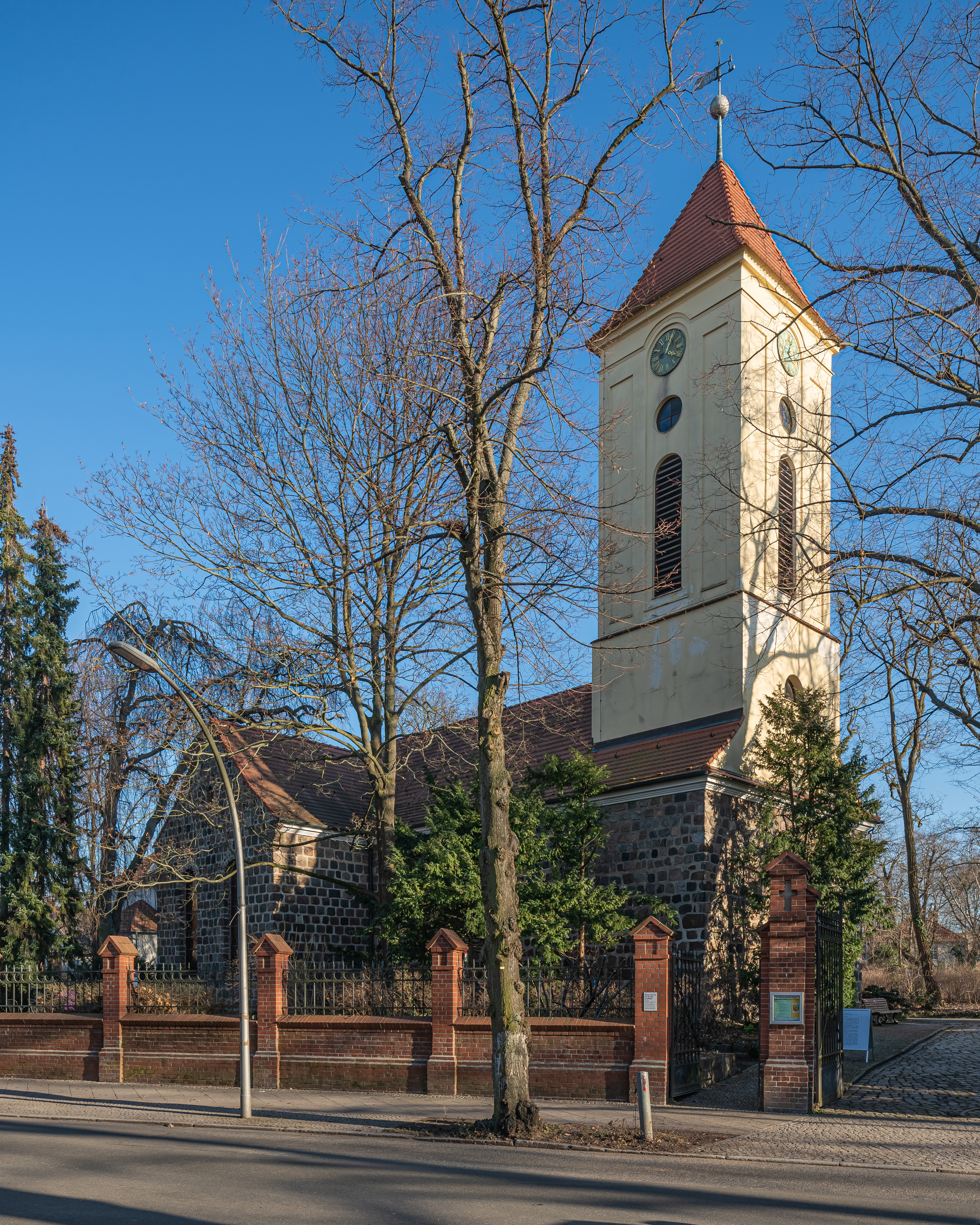
Village church

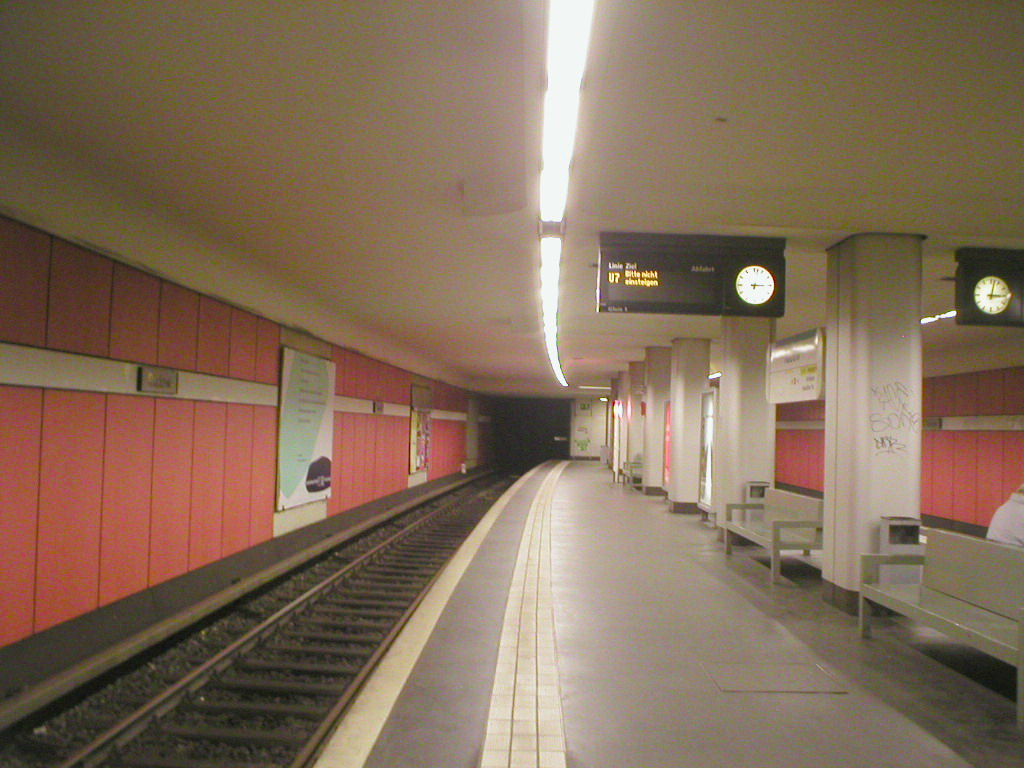
U-Bahn station "Rudow"

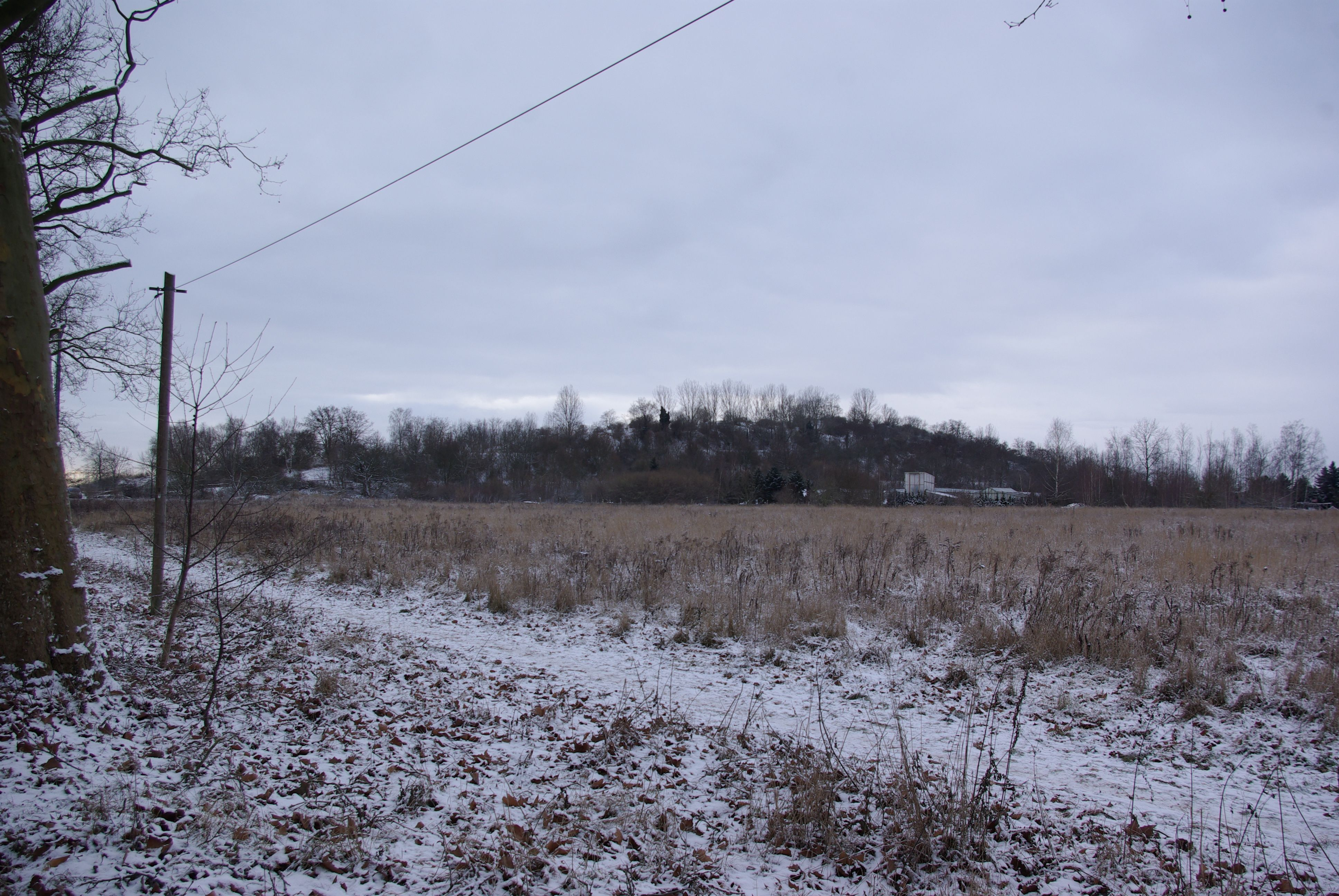
The hill of Dörferblick
