= Juju (disambiguation) =

A juju is a supernatural power ascribed to an object.

Juju may also refer to:

== Places ==
- Juju (district), one of seven districts on the island of Rotuma in Fiji
  - Juju, a village in the district
- Juju, Iran, a village in Isfahan Province

== Music ==
- Jùjú music, a style of Nigerian popular music

=== Performers ===
- Juju (Finnish rapper), 21st century rapper Julius Sarisalmi
- Juju (German rapper), Judith Wessendorf (born 1992)
- Juju (singer) (born 1976), Japanese singer Jun Sonoda (born 1976)
- JuJu, a member of the hip-hop group The Beatnuts
- Mojo Juju, a former stage name of Australian musician Mojo Ruiz de Luzuriaga (born 1983)

=== Albums ===
- JuJu (album), a 1964 album by Wayne Shorter
- Juju (Siouxsie and the Banshees album), 1981
- Juju (Gass album), 1970
- Juju (Chandrabindoo album), 2003
- Juju (Juju album), 2010

=== Songs ===
- "Juju", a song by Ice Prince from the album Everybody Loves Ice Prince
- "Ju-Ju", a 2018 song by a Russian rock band Leningrad

== People ==
=== Given name ===
- Juju Noda (born 2006), Japanese racing driver
- Ju Ju Wilson, Australian aboriginal artist

=== Nickname ===
- Juju Castaneda (born 1981), American media personality, author, actress and businesswoman
- Juju Chang (born 1965), Korean-American news anchor and reporter
- JuJu Harris (writer), American cookbook author, culinary educator, and food access activist
- Justine Henin (born 1982), Belgian tennis player
- JuJu Hughes (born 1998), American football player
- Julius Malema (born 1981), South African politician
- JuJu Smith-Schuster (born 1996), American football player
- JuJu Watkins (born 2005), American college basketball player

== Other uses ==
- Juju, an indie action-adventure video game
- Juju, nickname of a main character on Jeannie Aur Juju, an Indian sitcom
- Juju, a character from The Sword of Etheria, a video game
- Juju (software), a service orchestration tool
- JuJu, an Australian brand of menstrual cups

== See also ==
- JuJu Densetsu, the Japanese name of the video game Toki
- JuJu Mob, a Philadelphia hip hop group
- Juju Music, a 1982 album by King Sunny Adé
