= Johannisthaler Chaussee station =

Station of the Berlin U-Bahn

Coordinates: 52.429°N 13.453°E

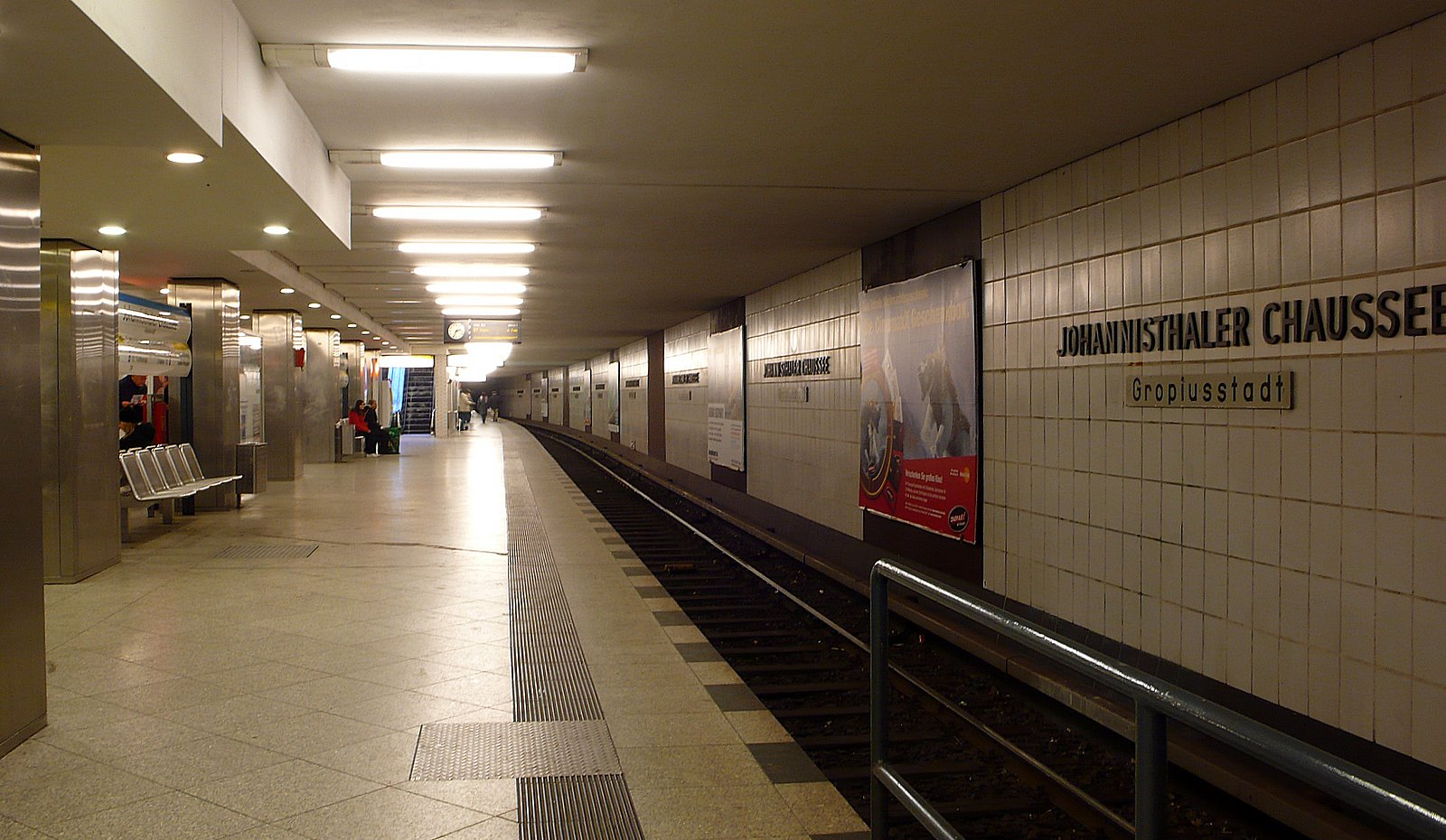
Platform of the station

Johannisthaler Chaussee is a Berlin U-Bahn station located on the U7. It was opened in 1970 by its architect Rainer G. Rümmler, and got the addition "Gropiusstadt" in 1972.

The station is located in the district of Gropiusstadt, from which the station also got its nickname. In the station list of the BVG this station carries the abbreviation 'Jt'.

When the shopping mall "Gropius Passagen" was opened, the station was refurbished and got a direct entrance to the shopping mall.

The station was designed by Rainer G. Rümmler. The station has a central platform with a central staircase leading to the Gropius Passagen shopping center and an exit on the northern platform that leads to a vestibule. The original entrance halls, as they existed in 1970, no longer exist. The walls are covered in gray tiles, interrupted by a horizontal white stripe on which the name of the station is written. The center columns are clad with metal sheets. The ceiling and platform itself are gray.

The station is fully wheelchair accessible via an elevator.

Preceding station	Berlin U-Bahn	Following station
Britz-Süd towards Rathaus Spandau	U7	Lipschitzallee towards Rudow
