= Wutzkyallee station =

Station of the Berlin U-Bahn

Coordinates: 52.423°N 13.475°E

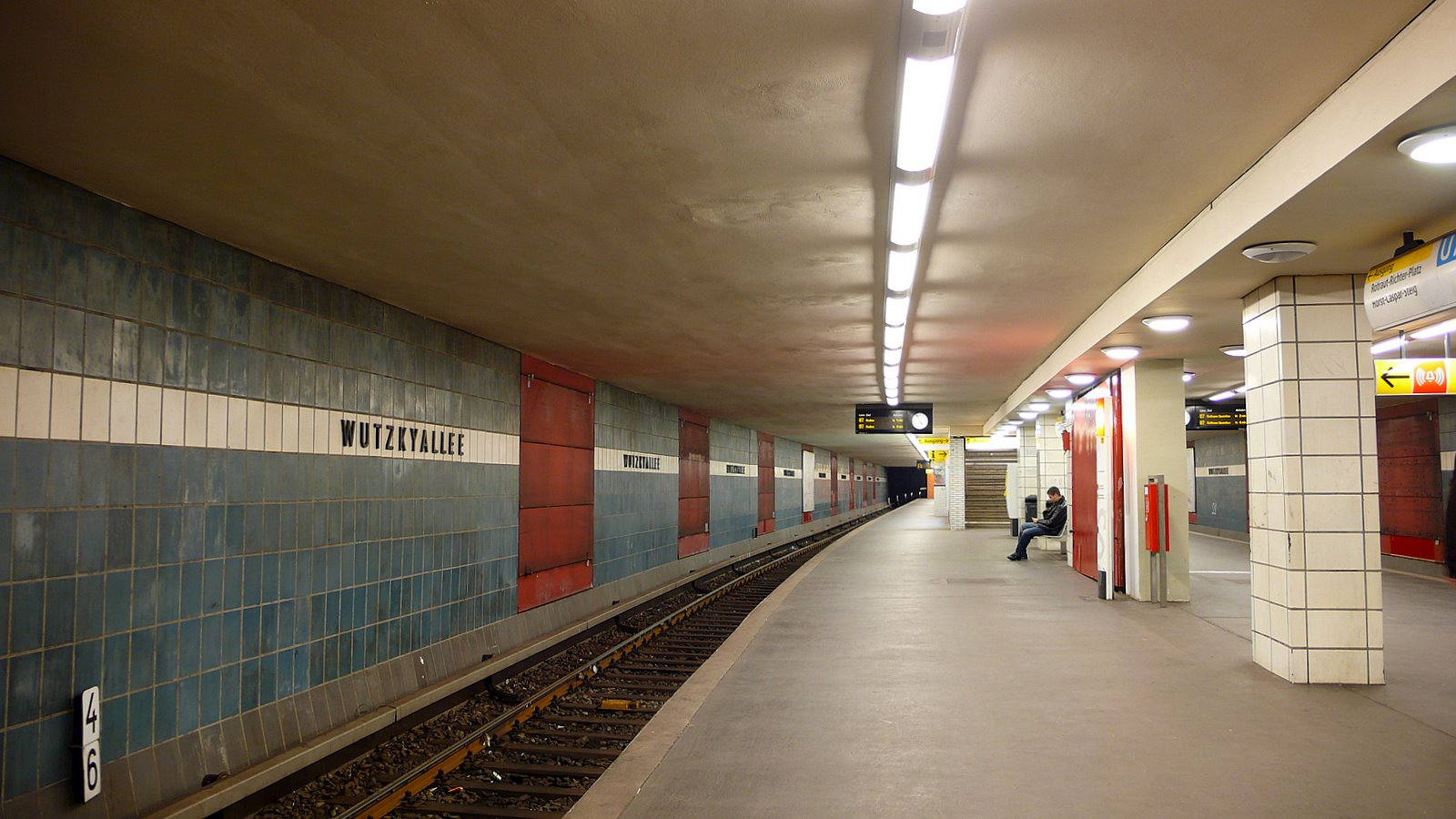
Platform view

Wutzkyallee is a Berlin U-Bahn station located on the U7. Designed by R.G.Rümmler and opened in 1970 it should be named "Efeuweg"; however, it was opened with the current name. The next station is Zwickauer Damm.

Preceding station	Berlin U-Bahn	Following station
Lipschitzallee towards Rathaus Spandau	U7	Zwickauer Damm towards Rudow
