= Zwickauer Damm station =

Station of the Berlin U-Bahn

Coordinates: 52°25′24″N 13°29′02″E

Zwickauer Damm
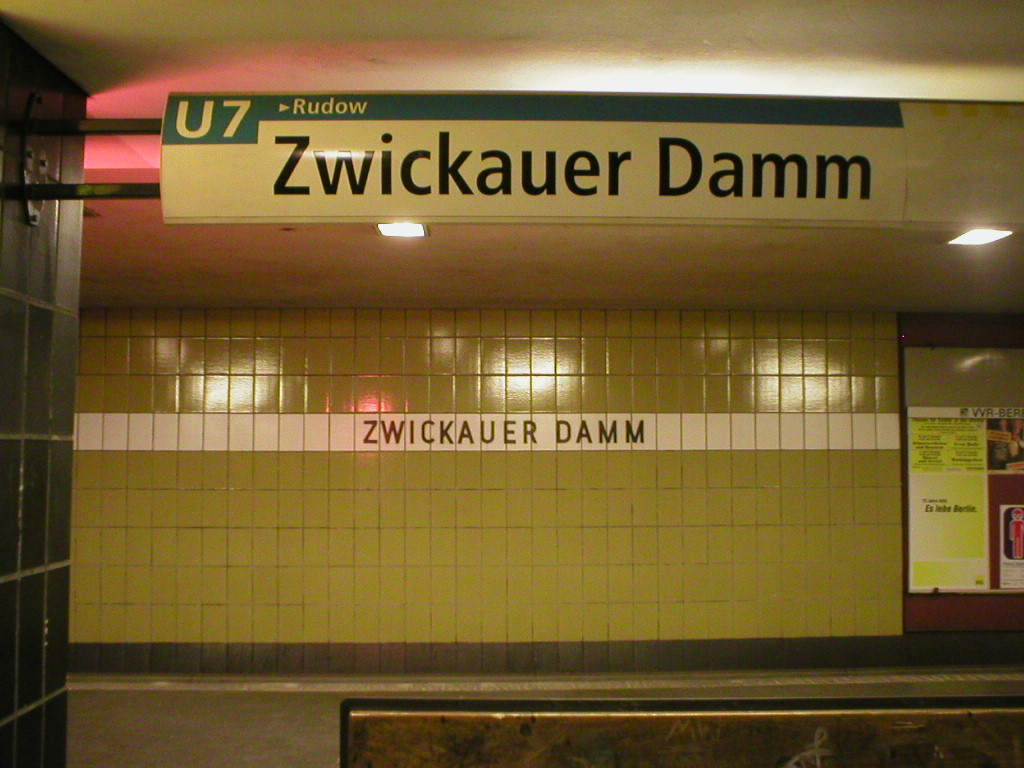
- U-Bahn station Zwickauer Damm

General information
- System: Berlin U-Bahn station
- Line: U7

History
- Opened: 1970

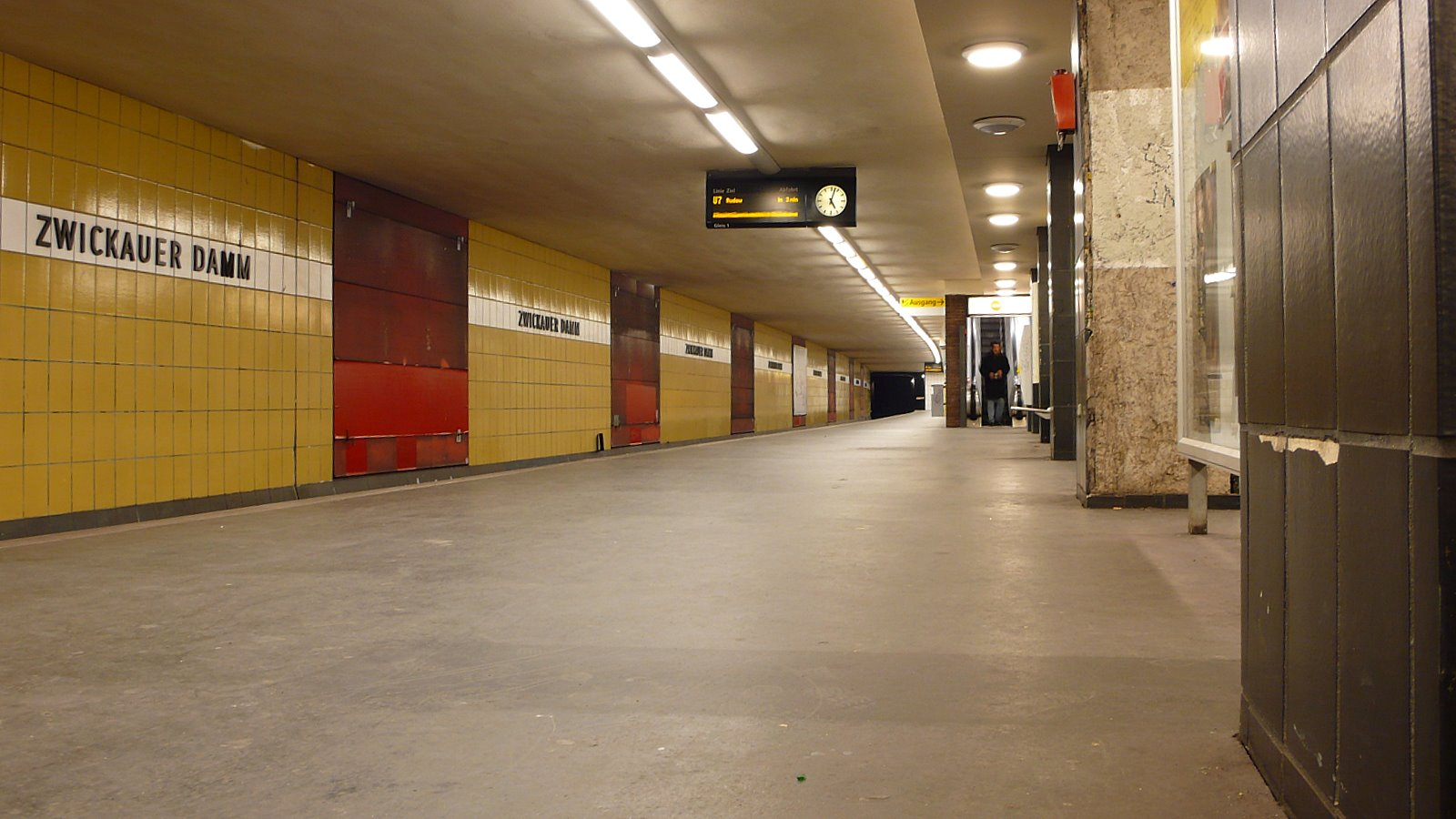
Platform of the station

Zwickauer Damm is a Berlin U-Bahn station located on the U7. Finished in 1970 by R. G. Rümmler it was the end of the line U7 until 1972 when Rudow station was opened. The next station is Rudow.

Preceding station	Berlin U-Bahn	Following station
Wutzkyallee towards Rathaus Spandau	U7	Rudow Terminus
