= Lipschitzallee station =

Station of the Berlin U-Bahn

Coordinates: 52.425°N 13.463°E

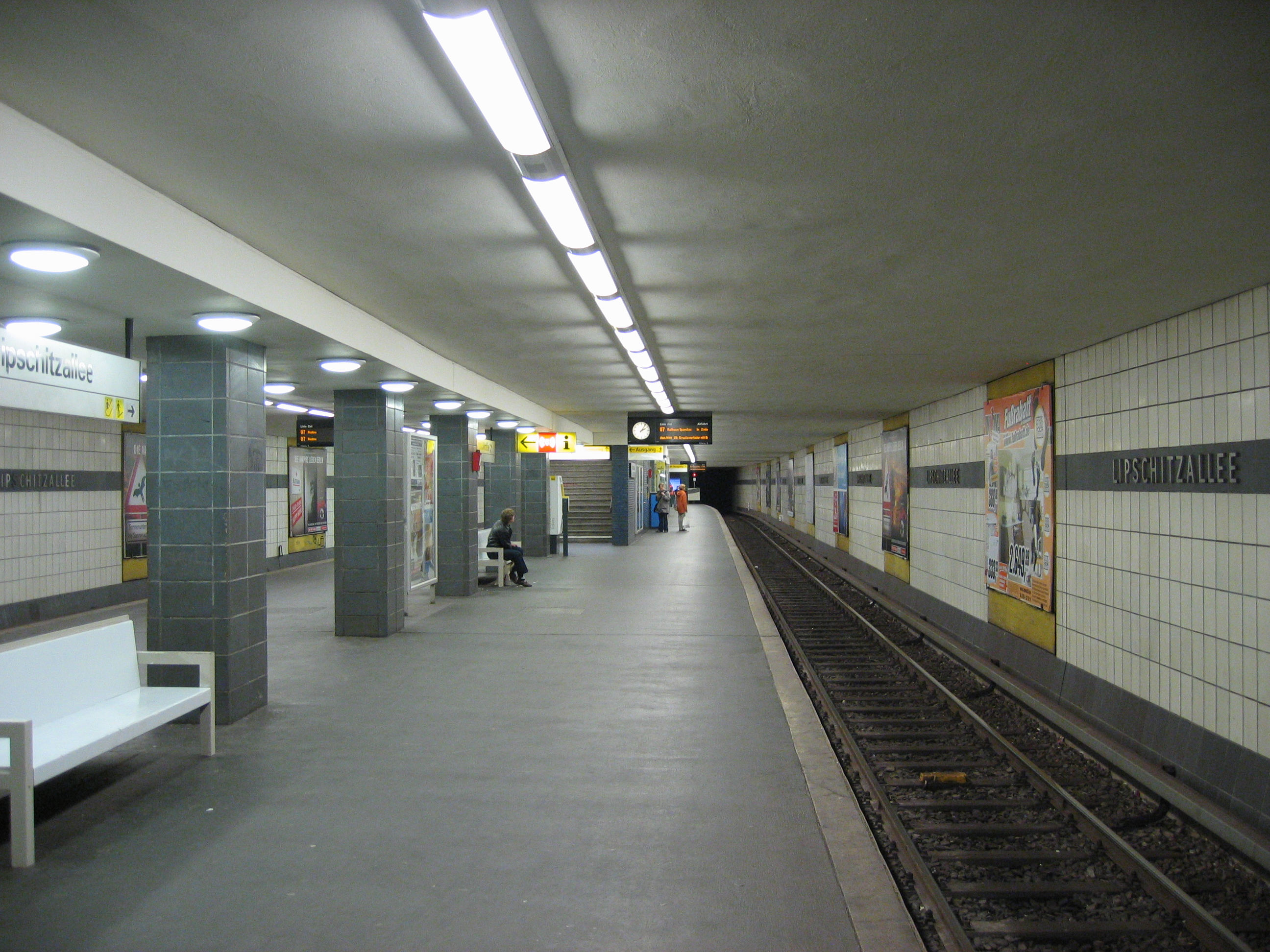
Platform, Lipschitzallee U-Bahn station

Lipschitzallee is a Berlin U-Bahn station located on the U7. This station was opened in 1970 (architect Rümmler) and was planned to be named Heroldweg. However it was named Lipschitzallee (after the SPD politician Lipschitz). The next station is Wutzykallee.

Preceding station	Berlin U-Bahn	Following station
Johannisthaler Chaussee towards Rathaus Spandau	U7	Wutzkyallee towards Rudow
