= Britz =

- Quarter of Berlin
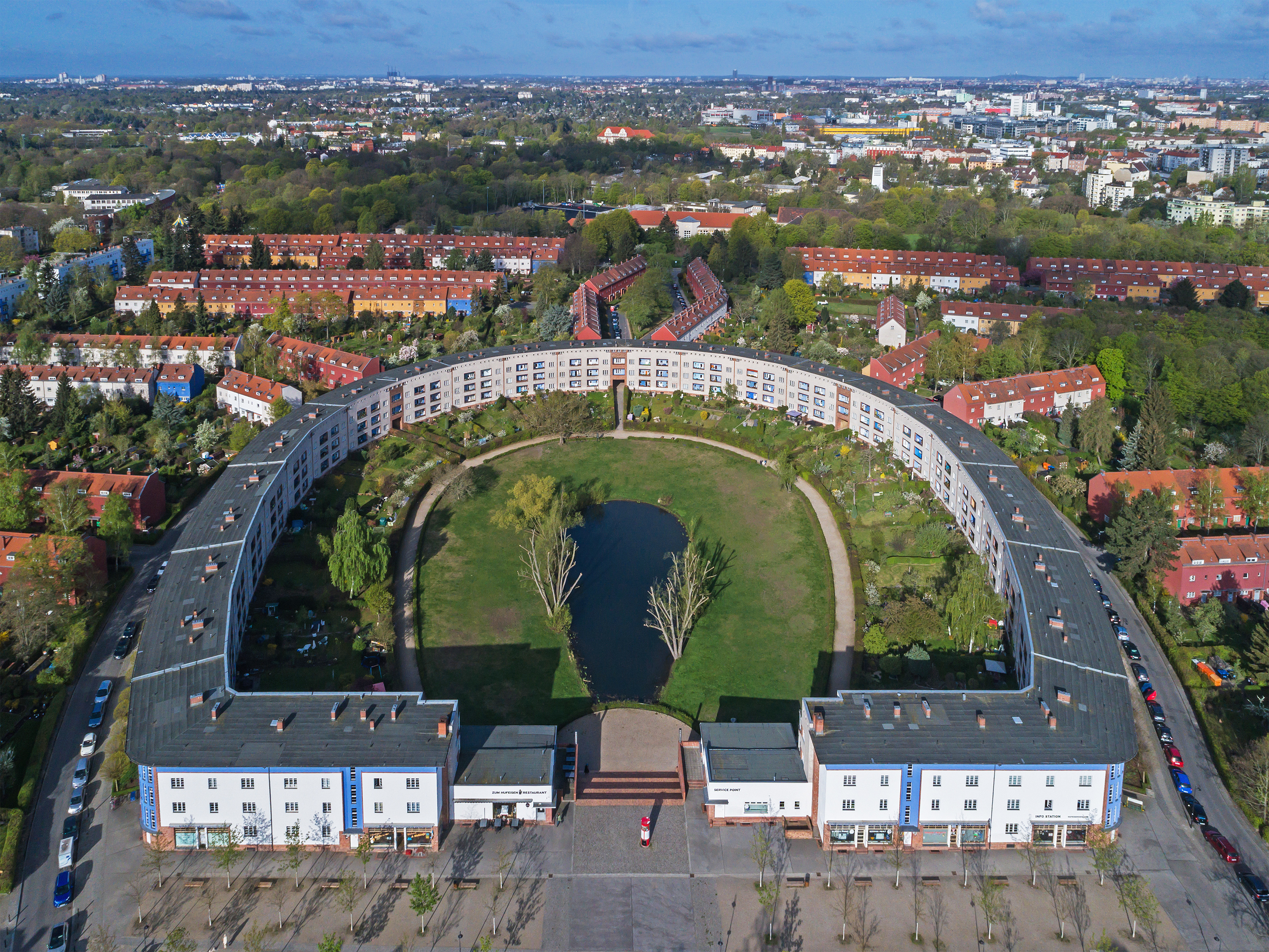
- Hufeisensiedlung

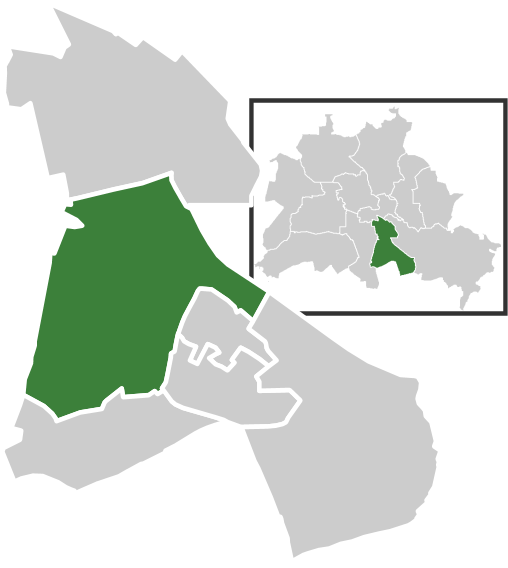
- Location of Britz in Neukölln district and Berlin
- Interactive map of Britz
- Location within Germany Location within Berlin
- Coordinates: 52°27′00″N 13°26′00″E
- Country: Germany
- State: Berlin
- City: Berlin
- Borough: Neukölln
- Founded: 1273

Area
  - Total: 12.4 km^{2} (4.8 sq mi)
- Elevation: 52 m (171 ft)

Population (2024-12-31)
  - Total: 44,012
  - Density: 3,550/km^{2} (9,190/sq mi)
- Time zone: UTC+01:00 (CET)
  - Summer (DST): UTC+02:00 (CEST)
- Postal codes: 12347, 12359
- Vehicle registration: B
- Website: Official website

Britz (German: [bʁɪts]) is a German locality (Ortsteil) within the Berlin borough (Bezirk) of Neukölln.

== History ==
The village of Britzig was first mentioned in 1273. It was incorporated by the 1920 Greater Berlin Act. It is known for being the site of the Hufeisensiedlung ("Horseshoe Estate"), part of the UNESCO Berlin Modernism Housing Estates World Heritage Site since 2008.

== Public transport ==
Britz is served by the U7 (Berlin U-Bahn) traveling North / South from and to the terminus at Rudow (Berlin U-Bahn).

== Sights ==
- Village church with foundation walls from the 13th century
- Schloss Britz (Britz Manor), rebuilt in 1883, former residence of Prussian statesman Ewald Friedrich von Hertzberg
- Britz windmill built in 1866
- Britzer Garten, site of the 1985 Bundesgartenschau

=== Hufeisensiedlung ===
The subsidized housing estate was built on the fields of Britz manor between 1925 and 1933 according to plans by Bruno Taut and Martin Wagner. The project was initiated by a housing cooperative established to combat the shortage of affordable living space. Numerous blocks and terraced houses in New Objectivity style with colorful facades include more than 1,000 apartments, situated in spacious gardens designed by landscape architect Leberecht Migge.

=== Transmission facility ===
The transmission facility of the newly founded RIAS – present-day Deutschlandradio – was built on a site in Britz in 1946 by the American military administration. Several temporary structures were replaced in 1948 with the current, 100-metre high steel masts. These were later extended to heights of 160 m and 144 m.

Short-wave transmissions were made from Britz starting in 1949. In 1978, a medium-wave transmission aerial was added to allow better reception across the whole of the GDR's territory, especially at night.

=== Blub ===
The disused Blub ("Berliner Luft- und Badeparadies") water park is situated in Britz, near the Teltow Canal. It has become a site of interest to those interested in ruined architecture. It is due for redevelopment in the near future.
