= Neukölln =

Borough of Berlin, Germany

- Borough of Berlin
- Flag Coat of arms

- Location of Neukölln in Berlin
- Interactive map of Neukölln
- Location within Germany Location within Berlin
- Coordinates: 52°29′N 13°27′E
- Country: Germany
- State: Berlin
- City: Berlin
- Subdivisions: 5 quarters

Government
  - Mayor: Martin Hikel (SPD)

Area
  - Total: 44.93 km^{2} (17.35 sq mi)

Population (2024-12-31)
  - Total: 307,113
  - Density: 6,835/km^{2} (17,700/sq mi)
- Time zone: UTC+01:00 (CET)
  - Summer (DST): UTC+02:00 (CEST)
- Vehicle registration: B
- Website: Official homepage

Neukölln (German: [nɔʏˈkœln]; officially abbreviated Neuk), is one of the twelve boroughs of Berlin. It is located south-east of Berlin's center and stretches from the inner city southward to the border with Brandenburg, encompassing the eponymous quarter of Neukölln in the north, and the southern quarters of Britz, Gropiusstadt, Buckow and Rudow.

The borough was constituted in 1920, when the Greater Berlin Act came into effect. After World War II, Neukölln was part of the American sector during the Allied occupation of the city, and of West Berlin from 1949 until German reunification in 1990. Since the late 1950s, it has been characterised by one of the highest shares of immigrant residents in Berlin, especially in its urbanized and industrialized northern regions. An influx of students and artists since the mid-2000s has led to gentrification.

== History ==
Since the borough Neukölln is only an administrative district, its history is shaped and overshadowed by the long and varied histories of its constituent quarters Neukölln, Britz, Gropiusstadt, Buckow and Rudow, which reflect the region's and city's changing political and cultural landscape. With the exception of Gropiusstadt, the villages that eventually became the quarters of Neukölln were all founded between the beginning of the 13th century and the latter half of the 14th century, long before Berlin's boroughs were created.

In the early 20th century, the newly forming modern societies and infrastructures of Berlin and its periphery had begun to create problems and threatened to thwart further development, because the disparity between the different communities, which naturally aimed to expand beyond the old municipal boundaries, now created cross-border administrative conflicts and gridlock. Therefore, the Greater Berlin Act was passed by the Prussian parliament in the spring of 1920. Neukölln was constituted on 1 October 1920 as the 14th borough of Greater Berlin by merging the city of Neukölln and the southern municipalities of Britz, Buckow and Rudow. It received its name from Neukölln (formerly Rixdorf), a free and independent city before the merger, and now the borough's northernmost quarter. The new borough extended from the lower east side of Berlin's inner city all the way to the southern border with Brandenburg. The first election of Neukölln's new assembly of borough representatives (Bezirksverordnetenversammlung, BVV) was held on 20 June 1920, but had to be repeated on 16 October 1921. Neukölln's first borough mayor was Alfred Scholz (SPD), who had transitioned from his office as city mayor of Neukölln.

During the Weimar Republic, urbanization slowly expanded from the northern and mainly industrialized quarters to the borough's more rural areas south of the Teltow Canal. The first state election, in which Berlin's new constituents of Neukölln were allowed to vote, was held on 25 October 1925. Neukölln reached its largest pre-war population with 313,790 residents in 1932. After World War II, Neukölln underwent rebuilding and significant transformations as a result of the city's division by the Berlin Wall. After the withdrawal of the occupying Soviet forces, the borough was part of the American sector from 1945 to 1949, and then of West Berlin. The borough became one of the important centers of the city's industry, trade and commerce, especially in the northern quarters of Neukölln and Britz, while the southern parts of the borough mostly became a place for residential areas, characterized by a larger number of family homes and middle-class households.

On 13 May 1954, Berlin passed legislation which allowed its boroughs to carry official heraldic emblems. For Neukölln, Rixdorf's historical coat of arms was slightly altered and approved by Neukölln's district office and representative assembly by 12 March 1956. It was admitted by the city of Berlin in April 1956 and awarded to the whole borough of Neukölln on 16 May 1956.

Following the pre-war new objective constructions (Neues Bauen) like Britz' Hufeisensiedlung, post-war Neukölln experienced a boom of social district redevelopment and new modernist construction in many places. From 1966 to 1975, the Gropiusstadt, a suburban satellite housing estate (Trabantenstadt) designed by architect Walter Gropius, was constructed in Britz, Rudow and mainly Buckow. In the northern quarter of Neukölln, smaller-scale redevelopments were initiated in the Rollberg neighborhood, while modern construction projects created the new neighborhoods Weiße Siedlung and High-Deck-Siedlung. Many of these new residential areas became a home for Neukölln's new immigrant population.

In 1985, Neukölln constructed the Britzer Garten for the biennial Bundesgartenschau, which was hosted by Berlin. After the fall of the Berlin Wall, Neukölln's southern quarters, especially Rudow, experienced a significant increase in transit traffic due to the borough's proximity to suburban residential construction projects in Brandenburg, the Berlin Schönefeld Airport, now Berlin Brandenburg Airport, and the autobahn A 113. As part of Berlin's administrative reform, Neukölln was reorganized as the 8th borough of Berlin on 1 January 2001. Gropiusstadt, originally just a large suburban housing estate in the borough's south, was declared an official quarter and joined the borough a year later, which split the Buckow quarter in half. In 2010, the Museum Neukölln moved from its old location in the quarter Neukölln to Schloss Britz.

Since the mid-2000s, the northern quarter of Neukölln has entered a sustained process of gentrification, and the continuing growth of the quarter's urbanized and gentrified sphere is now slowly pushing the traditional northern demographics with their higher share of immigrants and lower-income citizenry southward, for example into Britz' Hufeisensiedlung and some city blocks north of Blaschkoallee.

== Locality subdivisions ==
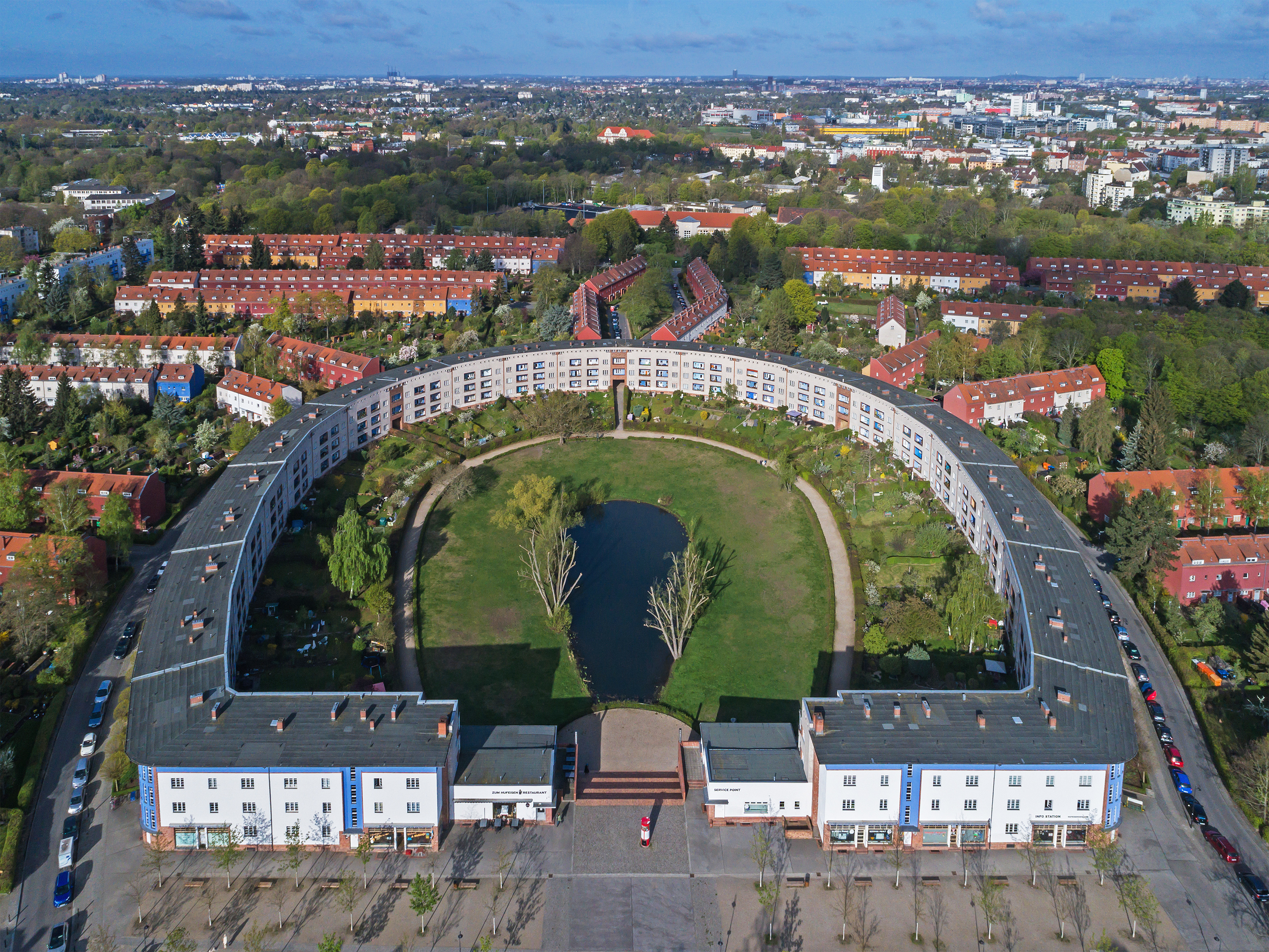
Hufeisensiedlung, 2017

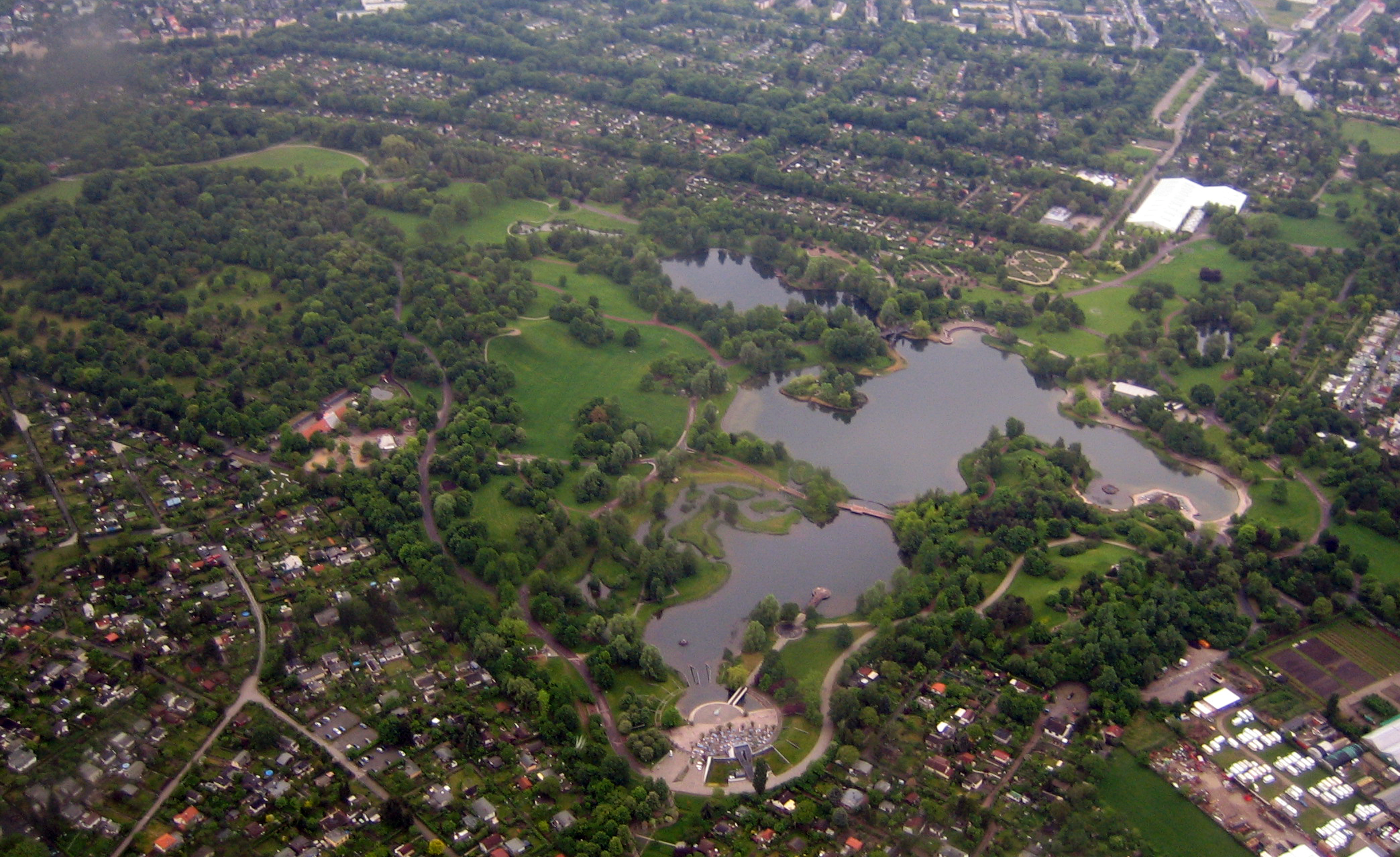
Britzer Garten in Neukölln's South

Neukölln is subdivided into five official quarters:

Quarter	Area (km^{2})	Inhabitants	Density (Inhabitants/km^{2})
0801 Neukölln	11.71	155,950	13,318
0802 Britz	12.40	39,029	3,148
0803 Buckow	6.35	38,219	6,019
0804 Rudow	11.81	40,733	3,449
0805 Gropiusstadt	2.67	35,751	13,390

== Transport ==
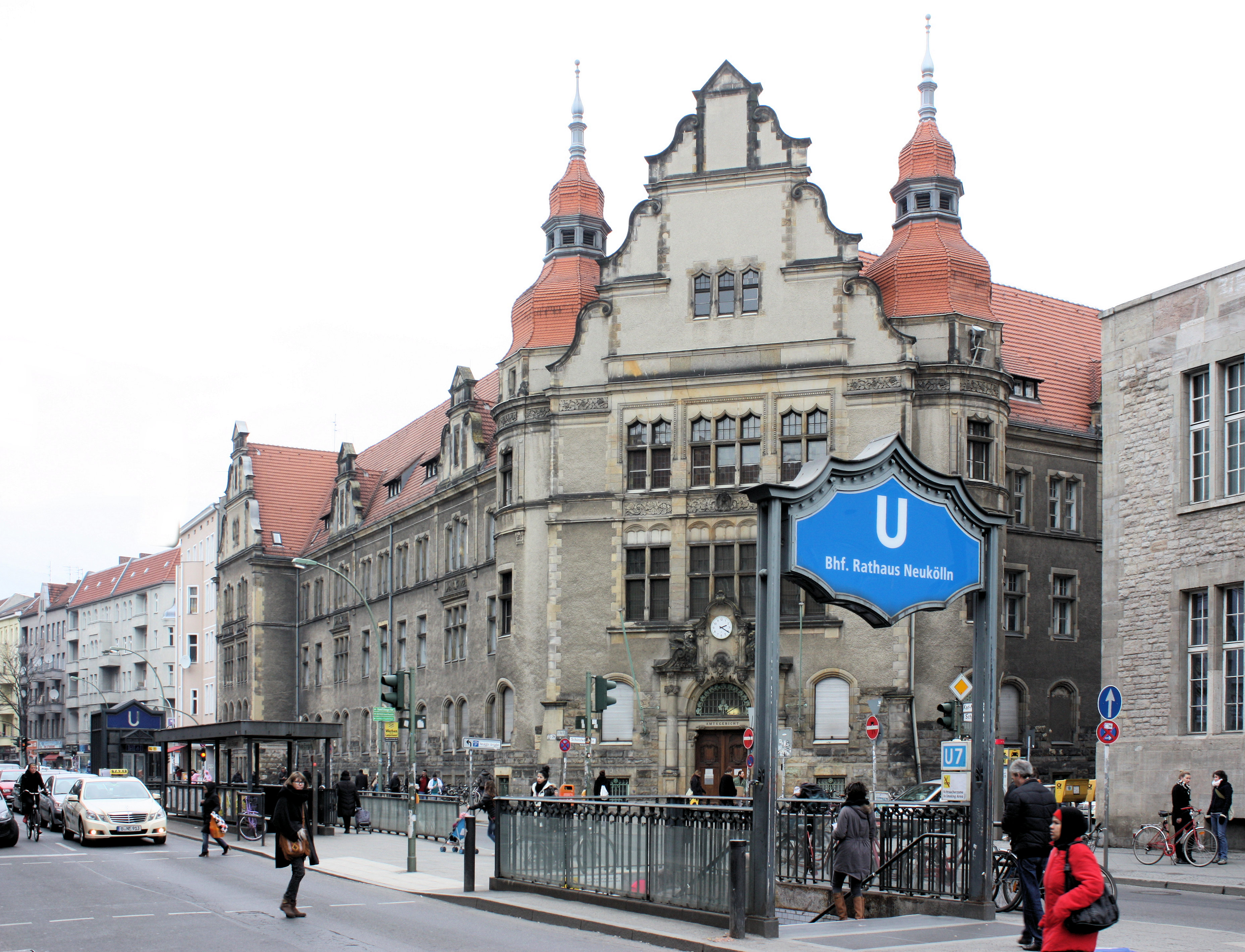
County-Court Building of Neukölln, near the Rathaus Neukölln U-Bahn station

Neukölln is served by an extensive multimodal transport network that connects the borough with the rest of Berlin, Brandenburg and Berlin Brandenburg Airport. Public transport is provided by the Berlin U-Bahn, Berlin S-Bahn and an extensive network of bus routes. The borough is served by the U7 and U8 U-Bahn lines, four S-Bahn lines, and major interchange stations at Hermannplatz, Hermannstraße and Berlin-Neukölln station.

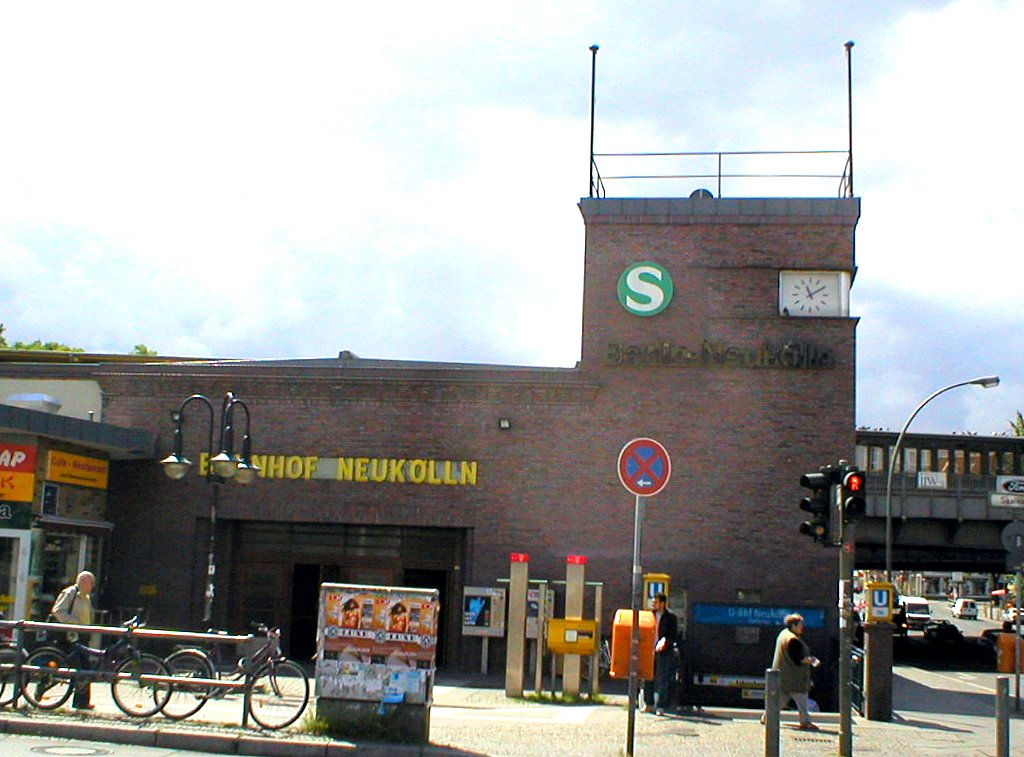
Berlin-Neukölln station

Road access is provided by the A100 and A113 autobahns together with several major arterial roads. Neukölln also has extensive cycling and pedestrian infrastructure, while the Neukölln Harbour and associated freight rail and waterway facilities continue to play an important role in the movement of goods. Future transport plans include extensions to the U-Bahn and tram networks, together with improvements to bus services and regional connectivity.

== Demographics ==
As of 2010, the borough had a population of 310,283, of whom 121,000 (38.9%) were of non-German ethnicity. The percentage is significantly higher in the locality of the same name, Neukölln. The borough is known for its large Turkish, Arab and Kurdish communities, which together make up roughly 18% of the borough's population. Recently, there has been an influx of Romani people and Sub-Saharan Africans.

Population by migration background
Ethnic Germans	60% (189,000)
Middle Eastern origin	18% (55,000)
non-German European origin	11% (33,000)
Afro-Germans	4% (12,400)
Others (East Asians, Americans, etc.)	6.5% (21,000)

=== Gentrification ===
A trend is the rapid gentrification of certain neighbourhoods within the borough. There has been an influx of students, creatives and other young professionals of mostly Western origin avoiding higher rents which are charged in other parts of Berlin. This has caused a knock-on effect, with rents rising in some parts of Neukölln. Northern Neukölln, just to the south of the Kreuzberg area, has become informally referred to as "Kreuzkölln" as the area becomes increasingly fashionable.

== Politics ==
=== District council ===
The governing body of Neukölln is the district council (Bezirksverordnetenversammlung). It has responsibility for passing laws and electing the city government, including the mayor. The most recent district council election was held on 26 September 2021, and the results were as follows:

Party	Lead candidate	Votes	%	+/-	Seats	+/-
Social Democratic Party (SPD)	Martin Hikel	41,104	28.7	▼1.7	18	▼1
Alliance 90/The Greens (Grüne)	Susann Worschech	25,238	17.6	▲2.7	11	▲2
Christian Democratic Union (CDU)	Falko Liecke	24,191	16.9	▲0.6	10	±0
The Left (LINKE)	Sarah Nagel	21,525	15.0	▲2.8	9	▲2
Alternative for Germany (AfD)	Julian Potthast	10,125	7.1	▼5.7	4	▼4
Free Democratic Party (FDP)	Roland Leppek	6,971	4.9	▲0.6	3	▲1
Tierschutzpartei		4,101	2.9	▲0.7	0	±0
Die PARTEI		2,909	2.0	▼0.4	0	±0
dieBasis		1,787	1.2	New	0	New
Klimaliste		1,451	1.0	New	0	New
Volt Germany		1,431	1.0	New	0	New
Free Voters		1,061	0.7	New	0	New
We are Berlin		843	0.6	New	0	New
Ecological Democratic Party		235	0.2	New	0	New
Liberal Conservative Reformers		192	0.1	New	0	New
Valid votes		143,164	98.9			
Invalid votes		1,655	1.1			
Total		144,819	100.0		55	±0
Electorate/voter turnout		225,767	64.1	▲6.5		
Source: Elections Berlin

=== District government ===
The district mayor (Bezirksbürgermeister) is elected by the Bezirksverordnetenversammlung, and positions in the district government (Bezirksamt) are apportioned based on party strength. Martin Hikel of the SPD was elected mayor on 21 March 2018. Since the 2021 municipal elections, the composition of the district government is as follows:

Councillor	Party	Portfolio
Martin Hikel	SPD	District Mayor; Civil Service and Logistics
Jochen Biedermann	GRÜNE	Deputy Mayor; Urban Development, Environment and Traffic
Falko Liecke	CDU	Social Affairs
Karin Korte	SPD	Education, Culture and Sport
Mirjam Blumenthal	SPD	Youth and Health
Sarah Nagel	LINKE	Public Order
Source: Berlin.de

== Notable people ==
Neukölln has been the birthplace or home of numerous figures in politics, the arts, science, architecture, sport, and public life. Notable people associated with the locality include architectural sculptor Lee Lawrie, actor Horst Buchholz, jurist Jutta Limbach, philosopher Susan Neiman, footballer Antonio Rüdiger, artist Lena Braun, and German president Frank-Walter Steinmeier, who was active in the borough before assuming national office. A separate list documents notable natives, residents, and other people closely associated with Neukölln from the medieval period to the present.

== In popular culture ==
- "Neuköln" (deliberately spelt with one 'l') is an instrumental piece by David Bowie, the ninth track on his 1977 album "Heroes".
- The last track of Miss Kittin's first solo album I Com is called "Neukölln 2".
- The German film Knallhart is set in the northern part of Neukölln.
- The German documentary Neukölln Unlimited tells the story of three Lebanese teenagers based in Neukölln, who fight their deportation out of Germany.
- Electronic music producer Kobosil is a native of the city. With a Bachelor of Arts in audio production, he has released music on the Ostgut Ton and MDT labels.
- The series 4 Blocks is set in Neukölln and Kreuzberg.
- The sixth leg of The Amazing Race 32 had its Pit Stop in Neukölln.

== Twin towns – sister cities ==
Neukölln is twinned with:

- Anderlecht, Belgium (1955)
- Bat Yam, Israel (1978)
- Boulogne-Billancourt, France (1955)
- Çiğli (İzmir), Turkey (2005)
- Cologne, Germany (1967)
- Hammersmith and Fulham (London), England, United Kingdom (1955)
- Leonberg, Germany (1970)
- Marino, Italy (1980)
- Pavlovsk (Saint Petersburg), Russia (1991)
- Prague 5 (Prague), Czech Republic (2005)
- Pushkin (Saint Petersburg), Russia (1991)
- Ústí nad Orlicí, Czech Republic (1989)
- Wetzlar, Germany (1959)
- Zaanstad, Netherlands (1955)

== Gallery ==
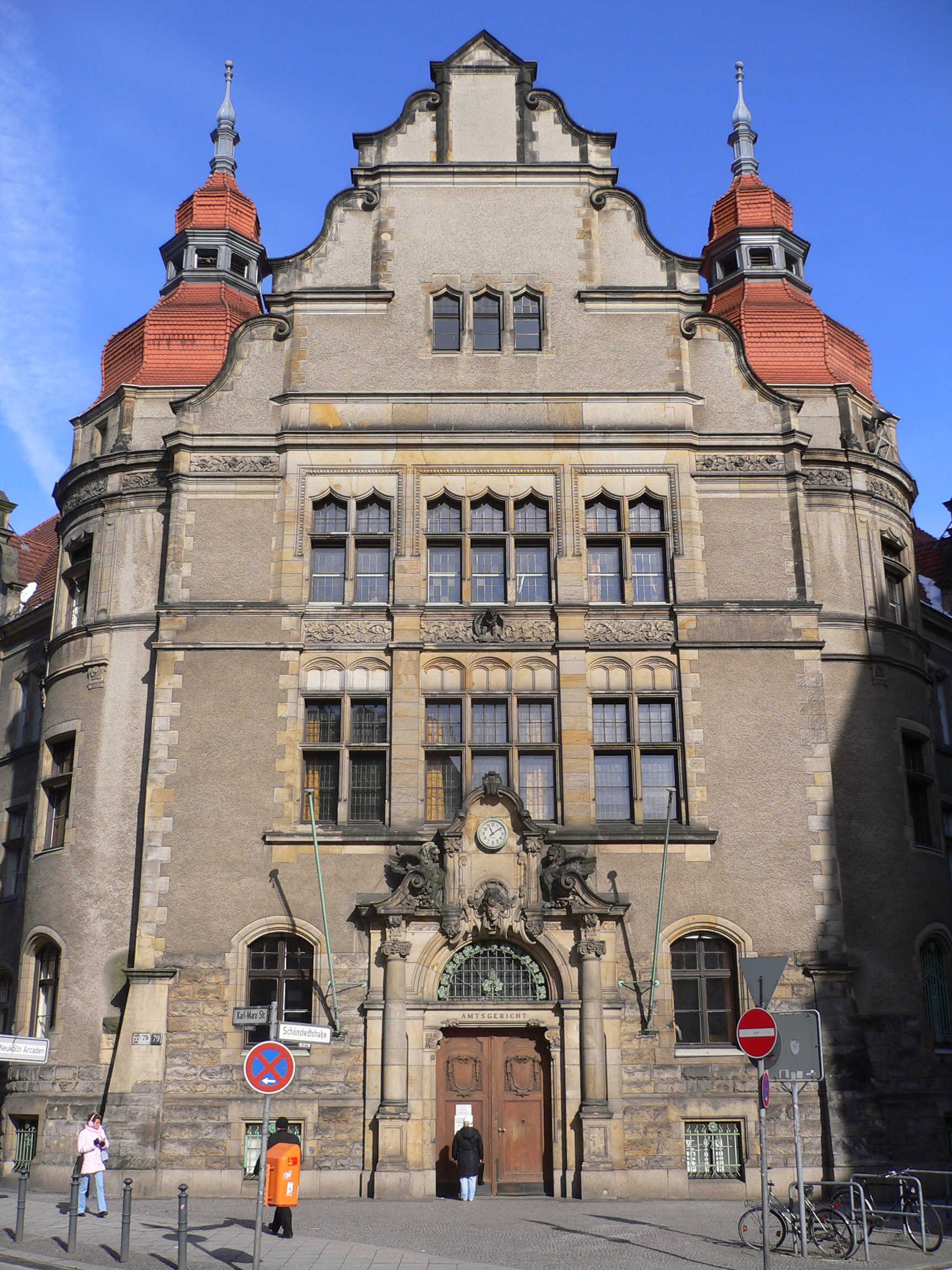
County Court

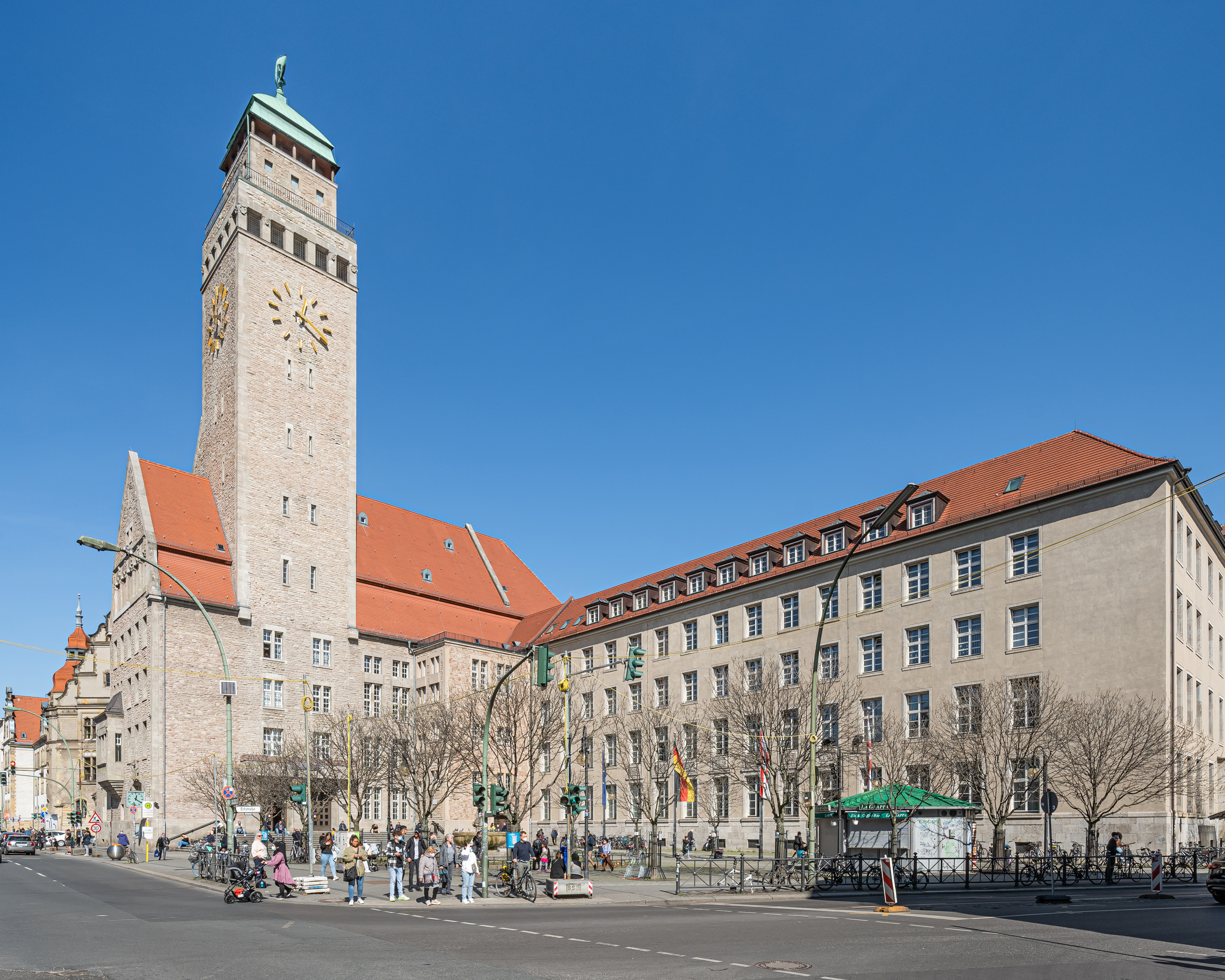
City hall

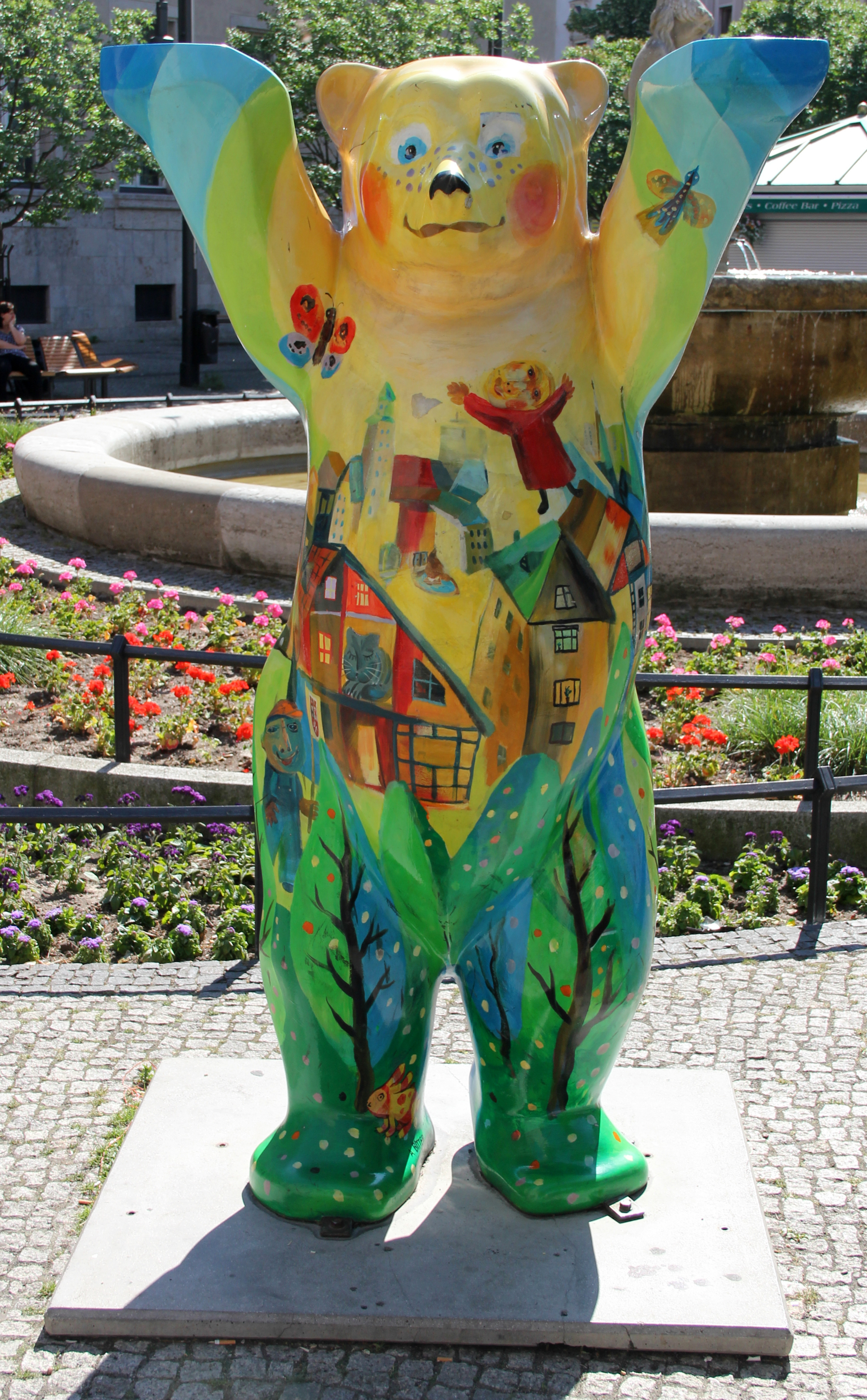
Buddy Bear Neukölln in front of the City hall

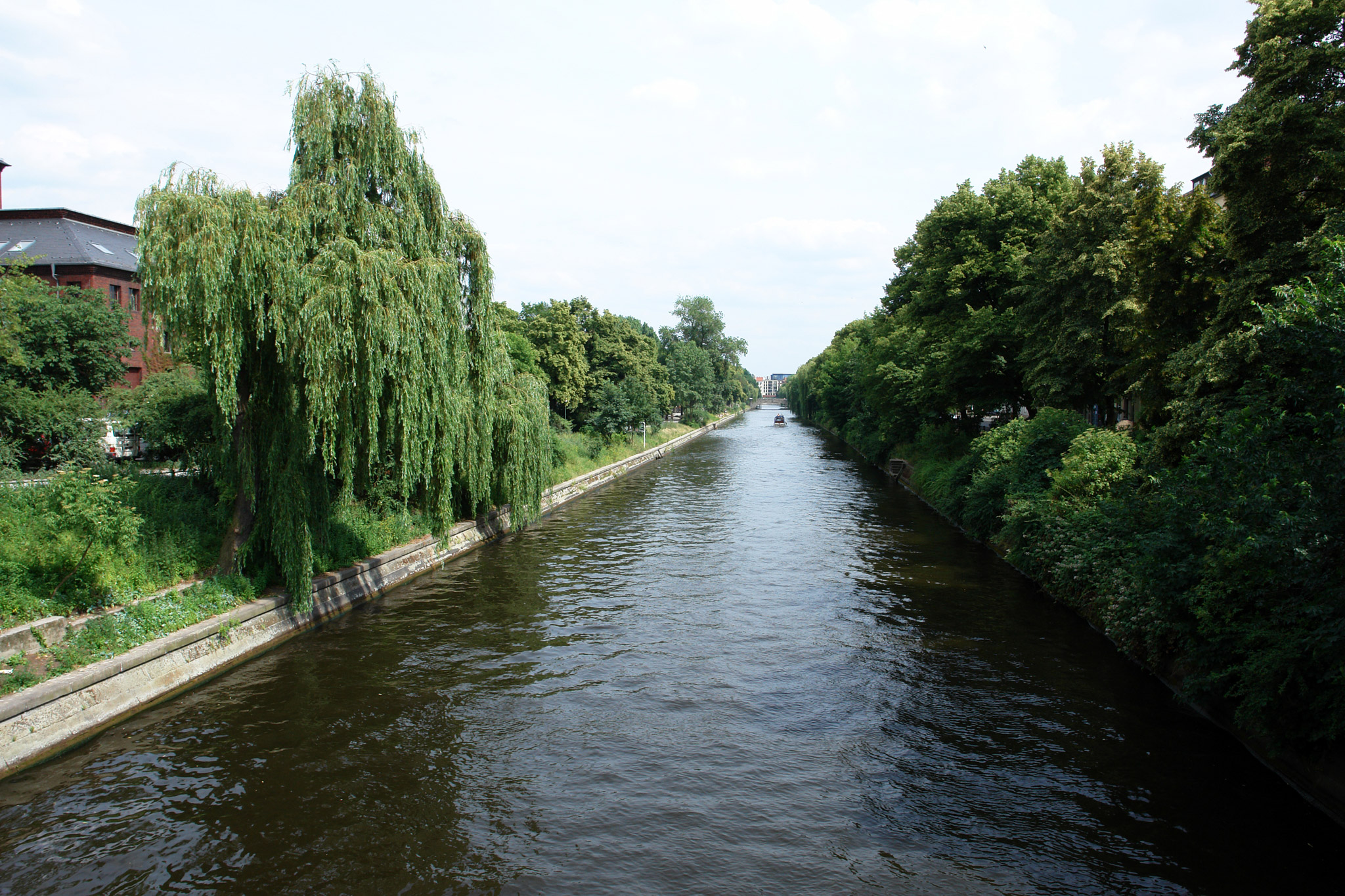
Landwehrkanal

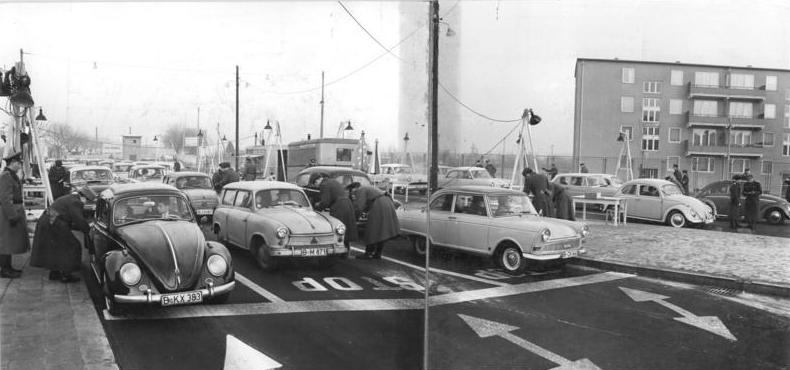
Border crossing at Sonnenallee, 1964

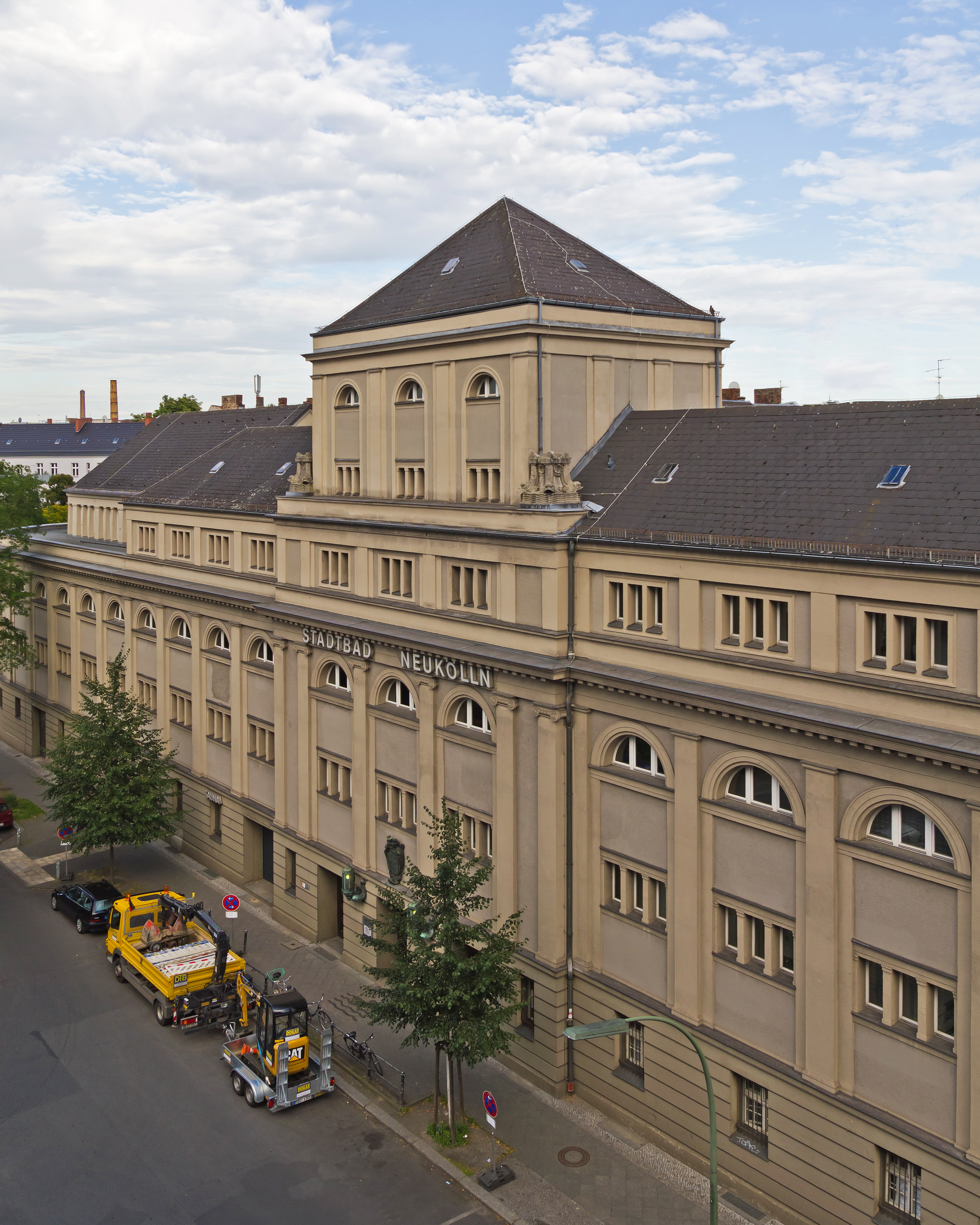
Stadtbad Neukölln

== See also ==
- Berlin-Neukölln (electoral district)
- Hermannplatz
- Hermannstraße (Berlin-Neukölln)
