= List of parks and gardens in Berlin =

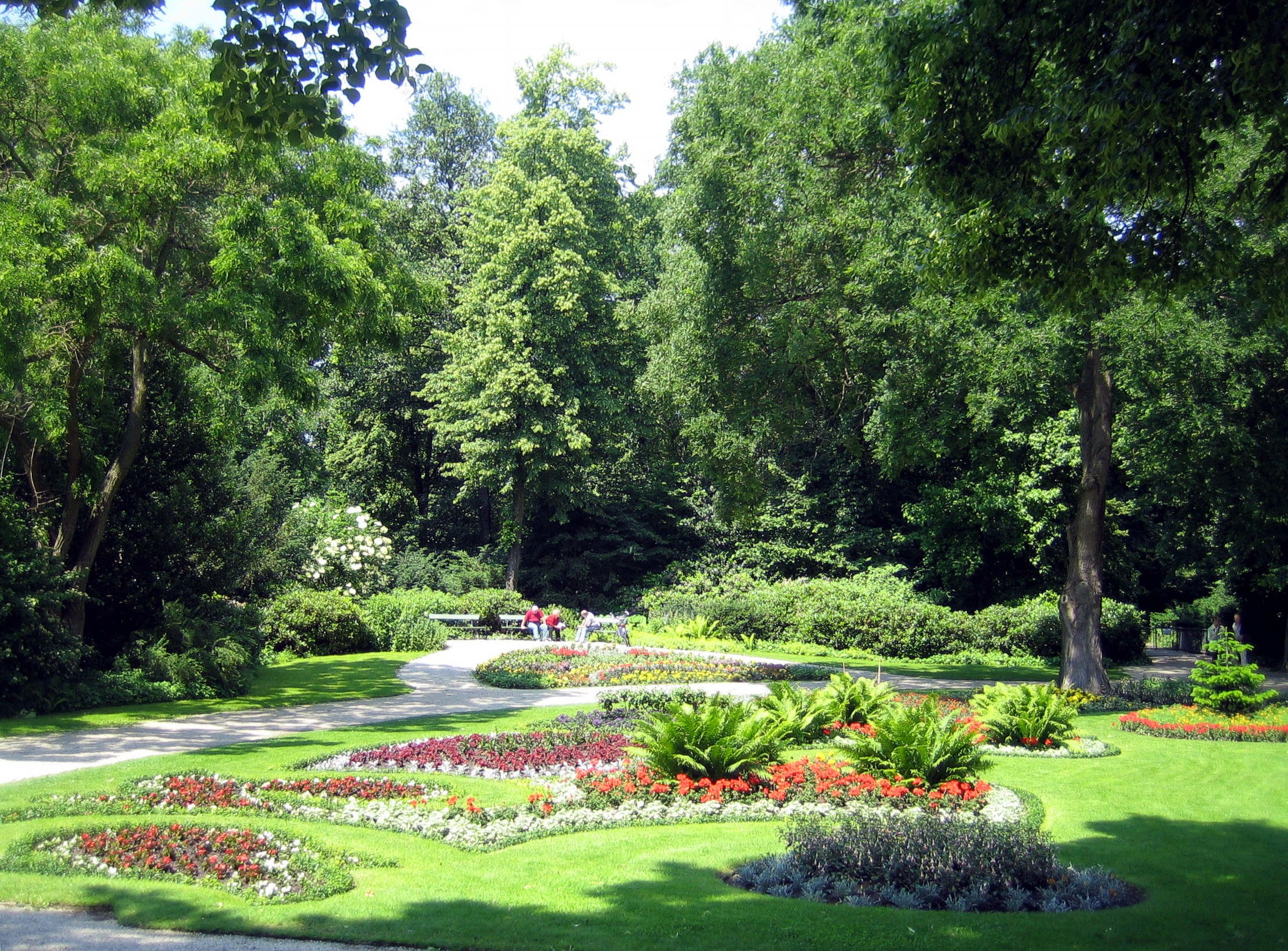
Luiseninsel at Großer Tiergarten

The following is a list of notable parks, gardens and outdoor spaces in Berlin, Germany.

== Zoos ==
- Berlin Zoological Garden
- Tierpark Berlin

== Parks ==
- Barnim Nature Park
- Großer Tiergarten
- Grunewald (forest)
- Henriette Herz Park
- Körnerpark
- Mauerpark
- Natur-Park Südgelände
- Pfaueninsel
- Treptower Park
- Tempelhofer Feld – A park opened in 2010 at the former site of Berlin Tempelhof Airport
- Theodor Wolff Park
- Viktoriapark
- Volkspark Friedrichshain
- Volkspark Hasenheide
- Volkspark Mariendorf

== Gardens ==
- Botanical Garden in Berlin
- Britzer Garten
- Erholungspark Marzahn

== See also ==
- Palaces and Parks of Potsdam and Berlin
