= Windmills in Berlin =

Around 1860, there were approximately 150 Windmills in Berlin and the surrounding villages, which were still independent at the time. Today, only eight remain within the city limits: four in their original locations (Britzer Mühle, Jungfernmühle, Adlermühle, Zehlendorfer Mühle), one new mill (Marzahn post mill), two relocated windmills in the German Museum of Technology (alongside a watermill), and one relocated mill in Gatow).

These eight windmills comprise five Dutch mills and three post mills. Beyond the surviving mills, about twenty street names, such as Mühlsteinweg (millstone path) and Am Mühlenberg (mill hill), and the coat of arms of the former Prenzlauer Berg district, featuring four black windmill sails on a golden shield, recall the heyday of Berlin’s windmills. The Britzer Mühle is notable as the only original mill still functional, offering a one-and-a-half-year course since 1987 to train hobby millers for certification. The also functional Marzahn post mill, built in 1994 and not historic, offers a similar non-vocational training programme.

== History ==
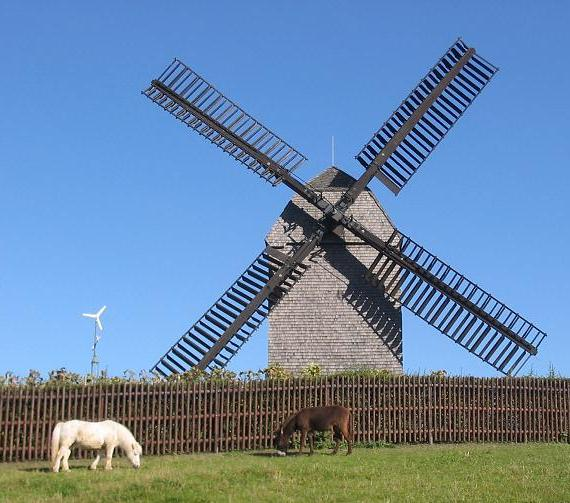
Marzahn Mühle, 2005

=== Cistercians and freedom of trade ===
In the high and late medieval economy, mill rights, tied to water rights, were highly lucrative and contested privileges. By the 13th century, two water mills operated in the Berlin area: the Panke Mill and a mill in Mühlendamm between Alt-Berlin and Cölln. Windmills emerged around 1375 in the villages of Buckow, Rudow, and the Lehniner monastery estate Celendorpe (now Zehlendorf). In the Zauche and Teltow regions, Cistercian monks from Lehnin pioneered mill construction, leveraging advanced technology. They owned 19 mills, generating at least 100 guilders per mill annually, with millers’ profits likely three to four times higher.

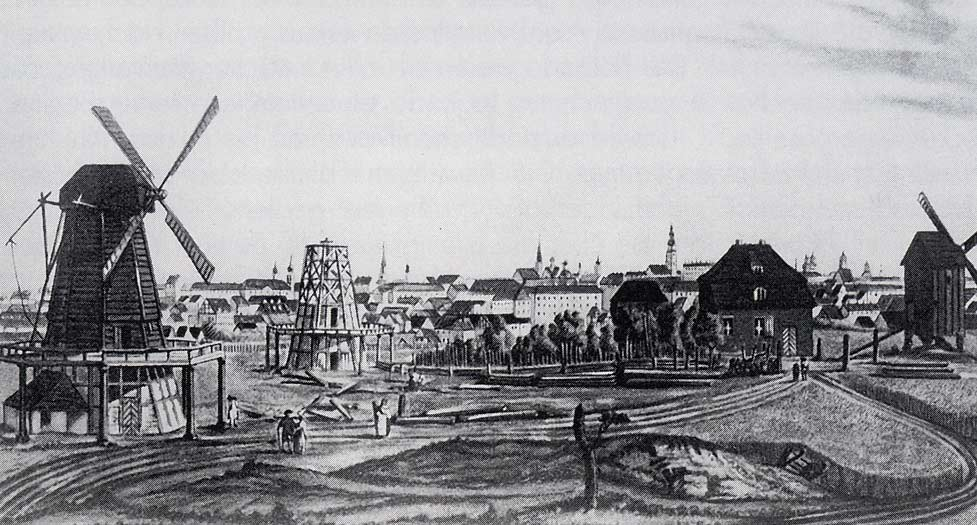
Prenzlauer Berg, formerly Windmühlenberg, c. 1800

The freedom of trade, introduced in Prussia in 1810 via the Stein-Hardenberg reforms, replaced guild restrictions, sparking a brief mill construction boom. By c. 1860, approximately 150 mills operated in Berlin and its surrounding villages, mostly outdated Post Mills due to limited capital, few millers could afford the more efficient but costlier Dutch Mills.

=== Four centres ===
Coat of arms of the former Prenzlauer Berg district

Four areas with high mill concentrations were developed. Around 30 mills stood on Prenzlauer Berg, including eight-grain mills along Windmühlenberg, which named the district. Its 1992 coat of arms features four black windmill sails on a golden shield, symbolizing Berlin’s largest mill hub. Eleven mills operated near Müllerstraße and Seestraße in Wedding. South of Schöneberg, eleven mills lined what was then Mühlenweg (now Badensche Straße). In Rixdorf, tanning and fulling mills predominated. As of 2005, over 20 street names, including ten called Mühlenstraße or Mühlenweg, and others like Mühlbergstraße, Mühlsteinweg, and Am Mühlenberg, commemorate these sites.

=== Berlin Mühlenberge ===
Berlin Mühlenberge was sited on the 15-metre-thick Barnim and Teltow plateaus, ground moraine formations from the Saale and Weichselian glaciations, partly covered by terminal moraine hills. Glacial meltwater from c. 15,000 years ago deposited marl and sand, forming tundra-like hills ideal for windmills. On the Nauen Plateau’s slopes, extending to the western Havel lowlands, Gatower Windmühlenberg hosts a historic mill site, now a protected area with rare sand dry grassland flora.

=== Steam power and electrification ===
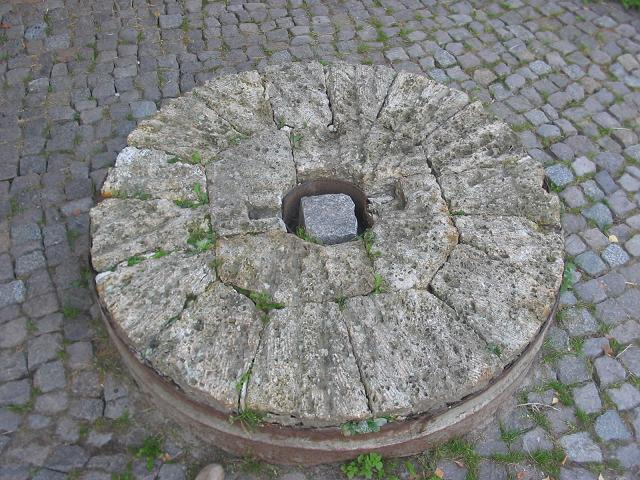
Millstone, Britzer Mühle, 2005

Steam power, introduced c. 1870, rendered most wind- and water-powered mills uncompetitive, triggering the first mill decline. Electrification and large-scale mill development caused a second decline, reducing ~150 mills to a handful by 1945. The last operational windmill, the motorized Jungfernmühle in Buckow, ceased milling in 1980.

== Preserved windmills, original stock ==
=== Britzer Mühle ===
52°25′55″N 13°26′1″W

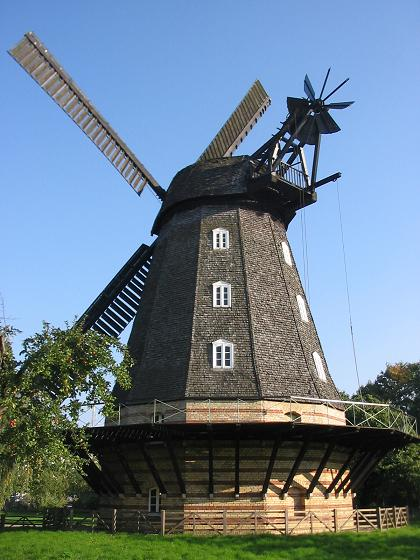
Britzer Mühle, 2005

The Britzer Mühle at Buckower Damm 130 in Britz, formerly Stechan’sche Mühle, is a 12-sided gallery Dutch windmill, built in 1866 and functional. It stands 20 metres high, with a 25-metre sail diameter. A wind rose automatically turns the cap, mounted on cast iron rollers, into the wind. Named after miller Karl Albert August Stechan, who purchased it for 19,000 thalers in 1874, the mill is managed by Grün Berlin Park und Garten GmbH, located near the Britzer Garten (former BUGA 1985) on the edge of an orchard.

The Britzer Müllerei e.V. association organizes guided tours and a one-and-a-half-year course to train certified millers. The mill sells its bread and hosts weddings, as does the Marzahn post mill. Visitors can explore individually or via guided tours.

=== Adlermühle in Mariendorf ===
52°25′21.7″N 13°23′36.58″E

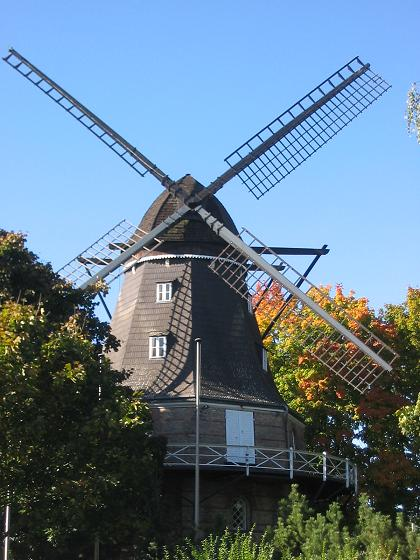
Adlermühle, Mariendorf, 2005

The Adlermühle at Buchsteinweg 32–34 in Mariendorf, an octagonal gallery Dutch windmill built in 1889, has been a listed monument since 1963.

The former corn mill now serves as a clubhouse and leisure centre for the Berliner Schwimmverein Friesen 1895 e.V., which funded renovations with public and private support. It hosts events like Whitsun concerts, guided tours on open days, and exhibitions during “German Mill Day,” organized by the German Society for Mill History and Preservation. A first-floor room for up to 50 people is available for hire. The mill is accessible during opening hours.

=== Zehlendorfer Mühle ===
52°26′27.87″N 13°16′37.87″E

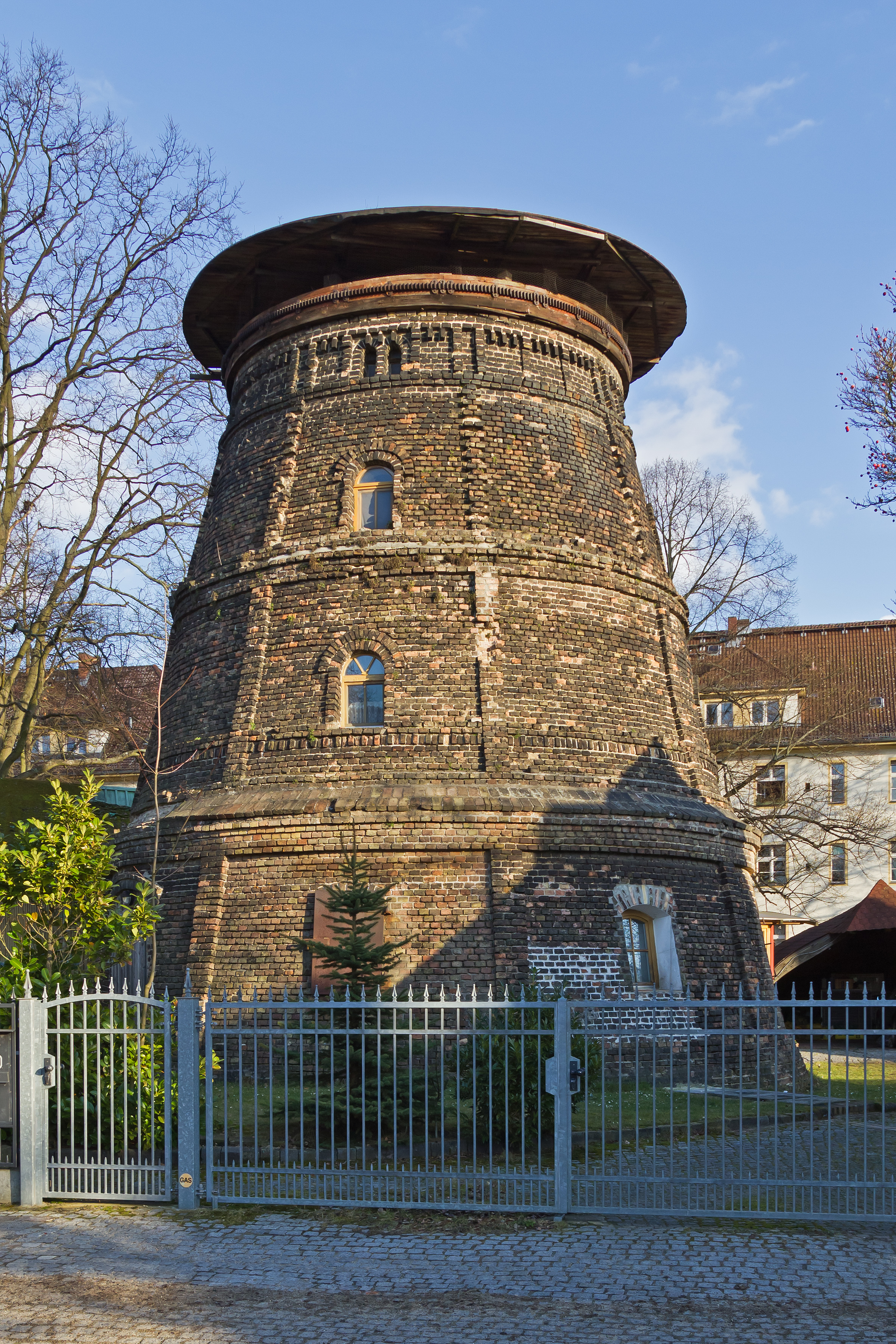
Zehlendorfer Mühle, 2014

The Zehlendorfer Mühle, located between Schlettstadter Straße and Berliner Straße 75 near Zehlendorf’s former Mühlenpark, is a rare round Dutch windmill. Built in 1881 (possibly 1879 or 1880) for miller Radlow, this corn mill is no longer functional. Since 1943–1944, it has lacked sails, cap, and gallery, retaining only its three-storey brick walls.

This was the third mill to be established in Zehlendorf. It succeeded a post mill documented in the Landbuch of Emperor Charles IV in 1375, likely constructed by the Cistercian monks of Lehnin Abbey, who were renowned for their milling expertise. The first mill, at the village’s southern exit, was demolished in 1875 for railway expansion. In 1880, two new mills were constructed, one on Sundgauer Straße was demolished after five years, while the Zehlendorfer Mühle endures.

By 1898, operations shifted to a petroleum-powered engine, replaced by an electric motor in 1921. Sails were removed in 1943–1944 to avoid aiding enemy aircraft navigation. As a listed monument, the privately owned mill faced disputes over preservation costs from the 1950s. By 1997, a private investor renovated it into a private residence, restoring the foundations and preserving the historic brick façade and wooden windows in consultation with conservationists.

=== Jungfernmühle in Gropiusstadt ===
52°25′55.66″N 13°28′4.92″E

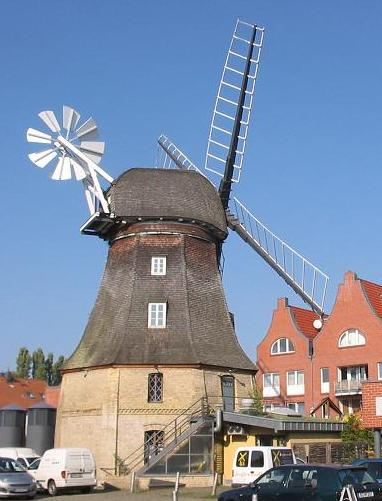
Jungfernmühle, Gropiusstadt, 2005

The Jungfernmühle (Wienecke’sche Mühle), an octagonal gallery Dutch windmill at Goldammerstraße 34 in Gropiusstadt, is Berlin’s oldest surviving corn mill, built in 1757 (possibly 1753). Non-functional, it retains shutter sails and a decorative wind rose. It operated economically until 1980 using electric power, the last Berlin windmill to do so. Originally built in Potsdam’s Amtsacker near the Nauen Gate by Dutch carpenter Adrian den Ouden, linked to Potsdam’s Dutch Quarter, the mill was relocated to Rixdorf’s Rollbergen in 1860 by Johann Wilhelm Blankenberg.

The name Jungfernmühle stems from a reported 1757 incident in Potsdam, where the miller’s daughter was killed by rotating sails and fell to the gallery. A commemorative oak carving of her image was placed under the mill’s shaft, reportedly preserved today.

== New and relocated windmills ==
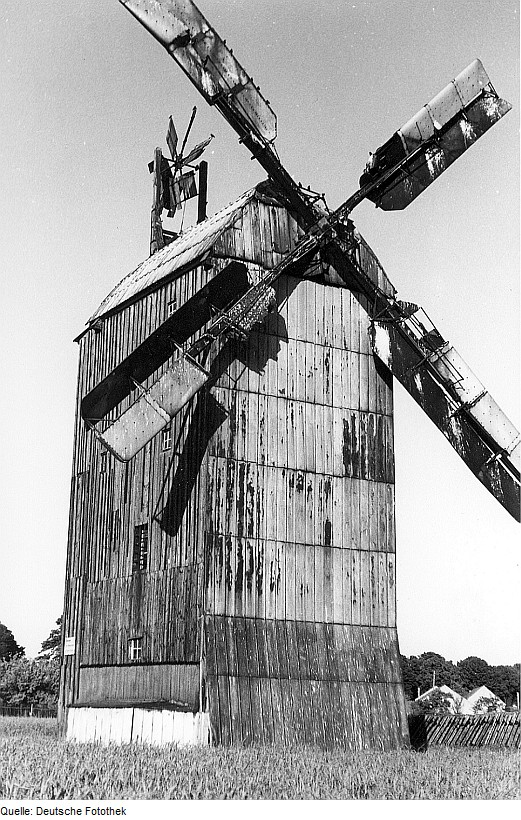
Paltrockmühle in Saalow, Am Mellensee, relocated from Berlin in 1903, 1973

While some windmills were relocated to Berlin, others were moved out during the Gründerzeit, when expanding residential estates reduced wind availability. For instance, a mill from Schöneberg was relocated to Mariendorf in 1888 and then to Saalow, a district of Am Mellensee, in 1903. This Paltrock windmill, restored in 1974–1975, remains operational. Paltrock and post mills, with their modular wooden construction, were designed for easy dismantling and reassembly.

=== Marzahnermühle, built in 1994 ===
52°32′38.55″N 13°33′48.76″E

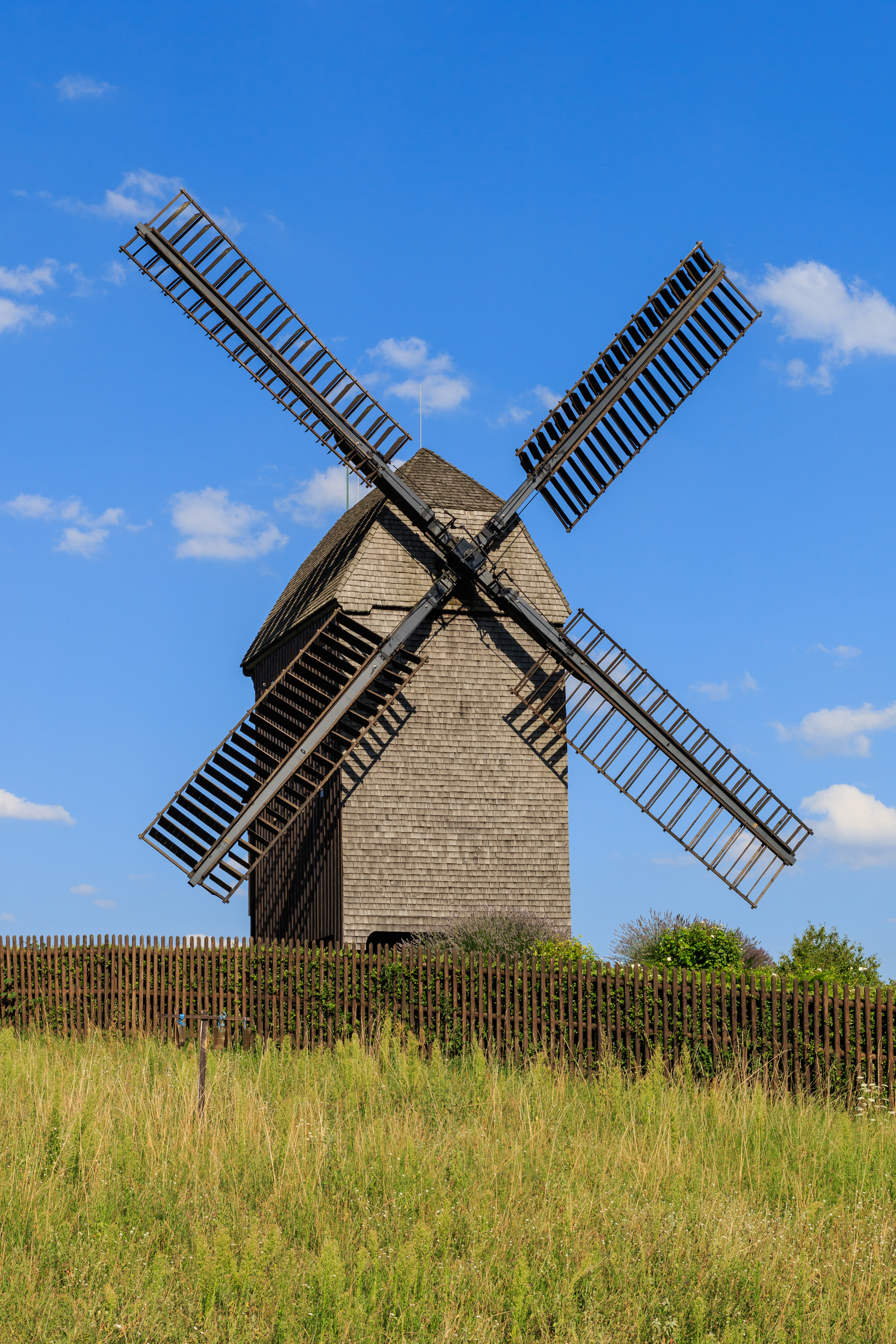
Marzahner Mühle, 2015

The Marzahner Mühle, a post mill built in 1994 by Dutch mill builder Harrie Beijk on Hinter der Mühle Street, is Berlin’s only non-museum post mill. Fully functional alongside the Britzer Mühle, it features shutter sails, a grist mill, a double hexagonal sifter, a crusher, a grinding machine, and an Askania sifter. With a 20.5-metre sail diameter and 44-tonne weight, it produces up to 1,000 kilograms of rye or wheat flour daily, operating 200 days annually at 8–12 kilowatts. A small wind turbine nearby serves as an anemometer.

The mill offers training courses on historical milling, similar to Britzer Mühle, and is open for visits and guided tours. Located on a hill near Marzahn’s historic village green, it is surrounded by enclosures for geese, sheep, horses, and donkeys, and displays historical agricultural equipment. Set among Marzahn’s high-rise prefabricated buildings at Landsberger Allee and Allee der Kosmonauten, the mill creates a striking contrast with the modern district.

The three predecessor mills of this new building date back to 1815, when the first Marzahn miller, Christian Friedrich Krüger, had a post mill built. This first mill, the subsequent buildings from 1873 and 1908, and the current new building were spread across three locations in Marzahn. In 1978, the GDR acquired the last mill, which consisted only of a brick tower with a wingless steel frame, and had it demolished. Four years later, the East Berlin magistrate decided to rebuild it to enhance the design of the Marzahn village centre. Originally, the plans had envisaged the construction of a Dutch windmill. However, due to social upheavals, this was never realised. The first miller found the job in 1994 in response to a job advertisement that attracted ten applicants.

=== Foline Dutch mühle in the Technical Museum ===
52°29′44.94″N 13°22′32.75″E

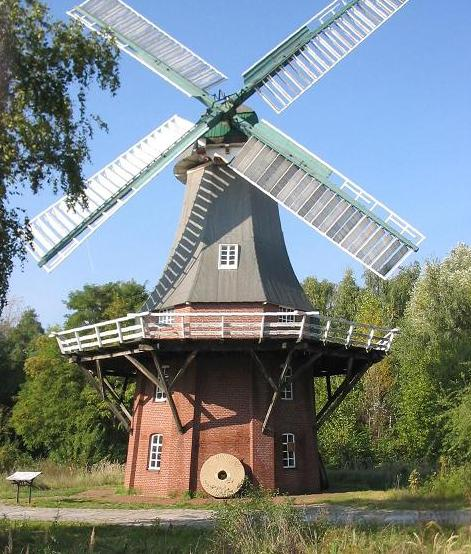
Dutch mill Foline, 2005

The very small, octagonal gallery Dutch windmill Foline came from Poghausen, a district of Uplengen in East Frisia, to the German Museum of Technology in Kreuzberg and was installed in 1985. The complete grain mill, equipped with a wind rose and shutter blades, is wind-powered and occasionally in operation, although the tall trees in front of it restrict free airflow. Originally a pure grist mill, it is fitted with an additional small motor mill featuring a crusher, roller mill, and sifter. The name Foline is a typical Old East Frisian female name.

The two mills of the Technical Museum are located in an atypical setting, surrounded by trees, within the six-hectare museum park. This park is situated on the site of the long-disused railway depot of the former Anhalter Bahnhof railway station. Much like the nearby Schöneberger Südgelände Nature Park, with its motto "Groundbreaking Nature," which has been protected as a nature park since 2000, decades of untouched nature have fostered rare and diverse species for Berlin, spreading across the old railway grounds. On 2 September 2011, the Ostpark (East Park) of the Park am Gleisdreieck was opened on this site, with its western path leading directly past the two windmills. The mills are visible from this public path but are inaccessible, as the museum grounds are separated from the park by a fence.

=== Bohnsdorf Bockwindmühle in the Museum of Technology ===
52°29′47.24″N 13°22′35.24″E

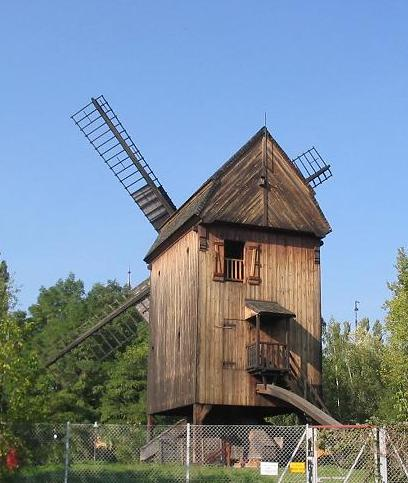
Bohnsdorf trestle windmill in the open-air grounds of the Museum of Technology, 2005

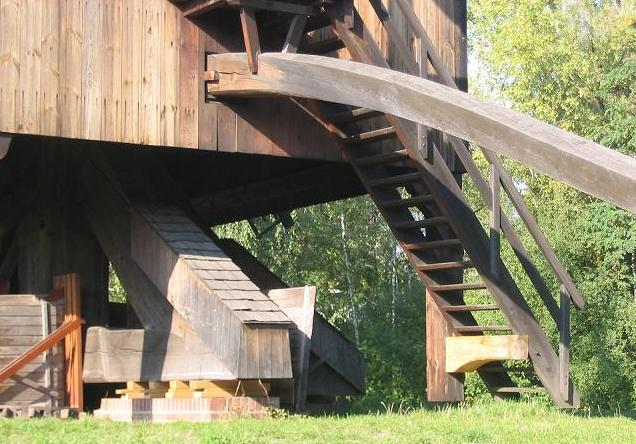
Bohnsdorf trestle windmill, view of trestle and codend, 2005

In the outdoor area of the Technology Museum stands another windmill, the Bohnsdorfer Bockwindmühle. This mill, approximately 14 meters high with door wings spanning a diameter of about 20 meters, is wind-powered, equipped with a grist mill and bag mechanism, and was occasionally in operation. During a visit to the mill in November 2022, the sails were no longer mounted, and the remains of one sail lay decayed on the ground nearby.

The building, originally called the Vollkropfmühle (wholemeal mill) or, after one of its owners, the Staberow'sche Mühle (Staberow mill), dates back to 1820. It stood on Grünauer Straße near Köpenick until 1874, when it was relocated to Bohnsdorf, Glienicker Straße 508. It was listed as a historic monument in 1958, dismantled in 1983, and rebuilt on the grounds of the Technikmuseum in the same year. Although this mill remained in Berlin, it is not considered one of the preserved historical mills in its original location due to its relocation to the museum.

The older names of the mill appear in official records, such as Wuhlkropfmühle (1820) or Vollkropfs Mühle (1850). According to analyses by Gerhard Schlimpert, a name researcher for Teltow, the name derives from the Vollkropf, recorded as an official forest in 1704. The name is commemorated between Glienicker Weg and the Spree by a remnant of the Vollkropfgraben and the small biotope Vollkropfwiesen on the ditch. These wet and marshy meadows, featuring nutrient-poor grassland and reed beds, are protected nature reserves.

Since a Slavic settlement was found in the extensive area south of the Spree River, this could suggest an old Slavic deserted village name. However, there is no evidence to support this, and no consistent etymological derivation exists for the name Vollkropf. Derivations from Middle Low German Krop (meaning "growth," "goitre," or "throat") are considered implausible by Schlimpert, as the dialect form is absent, and the prefix Voll- (also appearing as Vulc-) remains unclear.

=== Reconstructed Bockwindmühle in Gatow ===
52°29′10.95″N 13°10′40.39″E

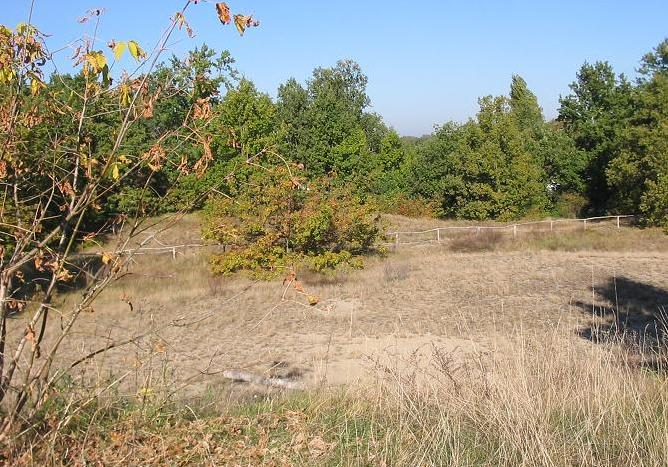
Windmühlenberg Gatow with sandy dry grassland flora

Since 2004, Berlin has had another windmill, initially dismantled, which, according to the buyer, closely resembles the one in the Technical Museum. It was relocated from Metzelthin, a district of Wusterhausen/Dosse in Prignitz, to Gatow, Buchwaldzeile 43. The construction of the mill, originally planned for a site near Wriezen in the Oderbruch, began in 2004 and was completed in 2008.

The mill is located on the historic Windmühlenberg (Windmill Hill), known for its rare sand dry grassland flora, situated within a small settlement. This area has been protected as the Windmühlenberg Nature Reserve since 9 February 2002. Until 1921 (not 1923, as often stated), an older Gatow windmill, built in 1845 (though some sources cite 1824 or 1844), stood on the 52-meter-high hill. This mill met a dramatic end when it was deliberately set alight for a film by director Richard Eichberg (1888–1952). The mill’s owner, a local baker, had sold the dilapidated and disused structure to the film’s production company, which burned the wooden mill for the final scene. Research by the Förderverein Historisches Gatow (Gatow Historical Society) revealed that Eichberg’s film was the silent film Die Liebesabenteuer der schönen Evelyne, also known in German as Die Mordsmühle auf Evenshill. This film, a precursor to Eichberg’s 1938 remake of Joe May’s Das Indische Grabmal (The Indian Tomb, Part 1: Der Tiger von Eschnapur), premiered on 23 December 1921 in Berlin. The film was banned in the United States and deemed unsuitable for minors in the German Reich. Its fate remains unclear, with surviving copies presumed lost. The cast included Lee Parry, Oskar Sima in one of his earliest roles, Karl Falkenberg, and Felix Hecht.

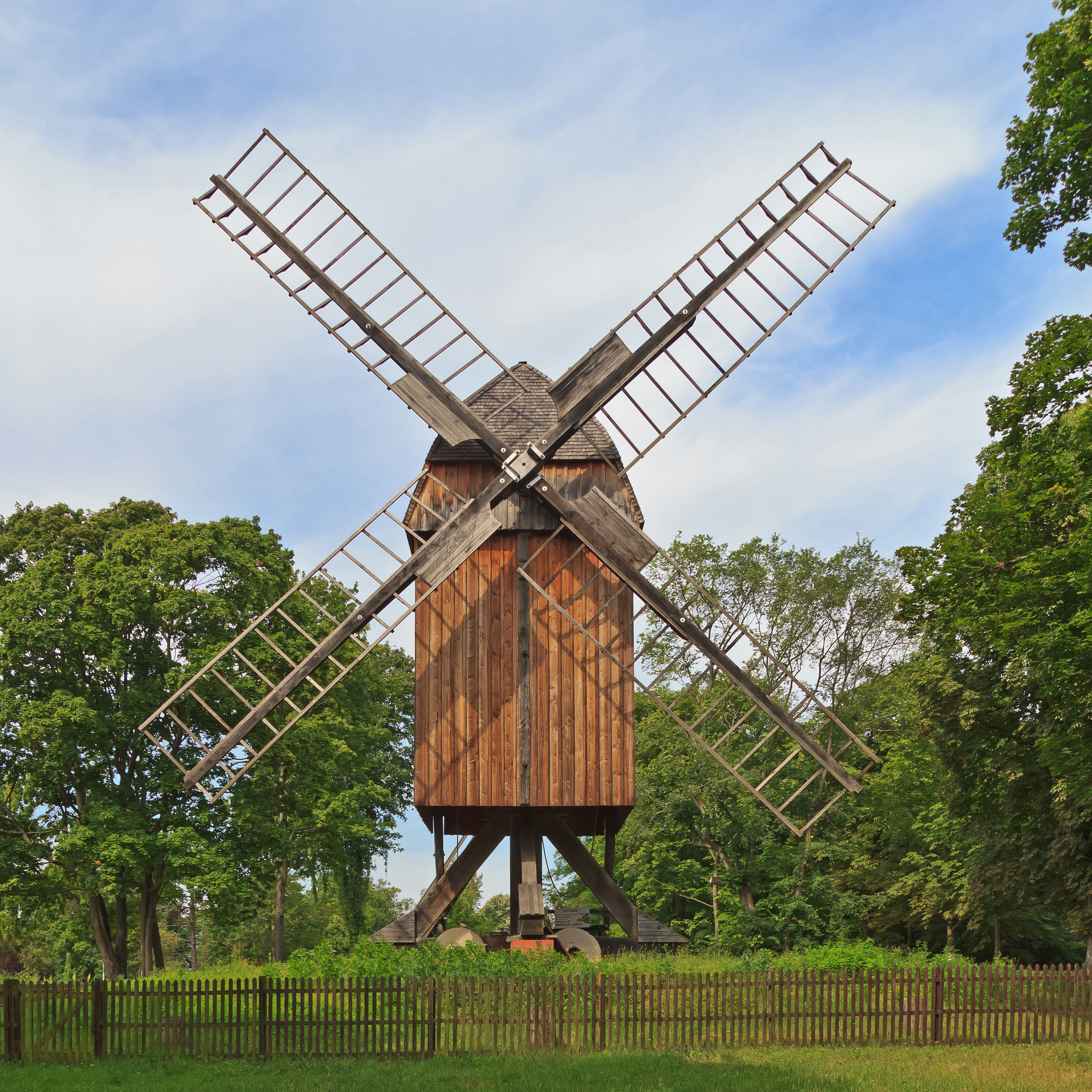
The trestle windmill in Gatow, rebuilt in 2008, 2014

The Gatow Association purchased the new mill for approximately €4,000 from the bankruptcy estate of a company that had intended to donate it to the town of Wriezen. The dismantled mill was stored at a freight yard in the Oderbruch region. According to the association, the roughly 225-year-old mill closely resembles the original Gatow mill that burned down. In consultation with authorities, a site was selected on the edge of the conservation area, near an old water tower, where the mill could be constructed in compliance with nature conservation requirements. The project was delayed from October 2005 to October 2006 due to an appeal against the building permit on neighbourhood law grounds. The objection was rejected in 2006, and construction began in October 2006. Trainees from the Knobelsdorff School, led by master carpenter Wellner, played a key role in the construction.

The "christening" of the nearly completed mill took place on 6 September 2008 in the presence of Governing Mayor Klaus Wowereit during a ceremony. After 87 years, windmill blades once again turned on Gatower Berg. The entire project cost approximately €180,000, funded by €150,000 in lottery money, €30,000 from the association’s funds, and countless hours of volunteer labour. In 2008, Gatow celebrated its 750th anniversary, 1258–2008. The logo for this celebration featured a Bock windmill, representing both the former and newly restored landmark of the village.

== See also ==
- History of wind energy utilisation

== Bibliography ==
- Bost, Gerald (2016). Die Britzer Mühle – Ein technisches Denkmal mit bewegter Geschichte [The Britzer Mill – A Technical Monument with a Turbulent History] (in German). Berlin: terra press. ISBN 978-3-942917-24-7.
- Britzer Garten, ed. (1991). Britzer Mill (Brochure). Berlin.
- Haas, Micaela; Varchmin, Joachim (2002). Mühlen gestern und morgen, Wind- und Wasserkraft in Berlin und Brandenburg [Mills Yesterday and Tomorrow, Wind and Water Power in Berlin and Brandenburg] (in German). Nümbrecht: Martina Galunder Verlag. ISBN 3-89909-009-8.
- Herzberg, Heinrich; Rieseberg, Hans Joachim (1986). Mühlen und Müller in Berlin. Ein Beitrag zur Geschichte der Produktivkräfte [Mills and Millers in Berlin. A Contribution to the History of Productive Forces.] (in German). Berlin.
- Schlimpert, Gerhard (1972). Brandenburgisches Namenbuch. Teil 3. Die Ortsnamen des Teltow [Brandenburg Name Book. Part 3. The Place Names of Teltow] (in German). Weimar: Hermann Böhlaus Nachf. pp. 214, 251–252.
- Warnatsch, Stephan (2000) [1999]. Geschichte des Klosters Lehnin 1180–1542. Studien zur Geschichte, Kunst und Kultur der Zisterzienser [History of Lehnin Monastery 1180–1542. Studies on the History, Art, and Culture of the Cistercians.] (in German). Vol. 12.1. Berlin: Lukas Verlag. pp. 276–279. ISBN 3-931836-45-2.
- Wolf, Jürgen (1999). "Die Bockwindmühle in Marzahn" [The Bockwind Mill in Marzahn]. Berlinische Monatsschrift (in German) (5). Luisenstädtischer Bildungsverein. ISSN 0944-5560.
- Rieseberg, Hans Joachim (1983). "Catalog for the Exhibition at Domäne Dahlem from May 20 to August 28, 1983.". In Verein der Freunde der Domäne Dahlem (ed.). Mühlen in Berlin [Mills in Berlin.] (in German). Berlin: Medusa Verlagsgesellschaft. ISBN 3-88602-077-0.
- Ogden, D.; Bost, G. (2010). Ganzel & Wulff – The Quest for American Milling Secrets. TIMS Bibliotheka Molinologica. Vol. 20. International Molinological Society. ISBN 978-92-9134-025-5.
- Peschke, Werner (1937). Das Mühlenwesen in der Mark Brandenburg. Von den Anfängen der Mark bis um 1600. Dissertation [The Milling System in the Mark Brandenburg. From the Beginnings of the Mark to Around 1600] (in German). Berlin: VDI-Verlag.
