= Britzer Garten =

Park in Berlin

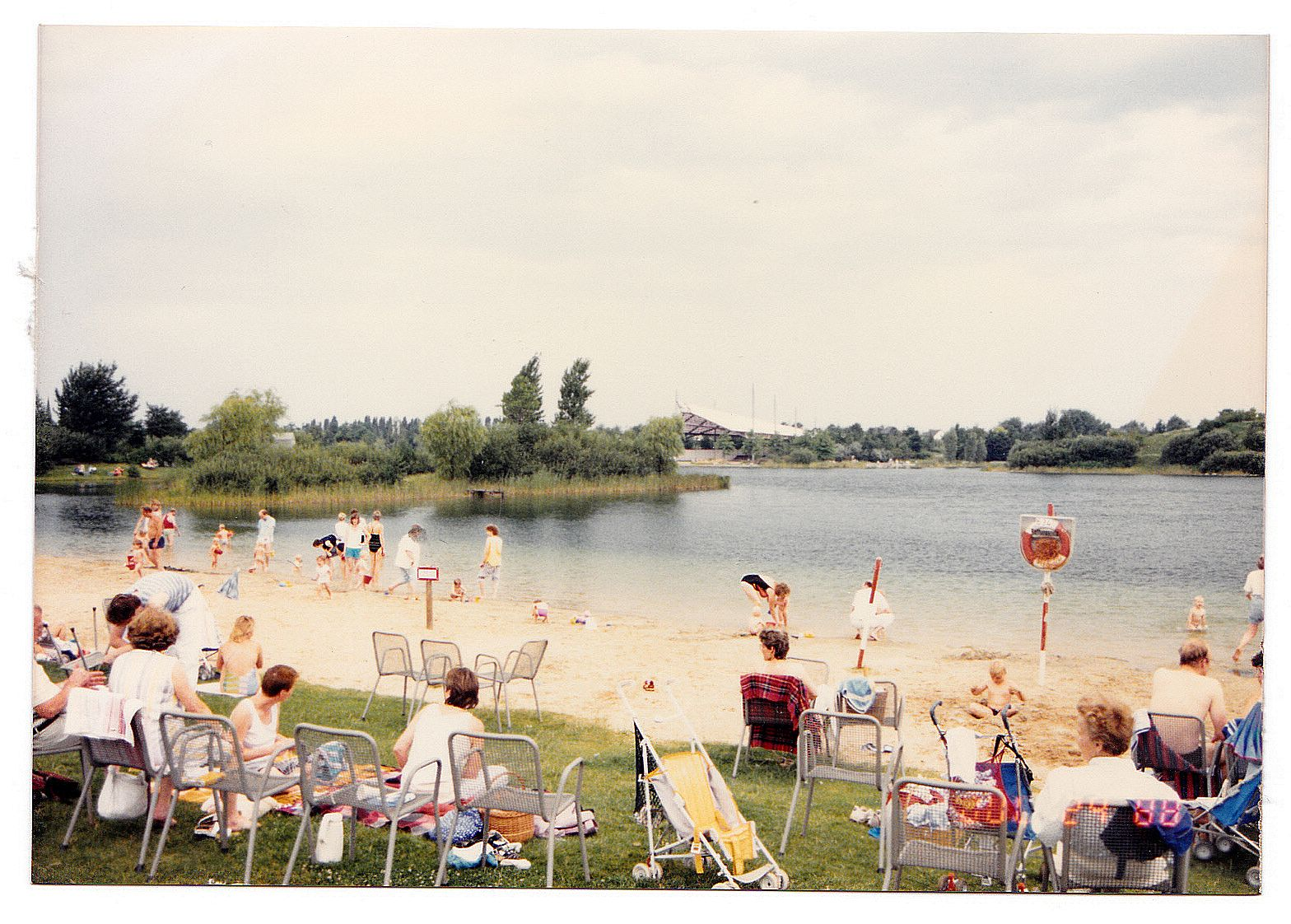
- Interactive map of Britzer Garten
- Location: Berlin, Germany
- Coordinates: 52°26′N 13°25′E
- Area: 90 ha (220 acres)
- Established: 1985
- Open: 1989
- Website: gruen-berlin.de/britzer-garten

The Britzer Garten (English: Britzer Garden) is a large park in Berlin, named after Britz, a neighborhood of the borough of Neukölln. It was constructed for the Bundesgartenschau 1985, in order to provide a new landscape park to the citizens in the southeast of West-Berlin, who were at that time cut off from the surrounding countryside.

== About ==
The park covers an area of 90 hectares (220 acres) and offers nature and garden architecture (rose garden, rhododendron woods), playgrounds, lakes and hills as well as multicolored flower patches, matching the particular season and extensive lawns for any leisure activities. Visitors are charged a small entrance fee at the gates. The main entrance is situated at the Buckower Damm, near the park cemetery in Neukölln. Dogs and bicycles are not allowed.

Architecture and art play a vital role in the park. Along the restaurant at the "Kalenderplatz" the largest sundial of Europe and a solar system walkway, measuring 99 metres (325 ft) in diameter can be seen. It was planned by architects Juergen Dirk Zilling, Jasper Halfmann and Klaus Zillich. The "Café am See" was built in 1985 by the architect Engelbert Kremser, using his earthwork technology. The sculpture Fette Henne (Berlin-Neukölln), artwork in the Britzer Garten by artist Rolf Szymanski is at the entrance. Many special events also take place there, including concerts (classical and other) sometimes accompanied by fireworks.

The Britzer Museumsbahn (English: Britzer Museum Railway), runs on a narrow-gauge track through the Britzer Garten. Some engines and cars are remakes of historical models.

The Britzer Garten belongs to the Grün Berlin Park und Garten GmbH company, which is owned by the city of Berlin. Other places of attraction run by this company are the Britzer Mühle, the Erholungspark Marzahn (opened as the "Berliner Gartenschau" 1987) and the Natur-Park Schöneberger Südgelände (a former EXPO 2000-project).

Britzer Garten

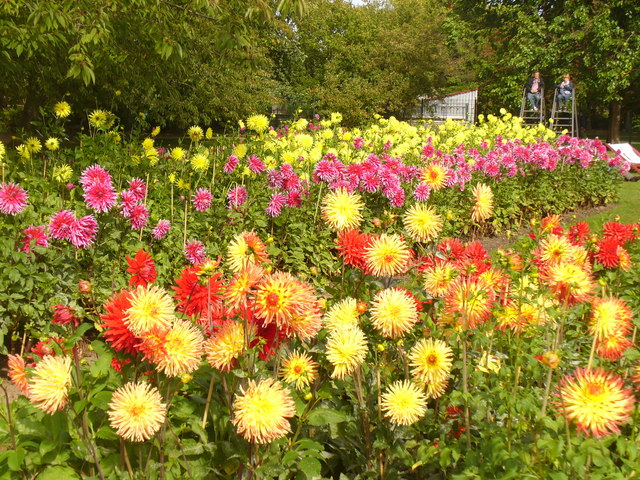

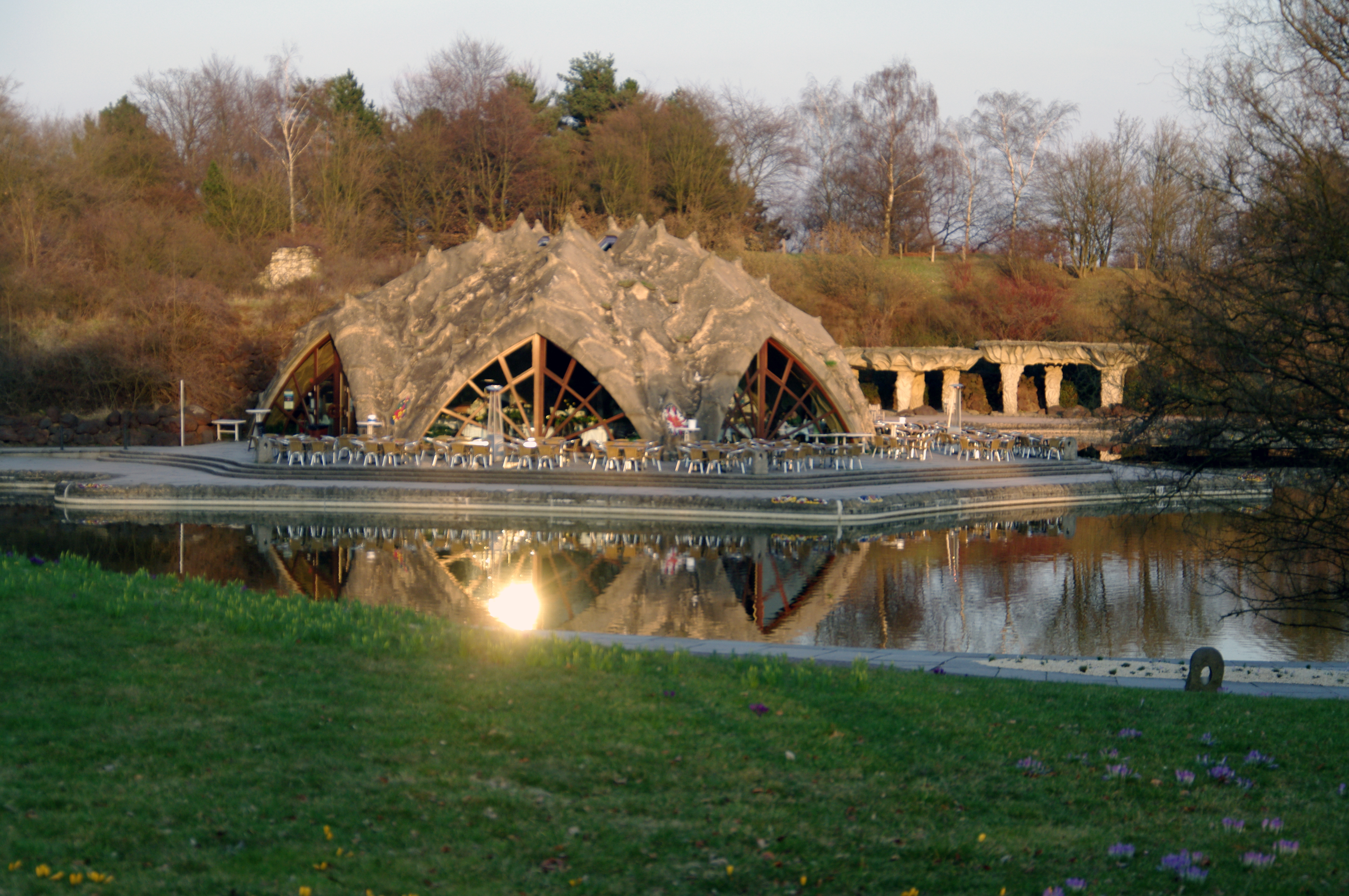

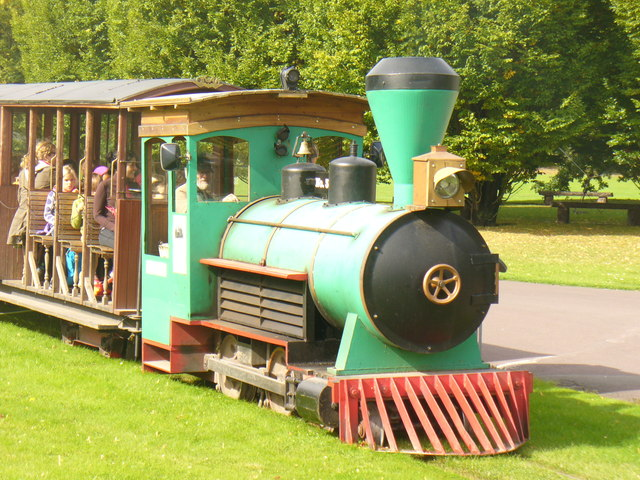

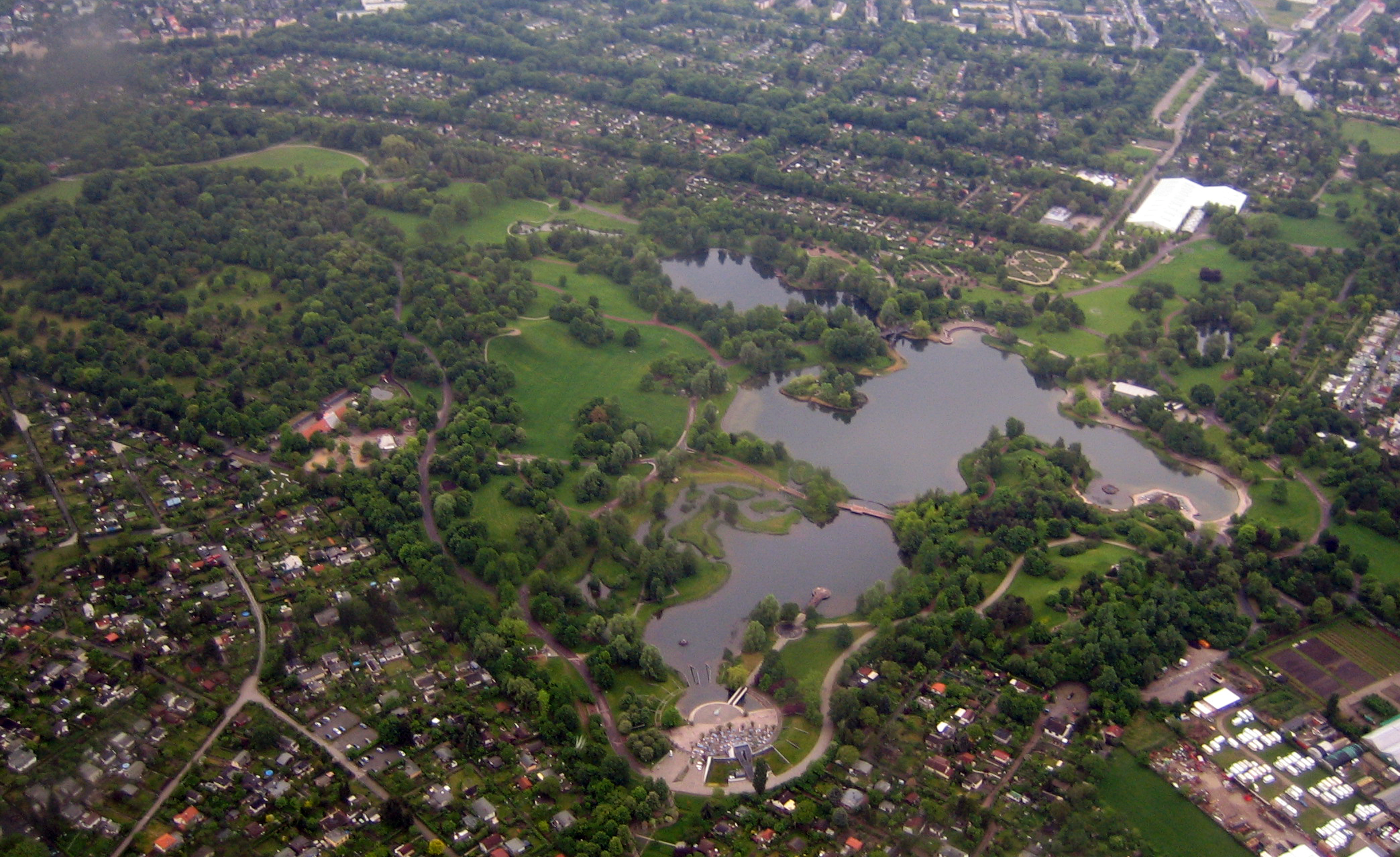

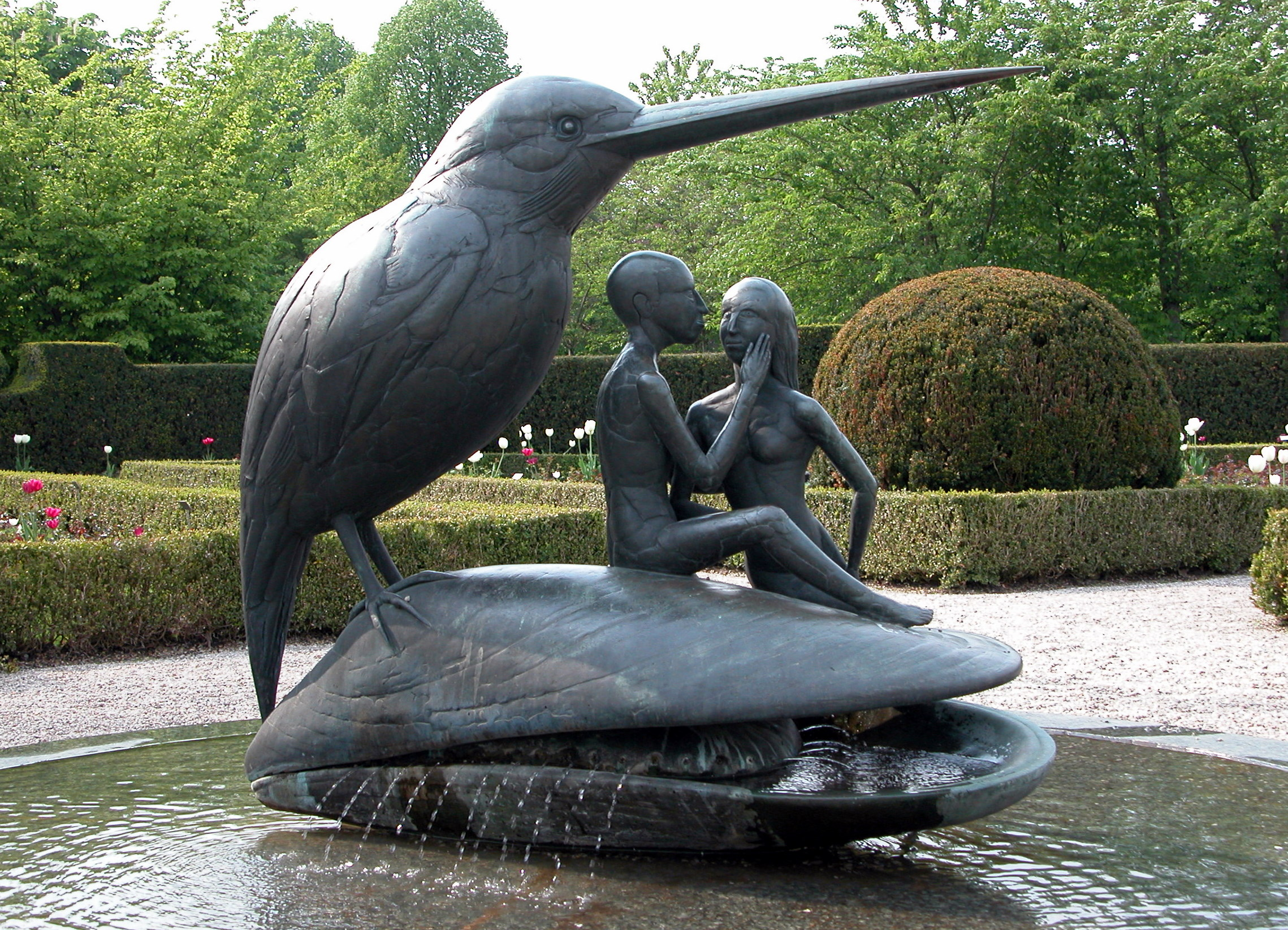

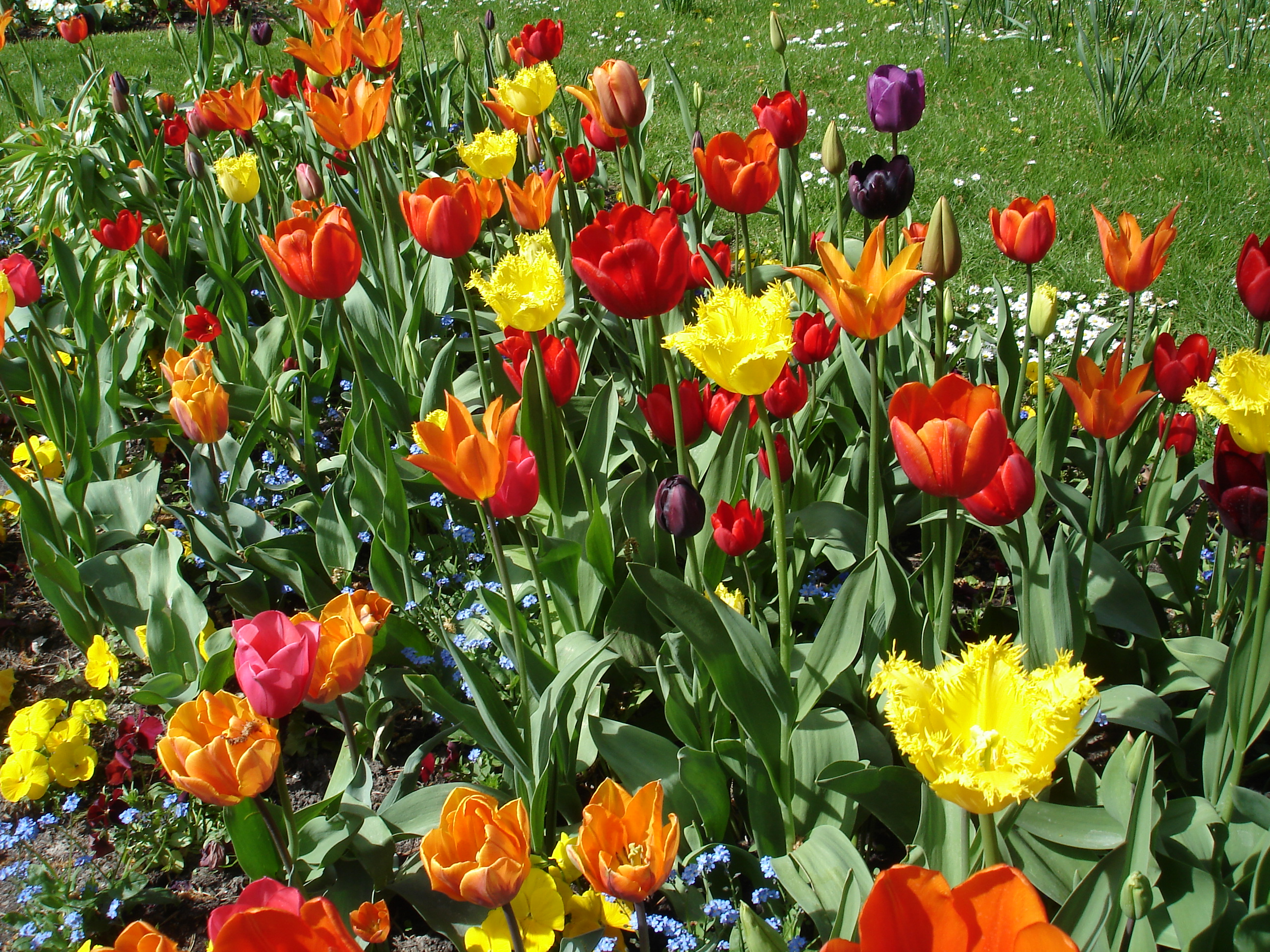

== Bibliography ==
- Clemens Alexander Wimmer: Parks und Gärten in Berlin und Potsdam; ed. Senator für Stadtentwicklung und Umweltschutz, Abt. III – Gartendenkmalpflege; Nicolaische Verlagsbuchhandlung: 3. Aufl. Berlin 1989; ISBN 3-87584-267-7; S. 84-91.
