= Theodor Wolff Park =

Park in Kreuzberg, Berlin, Germany

- Theodor-Wolff-Park
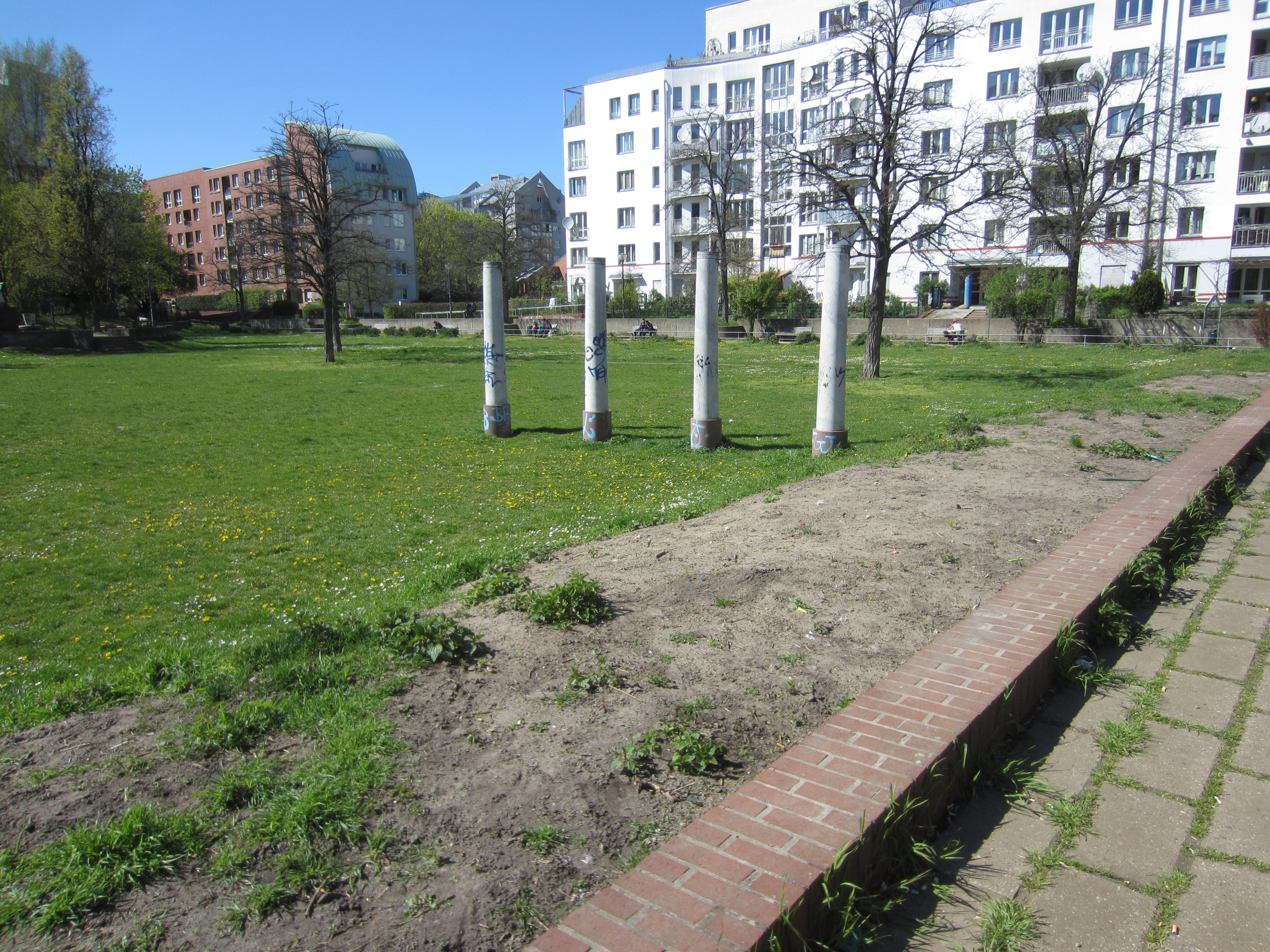
- Part of the park in 2016
- Interactive map of Theodor Wolff Park
- Location: Berlin, Germany
- Coordinates: 52°30′05″N 13°23′24″E

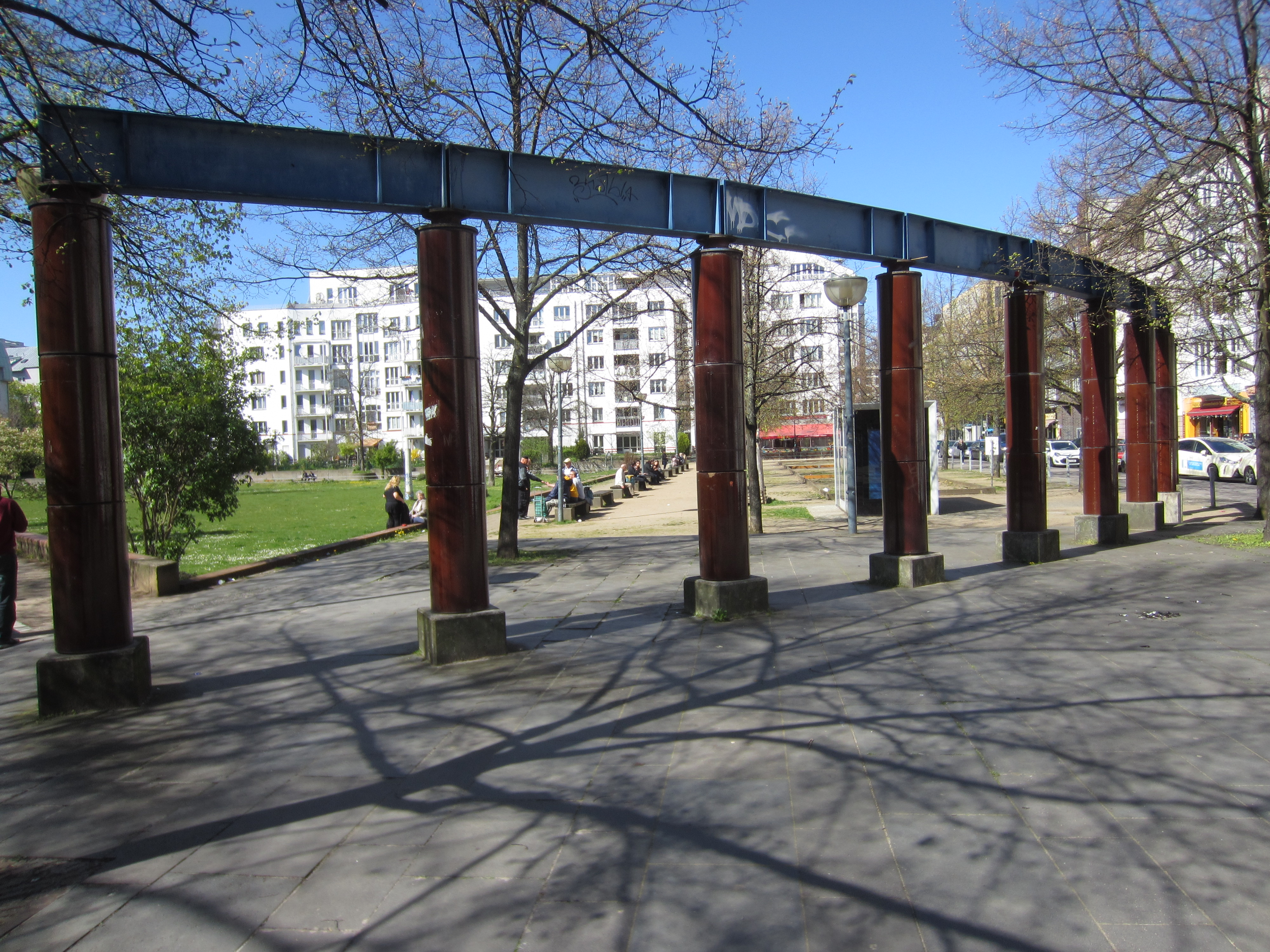
2016

Theodor Wolff Park (German: Theodor-Wolff-Park) is a public park in Kreuzberg, Berlin, Germany.

== See also ==
- List of parks and gardens in Berlin
