= Henriette Herz Park =

Park in Berlin, Germany

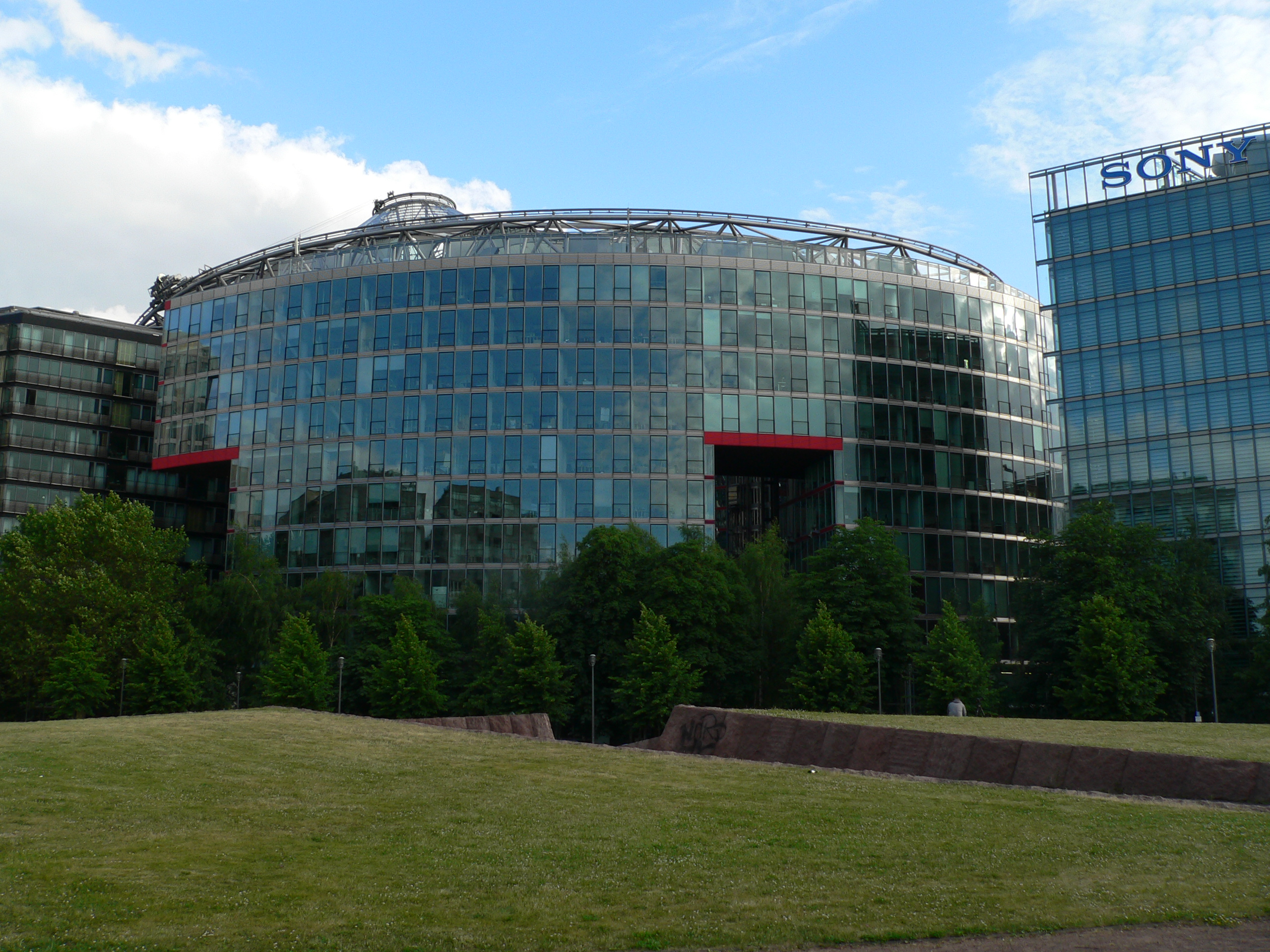
- The park in 2010
- Interactive map of Henriette Herz Park
- Coordinates: 52.5110°N 13.3734°E

Henriette Herz Park (German: Henriette-Herz-Park) is a 1 hectare park near Potsdamer Platz in the Tiergarten district in Berlin, Germany. This park was planned by Shlomo Koren, and was created in 2002. It was named after the Berlin writer Henriette Herz. It has a triangular shape, and is divided into four parts, which slope upwards towards the center. These slopes are bordered with red Finnish granite.

== See also ==
- List of parks and gardens in Berlin
