= Volkspark Mariendorf =

Urban park in Berlin, Germany

Coordinates: 52°26′37″N 13°23′43″E

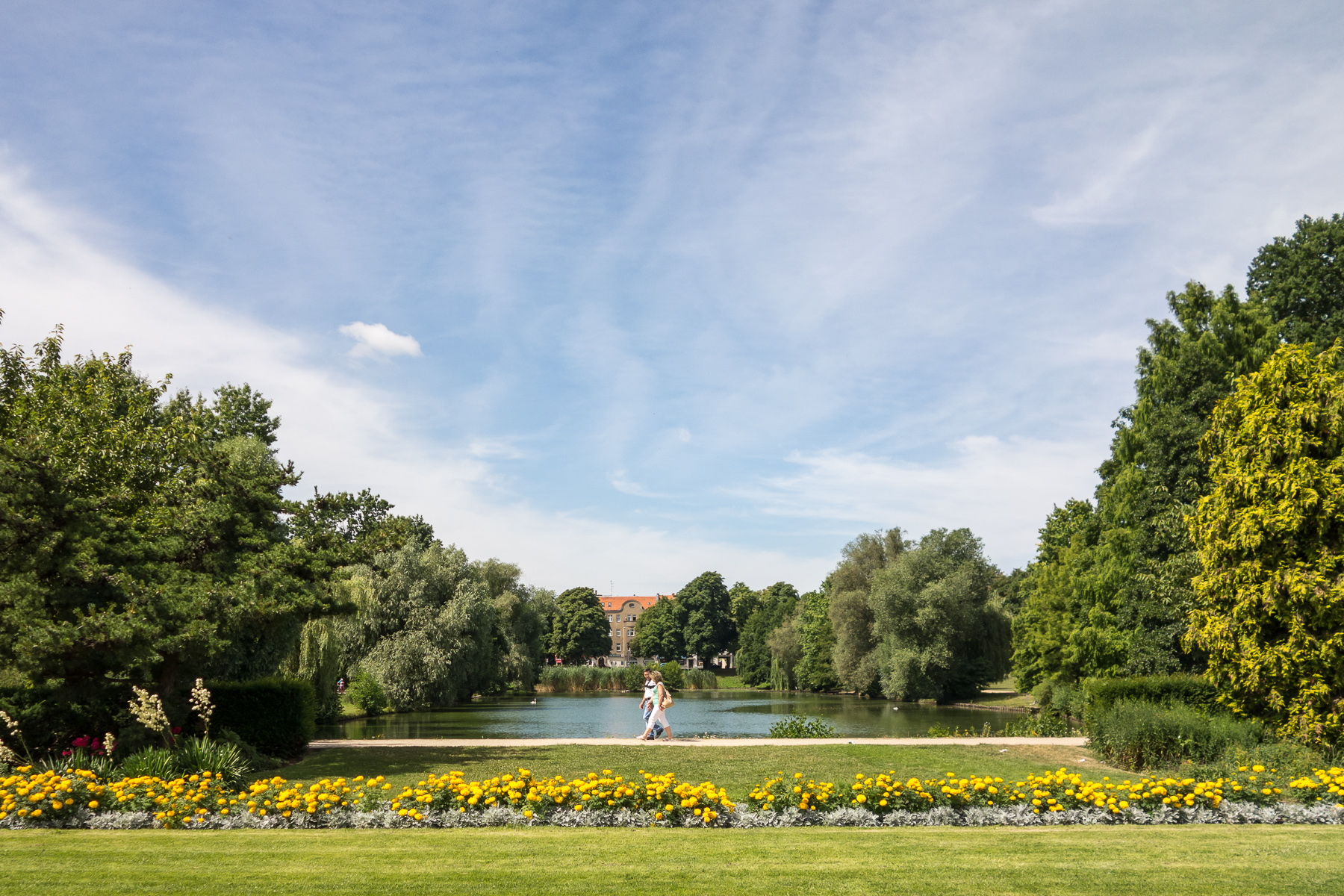
- View to Mariendorfer Damm over the Blümelteich in Volkspark Mariendorf
- Interactive map of Volkspark Mariendorf
- Location: Berlin, Germany
- Open: 1924

The Volkspark Mariendorf is a park located in the Mariendorf part of Berlin's borough Tempelhof-Schöneberg, and was built between 1923 and 1935. It covers approximately 13 hectares. The landscape architect was Ernst A. Harrich.

== Overview ==
There is a small hill, a well with bronze child figures and three lakes (Eckernpfuhl, Bluehmelteich, Karpfenpfuhl). In summer there is a rose garden. The "Volksparkstadion Berlin" (capacity 10,000 spectators), mainly used for soccer matches, is the seventh-largest stadium in Berlin, home to the "Mariendorfer Sportverein 06". In the vicinity there is also a hockey ground and a public swimming pool.

An annual attraction in the park is the "Internationaler Kulturlustgarten" around the Feast of the Ascension, featuring numerous cultural events, which attract thousands of visitors from all over Berlin and from the surrounding countryside. Also held yearly in the Volksparkstadion is the "Rocktreff", Berlin's largest amateur rock competition in Berlin.
