= Mariendorf =

- Quarter of Berlin
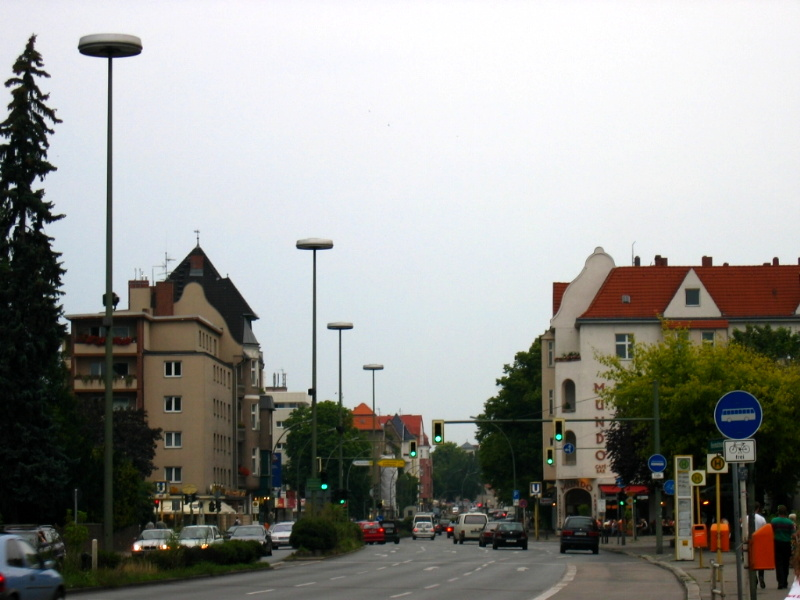
- Mariendorfer Damm

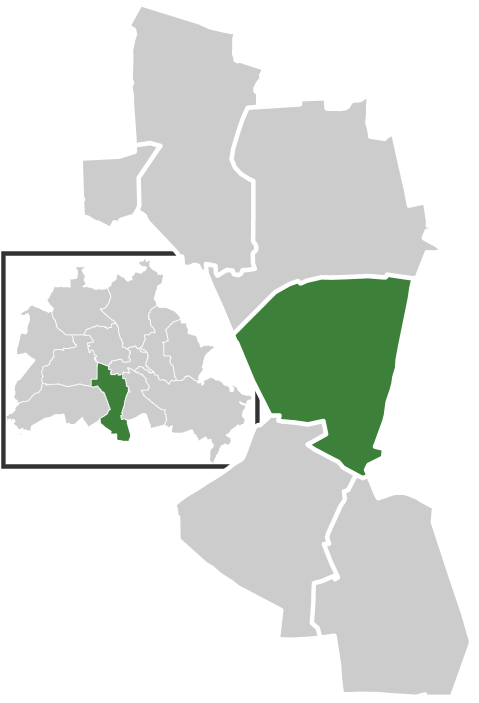
- Location of Mariendorf in Tempelhof-Schöneberg and Berlin
- Interactive map of Mariendorf
- Location within Germany Location within Berlin
- Coordinates: 52°26′00″N 13°22′00″E
- Country: Germany
- State: Berlin
- City: Berlin
- Borough: Tempelhof-Schöneberg
- Founded: 1107

Area
  - Total: 9.38 km^{2} (3.62 sq mi)
- Elevation: 40 m (130 ft)

Population (2024-12-31)
  - Total: 53,758
  - Density: 5,730/km^{2} (14,800/sq mi)
- Time zone: UTC+01:00 (CET)
  - Summer (DST): UTC+02:00 (CEST)
- Postal codes: 12105, 12107, 12109
- Vehicle registration: B

Mariendorf (German: [maˈʁiːəndɔʁf]) is a locality in the southern Tempelhof-Schöneberg borough of Berlin.

== Geography ==
Mariendorf is situated between the localities of Tempelhof in the north and Marienfelde and Lichtenrade in the south. To the west it shares a border with the Lankwitz locality of Steglitz-Zehlendorf, to the east with Britz and Buckow, parts of the borough of Neukölln.

== History ==
Mariendorf was mentioned for the first time in a document of 1348, when it was held by the Bailiwick of Brandenburg of the Order of Saint John (the Johanniterorden). The Johanniter sold Mariendorf, together with Tempelhof and Marienfelde, to the city of Berlin and Coelln in 1435. In 1800, Mariendorf had 162 inhabitants.

Beginning in 1872, a Villenkolonie ("mansion colony") was developed in the south end of Mariendorf, and by 1900 the village had 5,764 inhabitants. The Trabrennbahn (harness racing track) opened in 1913, and in 1920 Mariendorf became formally amalgamated into the greater city of Berlin. The Volkspark Mariendorf was developed in 1924.

At the end of Second World War, Mariendorf became a part of the American zone of occupation. In 1946, Mariendorf's Eisenacher Straße was the site of a displaced persons´ camp which housed roughly 3,250 persons until 1948.

In 1966, an U-Bahn underground station was constructed to serve the district on line U6.

== Main sights ==
- Trabrennbahn
- Monopoly-routes settlement
- Volkspark Mariendorf
- Adlermühle windmill from 1889
- Local history Tempelhof Museum
- Grave of Ulrike Meinhof, militant of the Red Army Fraction at the Dreifaltigkeit cemetery
- Village church from the 13th century

== Transportation ==
Mariendorf is served by the U-Bahn stations Westphalweg and Alt-Mariendorf, the southern terminus of the U6 line. S-Bahn train service by the S2 line is available at the station Attilastraße.

== People ==
- Mario Barth (born 1972), comedian
- Werner Eberlein (1919–2002), SED politician
- Fritz Kühn (1910-1967), visual artist
- Hans-Jürgen Papier (born 1942), judge
