= Klaus Zillich =

German architect (1942–2026)

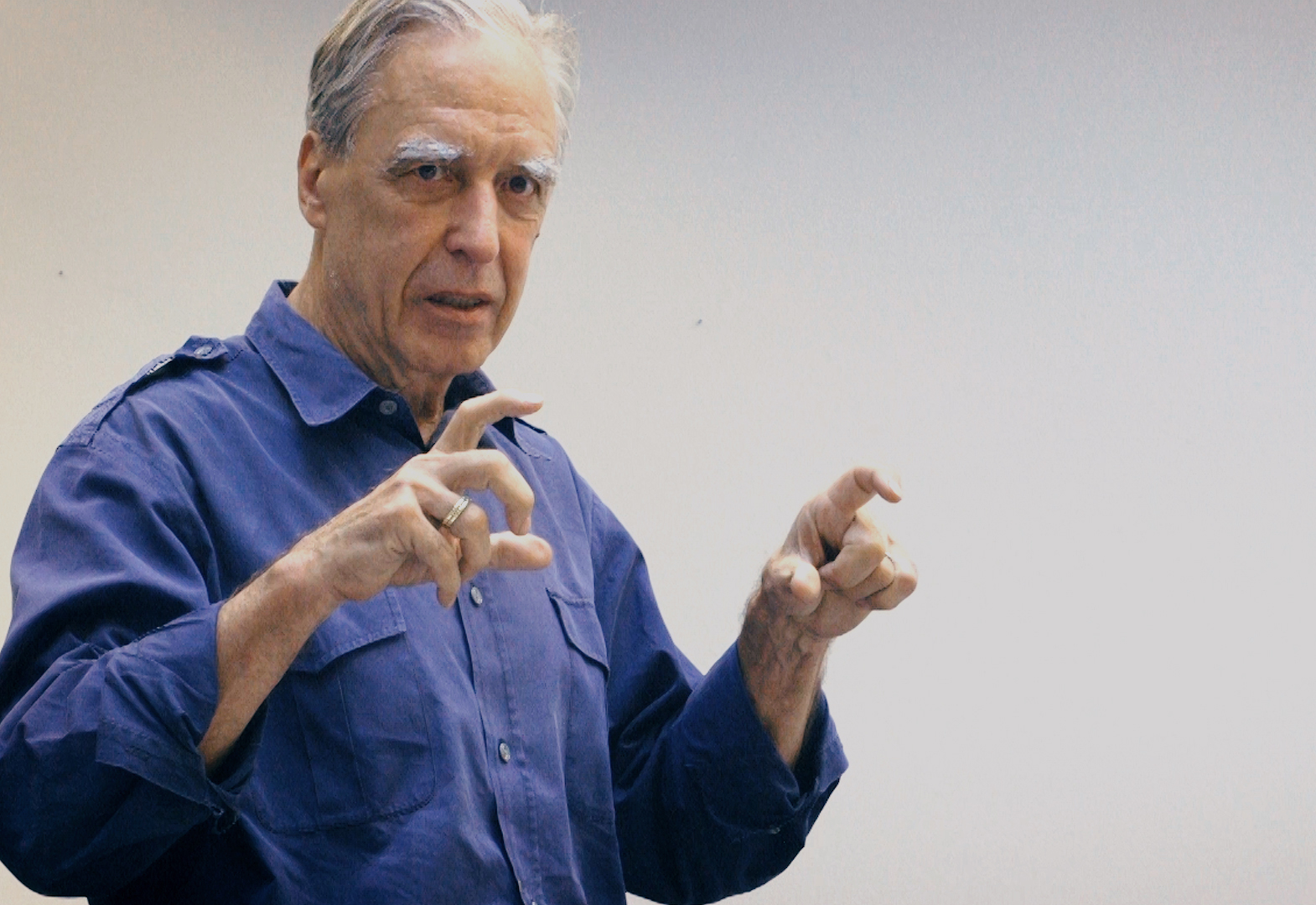
Zillich in 2018

Klaus Zillich (16 December 1942 – 14 January 2026) was a German architect, landscape architect, urban planner and academic.

== Life and career ==
Kluas Zillich was born in Halle, Germany on 16 December 1942. He studied architecture in Hanover from 1960 to 1965 and then with Candilis-Josic-Woods in Paris. At the end of the 1960s he completed his studies at Technische Universität Berlin with Oswald Mathias Ungers.

With his office partner Jasper Halfmann and later Wolfgang Engel, Zillich created buildings of various scales - from kindergartens to large housing developments in the south of Berlin. His work came about a. in the context of the Berlin urban renewal discourse, partly also the International Building Exhibition 1987. The buildings are often characterized by strong expressiveness and are always to be read as an answer to the specific context of a place. In many buildings, climatic and ecological considerations also shape the design.

At TU Berlin he headed the department of design, urban district planning and urban renewal.

Zillich died on 14 January 2026, at the age of 83.

== Buildings ==
- Open space planning: residential complex Ritterstraße-Nord, Alte Jakobstraße / Feilnerstraße / Lindenstraße / Oranienstraße / Ritterstraße, 1983, with Jasper Halfmann
- Cosmological Park, Britzer Garten Berlin, 1985, with Jasper Halfmann and Jürgen Zilling
- Day care center, Lindauer Allee, Berlin, 1989
- Stresemann Mews, Block 19, Wilhelmstrasse 131 / 136–139, Stresemannstrasse 38 / 42–46, 1990, with Jasper Halfmann
- Day care center in the Stadthausquartier, Lützowstraße 40–42, 1992, with Jasper Halfmann
- Park settlement Spruch, Berlin-Neukölln, 1996, with Jasper Halfmann

== Publications ==
Jasper Halfmann, Clod Zillich: Projects 76–82. Aedes Gallery for Architecture and Space, Berlin 1982. Jasper Halfmann, Klaus Zillich: Daycare Center Lützowstrasse, Berlin Tiergarten. Aedes Gallery for Architecture and Space, Berlin 1993.

== Literature ==
- Lukas Fink, Tobias Fink, Ruben Bernegger: Berlin portraits - narratives on the architecture of the city . Verlag der Buchhandlung Walther König, Cologne 2019. ISBN 978-3-96098-654-6
- Jasper Halfmann, Klaus Zillich, Coop Himmelblau, Hinrich Baller, Inken Baller, Peter Cook : Die Aufmüpfigen. AA Files No. 9, pp. 65–82, Architectural Association School of Architecture, London 1985
- K. Zillich, J. Halfmann, H. Kollhoff, B. Tonon, PL Wilson, B. Podrecca, JL Mateo, F. Neumeyer, M. Meili, F. Venezia: Berlin Summer Academy of Architecture, Bundesallee projects, A + U, Edition: 11/1988, 218, pp. 31–74
