= Körnerpark =

Park in Berlin, Germany

Coordinates: 52°28′19″N 13°26′16″E

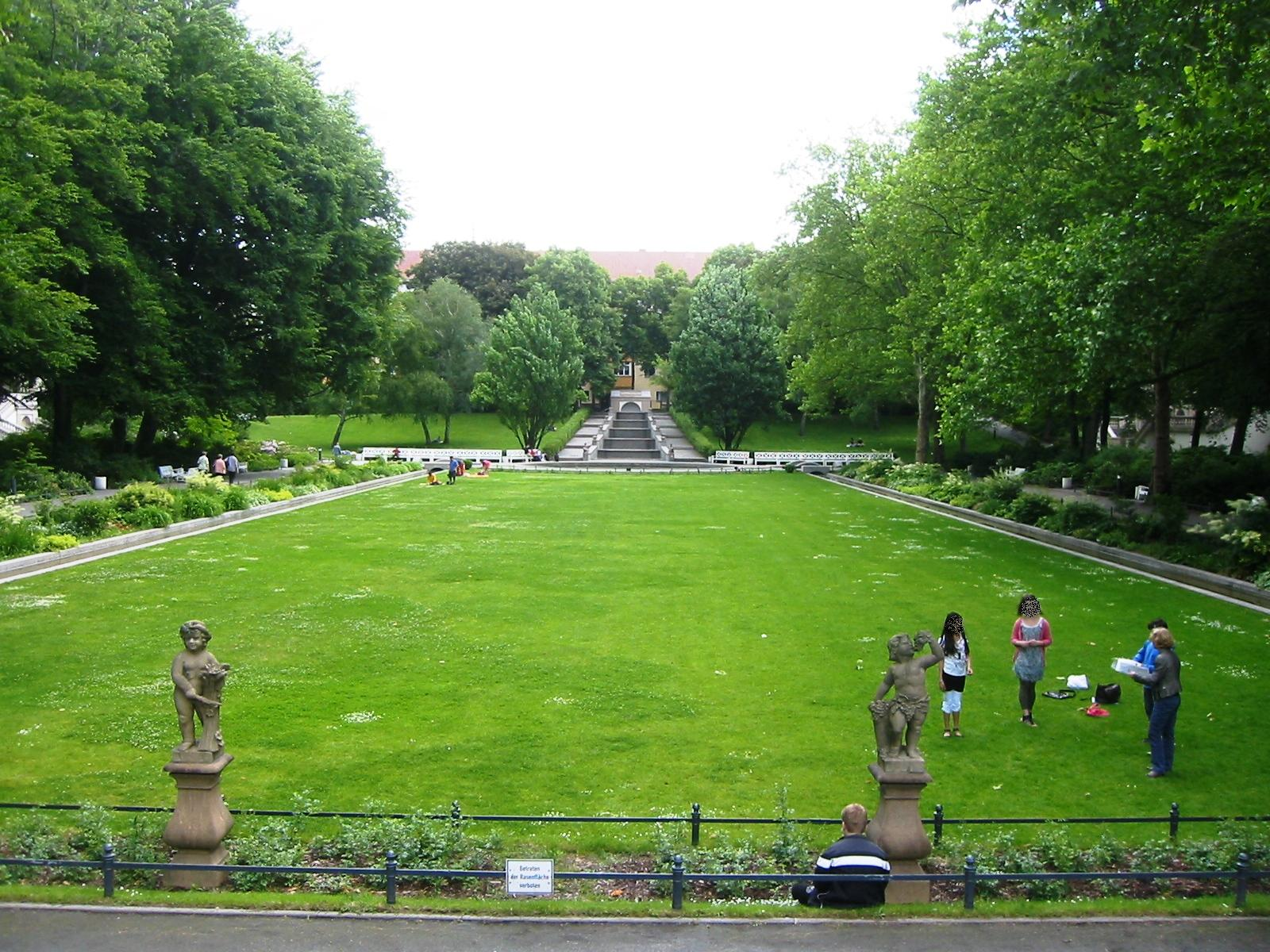
View from the orangery with cascade in the background

The Körnerpark (German pronunciation: [ˈkœʁnɐˌpaʁk]) is situated in Berlin's quarter of Neukölln in the Neukölln borough between Jonasstraße, Schierker Straße, Selkestraße and Wittmannsdorfer Straße. The approximately 2.4 hectare (5.93 acres) park resembles a palace garden. The feature in the eastern part of the park is a cascade with fountains. Opposite to the west, an orangery houses a café and a gallery for temporary exhibitions, and forms the boundary of the park. During summer weekends, the forecourt of the orangery is used for free concerts and performances. The northern part is dominated by a flower garden. Körnerpark, one of the official neighborhoods in the quarter of Neukölln, derives its name from the park.

== Development ==
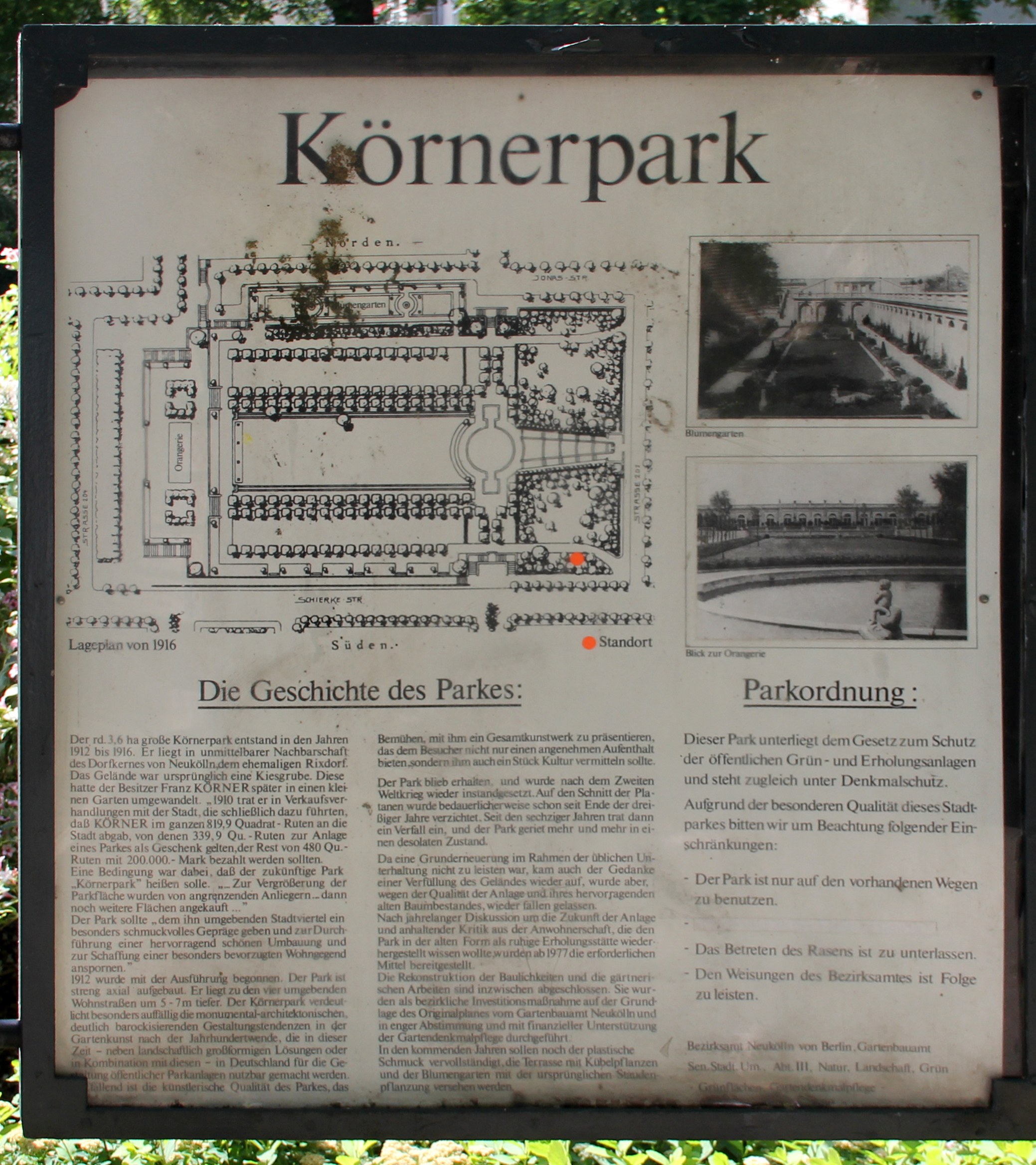
Commemorative plaque, Wittmannsdorfer Straße 6

The park was built in a former gravel pit, which its owner Franz Körner gifted to the former city of Rixdorf in 1910 under the condition that the planned park would carry his name. Probably designed by Hans Richard Küllenberg, the park was built between 1912 and 1916 in a Neo-baroque style. The city fathers intended to provide the surrounding neighbourhood with an adorned landmark, encouraging the development of excellent and beautiful buildings, to create an exceptionally preferred residential area.

Due to its original use as gravel pit, the park's level is between five and seven meters below the surrounding street level. Retaining walls border the park on three sides. Attached to the western wall is the orangery, styled after the gardens of Versailles by its architect Reinhold Kiehl. Along with the Märchenbrunnen in the Volkspark Friedrichshain and the cascade at the Lietzensee, a lake near Alt-Lietzow in Charlottenburg, the Körnerpark is an outstanding example of Neo-baroque garden design in Berlin.

== Restoration ==
The park fell into disrepair after World War II, and its location beneath the eastern approach path of Berlin Tempelhof Airport exarcerbated its deterioration. The park's restoration began at the end of the 1970s, based on the preserved original designs. In October 1983, the orangery reopened as a gallery, and the cascade and canals were renovated in 2002. Buckets with plants stand again on the forecourt of the orangery, and the extensive areas of herbaceous plants have been restored.

The Körnerpark has been listed as one of Neukölln's historic garden monuments since 2 April 2004.

== Equestrian tomb of Neukölln ==
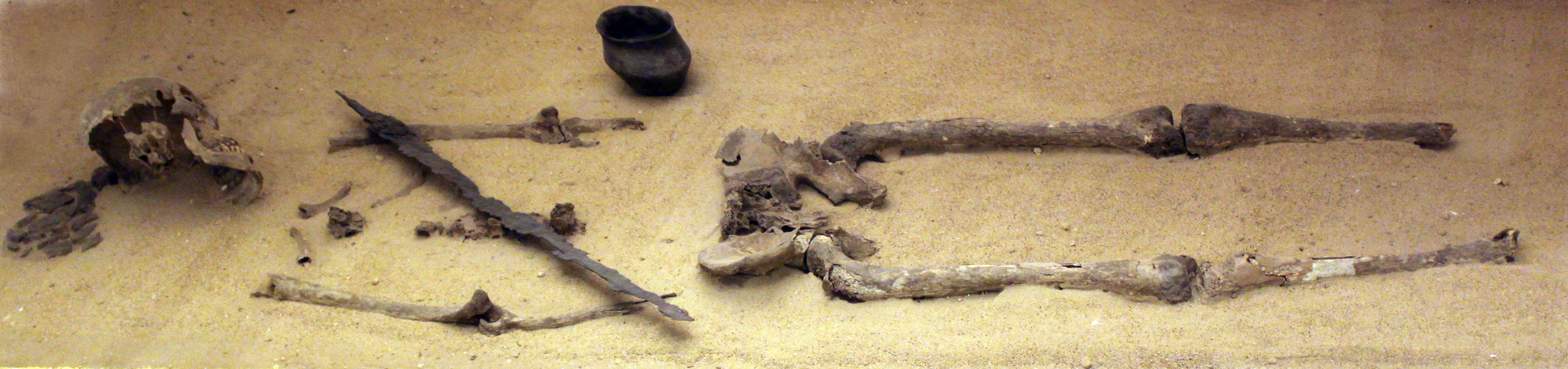
Equestrian tomb of Neukölln

The site received archaeological fame, when on 23 January 1912, during construction work at the corner Jonas-/Selkestraße, the Equestrian tomb of Neukölln was discovered. The tomb dates from the late Germanic Migration Period in the early 6th century. Today, it is on display in the Märkisches Museum.

The equestrian was buried with his horse in a tomb of 2.50 metres depth. He had been approximately 40 years of age at the time of his death. The grave also contained the remains of a leather belt, fitted with iron parts, bronze nails and an earthenware vessel. A spatha, a long sword, lay diagonally on the corpse.

== Bibliography ==
- Clemens Alexander Wimmer: Parks und Gärten in Berlin und Potsdam; ed. Senator für Stadtentwicklung und Umweltschutz, Abt. III – Gartendenkmalpflege; Nicolaische Verlagsbuchhandlung: 3rd edition, Berlin 1989, ISBN 3-87584-267-7, p. 80–82.
- Adrian von Müller: Berlins Urgeschichte. Bruno Hessling Verlag, Berlin 1971, ISBN 3-7769-0111-X, S. 58.
- Sabine Huth, Cordula Rinsche: Schlösser, Parks & Gärten in Berlin und Brandenburg. FAB Verlag, Berlin 1997, ISBN 3-927551-40-6, p. 226.
- Senatsverwaltung für Stadtentwicklung und Umwelt: Stadtgrün in Berlin – Urban Green Spaces in Berlin. booklet, Berlin 2012, p. 29. (German/English)
