= Natur-Park Südgelände =

Park in Berlin, Germany

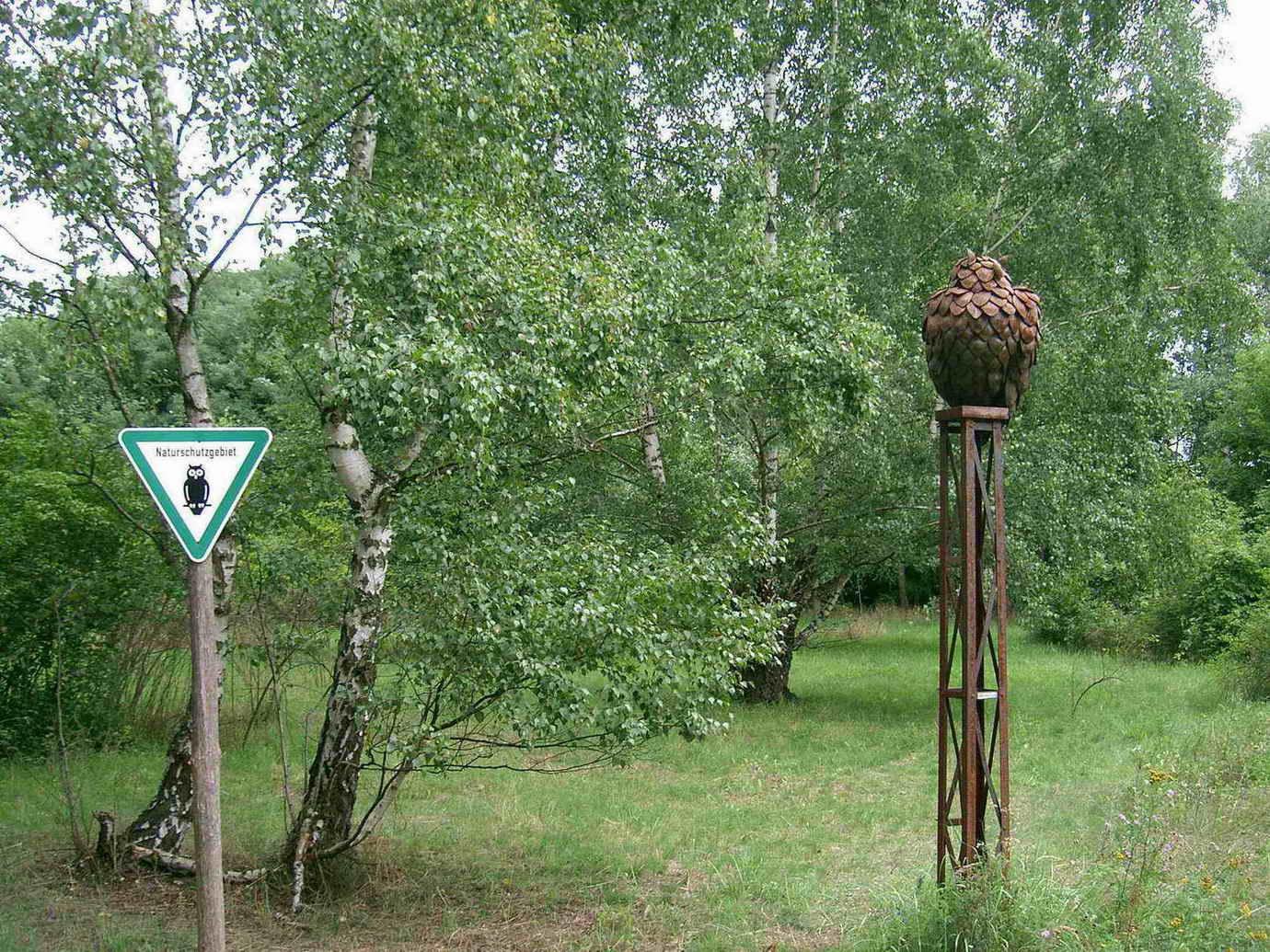
- Natur-Park Südgelände with an owl sculpture visible
- Interactive map of Natur-Park Südgelände
- Location: Schöneberg, Tempelhof-Schöneberg, Berlin
- Coordinates: 52.463°N 13.359°E
- Area: 18 hectares (44 acres)
- Created: 1999
- Operator: Grün Berlin

Natur-Park Südgelände is a public park located in the Schöneberg district in the Berlin borough of Tempelhof-Schöneberg. The 18 hectare park is located on the former Tempelhof railway yard. The park is known for its mix of wild nature, decaying railway facilities and art.

== History ==
In 1889 the Tempelhof marshalling yard was built on the site and extended several times until the 1930s. A Bahnbetriebswerk was constructed in 1931. After the closure of the Berlin Anhalter Bahnhof in 1952 the western section of the marshalling yard was closed. Nature began reclaiming the disused yard and lines. However, the eastern half of the yard remained in use for limited shunting operation with the Bahnbetriebswerk continuing to be used by Deutsche Reichsbahn. During the late 1970s construction of a new freight station on the site was proposed; however these proposals met community resistance and were finally abandoned in 1989. In 1995 Deutsche Bahn donated the site to the Berlin city government as compensation for other environmental impacts caused by the company. The state-owned Grün Berlin was responsible for the expansion, and received financial assistance from the Allianz Umweltstiftung (Allianz Environmental Foundation).

The park was officially opened in 1999 and was a project of the Expo 2000.

== Flora and fauna ==
The park is known as the habitat for a large number of plant, animal and insect species, many endangered. Much of the park contains Ruderal species. The park contains 366 different species of ferns and Spermatophytes, 49 mushroom species, 49 species of birds, 14 grasshopper and cricket species, 57 spider species and 95 bee species, of which more than 60 are endangered.

== Art and derelict railway facilities ==
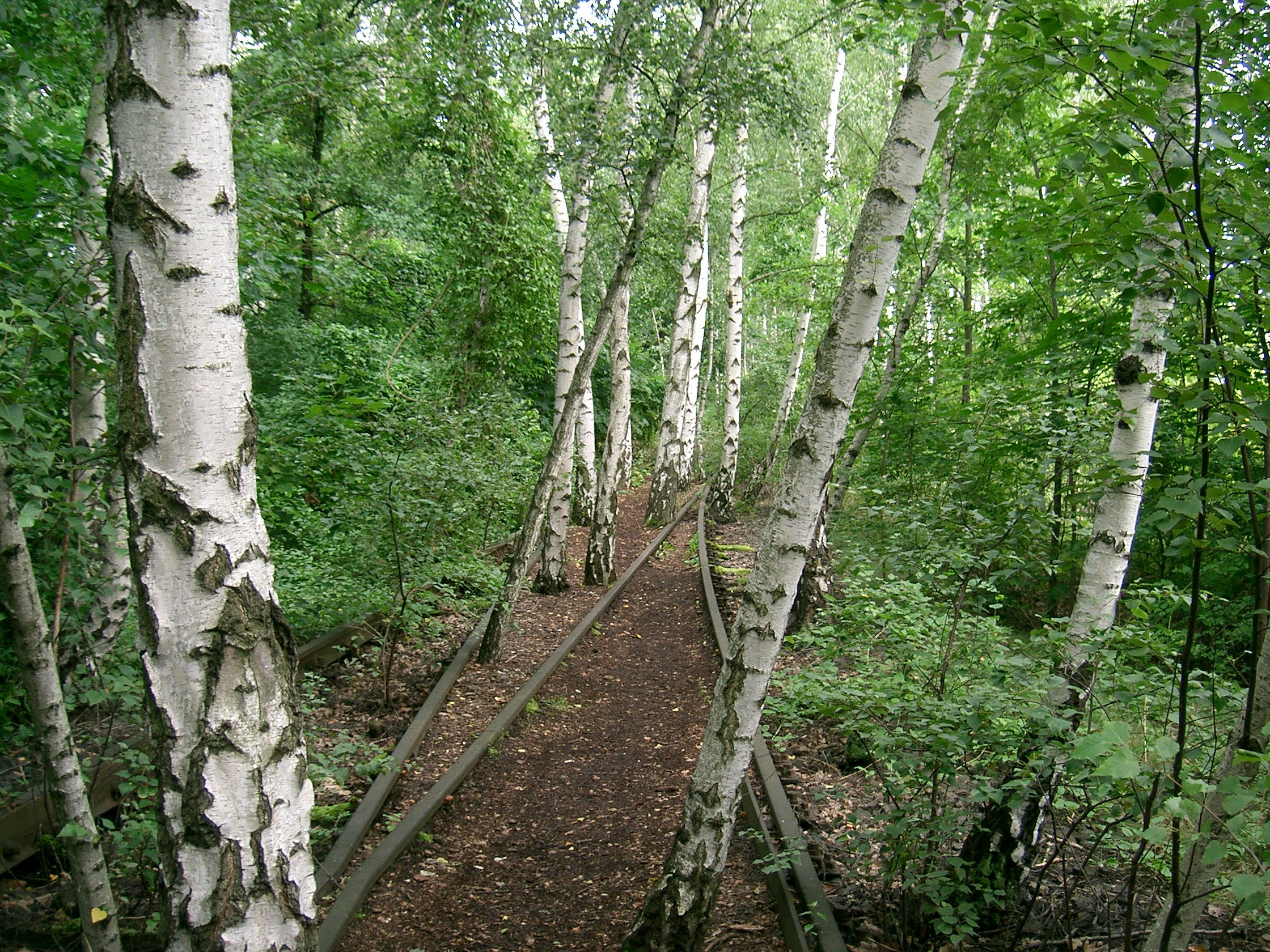
Former railway line

Much of the former railway infrastructure remains on the site. A 1940 DRB Class 50 Steam locomotive and a turntable are reminders of the former Bahnbetriebswerk, while in the south-western area of the park remains two large flying junctions (Überwerfungsbauwerk). A 50-metre-tall water tower dating from 1927 remains, as does a large locomotive hall which is often used for events, such as theatre, dance and performance events, including those of the Berliner Festspiele.

Numerous art installations and sculptures from the artist group Odious are present throughout the park. These installations were described as a "distinctive element of the park" in the 2014 Springer Science+Business Media book Nature Policies and Landscape Policies: Towards an Alliance.
