= Neukölln (locality) =

Quarter of the Neukölln borough in Berlin, Germany

- Quarter of Berlin
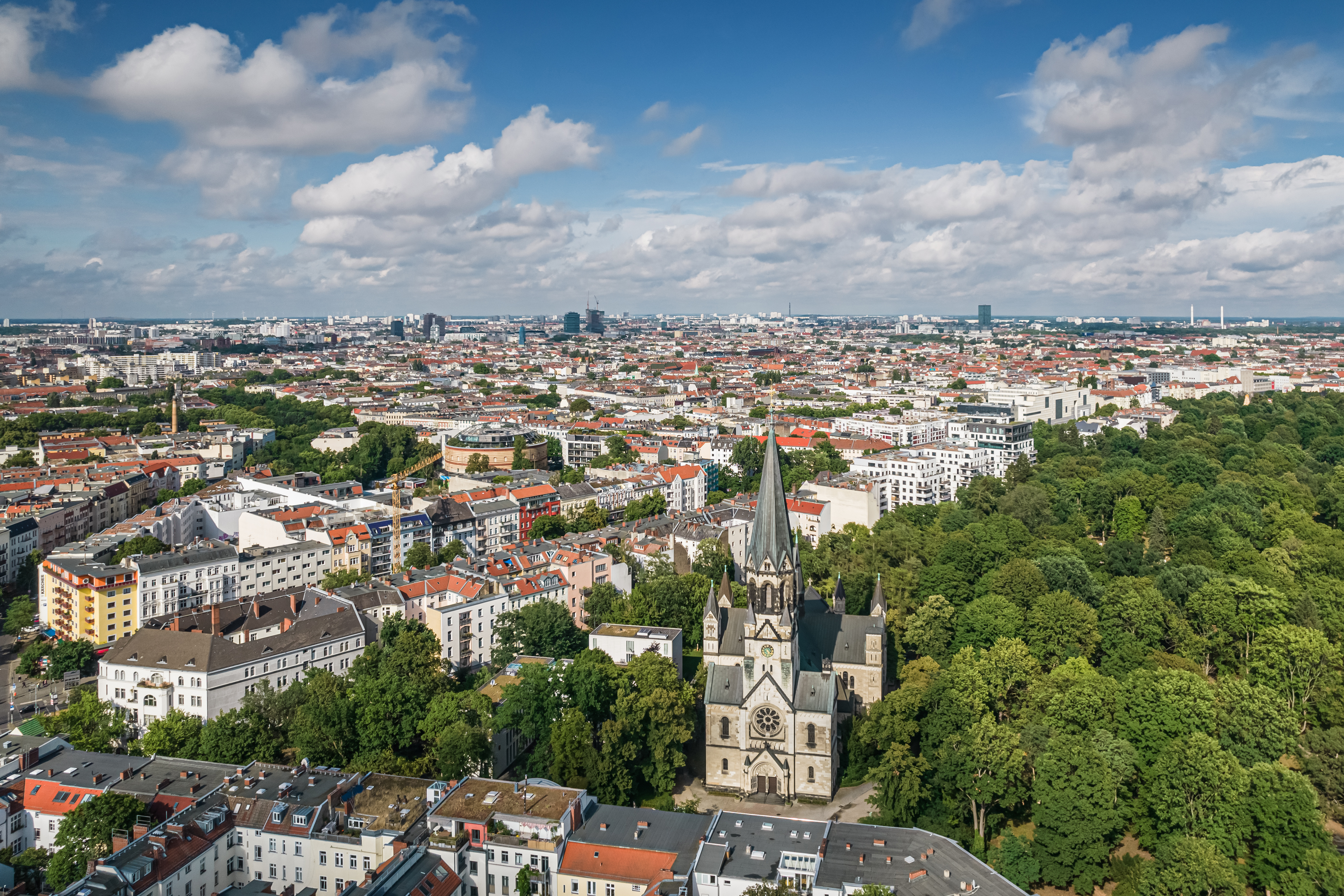
- Hasenheide on the western outskirts of Neukölln with St. John's Basilica

- Flag Coat of arms

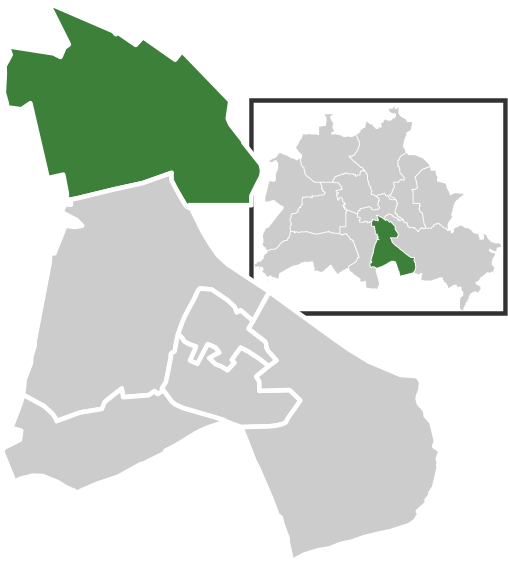
- Location of Neukölln in Neukölln borough and Berlin
- Interactive map of Neukölln
- Location within Germany Location within Berlin
- Coordinates: 52°28′39.3″N 13°26′31.5″E
- Country: Germany
- State: Berlin
- City: Berlin
- Borough: Neukölln
- Founded: 26 June 1360 (official), 1190–1210 (unofficial)
- Subdivisions: 9 neighborhoods or 5 regions with 21 planning areas

Government
  - Mayor: Martin Hikel (SPD)

Area
  - Total: 11.7 km^{2} (4.5 sq mi)
- Elevation: 43.6 m (143 ft)

Population (2024-12-31)
  - Total: 162,548
  - Density: 13,900/km^{2} (36,000/sq mi)
- Time zone: UTC+01:00 (CET)
  - Summer (DST): UTC+02:00 (CEST)
- Postal codes: 12043, 12045, 12047, 12049, 12051, 12053, 12055, 12057, 12059
- Vehicle registration: B
- Website: https://www.berlin.de/ba-neukoelln/

Neukölln (German: [nɔʏˈkœln]), formerly Rixdorf (German: [rˈɪksdɔɾf]), from 1899 to 1920 an independent city, is a large inner-city quarter of Berlin in the homonymous borough of Neukölln, and evolved around the historic village of Rixdorf. With 163,184 inhabitants (2026) the quarter has the second-largest population of Berlin after Prenzlauer Berg. Since the early 13th century, the local settlements, villages and cities down to the present day have always been a popular destination for colonists and immigrants. In modern times, it was originally shaped by the working class and gastarbeiters, but western immigration since the turn of the millennium has led to gentrification and a rejuvenation of the quarter's culture and nightlife.

== Geography ==
Rixdorfer Höhe, Hasenheide

Neukölln is on the North European Plain, which is typically characterized by low-lying marshy woodlands with a mainly flat topography. The quarter lies on the geological border between the shallow Weichselian Warsaw-Berlin Urstromtal glacial valley and the northernmost edge of the Teltow young drift ground moraine plateau, specifically the Rollberge, (Note: Lit. rollende Berge, i.e. sanft geschwungene Berge ("rolling hills") in the figurative meaning of rollen as fließen ("to flow") or wogen ("to wave"); one of Neukölln's neighborhoods was named after the Rollberge range (see below). See also the Kreuzberg, Berlin's most prominent glacial (and highest natural inner-city) hill which, together with the Rollberge and the slopes near the former Mühlenberg in Schöneberg, forms the larger northern Teltow range called Tempelhofer Berge.) a small range of glacial hills rising to the south of Hermannplatz and the street Hasenheide, and to the west of Rixdorf and the street Karl-Marx-Straße. Neukölln's average natural elevation is 43.6 m (143 ft) above NHN, ranging from 32.3 m (106 ft) to 54.8 m (180 ft), (Note: Neukölln's highest point is on the Teltow in the central Schillerkiez approximately at Schillerpromenade 27/28; the quarter's lowest point is in the glacial valley near the eastern border to Plänterwald along the Heidekampgraben near Kiefholzstraße (Köllnische Heide); cf. i.a. "Geoportal Berlin" s.v. "Karten → Fachkarten → INSPIRE-transformiert → II 01 Höhe → Höhenlage im INSPIRE-Datenmodell (Digitales Geländemodell)", Senatsverwaltung für Stadtentwicklung, Bauen und Wohnen, Berlin.) with the highest man-made elevation at 67.9 m (223 ft) achieved by the Rixdorfer Höhe, a schuttberg in the Volkspark Hasenheide. (Note: The Rixdorfer Höhe has the highest elevation in the southern part of Berlin's inner city within the Ringbahn, surpassed only by a few schuttberg deposits in the north near the Barnim like the 86.5 m (284 ft) Humboldthöhe in the Volkspark Humboldthain (Gesundbrunnen); see also Liste von Erhebungen in Berlin. Neukölln's tallest building structure, on the other hand, is the Estrel Tower at 176 m (577 ft), which is Berlin's tallest skyscraper and Germany's tallest hotel tower; see also List of tallest buildings in Berlin.) Neukölln's geographical center, based on a minimum bounding plane, is located east of Richardstraße 101 near Kirchgasse at a linear distance of approximately 2.3 km (1.4 mi) to the river Spree with an elevation of 34.8 m (114 ft).

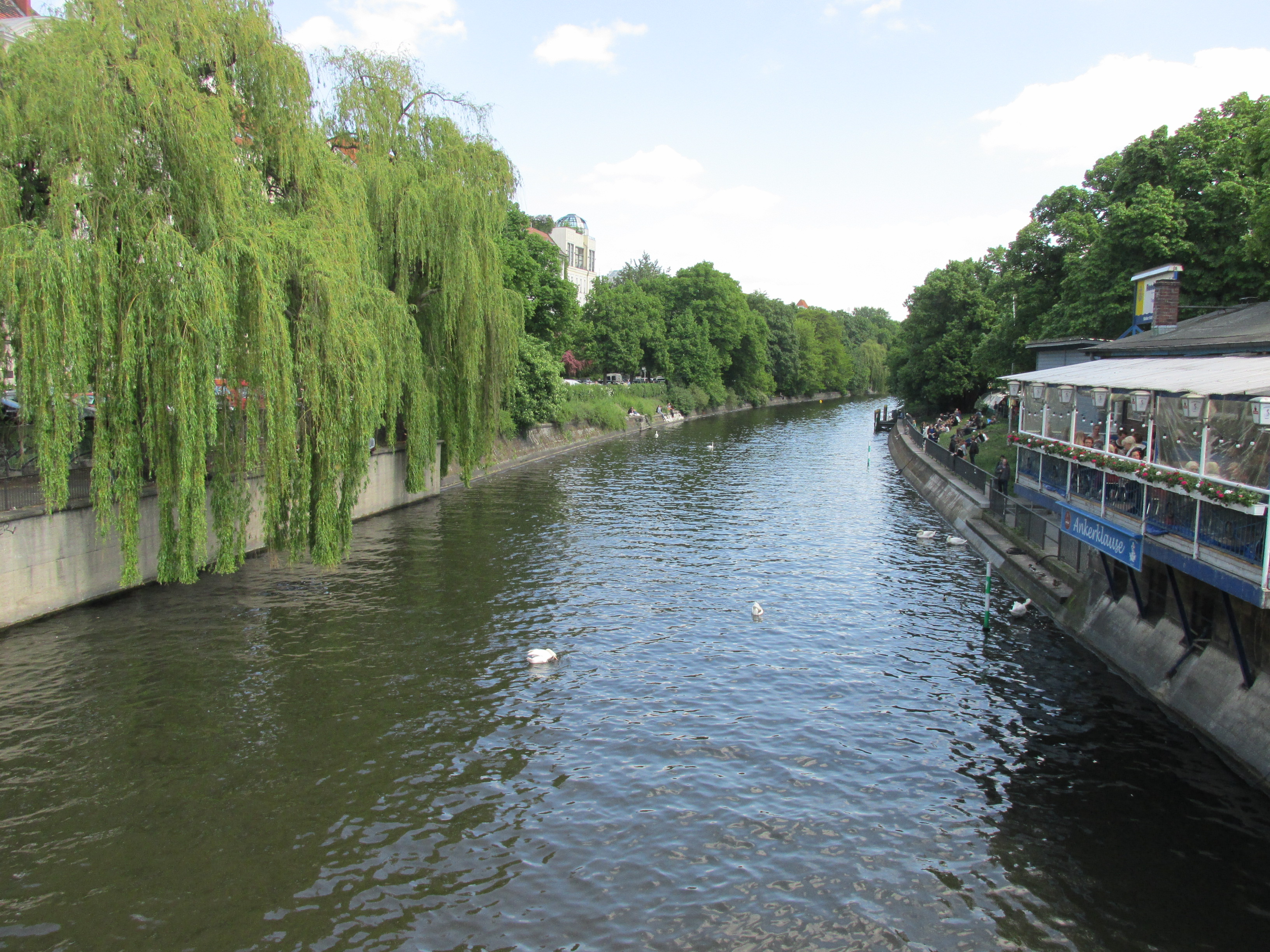
Landwehr Canal with Neukölln and the quayside bar Ankerklause on the right

=== Location ===
Neukölln forms the lower east side of Berlin's city center within the Ringbahn, and is the northernmost quarter in the homonymous borough of Neukölln, with the borough stretching all the way to Berlin's southern border with Brandenburg. The quarter, administratively abbreviated Neukö, is officially an Ortsteil, and the borough a Verwaltungsbezirk (administrative district), in Berlin designated Bezirk (district). (Note: The use of the shortened term Bezirk has legal reasons, because Berlin's boroughs are only partially administrative districts: Berlin is a single municipality (Einheitsgemeinde), so its boroughs have limited power, acting only as agencies of Berlin's state and city governments, as laid out in the 1920 Greater Berlin Act; the boroughs are financially dependent on state donations, as they neither possess any taxation power nor own any property. (This is in contrast to municipalities and counties in other German states, which are territorial corporations, so-called Gebietskörperschaften, with autonomous functions and property.) Furthermore, a borough's district office, while in charge of most administrative matters affecting its borough's residents, can be overruled by the Berlin Senate, which is the agent of Berlin's Hauptverwaltung (central administration); see also Boroughs and quarters of Berlin § Administration and politics.) Different from the borough, the smaller quarter of Neukölln has no mayor or representative assembly of its own. To distinguish the quarter from the borough, the latter is sometimes informally called Groß-Neukölln ("Greater Neukölln"), while the quarter is also called Berlin-Neukölln (Note: Over the years there have been several petitions to reestablish the historical name Rixdorf; Kai Ritzmann, "Aus (Nord-)Neukölln soll wieder Rixdorf werden", 1 July 2019, B.Z..) or Nord-Neukölln. (Note: Other alternative toponyms for the quarter are Neukölln-Nord, Nordneukölln and Neukölln 44. The number 44 had been part of the quarter's old postal code (1000 Berlin 44, Neukölln 1) and is still in informal cultural use after the introduction of the new postal codes in Germany on 1 July 1993. (Neukölln's modern postal codes, which range from 12043 to 12059, therefore still include the local number 44; however, only the codes with odd terminating numbers are currently in use.) Aside from its use to distinguish the quarter from the borough, the old postal code 44 has i.a. become part of local music and youth culture, adopted e.g. by clubs like the venue Hole^{44}, and by native hip hop musicians such as Nashi44, Doni44, 44Grad or Kalazh44.)

In the south, the quarter Neukölln is adjacent to the quarter Britz, which is also part of greater Neukölln, and to Späthsfelde in the quarter Baumschulenweg east of Britz. In the north and north-west, it borders on the quarter Kreuzberg in the Friedrichshain-Kreuzberg borough, namely the southern part of the historical Luisenstadt district in the SO 36 neighborhood, and the Graefekiez and Bergmannkiez in the Kreuzberg 61 neighborhood, which were once part of the historical Tempelhofer Vorstadt district. Neukölln's northernmost tip is also adjacent to Kreuzberg's neighborhood Wassertorplatz in the southern part of the historical Friedrichstadt district. In the west and south-west, Neukölln borders on the quarter Tempelhof in the Tempelhof-Schöneberg borough. In the north-east to south-east, Neukölln borders on the quarters Alt-Treptow, Plänterwald and western Baumschulenweg, which, together with Späthsfelde, are all part of the Treptow-Köpenick borough in former East Berlin.

Neukölln is separated from Kreuzberg by the park Volkspark Hasenheide, the Landwehr Canal, and the streets Kottbusser Damm and Hasenheide as far as the city square Südstern, which conforms to Berlin's historical Weichbildgrenze (1861–1919). With Tempelhof, Neukölln shares the Tempelhofer Feld, the vast field of the former Tempelhof Airport, now a popular recreation area. The Britz Canal, the green corridor Heidekamppark with the trench Heidekampgraben, the Kiefholzstraße and several urban streets in the Harzer Kiez separate Neukölln from the quarters of Treptow-Köpenick in former East Berlin. Finally, the Stadtring motorway with the Carl-Weder-Park, streets like Britzkestraße, Juliushof and Grenzallee, as well as the southern end of the Neukölln Ship Canal, form the administrative border with the Britz quarter.

The Teltow Canal, on the other hand, forms the geographical and demographic border within the borough Neukölln. The canal separates the dense urban areas of Neukölln and northern Britz with their higher share of immigrants and lower-income citizenry from the borough's southern residential areas, which, with the exception of Gropiusstadt, are mainly characterized by a larger number of family homes and middle-class households. (Note: The continuing growth of Neukölln's urbanized and gentrified sphere, however, is slowly expanding the northern demographics southward, for example into Britz' neighborhood Hufeisensiedlung, or into the Buschkrugkiez, e.g. some city blocks north of Blaschkoallee like the Ideal-Siedlung.)

=== Subdivisions ===
==== Neighborhoods ====
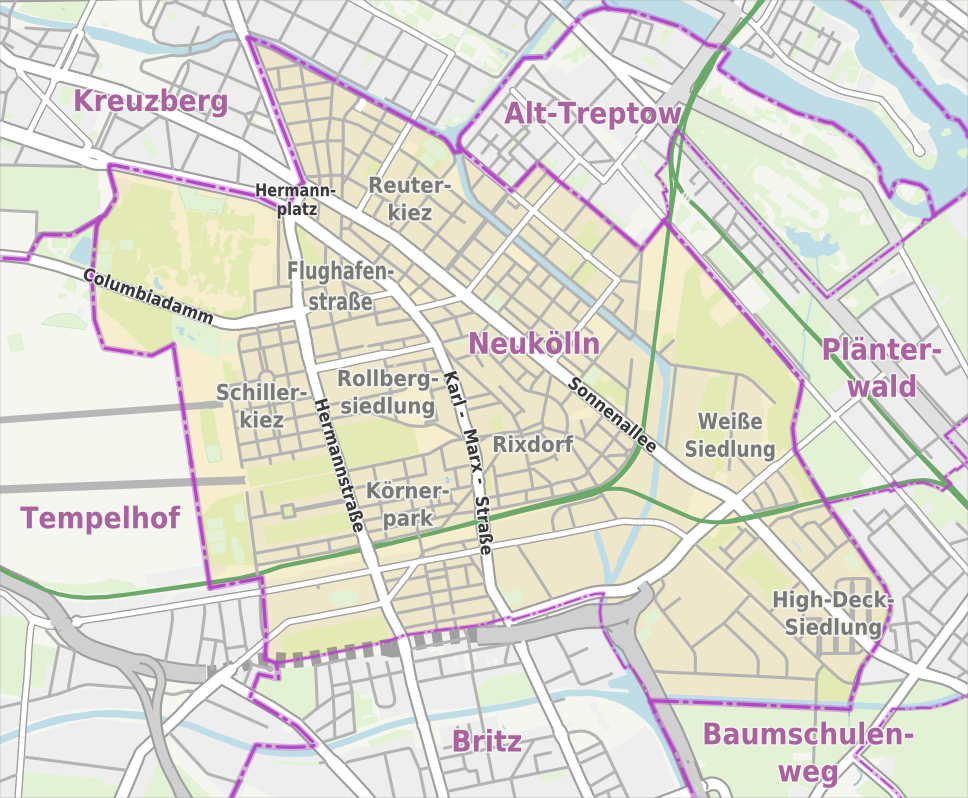
Primary neighborhoods

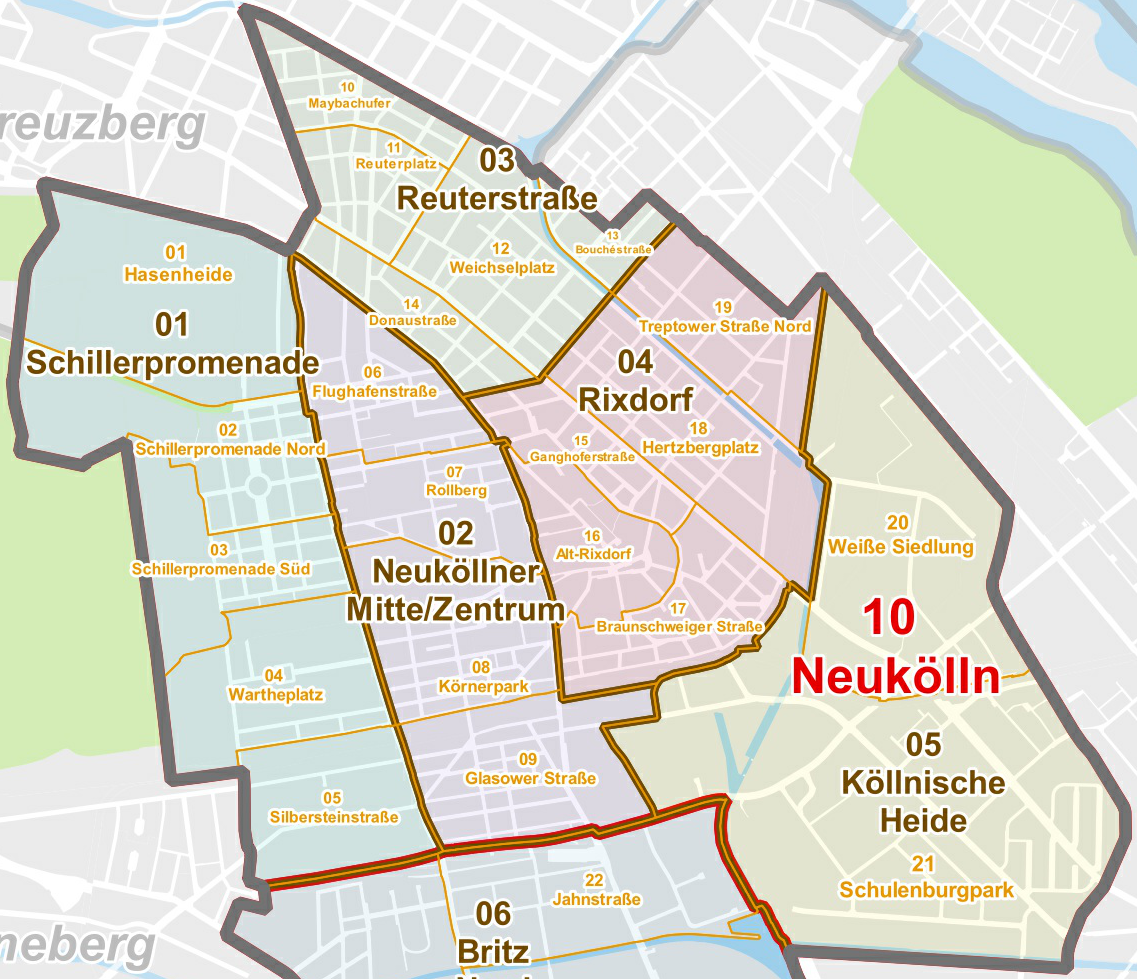
Lifeworld-oriented regions

Neukölln has nine primary neighborhoods (Kieze), administratively called Ortslagen, among them the historical sites of Neukölln's foundation south-east of the quarters's geographical center,

- Richardplatz-Süd (Note: Also known as Richardkiez; the original Richarsdorp, later Ricksdorf, Rixdorf and Deutsch-Rixdorf; named after an unknown historical Richard, probably in the 13th century, and possibly after a local knight or administrator, or after a prominent historical person like Richard of Cornwall or Richard de Bures (see History of Neukölln); in Berlin's LOR framework (see below), Richardplatz-Süd is part of both the planning areas Alt-Rixdorf and Braunschweiger Straße.)

to the south and south-east of the central plaza Richardplatz, and

- Böhmisch-Rixdorf (Note: Also known as Böhmisches Dorf (Bohemian Village); among the Bohemian settlers, it was called Český Rixdorf (Czech Rixdorf) until the early 20th century; in Berlin's LOR framework, Böhmisch-Rixdorf is part of the planning area Alt-Rixdorf.)

to the north and north-west, which together are commonly referred to as Rixdorf or Alt-Rixdorf ("Old Rixdorf"). (Note: In Berlin's LOR framework, the Rixdorf region is much larger and comprises many additional planning areas to the north, east and south of the historical village center Alt-Rixdorf.) The other primary neighborhoods are (from north to south):

- Reuterkiez, (Note: Also known as Reuterquartier; named after the central localities Reuterstraße and Reuterplatz, themselves named after novelist Fritz Reuter; in Berlin's LOR framework, the Reuterkiez is part of a larger region called Reuterstraße, which also includes the secondary neighborhoods Donaukiez and Harzer Straße.)
- Flughafenkiez, (Note: Often called Flughafenstraße, seldomly Flughafenstraßenkiez; the name derives from the central street Flughafenstraße, which refers to the former Tempelhof airport nearby.)
- Schillerkiez, (Note: Also called Schillerpromenade; named after the neighborhood's main street, the Schillerpromenade, itself named after Friedrich Schiller; in Berlin's LOR framework, Schillerpromenade is the name of a much larger region that also includes three additional secondary neighborhoods to the north and south of the actual Schillerkiez.)
- Rollberg, (Note: Also called Rollbergkiez, Rollbergviertel or Rollbergsiedlung; named after the Rollberge, a range of glacial hills (see above); not to be confused with the Rollberge estates, which is the alternative name for the Schwarzwaldsiedlung in Berlin Reinickendorf.)
- Weiße Siedlung, (Note: Lit. "white estates"; named after the white faces of most of the neighborhood's high-rise buildings; not to be confused with the World Heritage Site Weiße Stadt in Berlin Reinickendorf; the Weiße Siedlung is often lumped together with (and even called) the Dammwegsiedlung, even though the latter is a distinct 1920s settlement further south (see below); in Berlin's LOR framework, the two neighborhoods are combined as the planning area Weiße Siedlung, which additionally comprises the eastern Neukölln docklands, the Treptow freight yards, which, despite their name, are part of Neukölln (see below), and major recreational spaces at the eastern outskirts, mostly a large area of privately leased garden allotments at the site of the former Cölln Heath.)
- Körnerpark, (Note: Sometimes referred to as Körnerkiez; named after the Körnerpark, itself named after Franz Körner, the former owner of the gravel quarry, in which the park was created; Körner gifted the quarry to the city of Rixdorf under the condition that the planned park would bear his name.) and
- High-Deck-Siedlung. (Note: Named after the architectural concept of using a close network of pedestrian skyways between the estate buildings; also called Sängerviertel ("Singers' Quarter") due to several street names, e.g. the Michael Bohnen beltway.)

==== Other sites ====
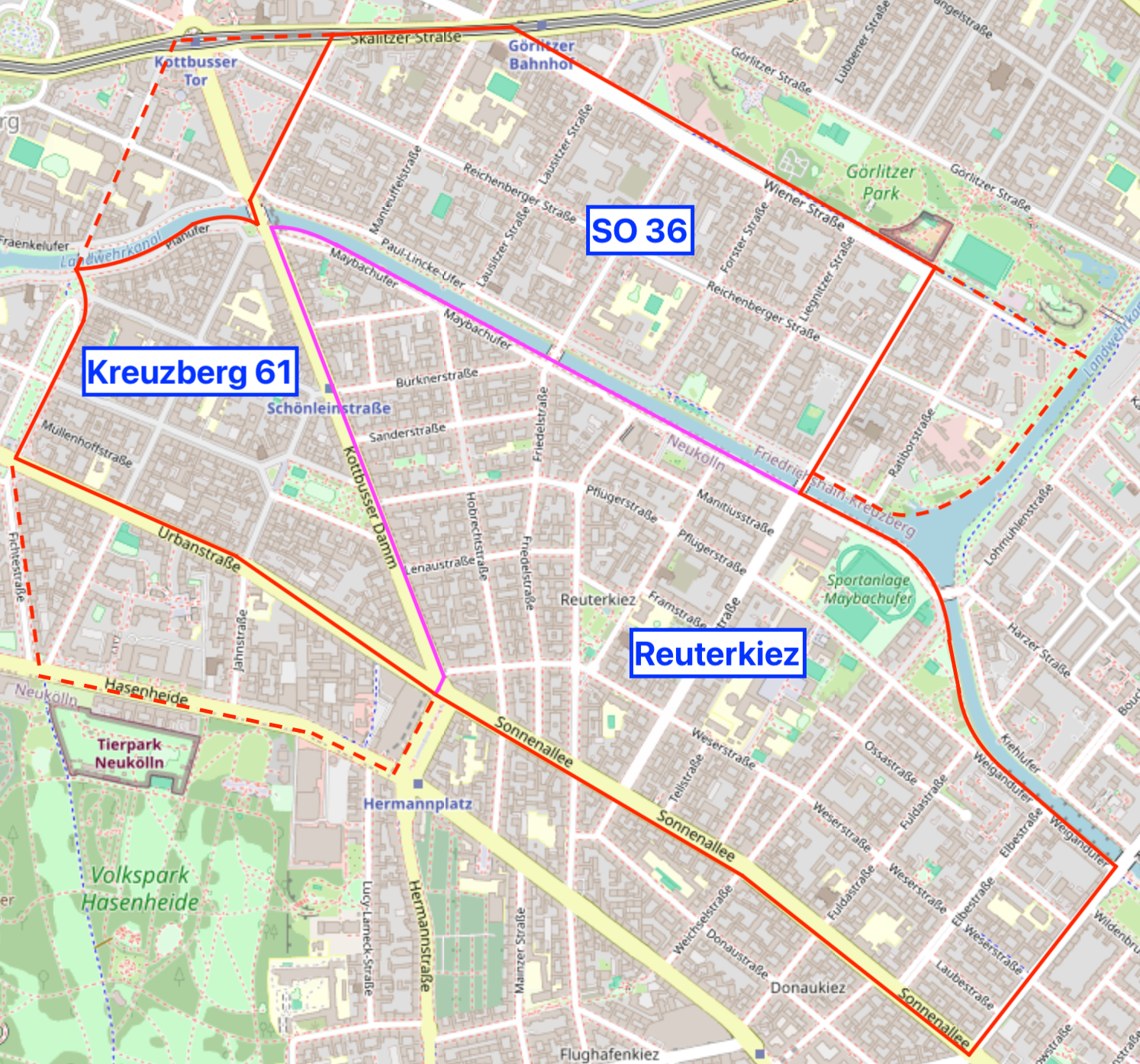
Several commonly recognized secondary neighborhoods exist in Neukölln. The most important and oldest central urban community is the Donaukiez along Donaustraße between Sonnenallee and Karl-Marx-Straße, including Hermannplatz at its western end. (Note: South of the Reuterkiez and part of the LOR region Reuterstraße; named after the river Donau, the German name for the Danube.) The oldest suburban community is the historically important Dammwegsiedlung just south of the Weiße Siedlung, an early modern housing estate from the 1920s. (Note: Also called Siedlung am Dammweg; named after an old Dammweg (path on a dam) across the historical Cöllnische Heide (Cölln Heath) to the former landing stages at the river Spree; administratively part of the planning area Weiße Siedlung, itself part of the LOR region Köllnische Heide.) A recently evolved neighborship of cultural importance is the Weserkiez with its famous party mile around Weserstraße north of Sonnenallee. (Note: Part of both Reuterkiez and Rixdorf, with the Wildenbruchstraße forming the official border; named after the river Weser.) Due to urban development and expansion, many other kiez communities have formed over the decades, sometimes distinguished in the city's official LOR framework (see below) or the focus of current or former neighborhood management, (Note: Examples are: Ganghoferstraße around the border between Donaukiez and Böhmisch-Rixdorf south of Sonnenallee; named after German author Ludwig Ganghofer; in Berlin's LOR framework, the Ganghoferstraße neighborhood belongs solely to the Rixdorf region and is a fairly large area stretching all the way to Thiemannstraße; Warthekiez around Wartheplatz; part of Schillerpromenade, and including the cemetery park Neuer St. Jacobi Friedhof; named after the river Warthe, the German name for the Warta; Harzer Straße, a residential area north of the Neukölln Ship Canal, also called Harzer Kiez, Bouchéstraße or Bouchékiez; nominally part of both Reuterkiez and Rixdorf, with the Wildenbruchstraße forming the official border, but also closely connected with the Kungerkiez in Alt-Treptow nearby; named after the local streets Harzer Straße and Bouchéstraße respectively, themselves named after the Harz region and German politician Johann Bouché (1759–1846); in Berlin's LOR framework, the Harzer Kiez is split into two areas, the small residential area Bouchéstraße in the west and Treptower Straße Nord, a larger partially industrial area in the east; areas south of the Berlin Hermannstraße and Berlin Neukölln stations like Glasower Straße, also called Glasower Kiez (south of Körnerpark and named after the Glasow neighborhood in the town of Mahlow), and Silbersteinstraße, also called Silbersteinkiez (part of Schillerpromenade, and named after German politician Raphael Silberstein); the Glasower Kiez also includes the westernmost parts of Neukölln's industrial park Lahnstraße; Hasenheide, a western secondary neighborhood north of the Schillerkiez with fewer residential infrastructure, but large recreational spaces and parks; it evolved from the old Hasenheide forest of Rixdorf, now a park, literally "hares' heath"; in Berlin's LOR framework, Hasenheide is part of the larger region Schillerpromenade; Schulenburgpark south of Dammwegsiedlung, a small neighborship close to High-Deck-Siedlung; named after the Schulenburg dynasty; in Berlin's LOR framework, Schulenburgpark is the name of a large planning area, which is part of Köllnische Heide, Neukölln's largest region, and comprises the actual Schulenburgpark neighborship, the High-Deck-Siedlung, and many of the industrial sites southeast of the Berlin Ringbahn.) while an outlier is Kreuzkölln, which is a meta-neighborhood and loosely defined cultural sphere, described by a berolinism, a modern jocular toponym, (Note: Portmanteau of "Kreuzberg" and "Neukölln"; the short hands X-Kölln and especially Xkölln are also in use; compare Xhain, short for Kreuzhain, a similar local portmanteau for the borough Friedrichshain-Kreuzberg.) which since the mid-2000s has often been used by new residents and younger natives for the northern parts of the quarter and the surrounding regions of Kreuzberg. (Note: Approximate extent of Kreuzkölln (red: minimum, red dotted: maximum, purple: Reuterkiez wedge) The toponym originally stood for the western part of the Reuterkiez, excluding the neighborhoods Donaukiez and Harzer Straße, and comprising the LOR areas Maybachufer, Reuterplatz and Weichselplatz, which are geographically wedged between the adjacent city blocks of the quarter Kreuzberg, whose neighborhoods SO 36 and Kreuzberg 61 border to the north and west respectively. After many years of gentrification, the toponym Kreuzkölln today describes the western part of the Reuterkiez together with the adjacent city blocks of Kreuzberg, more precisely the Graefekiez and the Reichenberger Kiez, also known as Wiener Kiez, which together have now formed an almost fully integrated, albeit gentrified, social and urban sphere (Johannes Schneider, "Sagt endlich Kreuzkölln!", Tagesspiegel, 12 April 2016); see also History of Neukölln § Berlin-Neukölln in the 21st century.)

==== Urban planning ====
Berlin's official urban planning framework, on the other hand, divides Berlin's boroughs and quarters into so-called Lebensweltlich orientierte Räume ("lifeworld-oriented regions"). In this LOR framework, the quarter of Neukölln, non-administrative district 10 in borough 08, as of 2025, is divided into five regions, each of them further compartmentalized into a total of 21 LORs, also called Planungsräume (planning areas).

Overview: regions, planning areas, neighborhoods and other areas of Neukölln
Region	Region number	Planning area (LOR)	Area number	Primary neighborhoods	Secondary neighborhoods	Neighborships	Other areas	Industry	Other localities
Schillerpromenade	01	Hasenheide	01		Hasenheide		Volkspark Hasenheide		Tierpark Neukölln
Schillerpromenade	01	Schillerpromenade Nord	02	Schillerkiez			Tempelhofer Feld		
Schillerpromenade	01	Schillerpromenade Süd	03	Schillerkiez			Tempelhofer Feld		
Schillerpromenade	01	Wartheplatz	04		Warthekiez		Tempelhofer Feld		Werner-Seelenbinder-Sportpark
Schillerpromenade	01	Silbersteinstraße	05		Silbersteinkiez				Emmauswald, Carl-Weder-Park
Neuköllner Mitte/Zentrum	02	Flughafenstraße	06	Flughafenkiez					
Neuköllner Mitte/Zentrum	02	Rollberg	07	Rollberg			Lessinghöhe		
Neuköllner Mitte/Zentrum	02	Körnerpark	08	Körnerpark			Thomashöhe		Körnerpark
Neuköllner Mitte/Zentrum	02	Glasower Straße	09		Glasower Kiez	Kranoldkiez		Industrial park Lahnstraße	
Reuterstraße	03	Maybachufer	10	Reuterkiez		Friedelkiez	Kreuzkölln		
Reuterstraße	03	Reuterplatz	11	Reuterkiez		Friedelkiez	Kreuzkölln		
Reuterstraße	03	Reuterplatz	11	Reuterkiez		Weserkiez	Kreuzkölln		
Reuterstraße	03	Weichselplatz	12	Reuterkiez		Weserkiez	Kreuzkölln		
Reuterstraße	03	Bouchéstraße	13		Harzer Straße				
Reuterstraße	03	Donaustraße	14		Donaukiez				Hermannplatz
Rixdorf	04	Ganghoferstraße	15			Ganghoferstraße			
Rixdorf	04	Alt-Rixdorf	16	Böhmisch-Rixdorf					
Rixdorf	04	Alt-Rixdorf	16	Richardplatz-Süd					Richardplatz
Rixdorf	04	Braunschweiger Straße	17	Richardplatz-Süd					
Rixdorf	04	Hertzbergplatz	18			Weserkiez	Wohnanlage Ossastraße	Treptow freight yards, industrial park Ederstraße, Neukölln Docklands	Wildenbruchplatz
Rixdorf	04	Treptower Straße Nord	19		Harzer Straße			Treptow freight yards, industrial park Treptower Straße	
Köllnische Heide	05	Weiße Siedlung	20	Weiße Siedlung	Dammwegsiedlung			Neukölln Docklands	Heidekamppark, suburban garden allotments
Köllnische Heide	05	Schulenburgpark	21	High-Deck-Siedlung		Schulenburgpark		Neukölln Harbor, industrial parks Köllnische Heide (Nobelstraße) & Lahnstraße	Heidekamppark, Von-der-Schulenburg-Park

== Nature ==
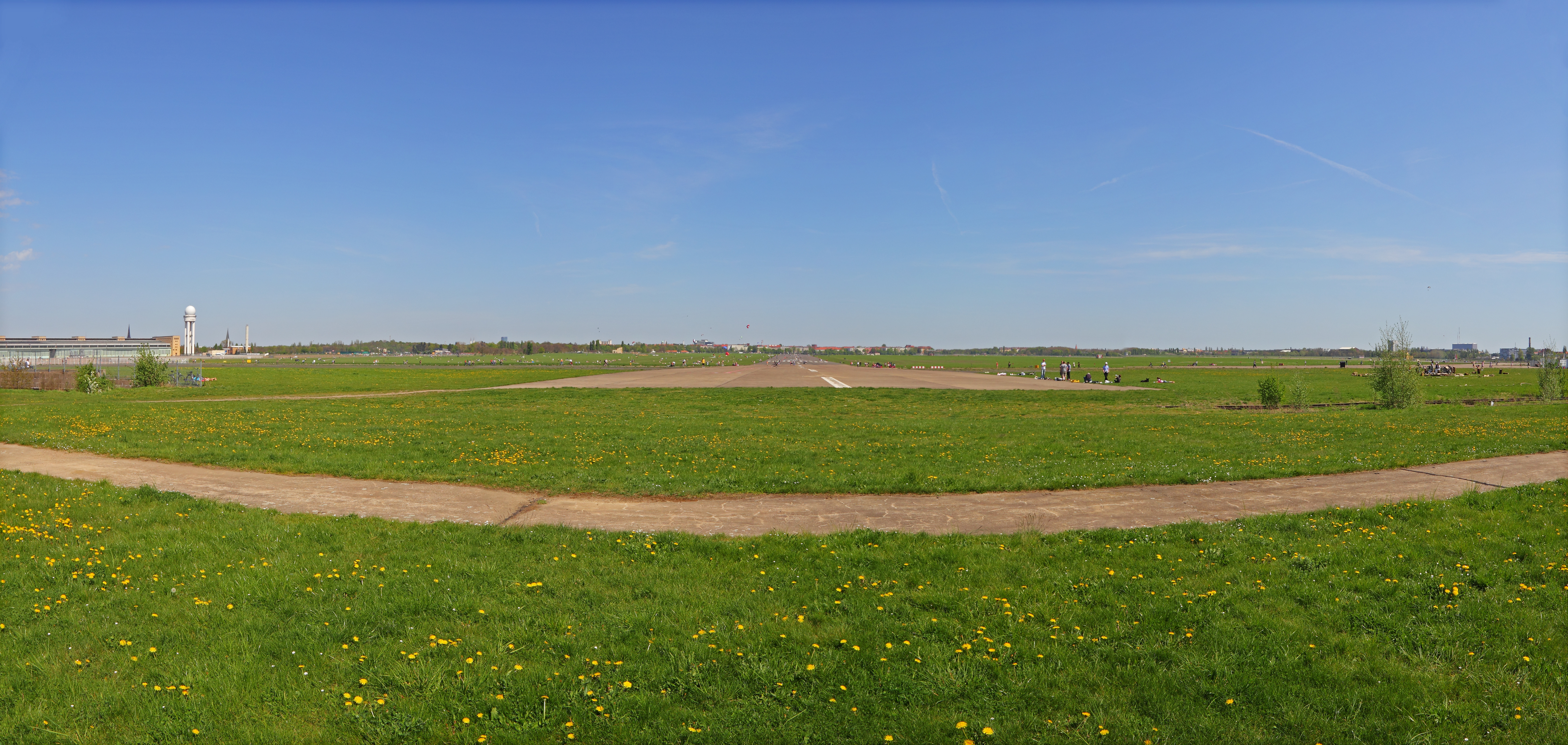
Tempelhofer Feld

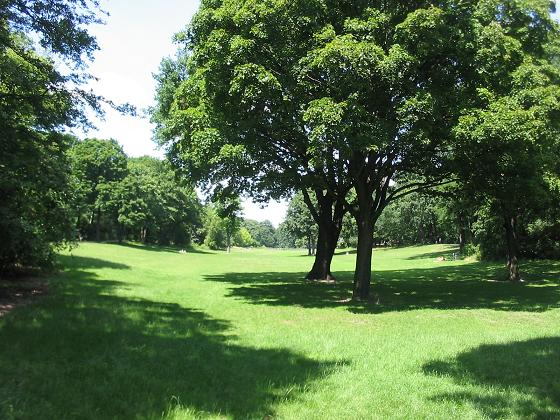
Hasenheide

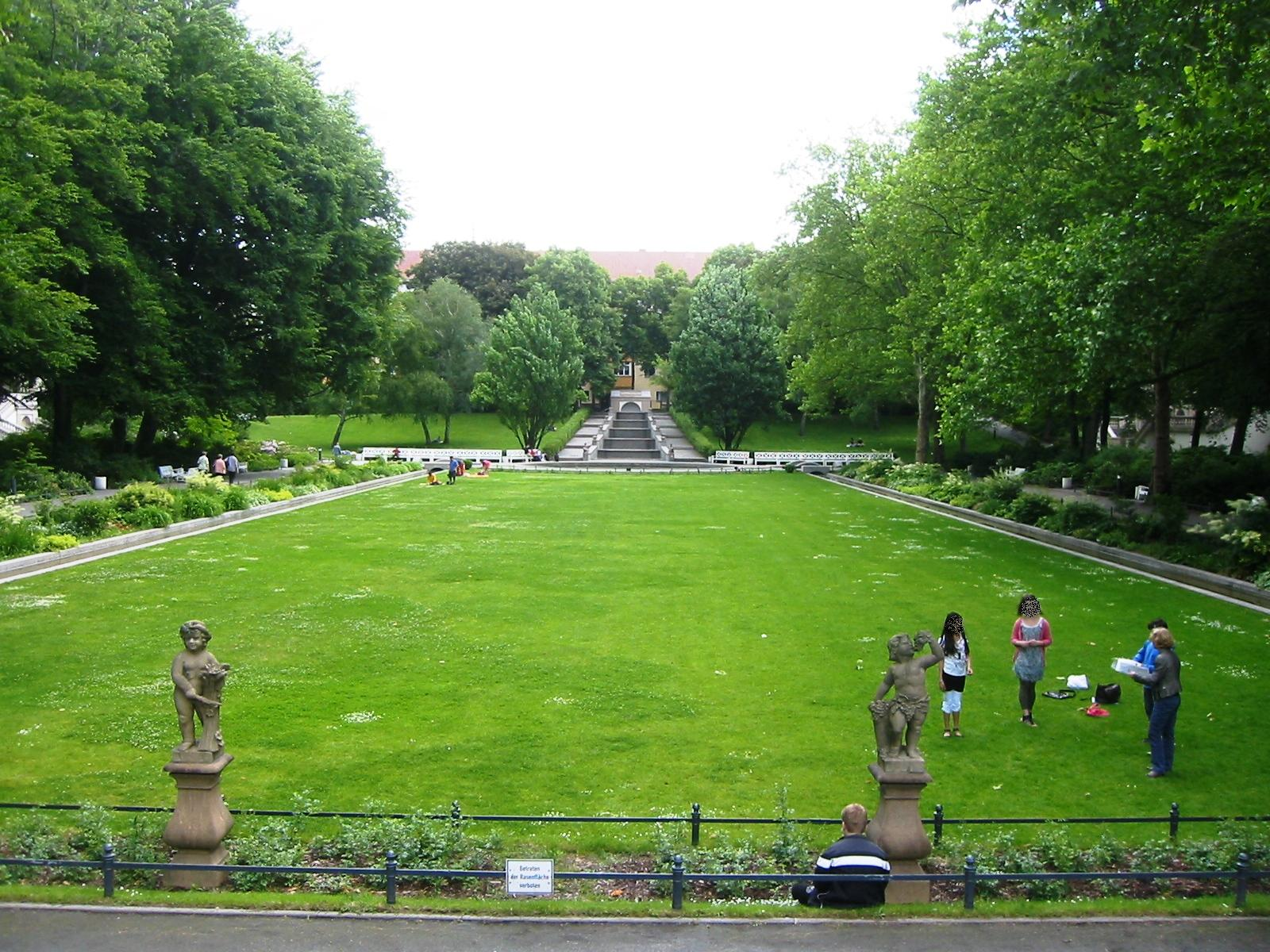
Körnerpark

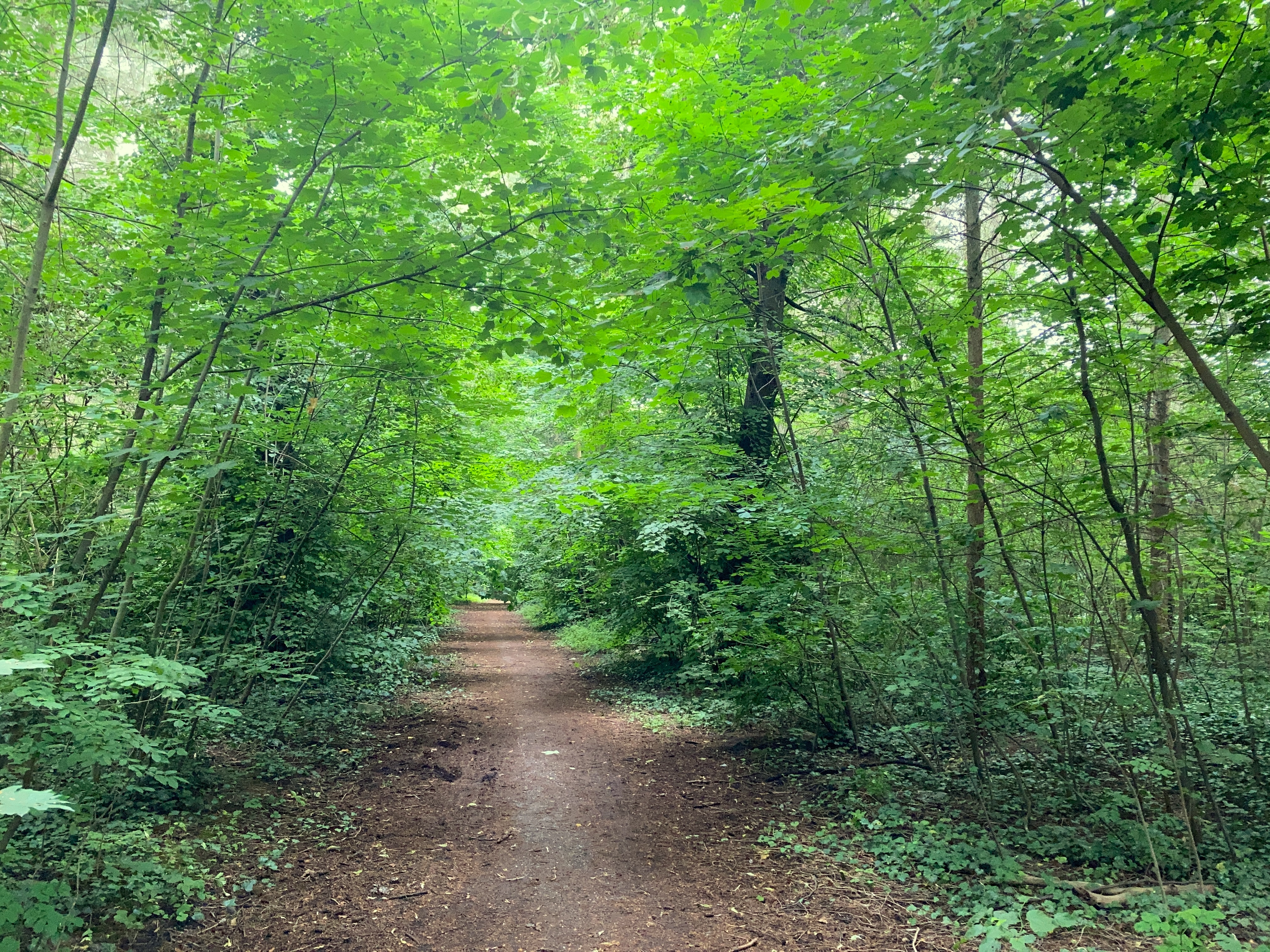
Emmauswald

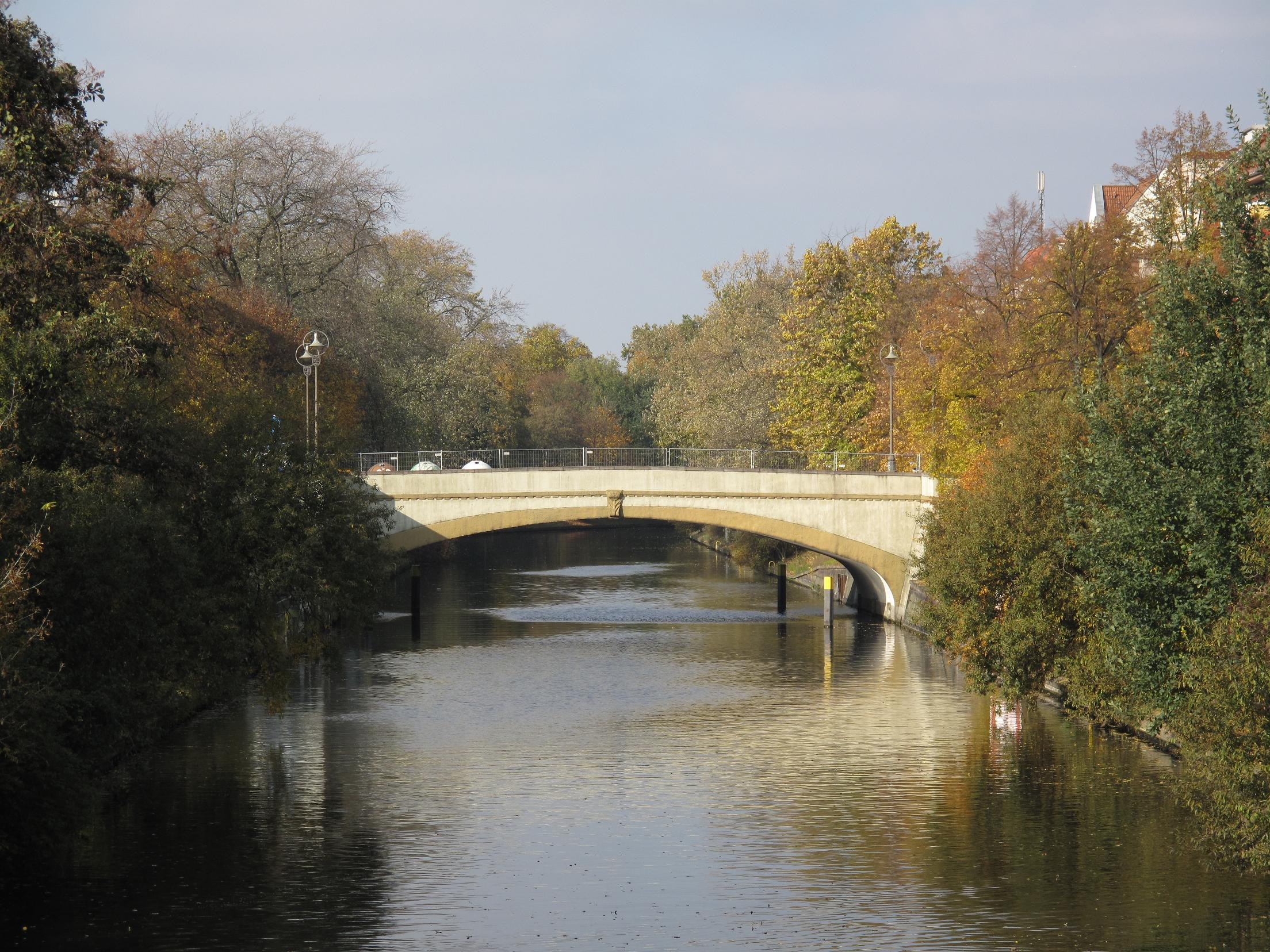
Neukölln Ship Canal

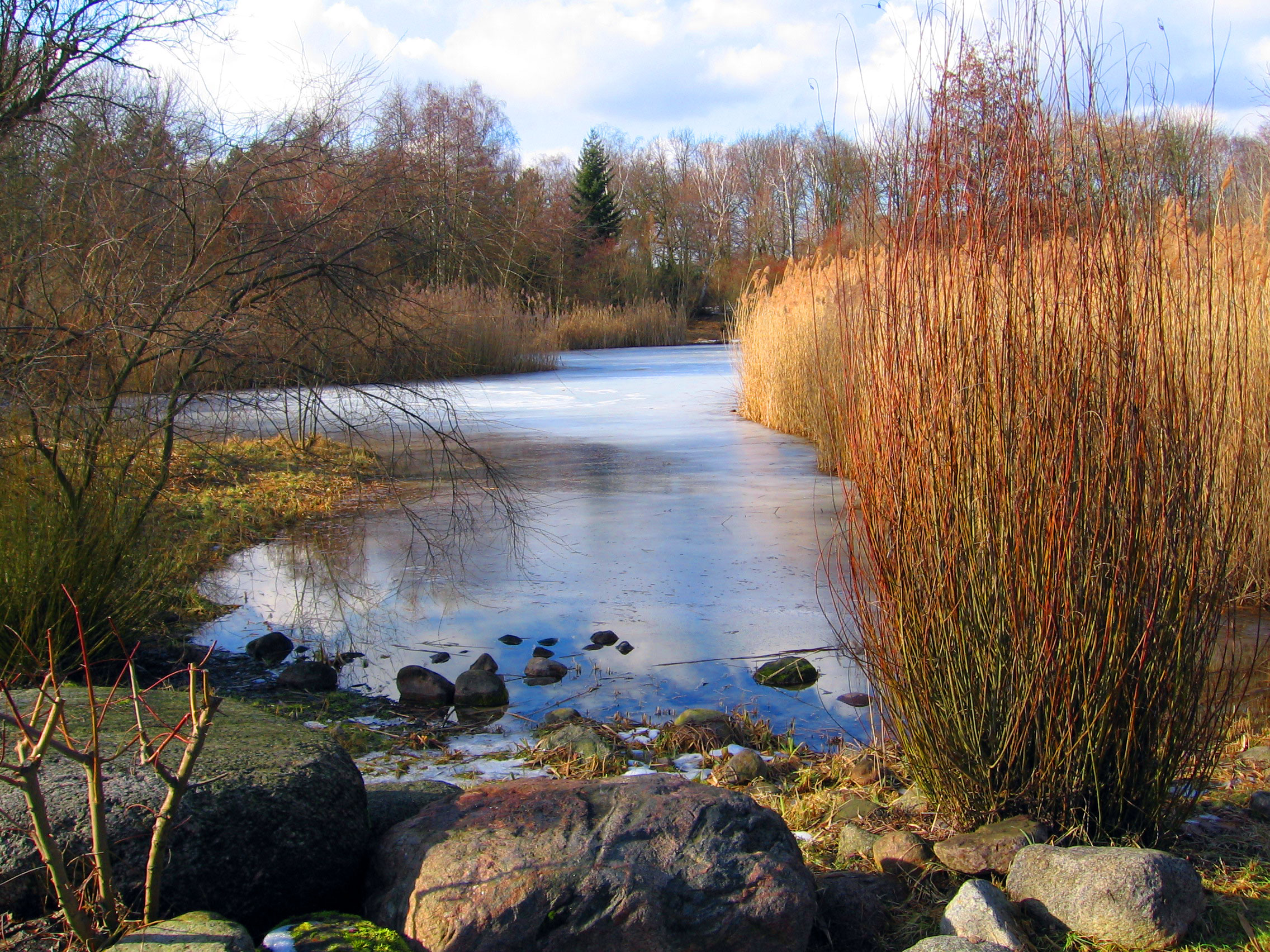
Rixdorfer Teich, Hasenheide

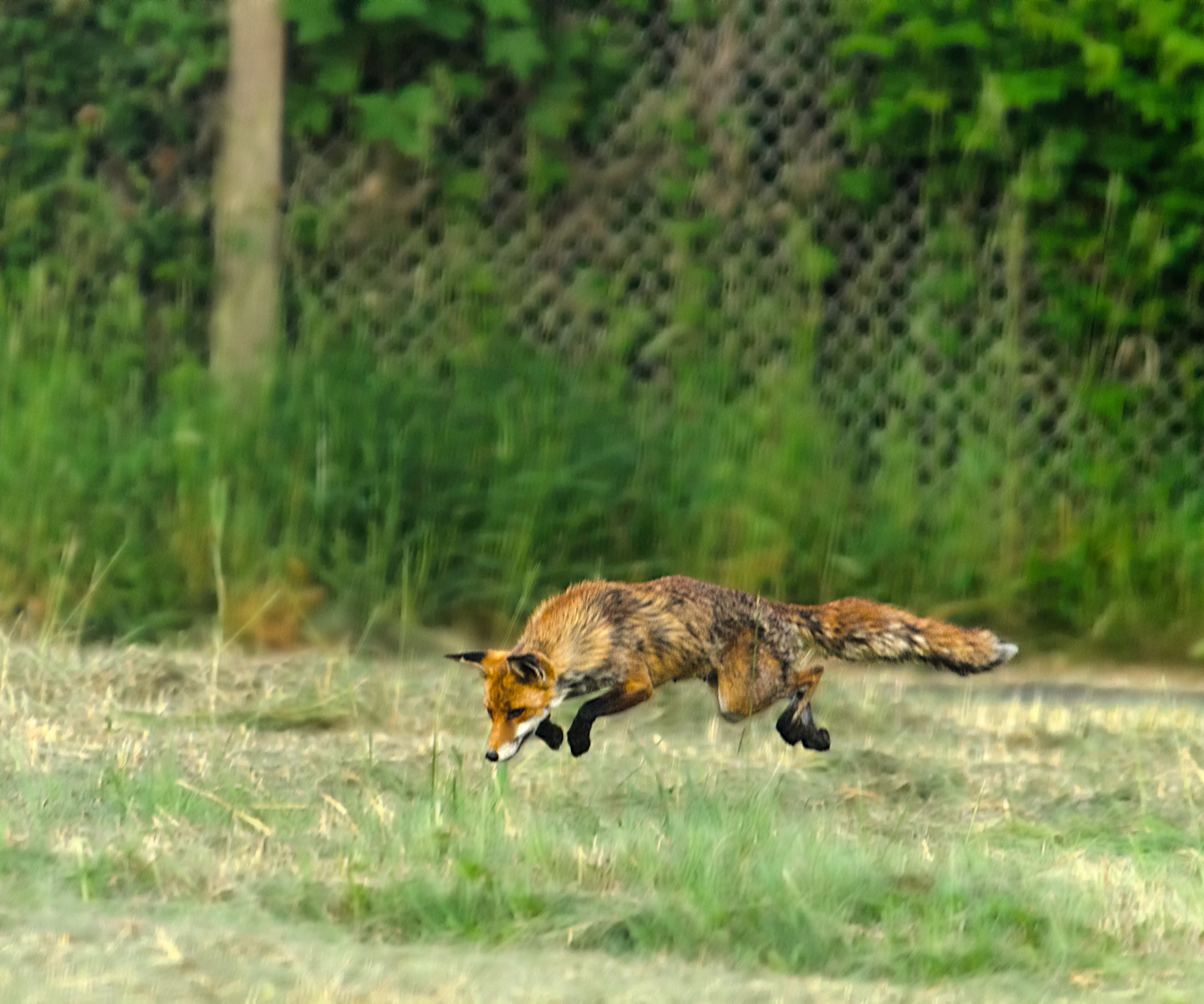
Red fox, Tempelhofer Feld

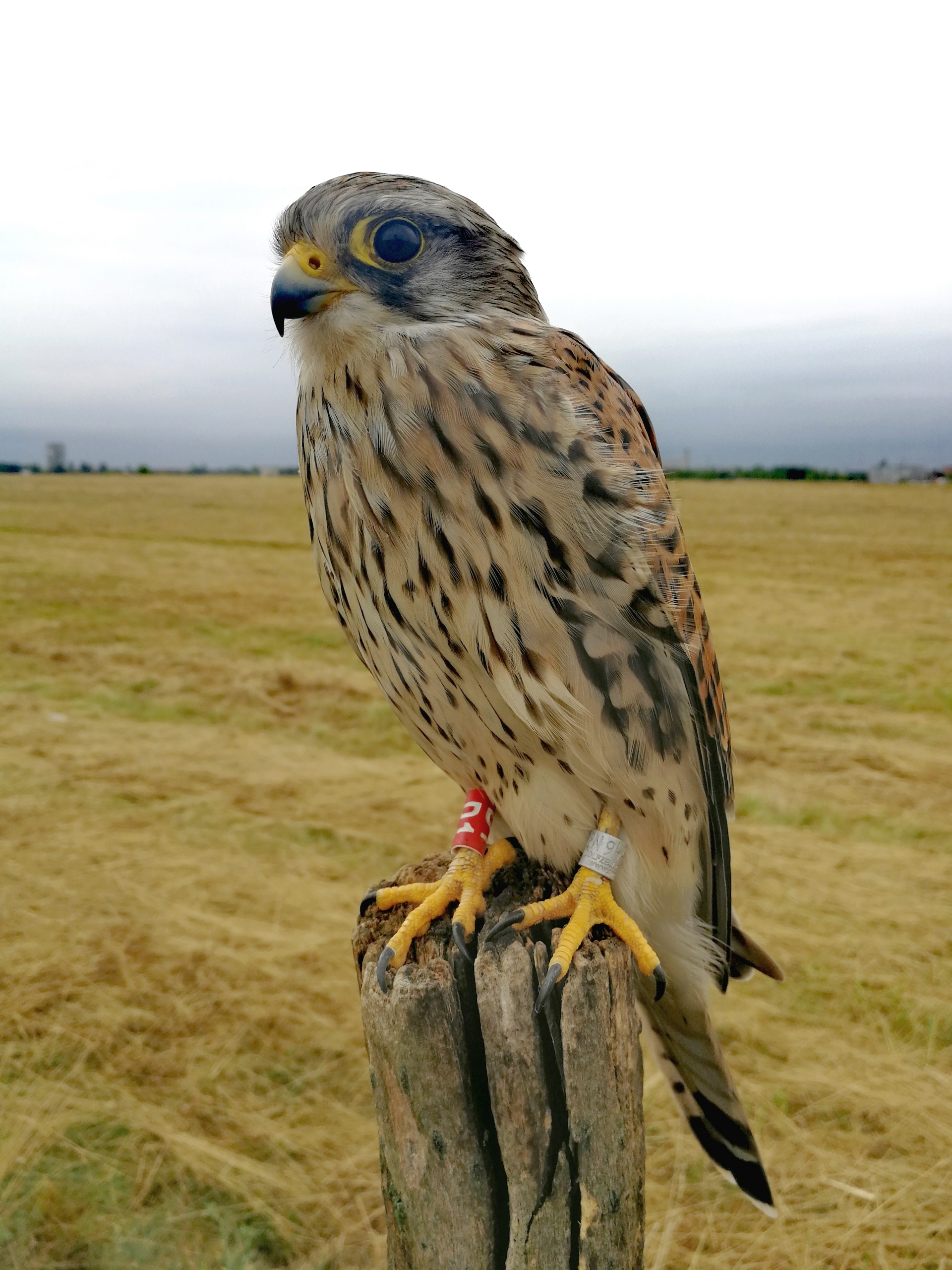
Common kestrel, Tempelhofer Feld

As of 2024, Berlin ranks among the greenest cities in Germany with only 44.5% of sealed ground, an average of 4.24 m^{3}/m^{2} (4.64 cu yd/sq yd) of vegetation, and a 50.6% share of surface area with green space (44%) or water bodies (6.6%), which provides a cooler urban climate and many options for natural habitats and urban recreation. (Note: "Zu viel Grau, zu wenig Grün: Viele deutsche Städte fallen durch im ersten Hitze-Check der Deutschen Umwelthilfe", Deutsche Umwelthilfe, 30 July 2024 (with download); the remaining 4.9% are (partially vegetated) mixed-use areas or uncategorized land types.) Similarly, the borough of Neukölln has only 45.6% of sealed ground, mainly due to its extensive recreational parks, which, together with other nature areas, have a share of ca. 43%, with green spaces at 35%, of which 19.9% are parks and meadows, and up to 8% of water surfaces. However, due to the absence of large-scale true forests (see below), the borough only has an average of 3.0 m^{3}/m^{2} (3.3 cu yd/sq yd) of vegetation. Nevertheless, from 2019 to 2024 this was still enough to ensure an average maximum summer midday surface temperature of 36.01 °C (96.82 °F), more than one degree Celsius (two degrees Fahrenheit) lower than Berlin's hottest borough of Friedrichshain-Kreuzberg, which measured 37.22 °C (99.00 °F). Together with Pankow, this makes Neukölln one of the coolest boroughs in Berlin's inner city, and places it slightly below the class of boroughs that is categorized by an above-average risk of heat exposure for its residents. However, average estimates for the northern quarter of Neukölln with 72.5% sealed ground and only 15% green areas would result in a much higher heat exposure compared to the borough's southern quarters, even though at approximately 7.5%, the quarter Neukölln (including Kreuzberg's Landwehr Canal) has a rather high share of water surface area.

=== Parks and forests ===
The borough of Neukölln, and especially its homonymous quarter, is densely populated and urbanized, and only has 3.1% (2019) of original natural land and true forests left, second to last before the borough Tempelhof-Schöneberg. However, the lack of true forests, which in Neukölln are only 0.1% of the overall surface area, is offset by many green plazas, parks and other vegetated recreational areas at an overall share of 35%, not counting active cemeteries, (Note: Still, due to their old age, many of Neukölln's cemeteries, which are counted as mixed-use areas, now double as recreational parks or tourist locations during opening hours; the most famous and oldest ones are the 1751 Moravian cemetery, the small Böhmischer Gottesacker in Rixdorf, and the 1813 Friedhof hinter der Hasenheide, later renamed Garnisonfriedhof (garrison cemetery), today called Friedhof Columbiadamm, while the largest one, situated between the neighborhoods Rollberg and Körnerpark, is a cemeterial ensemble consisting of St. Thomas, Neue Luisenstadt and St. Michael, of which the former is one of Neukölln's historical garden monuments, originally built in 1872. Four additional active or former cemeteries are now historical monuments, namely the 1888 Emmauskirchhof in the far south, St. Jacobi on Karl-Marx-Straße (1852), the 1866 Turkish cemetery on Columbiadamm (see below), and the western part of St. Thomas (1872), present-day Anita-Berber-Park.) which actually make Neukölln one of the greenest of all Berlin boroughs, even taking the city's top spot with 19.9% of parks and meadows. (Note: "So grün sind die Berliner Bezirke", B.Z., 9 June 2016. Neukölln also has one of Berlin's 76 remaining natural boglands spanning 740 ha (7.400 km^{2}) or 1,828.6 acres (2.86 mi^{2}), primarily the Erlenbruch, which, together with two smaller bogs, has persisted at the brook Rudower Fließ in the borough's far south; Hildburg Bruns, "Moor-Krimi in Köpenick! Versunkener See freigelegt", B.Z., 29 May 2025. Recultivated boglands and a herd of water buffalo are found further east in Neukölln's landscape park Rudow-Altglienicke.)

Green space in the quarter Neukölln has a relatively low share of approximately 15% and is dominated by small to medium-sized parks, but the two major parks in the western part of Neukölln, the Volkspark Hasenheide and the Tempelhofer Feld, more than make up for the lack of large green areas in other spots. Smaller parks are found in all neighborhoods, many of which are among Neukölln's historical garden monuments, for example the Anita-Berber-Park (Schillerpromenade), a former cemetery, and the stadium park of the Werner Seelenbinder sporting grounds, both of which connect to the Tempelhofer Feld, the recently decommissioned cemetery Neuer St. Jacobi Friedhof (Schillerpromenade), now mostly used as a park, with parts under management by the Prinzessinnengärten gardening project, Lessinghöhe and Thomashöhe (Körnerpark), the Körnerpark itself, a former gravel quarry, with the Rübelandpark connecting Thomashöhe and Körnerpark, the Comenius Garden (Rixdorf), Herbert-Krause-Park and Von-der-Schulenburg-Park near High-Deck-Siedlung, and extensive stretches of garden allotments like Helmutstal and Märkische Schweiz close to the quarter's eastern border, including the Heidekamppark, a long green corridor adjacent to the trench Heidekampgraben. On the southern and south-western borders to the quarters Britz and Tempelhof respectively is the Carl-Weder-Park, a stretched park above the underground Stadtring autobahn west of the Britzer Damm. Immediately adjacent to the north is the 3.8 ha (0.04 km^{2}) or 9.4 acres (0.01 mi^{2}) Emmauswald, often called Emmi by Berliners, a former cemetery and the quarter's only true natural forest, (Note: It is also the largest true forest in the Neukölln borough: when the Berlin Forest Administration classified the Emmauswald as a true forest in accordance with §2 Landeswaldgesetz on 30 August 2023, the total area of the borough's forests increased by a factor of three.) with the Emmauskirchhof, a still active graveyard, connecting to the east. Furthermore, several inner-city squares and building complexes have been designed with green stretches. (Note: Examples are monuments like the Reuterpark on Reuterplatz or the Richardpark on Richardplatz, smaller parks like Trusepark, green plazas like Hertzbergplatz and Schierker Platz next to the Körnerpark, dedicated plaza parks like Weichselpark on Weichselplatz and Wildenbruchpark on Wildenbruchplatz, as well as special places like the atrium of Neukölln's Stadtbad (public bath house), or the neighborhood garden Silent Rixdorf in Böhmisch-Rixdorf.)

=== Water bodies ===
In the borough Neukölln, water bodies are up to 8% of the whole surface area, with the northern quarter at approximately 7.5% trailing behind Rudow and especially Britz, two of Neukölln's four other quarters. Like its parks and forests, with the exception of the Emmauswald, all of Neukölln's water bodies are man-made. Several of the quarter's parks contain artificial lakes and ponds, for example the Volkspark Hasenheide (Rixdorfer Teich), the Comenius Garden (Weltenmeer), the Karma Culture Garden in Rixdorf, and the Von-Der-Schulenburg-Park (High-Deck-Siedlung). Neukölln's prominent waterway is the Neukölln Ship Canal, which connects the Teltow and Britz Canals with the Landwehr Canal and (through Kreuzberg) the river Spree. The Neukölln Harbor, consisting of an upper and lower basin and connected via the Neukölln Watergate, was built in tandem with the Britz Harbor north of the Teltow Canal. Smaller landing stages are located along the Neukölln Ship Canal until Kiehlufer, and these Neukölln Docklands are currently subject to extensive redevelopment.

=== Wildlife ===
Despite its dense urban development, Neukölln supports a diverse community of urban wildlife. Larger parks, waterways and cemeteries provide important refuges, while railway corridors and interconnected green spaces allow animals to move between these habitats and into the quarter from greener areas to the south and east.

Common mammals include red foxes, rabbits, red squirrels and other small rodents. Less frequently encountered species include hedgehogs, bats, badgers and beech martens. Eurasian otters have also returned to Neukölln's waterways, while beavers have been recorded along the Landwehr Canal. No wild boar sightings were recorded within the quarter in a 2018 parliamentary survey of Berlin districts.

Birdlife is similar to that of other inner-city districts of Berlin. Sparrows, doves and crows are widespread, while swans, geese and ducks occur along the quarter's canals. Berlin is often described as Germany's "sparrow capital", although modern architecture has reduced nesting opportunities for species such as the common swift and the house martin. The Eurasian sparrowhawk breeds in the Emmauswald, while the common kestrel is also found in the quarter.

Tempelhofer Feld is Neukölln's most important wildlife refuge and supports several protected and endangered species, including the Italian locust, the wood white butterfly, the whinchat and the northern wheatear. Nearly half of the park's bird species are considered highly endangered in Berlin.

The quarter is also home to true toads, several frog species, around 300 species of wild bees and a growing diversity of insects, including the vine weevil. Wildlife and protected areas are managed in part by rangers from Berlin's Stiftung Naturschutz Berlin.

Like the rest of Berlin, Neukölln is home to several invasive species. Raccoons and Himalayan balsam occur throughout Berlin, while Neukölln has a comparatively large population of nutria and muskrat. The red swamp crayfish has spread rapidly through Berlin's waterways, including the Landwehr Canal, prompting proposals to use eels as a biological control.

== History ==
The quarter's history begins with its foundation as a Knights Templar stronghold during the Ostsiedlung era in the late 12th to early 13th century. Following its demilitarization and rededication as an agricultural Templar estate around 1245, its ownership was transferred to the Knights Hospitaller in 1318. The estate was legally elevated to the status of village in its foundational charter of 1360, which is the earliest source for its original toponym, Richardsdorf, which was later contracted to Ricksdorf.

In the 15th century, Ricksdorf became a shared treasury village of the Cölln and Alt-Berlin magistracies, a status that lasted for three centuries through the breakup and reunification of Cölln and Berlin. In the 18th century, its official modern name Rixdorf emerged, and the village was expanded with a large colony of Bohemian refugees. In the 19th century, the colony Böhmisch-Rixdorf eventually united with the historical Deutsch-Rixdorf, and the new village grew into the largest town of Prussia, becoming an important industrial center of the region. In 1899, Rixdorf was granted the status of an independent and free city. In 1912, the city was renamed to Neukölln.

With the 1920 Greater Berlin Act, Neukölln merged with the city of Berlin and, together with the former villages and towns of Britz, Buckow and Rudow, formed Neukölln, a large borough of Germany's capital, which stretches all the way from the city center's lower east side to the southern border with Brandenburg. Since the Weimar Republic, Neukölln's fate has been closely intertwined with the history of Berlin. Over its long history, the quarter Neukölln has always been a popular destination for colonists, migrant workers, refugees and immigrants.

== Demographics and social statistics ==
As of 2025, Neukölln with its 162,548 inhabitants has the second-highest population of Berlin's quarters after Prenzlauer Berg. The borough's current budget deficit stands at €10.2 million ($11,39 million), and in 2024 Neukölln's district office declared the third spending freeze in a year. In 2023, the unemployment rate in Neukölln was at 14.1%. The poverty rate was at 29%, more than a third of Neukölln's children and adolescents were poor or at risk of poverty, and the borough is currently the only German district with its own poverty commissioner.

As of 2025, 58.3% of residents in the quarter Neukölln are German or foreign first or later-generation immigrants, up from 46% in 2019 and 48% in 2021, with roots in more than 155 countries. The overall share of foreigners in the quarter currently stands at 36%, and has continued to rise in the past years due to western immigration and the ongoing European migrant crisis, while the number of Ukrainians in the borough Neukölln increased by 11.9% in 2023 after the Russian invasion of Ukraine. Due to the quarter's dense urban character, only far less than five percent of Berlin's refugees can be accommodated in Neukölln. (Note: As of July 2024, the whole borough of Neukölln houses only 1,703 of Berlin's refugees (4.68%); "Überblick über die Flüchtlingsunterkünfte in Berlin", Landesamt für Flüchtlingsangelegenheiten, 7 July 2024. As of January 2024, of the borough's seven refugee centers, only two were in the quarter Neukölln, a larger one on Karl-Marx-Straße in Neukölln's southern dockland area just north of Grenzallee, and a smaller one at the Kiefholzstraße near the eastern border to Plänterwald. However, the Berlin Senate plans to open a large new refugee center on the street Hasenheide right on the border between Kreuzberg and Neukölln, including a center for unaccompanied minors, and its close proximity to Hermannplatz and other neighborhoods with an already existing high share of migrant crime like the Donaukiez has been harshly criticized by politicians of both affected boroughs; Susanne Rost, "Flüchtlingsunterkunft an der Hasenheide ab 2026: Pläne sorgen für Unruhe in Kreuzberg und Neukölln", Berliner Zeitung, 7 January 2025 (archived).) As of 2025, the percentage of foreigners without German citizenship is 21.6% on the low end in Bouchéstraße (LOR 100313), and as high as 42.9% in Treptower Straße Nord (LOR 100419), while the highest share in the quarter's historical center stands at 40.3% in the Donaustraße neighborhood (LOR 100314). The bulk of the most recent migration originated in Vietnam and Moldova. (Note: As of September 2026, approximately 500 refugees have been reaching Berlin every month, with the majority arriving from Vietnam, Moldova, Turkey and Afghanistan; "Zugangslage Geflüchteter für Berlin", Landesamt für Flüchtlingsangelegenheiten, 11 November 2025.)

=== Crime, police and fire safety ===
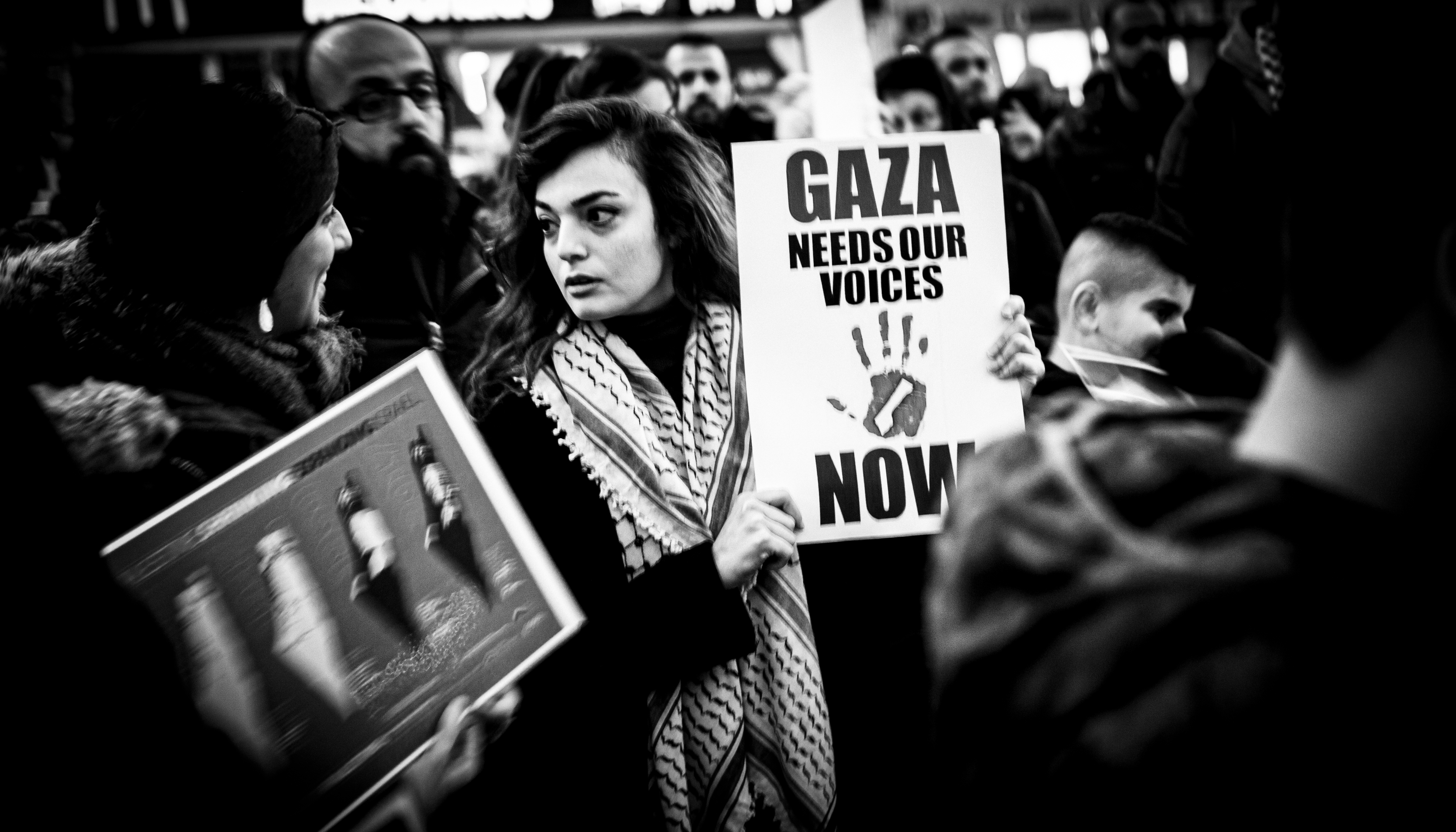
Gaza protest, Hermannplatz, 2019

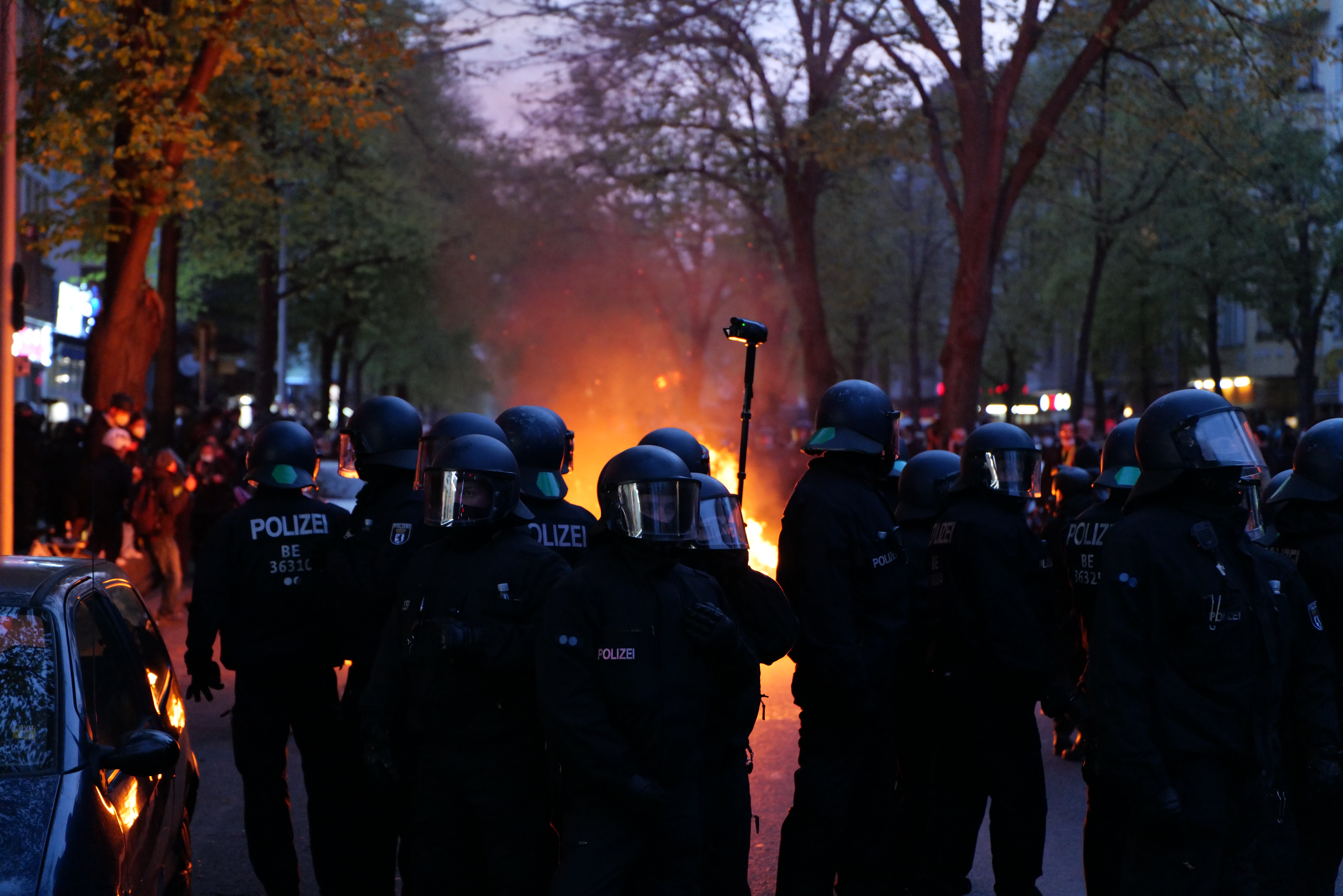
Revolutionary 1st of May demonstration, Sonnenallee, Neukölln, 2021

Two out of Berlin's seven so-called "crime-burdened locations" (kriminalitätsbelastete Orte, kbOs) are in Neukölln, Hermannplatz with Donaukiez including Sonnenallee, and Hermannstraße around Hermannstraße Station, with the local U-Bahn lines connecting to four of Berlin's five other kbOs. (Note: The U8 directly connects Neukölln's and two other important kbOs, Kottbusser Tor in Kreuzberg and Alexanderplatz in Mitte, with two other kbOs close-by, the Görlitzer Park with Wrangelkiez in Kreuzberg and (via the U-Bahn line U1) Warschauer Brücke in Friedrichshain; Jörn Hasselmann, "Dreck, Drogen, Obdachlosigkeit: Wie die BVG Berliner U-Bahnhöfe sauberer machen will", Tagesspiegel, 14 February 2024. Before Berlin's 2025 general weapons ban in the city's public transport system (see below), Neukölln's stations of the U8, especially Hermannplatz, were among Berlin's U-Bahn stations with the highest crime rate due to their role as locations for drug trafficking and drug-related (violent) crime; Dominik Mai, "Besonders viele Gewalttaten: Das ist Berlins gefährlichste U-Bahnlinie", Tagesspiegel, 4 November 2024.) Especially in these two kbOs and their surrounding city blocks, Neukölln is also characterized by social and religious conflicts, manifesting in educational challenges, violent felonies (Note: Crime statistics only exist for the borough of Neukölln, and in 2024, the number of overall registered cases stagnated at 13,601, after having risen to 13,794 in 2023, but still remains below the previous decade's maximum of 14,406 in 2015. Generally, Neukölln, in absolute and relative numbers, has fewer registered and assumed criminal cases than the boroughs Mitte, Kreuzberg-Friedrichshain and Charlottenburg-Wilmersdorf. As in all of Berlin, violent felonies in Neukölln have been steadily rising for the last decade to a new high of 1,393 in 2023, stagnating at 1,386 in 2024. However, the number of aggravated assaults, which, compared to the pre-pandemic high, had grown by more than 10% from 383 in 2020 to 423 cases, climbed further to 451 cases in 2024; for the full statistics, see e.g. "Kriminalitätsatlas Berlin", Polizei Berlin.) including occasional stabbings and gun violence, organized crime by the clans, ranging from recurring gang and drug violence to protection racketeering, and occasional rioting and arson, anti-semitism, (Note: While right-wing ideologies still account for a large number of anti-semitic cases in Neukölln, the alliance between Neukölln's large and long-standing Palestinian expat community, new Muslim immigrants, the quarter's strong local grassroots radical left counterculture and politicians of Neukölln's chapter of Die Linke has led to an increase in pro-Palestinian propaganda, and of the overall number of anti-semitic felonies, notably during the Gaza war; Katrin Elger, "I Actually Don't Like Hamas, But…" , Der Spiegel, 23 October 2023 (see also Migrantifa); Alexander Fröhlich, "'Es wird mehr als einen Mord an Israelis brauchen': Im Epizentrum der Hamas-Versteher der Berliner Linken", Tagesspiegel, 17 October 2024. According to 2025 crime statistics, antisemitic felonies due to left-wing ideologies were, despite the ongoing Gaza protests, still only a third of reported incidents with right-wing perpetrators, and over the years, the latter remained stable at less than one incident per day in all of Berlin. Cases based on foreign political and religious ideologies, however, rose from 30 to 1832 in 2025, especially in the inner-city boroughs like Neukölln, Mitte and Friedrichshain-Kreuzberg; Alexander Fröhlich, "Jüdisches Leben als Feindbild: Antisemitische Straftaten in Berlin erreichen neuen Höchststand", Tagesspiegel, 23 February 2026. State and borough integration commissioners have blamed this development both on the historically intrinsic anti-judaistic nature of the Islamic religion, or on experiences with islamophobia and religious prejudice, and in the internalization of the negative stereotypes associated with Neukölln's Muslims and the quarter's generally false stigma as a failed district; Güner Balcı, "'Zu viele meist muslimische Einwandererkinder wachsen mit den Geboten der Unfreiheit auf'", Sueddeutsche Zeitung, 8 February 2024; see also Güner Balcı in: Katrin Elger, "Muslim Anti-Semitism in Berlin: 'Wide Swaths of Arab-Speaking Population Harbor Sympathies for Terrorists'", Der Spiegel, 11 October 2023; for an example, cf. e.g. Madlen Haarbach, "'Wir sehen das als Mordversuch': Mutmaßlich pro-palästinensischer Brandanschlag auf Neuköllner Kneipe 'Bajszel', Tagesspiegel, 29 September 2024; Derviş Hızarcı in: Madlen Harbach, "Warum immer Neukölln?", Tagesspiegel, 28 October 2024.) transphobia and homophobia. (Note: According to official numbers for the whole of Berlin, the total number of "crimes against sexual orientation or gender-related diversity" reached its historical high of 690 cases in 2023, while the highest number of violent crime had its high at 165 cases a year earlier. Within the quarter Neukölln, only a few streets and city blocks are potentially queerphobic hotspots, but those have still raised the whole borough to join the Mitte borough in the top two ranks, compared to other boroughs of Berlin, with 22 violent felonies and 67 overall cases. However, in 2024, criminal cases in all categories except anti-queer propaganda have dropped significantly in Berlin to 579 overall, to 104 violent felonies and to 452 other felonies like insults, harassment and property damage. Since many of the cases are everyday insults and harassment, the clear-up rate also dropped from its 2016 high of 47% to 35.8% in 2024. Since 2015, queerphobic felonies have risen almost fivefold, with 66% committed against male victims, 25,6% against female victims, and the remaining against non-binary or unknown victims. 81,6% of all suspects were male, while in violent felonies, female suspects are represented slightly higher with 22.4%. Of all cases in Berlin, 79.8% were committed for indeterminate reasons, 16.9% due to right-wing ideologies, and 2.8% due to religious or foreign cultural reasons (see also LGBT people and Islam), with the latter having dropped sharply by more than 50% since the 2023 high. Cf. "Polizeiliche Kriminalstatistik Berlin", Polizei Berlin: Landeskriminalamt, Berlin 2025, s.v. "Ausführliches Zahlenmaterial: 2024 – Politisch motivierte Kriminalität in Berlin 2024" (PDF, 22 February 2025), p. 16–18 s.v. "1.2.3: Fallaufkommen der Hasskriminalität gegen die sexuelle Orientierung und/oder gegen das Geschlecht/die sexuelle Identität bzw. die geschlechtsbezogene Diversität"; for reports on the 2023 high, see e.g. Alexander Fröhlich, "Mehr queerfeindliche Taten: Berliner Polizei meldet Höchststand", Tagesspiegel, 27 July 2024; Carolina Schwarz, "Wie bunt ist Neukölln wirklich?", tageszeitung, 12 February 2024.) Among the critical annual events for the Berlin Police are the so-called Revolutionary 1st of May Demonstration, which usually takes place in Kreuzberg and Neukölln as part of the local May Day, and the New Year's Eve festivities, which in recent past have often resulted in rioting and arson. Since 2022, Neukölln has had the highest garbage pollution of all Berlin boroughs.

Neukölln, together with the borough Neukölln, is part of the Directorate 5 of the Berlin Police. The quarter Neukölln is patrolled by Precinct 54 (Sonnenallee) and Precinct 55 (Rollbergstraße), while the S-Bahn and intercity trains and stations are patrolled by the German Federal Police. For Berlin's and Neukölln's kbOs, the police have been granted special authorities, specifically identity verification and searches of persons or their belongings without a warrant, probable cause or reasonable suspicion, which is embedded in a general weapons ban including the right to warrantless searches for Berlin's public transport system, enacted by the Berlin Senate in July 2025 after amendments to Berlin's ASOG law and constitution. (Note: "Waffen- und Messerverbotszonen (WMVZ) in Verkehrsmitteln des öffentlichen Personennahverkehrs (ÖPNV) und Einrichtungen des öffentlichen Personenverkehrs (ÖPV)", Polizei Berlin. The weapons ban under Berlin state law does not cover the S-Bahn trains and stations, because these are under federal jurisdiction and patrolled by the German federal police; however, the federal police have independently and regularly issued an on-demand general weapons ban for many of Berlin's and Potsdam's S-Bahn and intercity train stations to augment Berlin state law; "Wochenlanges Waffenverbot an 16 Bahnhöfen tritt in Kraft", RBB24, 1 October 2025.) Additional continuous AI-assisted video surveillance of all kbOs is to commence in 2026.

As with the police, Neukölln is part of the Directorate 5 of the Berlin Fire Brigade. It is served by the Fire Stations 5000 and 5001, whereas the latter is part of Berlin's volunteer fire department. Both stations are in the center of Neukölln on Kirchhofstraße in Rixdorf, so the neighborhoods of Neukölln are often served by stations in adjacent quarters, for example the Reuterkiez by Fire Stations 1600 and 1601 on Wiener Straße in Kreuzberg nearby.

== Transport ==
Transportation in Neukölln comprises the public and private transport systems serving the Neukölln quarter of Berlin. The quarter is served by the Berlin U-Bahn, Berlin S-Bahn, bus and road networks, together with cycling and pedestrian infrastructure, inland waterways and freight railways. These networks connect Neukölln with the rest of Berlin, Brandenburg and Berlin Brandenburg Airport, while the Neukölln Harbor remains an important centre for freight transport.

Because of its dense urban character, transport in Neukölln is dominated by walking, cycling and public transport. Since the early 21st century, transport planning has increasingly focused on improving conditions for pedestrians and cyclists, reducing motor traffic, and expanding public transport. Future projects include planned extensions to the U-Bahn and tram networks, new bus services and other improvements to regional connectivity.

== Religion ==
The old village of Rixdorf had been part of the Holy Roman Empire as a Knights Templar and Hospitaller settlement, so it was historically a Roman Catholic village. However, the Reformation in the 16th century changed the religious makeup of many German regions, especially in the northern and eastern parts of the empire. Furthermore, in the early 18th century, Rixdorf came under Prussian political and cultural hegemony, which included Protestantism as the effective church of the state, so the Christian affiliative distribution gradually shifted away from the Roman faith.

Following the secularization in the age of Enlightenment after the Reformation, many of the 20th century's global secular, atheist and sometimes downright antireligious political ideologies like communism, socialism and national socialism flourished (and clashed) in Berlin (see History of Neukölln § Berlin-Neukölln), and a Marxist-Leninist regime eventually ruled over the Eastern parts of Germany and East Berlin for many decades. For this reason, a large part of Germany's population today is not affiliated with any religion, and Berlin in particular is often called the "atheist capital of the world". Beyond that, Neukölln had always been a left-leaning working class district, and a home to progressive voices from social reformists to Biblical critics like Bruno Bauer, so the effects with regard to irreligion are visible to this day.

German statistics offices are not required to gather information on the religious affiliations of the citizenry. The German church tax system, however, offers insight into the membership strength of at least the two primary Christian denominations in the borough of Neukölln. As of 2025, only 19.02% of Neukölln's residents are Christian, of which 7.18% are Catholic, while 11.84% belong to one of Germany's associated mainstream Protestant denominations (EKD). At roughly 72%, the vast majority of Berlin's residents, however, is irreligious, while 1.5% are of other faiths, not counting Islam, with similar numbers to be expected for Neukölln.

Within Neukölln's cosmopolitan citizenry, many other religions and denominations are present and thriving. The borough of Neukölln is home to several thousand Hindus, mainly from India, Sri Lanka and Bangladesh, and especially the number of Indian expats has been rising steadily since the 2022 enactment of the Deutsch-indisches Migrationsabkommen (German-Indian Treaty on Migration).

=== Catholicism ===
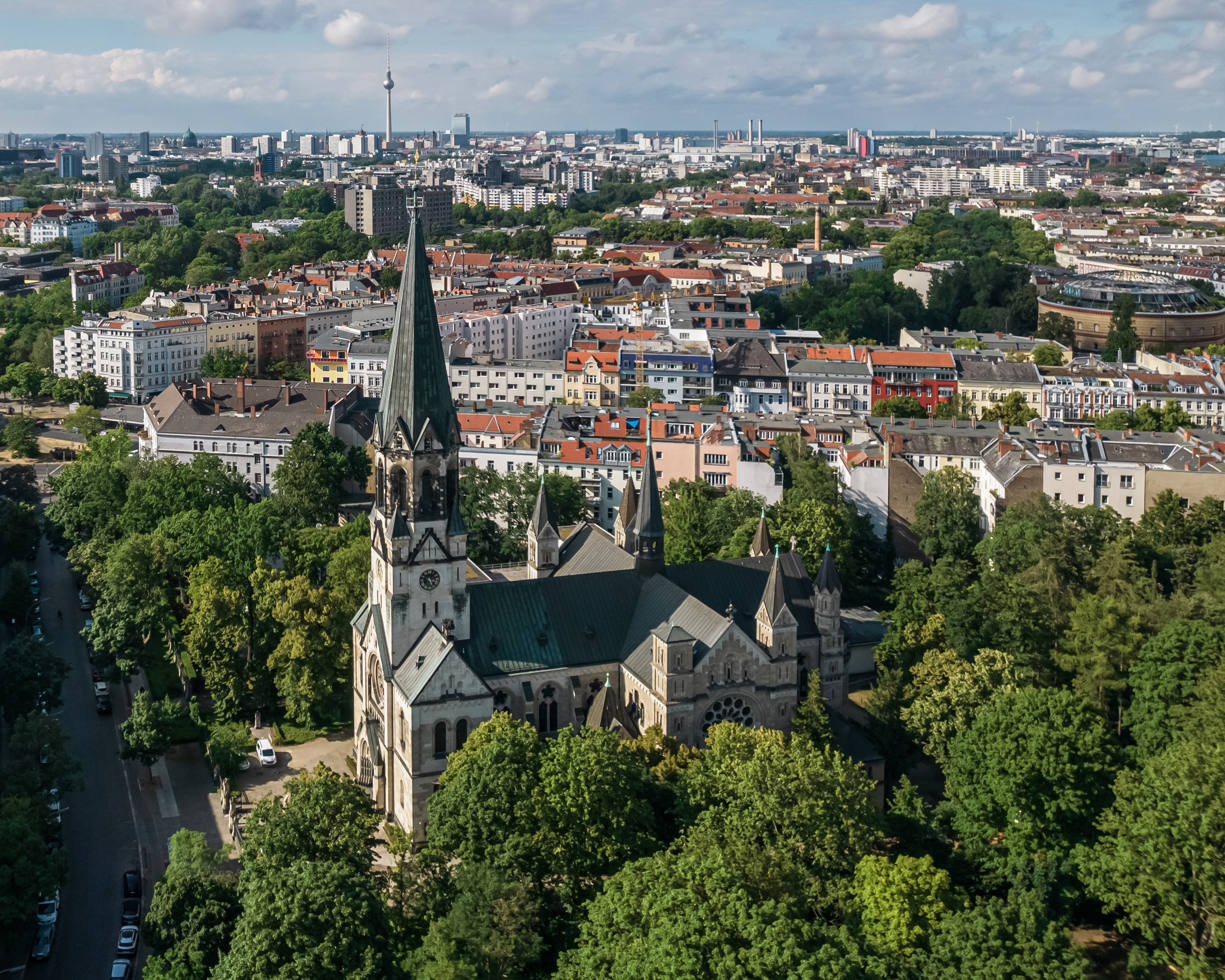
The Fraenkelufer Synagogue complex on the Landwehr Canal, c. 1917.

The most prominent Roman Catholic church is the Basilica of Saint John the Baptist at the western edge of the Volkspark Hasenheide next to the Holy See's Apostolic Nunciature near Südstern. A Basilica minor since 1906, it was constructed by August Menken between 1894 and 1897 in the Rhenish-Romanesque style, and to this day remains the largest Roman church of Berlin. It is also home to the expatriate Polish Catholic community. Originally constructed as a garrison church for Berlin's Roman Catholic soldiers, it today still serves as the cathedral for the Military Ordinariate of Germany. It is the oldest Roman church in Neukölln, dedicated in the presence of William II and Augusta Victoria on 8 May 1897, one and a half months before Rollberg's St. Clara.

The youngest original Roman church is St. Christopher at the Reuterplatz, built between 1929 and 1930 in the new objective style. Technically, postmodernist St. Richard in Rixdorf was inaugurated and rededicated in 1975, but replaced an older chapel at the same location. Overall, together with St. Edward in the Silbersteinkiez, Neukölln has five Roman Catholic churches.

The only church in Neukölln belonging to one of Berlin's Roman Orthodox denominations is Saint Boris the Baptist Cathedral of the Bulgarian Orthodox parish, which is located near Hermannstraße on the grounds of the cemetery Jerusalem und Neue Kirche. (Note: The Romanian Orthodox parish, on the other hand, has found a home in the Protestant Martin Luther Church (see below).) Finally, the church on Rollberg's Roland-Krüger-Straße near the park Lessinghöhe is home to the free Catholic Apostolic community.

=== Hinduism ===
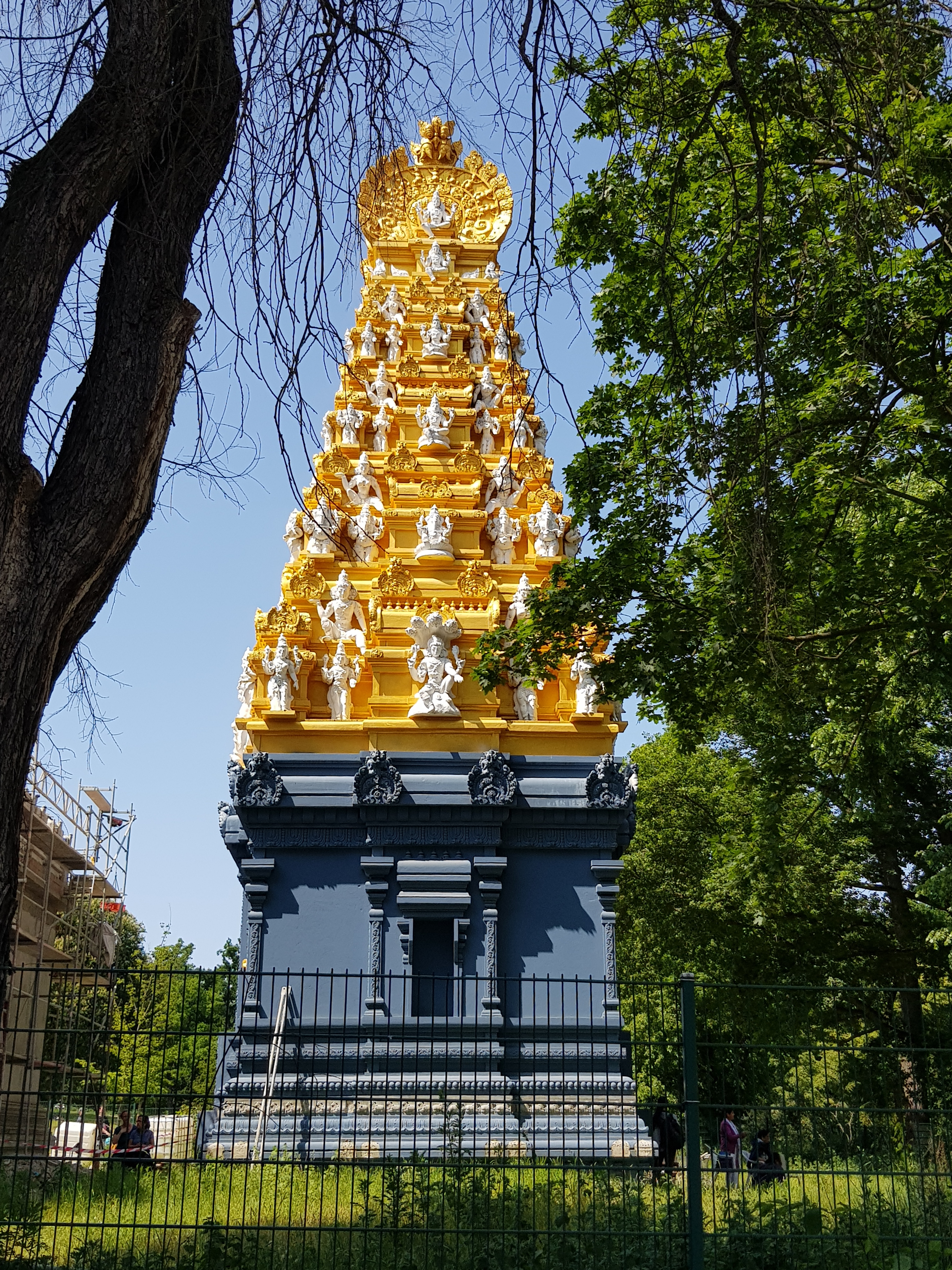
The 17-metre (56 ft) entrance tower of the Sri Ganesha Hindu Temple, 2023.

The borough of Neukölln is home to several thousand Hindus, mainly from India, Sri Lanka and Bangladesh, and especially the number of Indian expats, many of them of Tamil ethnicity, has been rising steadily since the 2022 enactment of the Deutsch-indisches Migrationsabkommen (German-Indian Treaty on Migration). 2025 estimates for the borough of Neukölln range from 6,000 to 30,000 Hindu residents. In order to relieve the mainly Sri Lankan Sri Mayurapathy Murugan Temple in Britz, and to also provide a home for Neukölln's Indian Hindus, the Sri Ganesha Temple at the edge of the Volkspark Hasenheide, the largest Hindu temple in continental Europe, was financed by donations and built over twenty years in the Dravidian style, and consecrated on 7 June 2026.

=== Islam ===
Islam became increasingly established in Neukölln following immigration from Turkey and other Muslim-majority countries during the second half of the 20th century. The quarter is now home to numerous mosques and Islamic organizations representing different religious traditions and national backgrounds. Most congregations are Sunni and were originally established by Turkish Muslims, while others serve Albanian, Bengali, Kurdish, Lebanese and other communities. Most mosques occupy converted association premises (Vereinsheime) rather than purpose-built religious buildings.

Neukölln's Sunni congregations include neighbourhood mosques, larger religious associations and congregations organized around particular ethnic or linguistic communities. Major congregations include the Hamidiye Mosque, the Dar Assalam Mosque and the Zentrum für Religion, Mensch und Gesellschaft, alongside mosques serving Albanian, Bengali and Kurdish Muslims. The Al-Nur Mosque and the Furkan association have been associated with Berlin's Salafi movement by the city's domestic intelligence service.

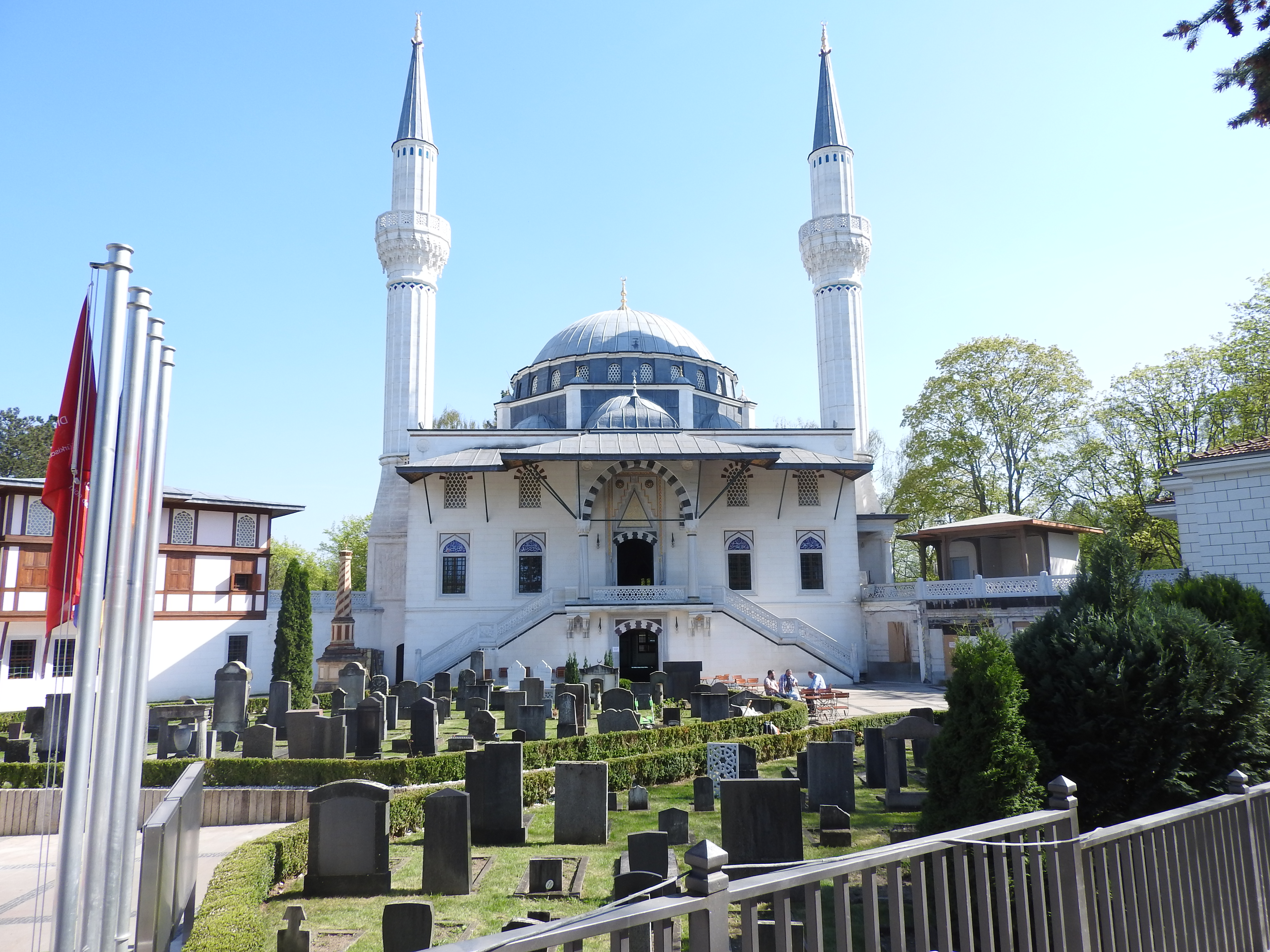
Şehitlik Mosque in Berlin, photographed in 2018.

The quarter's best-known Islamic landmark is the Şehitlik Mosque beside Tempelhofer Feld. Designed by Hilmi Şenalp and completed between 1999 and 2005, the Ottoman Revival building accommodates approximately 1,500 worshippers. It stands within Şehitlik Cemetery, an Islamic burial ground established between 1863 and 1866 for Berlin's Ottoman community. The cemetery succeeded an earlier Ottoman diplomatic burial ground founded near Urbanstraße in 1798.

Neukölln also has established Shia, Alevi and Sufi communities. Shia congregations include Markaz Al-Qaim, Imam Riza and the Al-Mustafa Mosque. Alevi residents are represented by organizations including Sivasli Canlar, while Sufi traditions are practised by groups such as the Tekke-i Kadiriyye Mescidi in Rixdorf.

Muslim organizations in Neukölln also participate in interfaith dialogue and community initiatives. These include the Neuköllner Begegnungsstätte at the Dar Assalam Mosque, the Jewish–Muslim Salaam-Schalom Initiative, cooperation between Protestant congregations and local mosques, and educational partnerships involving the German–Arabic Ibn Khaldun school.

=== Judaism ===
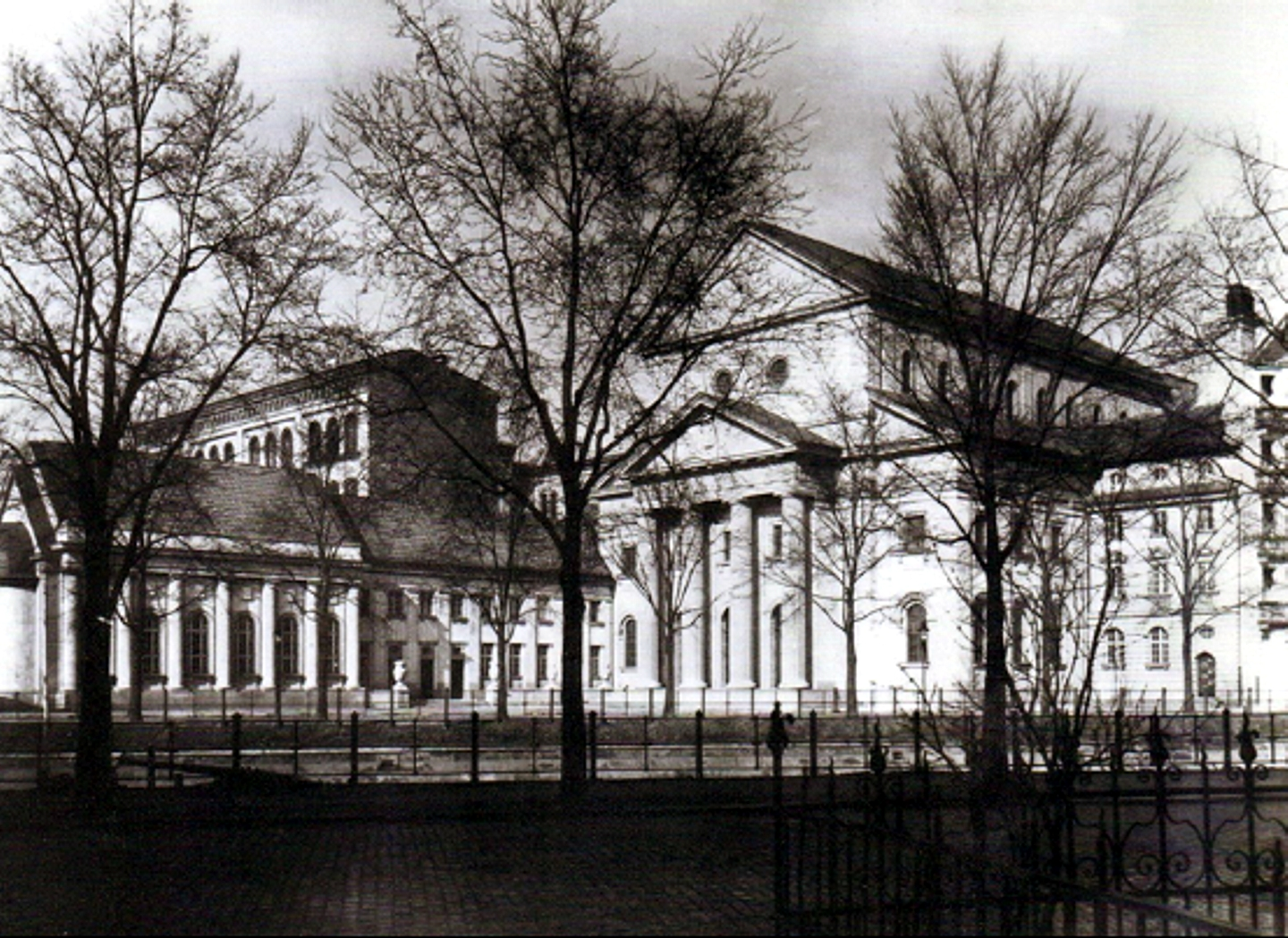
The Fraenkelufer Synagogue complex on the Landwehr Canal, c. 1917.

All Jewish places of worship in Berlin were destroyed or severely damaged during the National Socialist reign over Germany. In Neukölln, the synagogue on Isarstraße (Flughafenkiez) was demolished during the Kristallnacht of 1938, and only a commemorative plaque remains.

There are no plans to reintroduce a new Jewish house of prayer in Neukölln, even though the number of Jewish citizens is rising. However, the Fraenkelufer Synagogue, an important center for Berlin's former Orthodox and now conservative Judaism, still exists. It is situated at the Landwehr Canal near the Reuterkiez just beyond the border to Kreuzberg. Construction to augment the remaining historical building is planned to begin in 2027, which will again elevate it to one of the most important synagogues and Jewish cultural centers of Berlin beside the New Synagoge in Mitte and the Rykestraße Synagogue in Prenzlauer Berg.

Still, the religious and cultural diversity of German society, not least in Berlin, has suffered greatly in the past 90 years, namely from the loss of Jewish culture due to the Shoa and Jewish exodus from Germany. Jewish life cautiously resurged in the 1990s with the immigrating late repatriates from Eastern Europe, and the trend continued with the 21st century influx of young people from all around the world, many of whom come from Israel. However, in 2022 only 1% of Berlin's residents had been Jewish.

=== Protestantism ===
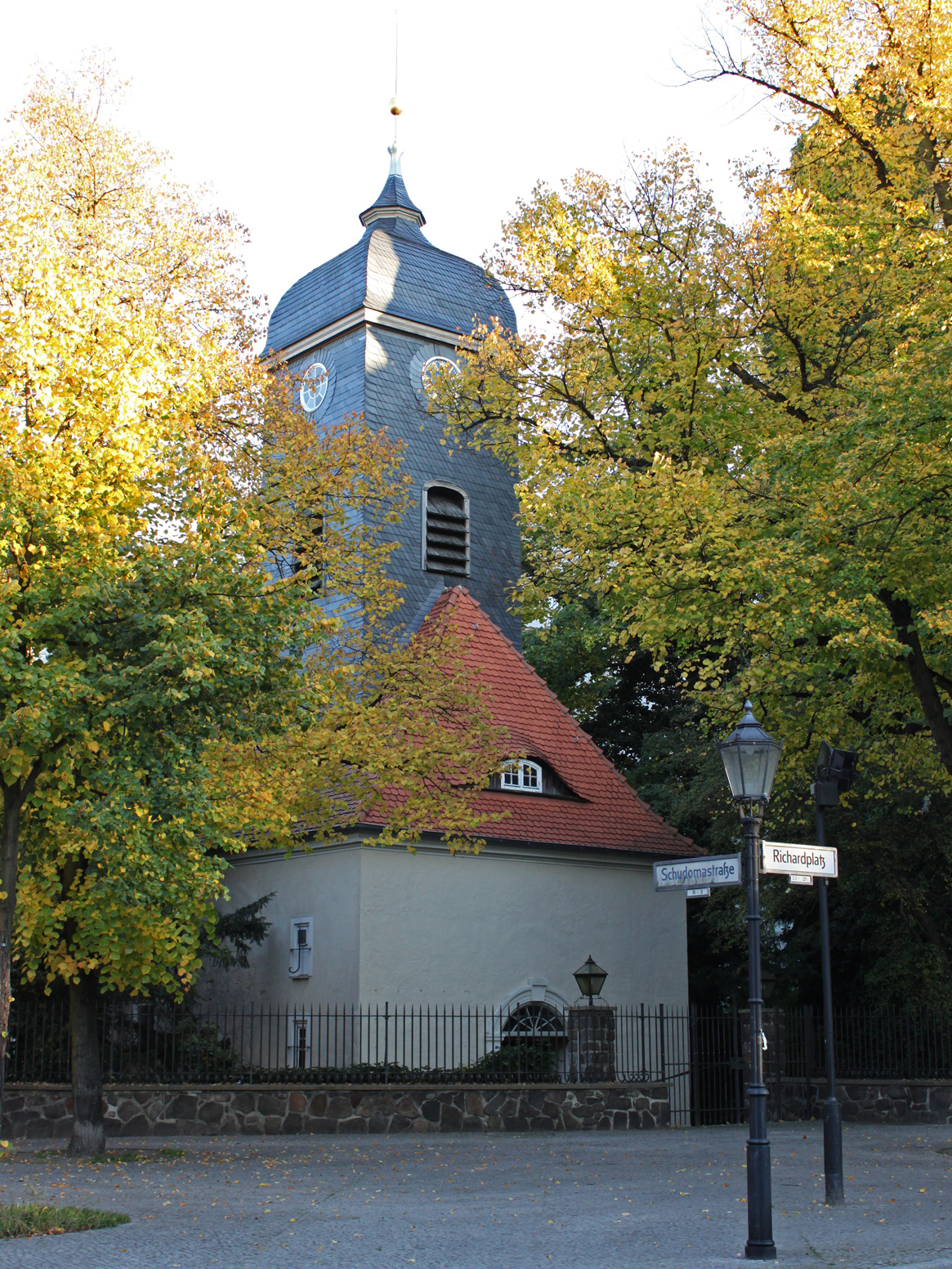
Bethlehem Church in Rixdorf, photographed in 2010.

Protestantism became an important part of Rixdorf's religious life during the eighteenth century through the settlement of Protestant refugees from Bohemia. The settlers included members of the Moravian Church, Lutherans and Reformed Protestants. Their communities were established in Böhmisch-Rixdorf ("Bohemian Rixdorf"), north of the older village of Deutsch-Rixdorf. Protestant congregations remain concentrated in and around Rixdorf, including along Richardstraße and Kirchgasse.

The oldest church used by a Protestant congregation in Neukölln is Bethlehem Church, the historic village chapel of Rixdorf. Originally a Roman Catholic chapel, it was later shared by Catholic and Protestant congregations before becoming a Bohemian Lutheran place of worship. Other Protestant churches were built as Rixdorf expanded during the late nineteenth and early twentieth centuries. These include the Church of Mary Magdalene on Karl-Marx-Straße, Genezareth Church on Herrfurthplatz, Martin Luther Church on Fuldastraße, Nicodemus Church in the Reuterkiez and Philipp Melanchthon Church on Kranoldstraße. Philipp Melanchthon Church was constructed between 1914 and 1916. In 1960, it received two bells from the original Kaiser Wilhelm Memorial Church.

Neukölln also has Protestant congregations outside the mainstream regional church. The Reformed Bethlehem congregation has its parish hall on Richardstraße, while the Moravian congregation uses an oratory and parish hall on Kirchgasse. Other churches accommodate additional Christian communities. Martin Luther Church is also used by a Romanian Orthodox congregation and several international Protestant congregations. Genezareth Church hosts a Pentecostal congregation, while the Church of Mary Magdalene is shared with the Church of the United Brethren in Christ. The Reformed Bethlehem parish hall is also used by the Evangelical Presbyterian Church of Iran and a Baptist congregation.

=== Minority religions ===
Other religions, denominations and belief systems are represented marginally at best, but have found ways to organize, for example at the Buddhist centers on Neckarstraße (Flughafenkiez) or the Yun Hwa Dharma Sah on Nannsenstraße (Reuterkiez), the Turkish Mormon chapel and the Rosicrucian Lectorium Rosicrucianum, both on Rixdorf's Richardstraße, and the Baháʼí prayer rooms on the Sonnenallee.

=== Places of worship ===
Even though the quarter's number of Christians has been steadily decreasing in the past decades (see above), Neukölln has a diverse Christian heritage, on the one hand as a historically Roman Catholic Knights Templar and Knights Hospitaller village, and as the seat of the Holy See's Apostolic Nunciature, and on the other hand as a prominent Protestant center of Germany. Most of the major religions are well represented in Neukölln today. Generally, most of Neukölln's places of worship have converged around the quarter's historical neighborhoods of Reuterkiez, Flughafenstraße, Schillerpromenade and especially Rixdorf.

=== Interfaith dialog ===
Many of Neukölln's interfaith associations have achieved citywide to sometimes national prominence, for example the Islamic ZMRG (see above) or the Neuköllner Begegnungsstätte (NBS, Neukölln Meeting Place) at the Dar Assalam mosque, the Protestant Interkulturelles Zentrum Genezareth (IZG, Intercultural Center Genezareth) on Herrfurthplatz, formerly known as the Treffpunkt Religion und Gesellschaft, the Jewish–Islamic Salaam-Schalom Initiative, the Protestant–Muslim ecumenical working group, run by the Rixdorf parishes and the Gazi Osman Paşa mosque, the Jewish outreach project Schalom Rollberg! on Morusstraße (Rollberg), the Protestant city mission Refugio on Lenaustraße in the Reuterkiez, and a branch of the Mennonite Friedenszentrum (Center for Peace) with their Café Abraham–Ibrahim at the Roman Catholic International Pastoral Center on Kranoldstraße in the Silbersteinkiez.

Secular outreach projects exist as well, like the private German–Arabic language school Ibn Khaldun with four facilities across Neukölln, which also runs a Jewish exchange project together with Hillel Berlin. The prominent Werkstatt Religionen und Weltanschauungen (Working Group for Religions and Worldviews), which was originally part of the transcultural Werkstatt der Kulturen, continues to operate after the latter's closure.

== Culture and notable sights ==
=== Main sights ===
- Neuköllner Oper: opera house that hosts a wide range of performances including musicals, baroque opera, operetta, or experimental music theatre. Famous for its aim to bring elitist culture to a wider audience.
- Stadtbad Neukölln, the local swim hall which consists of antique thermal baths inspired by Greek temples and basilicas.
- Körnerpark: park in neobarock style with fountains, orangerie, exhibition rooms and a cafe, founded 1910.

== Agriculture and livestock farming ==
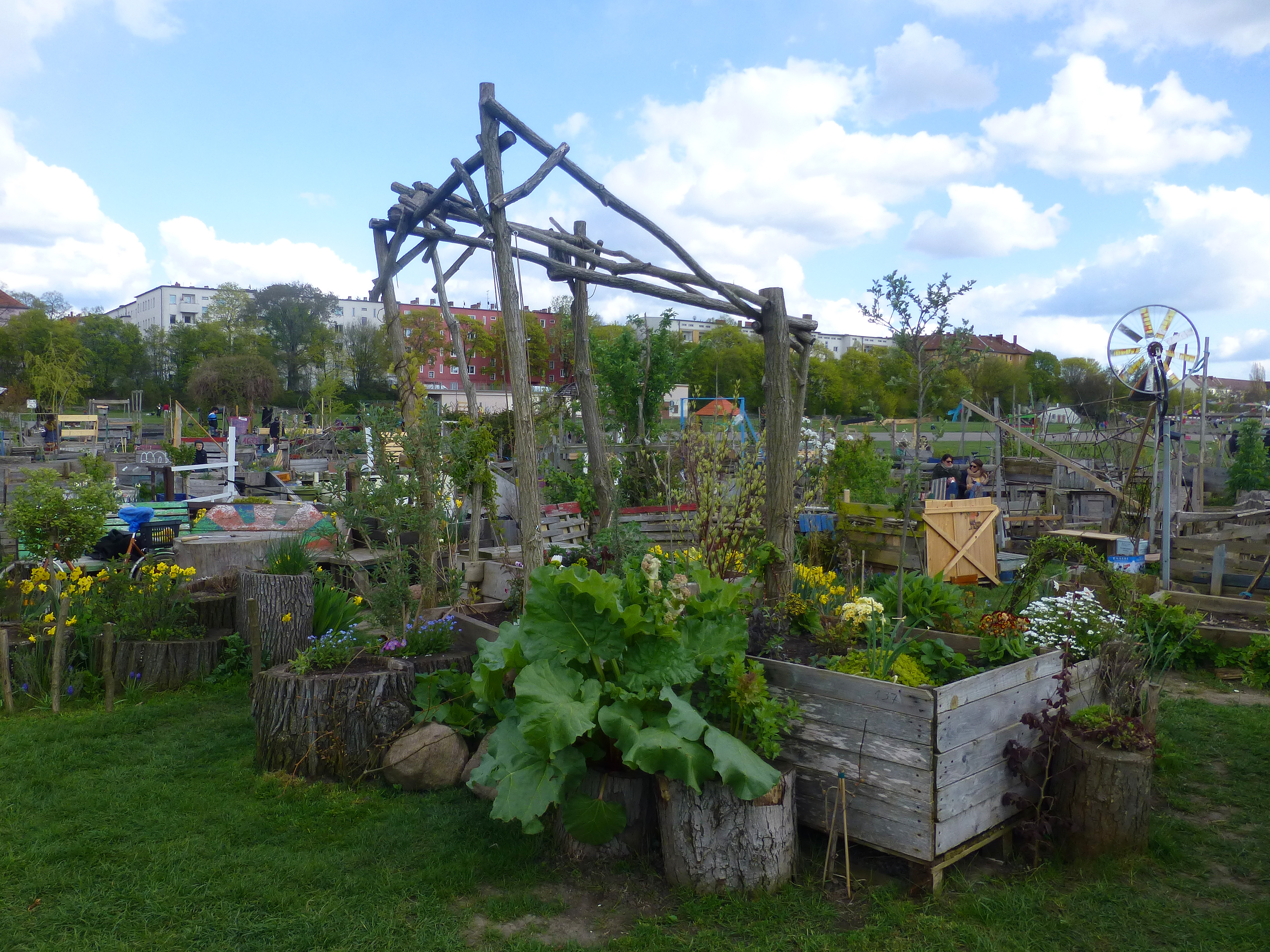
Neighborhood garden, Schillerkiez

The borough of Neukölln has 40 ha (0.400 km^{2}) or 99 acres (0.15 mi^{2}) under cultivation, but only very few areas of the highly urbanized northern quarter of Neukölln are officially designated as agricultural land. Agriculture and livestock farming are usually found on small lots for school and preschool projects or in larger parks. Examples are the urban garden at St. Jacobi cemetery, the academically maintained community garden Allmende-Kontor for urban gardening and cultivation on the Tempelhofer Feld, and the Tierpark Neukölln (animal park) in the Volkspark Hasenheide, which together with the Naturhaus Hasenheide (nature house) also emphasizes farm animals for educational purposes. Urban beekeeping is relatively widespread, for example on the Tempelhofer Feld or in the Lern- und Nachbarschaftsgarten (Educational Neighborhood Garden) between Kottbusser Damm and Hobrechtstraße (Reuterkiez). Furthermore, a permanent grazing herd of one hundred Skudde sheep as well as a couple of Coburg Fox sheep are kept on the Tempelhofer Feld. In most cases, however, the cultural aspect of Neukölln's nature and agriculture is for the purpose of environmental education, managed by the city-wide project Naturstadt Berlin ("environmental city") and the borough's own Koordinierungsstelle Umweltbildung (Office for the Coordination of Environmental Education).

=== Cannabis cultivation ===
Since the 2024 partial legalization of cannabis in Germany, citizens are allowed to grow and cultivate their own cannabis plants, either privately or in special associations called Cannabis Social Clubs (CSCs), which started operating in July of the same year. In Berlin, the city's administration at first failed to create the necessary state authority and framework in time, and passed responsibility to the blindsided boroughs instead, so many CSCs established their farming areas in Brandenburg to avoid Berlin's bureaucratic gridlock. As of 2025, Neukölln has no registered clubs yet. However, the offices of Germany's governing body Dachverband deutscher Cannabis Social Clubs (CSCD) are located on Siegfriedstraße in the Rollbergkiez.

=== Garden allotments ===
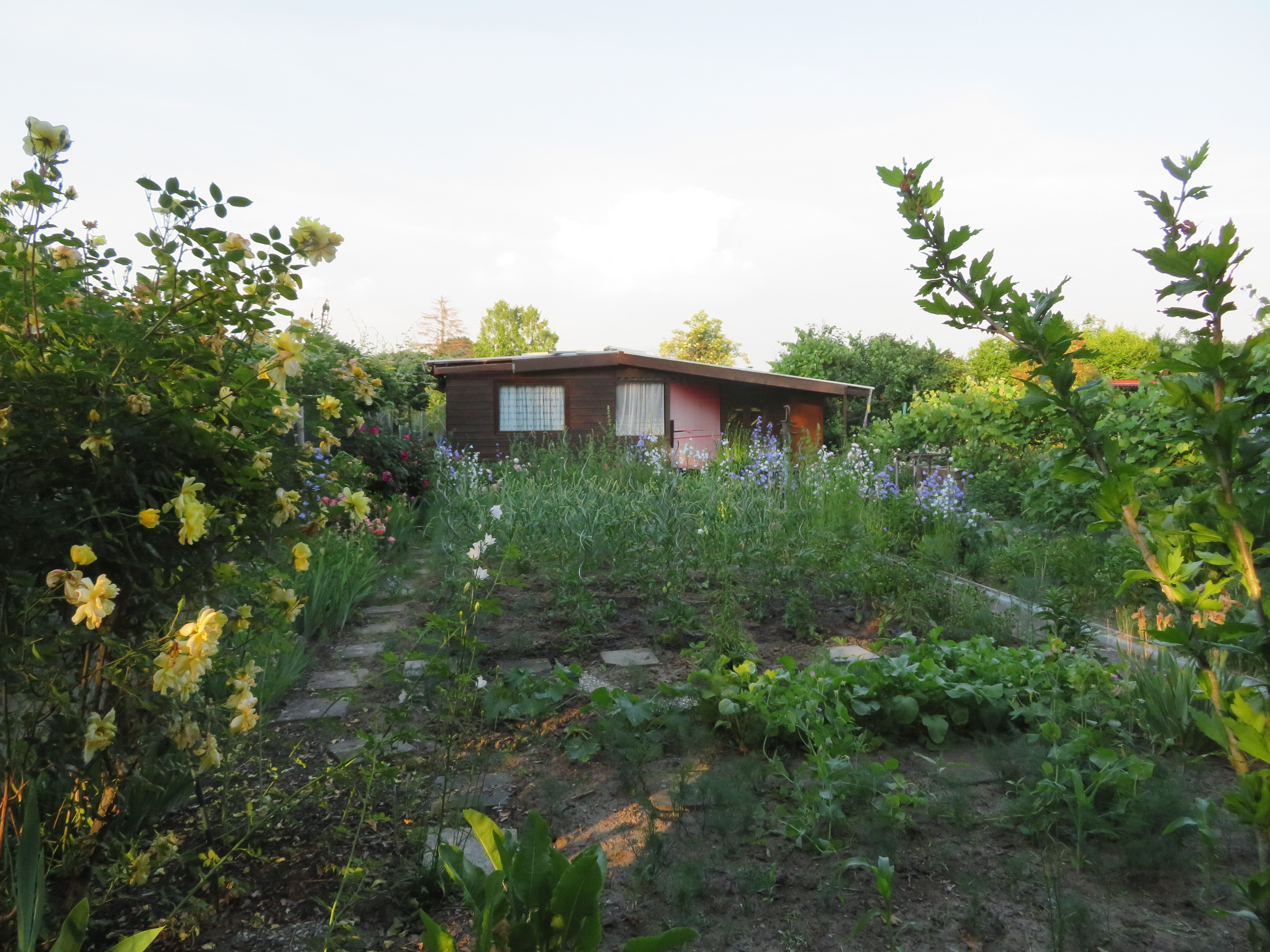
Garden allotment

An often overlooked part of domestic agriculture in Germany, and especially Berlin, is the Schrebergarten or, in its organized form, the Kleingartenanlage (KGA, lit. "small garden site"), which is an agglomeration of privately leased garden allotments. Especially large cities contain wide areas of these KGAs, and Berlin takes the top spot with more than 65,000 allotments—two for every hundred residents. Since these allotments usually contain shacks or small summer houses, the KGAs have occasionally been called the "German shanty towns". The Kleingarten was originally meant as a small private nursery to counter malnutrition in the urban citizenry, but in modern times evolved into a place for local recreation. In recent years, increased ecological awareness has reintroduced the agricultural aspect, and a new generation of young people have been rediscovering the Kleingarten, especially with cultivation in mind. Neukölln has large swaths of KGAs, most noteworthy the areas on both sides of the former border to East Berlin. Smaller ones have also formed in the west near the Tempelhofer Feld, and even in the central urban locations of Neukölln, for example near Reuterplatz, north of Sonnenallee and south of the Ringbahn.

=== Wineries, distilleries and breweries ===
Since 13 April 1973, winegrowing had been part of Neukölln's culture in the Schulgarten Dammweg south of the Weiße Siedlung, supported by the Weinbruderschaft der Pfalz (Wine Fraternity of the Palatinate), but the business was forced to move to the Britz quarter in 2019. The wine itself (Rixdorfer Weinmeister) is still auctioned off at the annual Rixdorf Christmas market (see below). Neukölln has only a few small distilleries, for example the Ratzeputz on Weserstraße (Reuterkiez), which sells its own schnaps.

Like many other places around the world, Neukölln has also witnessed the rise of small breweries and entrepreneurial craft brewing in recent years. The Sudhaus of the former Kindle brewery now also houses the Privatbrauerei am Rollberg, offering guided tours, and includes a taproom. Other breweries have formed all over Neukölln, for example the Lager Lager brewery and taproom on Pflügerstraße (Reuterkiez), and the Berliner Berg Brauerei in Neukölln's north-east corner on Treptower Straße (Rixdorf), whose brewery comes with a beer garden, with their official taproom Bergschloss located on Kopfstraße (Rollberg). Far more than taprooms are offered by the breweries Suuud on the street Hasenheide, which is combined with an international restaurant, live music and a beer garden, and the Brauhaus Neulich on Selchower Straße (Schillerkiez), a rustic tavern with occasional live music performances.

== Markets ==
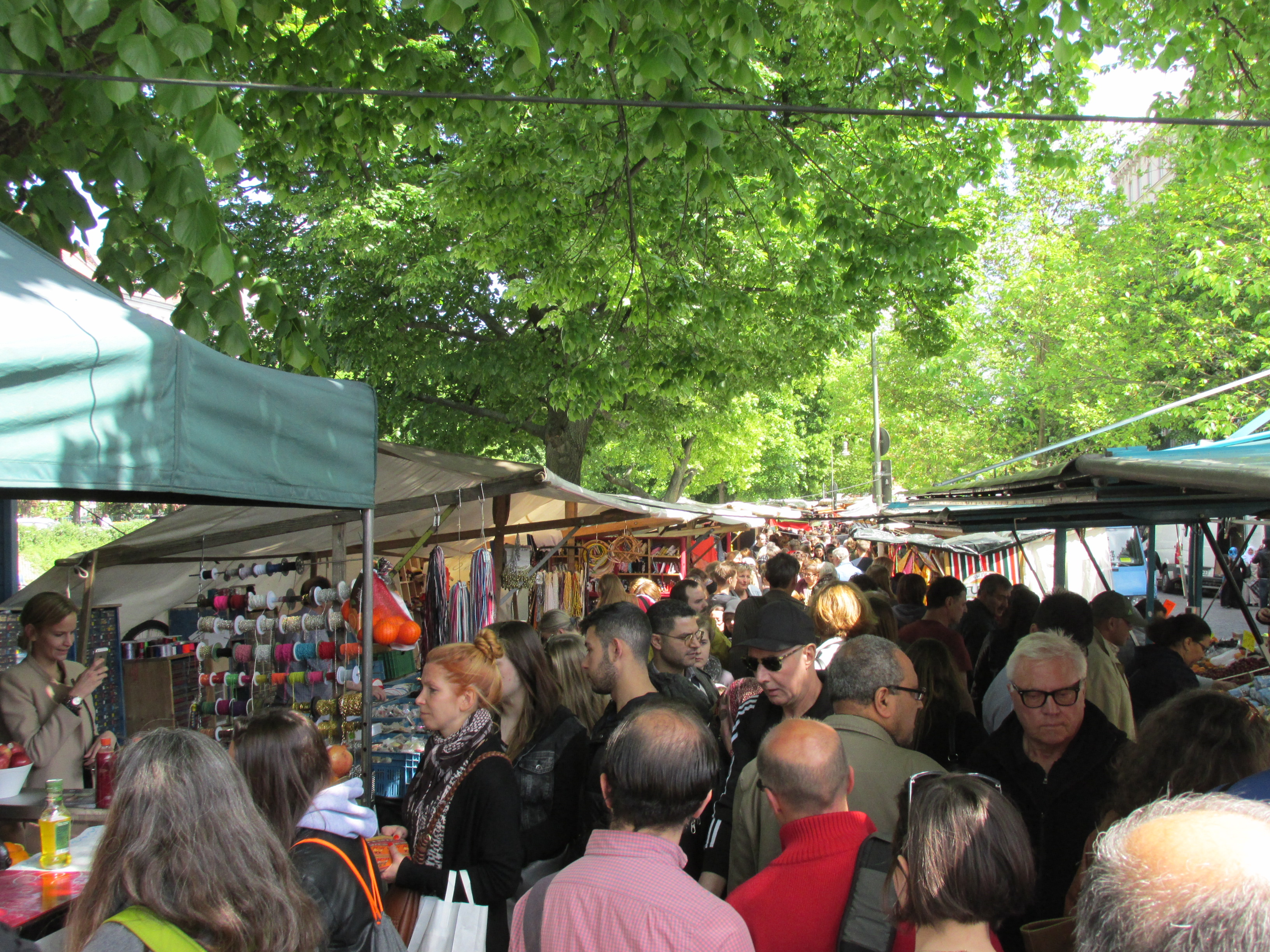
Türkenmarkt on Maybbachufer

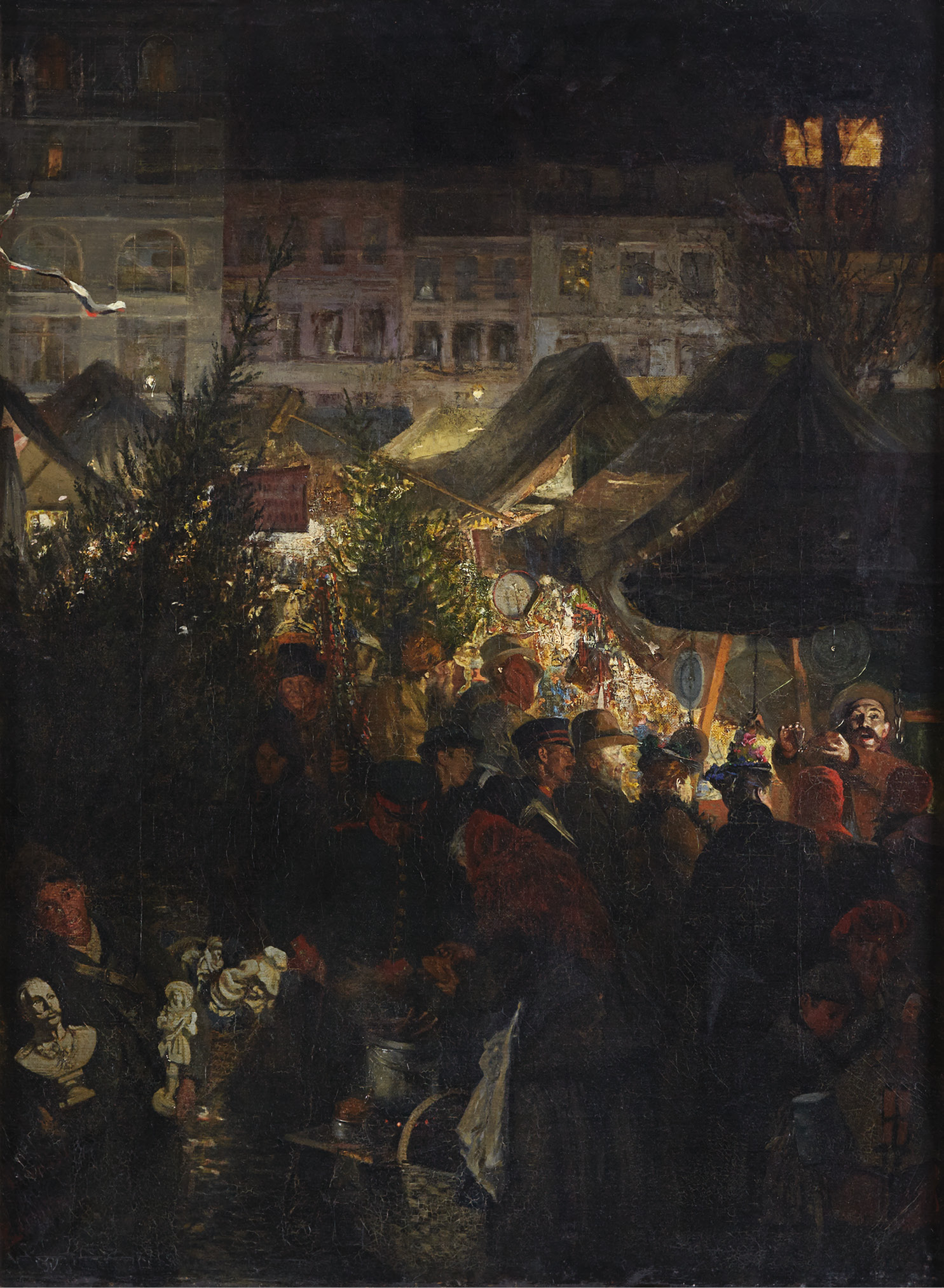
Rixdorf Christmas market, ca. 1900

=== Street markets ===
Unlike Berlin, the former city of Neukölln never had a traditional market hall, and the closest one still in operation is the Markthalle IX in Kreuzberg nearby. However, Neukölln has many popular street markets instead. The Maybachufer (Reuterkiez) along the Landwehr Canal has four market days, hosting the famous weekly general market on Tuesdays and Fridays, colloquially called Türkenmarkt ("Turks' market"), and a smaller handicraft market on Saturdays (Neuköllner Stoff), both of them situated just east of the Kottbusser Brücke, as well as the flea market Nowkoelln Flowmarkt east of the Hobrechtbrücke, usually hosted from March to October every second Sunday.

Rixdorf has two weekly market days, with a general market hosted on Wednesdays and Saturdays on the Karl-Marx-Platz near the historical center around Richardplatz. A general weekly market for local and regional produce is the Dicke Linda ("Fat Linda"), which is hosted every Saturday on the Kranoldplatz in the Silbersteinkiez. The Kranoldplatz is also the location of a small flea market, hosted on the second Sunday of every month from March to November. A smaller, but popular mixed market is the Schillermarkt, which is hosted every Saturday on the Herrfurthplatz in the Schillerkiez. The Hermannplatz hosts general markets on the plaza's central island Monday through Friday in varying sizes.

The association Berliner Fahrradmarkt (BFM) conducts regular bicycle markets across four locations in Berlin, two of them in Neukölln. Twice every month, the market is hosted in the Rütlistraße (Reuterkiez) and on the Herrfurthplatz (Schillerpromenade) respectively.

==== Christmas markets ====
The annual Christmas market in Rixdorf takes place at the Richardplatz on the weekend of the second advent Sunday. The quarter's Christmas market was resurrected in December 1974 after a long hiatus following the historical Rixdorf Christmas market, which had been conducted since at least the 19th century. A modern Christmas market is hosted at the venue Klunkerkranich, the popular rooftop bar of the Neukölln Arcaden. In addition, some of the regular markets and flea markets will usually expand into Christmas markets in December, for example the Nowkoelln Xmas Flowmarkt on the Maybachufer and the Dicke Linda on Kranoldplatz. Since 2024, the German Christmas shopping event Holy Shit Shopping has been organized at the CANK, a pop-up event venue in a former mall in Rixdorf.

== Cinemas ==
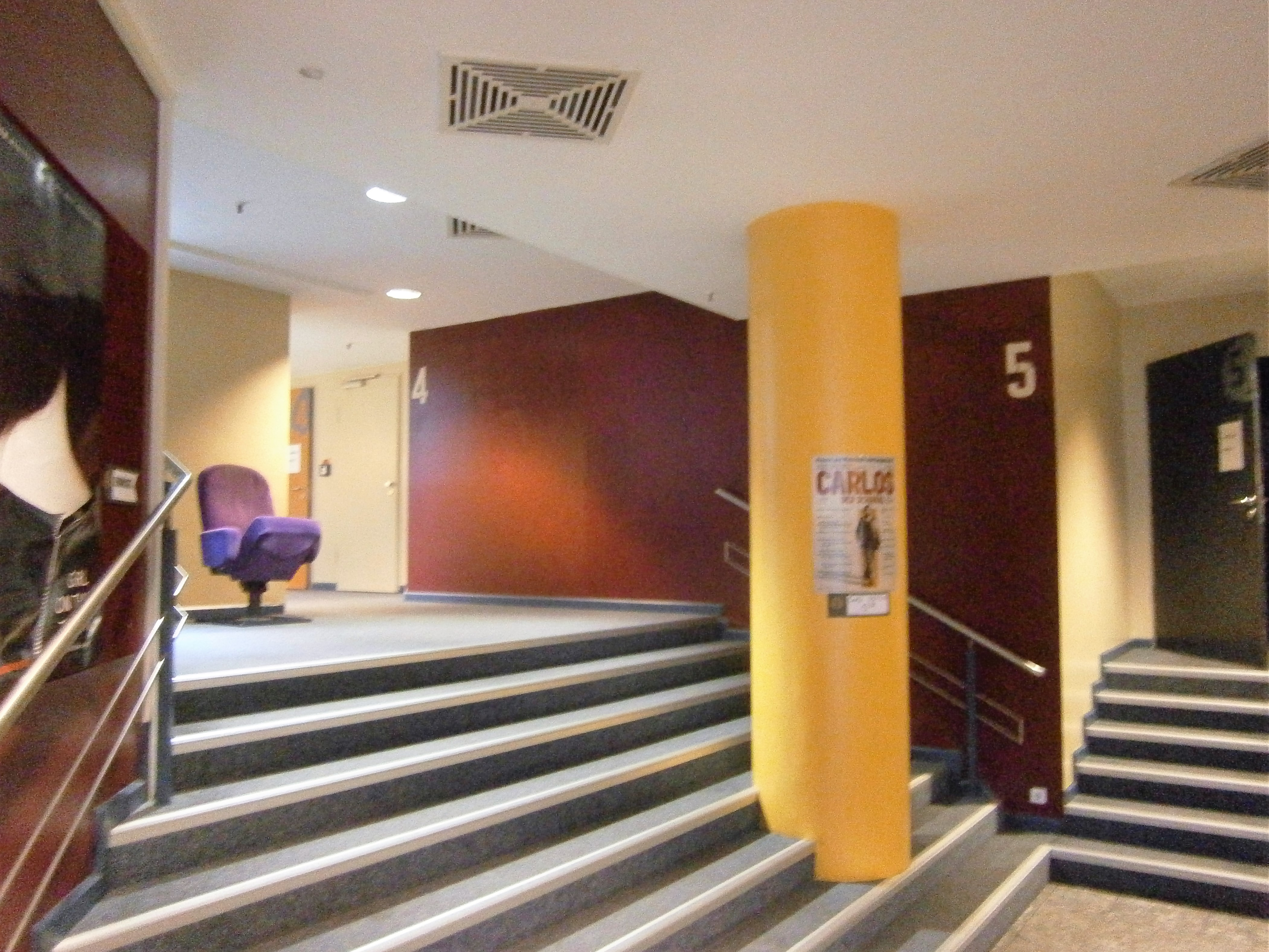
Rollberg Kinos

Neukölln has one modern multiplex movie theater, the Cineplex Neukölln in the Neukölln Arcaden. The shopping mall was constructed in the late 1990s as the Forum Neukölln, and the multiplex with nine auditoriums opened its doors in the year 2000. It is operated by UCI Cinemas and the German Cineplex group.

The Yorck Cinema Group, an association of formerly independent and often historical movie theaters, operates several cinemas in Berlin, three of them in Neukölln, the single-auditorium Neues Off, originally a 1919 vaudeville theater, which became a movie theater in 1926, renovated in the 1950s and fully restored in the 1990s, the Passage with four auditoriums, a movie theater since its 1910 inception, but extensively renovated at the end of the 1980s, and the Rollberg Kinos with five auditoriums, which opened in 1996 next to the site of the Mercedes-Palast, which since 1927 had housed Europe's largest movie theater, later destroyed at the end of World War II. (Note: The Metro and (since 1953) Europa-Palast with the Roxy studio auditorium had been smaller successors of the Mercedes-Palast from 1945 until their final closing in 1969; see also Liste der Kinos im Berliner Bezirk Neukölln for an overview of Neukölln's current and former film theaters.)

Neukölln still has two truly independent movie theaters, which mainly rely on arthouse films. Both locations offer a blend of cinema, café and bar. The single-auditorium Il Kino in the Reuterkiez opened its doors in 2014 as a branch of the Roman movie theater of the same name. The newest addition to Neukölln's family of cinemas is the Wolf in the Weserkiez, which opened its two auditoriums in 2017, together with the Wolf Studio, a modular location for screenings, exhibitions and workshops.

On the Kreuzberg side of the Kottbusser Damm, just outside of the Reuterkiez, lies the Moviemento, which has three auditoriums. It opened as a small bioscope on 29 March 1907, and has been a movie theater ever since, which makes it the oldest continuously operating cinema of Germany, now mainly showing arthouse and documentary films, while also being a major player in Berlin's independent film festival scene.

Film screenings in other locations are commonplace, either officially like the outdoor movie theater in the Volkspark Hasenheide, which opens its gates in the summer months, or at more informal gatherings, such as silent film screenings with live music accompaniment in the bar Froschkoenig.

In recent years, theater owners have adapted to the international citizenry, and all of Neukölln's movie theaters screen many of their movies in their original languages rather than German dubs, sometimes with German subtitles. In particular, the Cineplex Neukölln specializes in original Turkish movies.

== Film festivals ==
Beside the Berlin International Film Festival (Berlinale), more than a hundred independent film festivals are hosted in Berlin annually, many of them with venues in Neukölln or at the Moviemento theater on the border to Kreuzberg. The interfilm short film festival including the KUKI festival for young filmmakers is also screening at the Rollberg Kino. Most of Berlin's other independent festivals usually have their Neukölln screenings only at the quarter's independent movie theaters, namely the Moviemento, Il Kino and Wolf. Among the more important festivals are Achtung Berlin, one of the more prominent independent festivals highlighting film works by young and aspiring filmmakers, the XPOSED queer film festival, the Pornfilmfestival Berlin, the KinoKabaret short film festival, the Female Filmmakers Festival, as well as Berlin's Jewish and Arabic film festivals. Furthermore, important films from the previous Berlinale usually receive second showings in the Hasenheide open air movie theater during the summer season.

== Architecture ==
Neukölln's built environment reflects more than six centuries of development, from the surviving late medieval and early modern structures of historic Rixdorf to the dense Gründerzeit neighbourhoods created during the area's rapid urbanisation in the late 19th and early 20th centuries. The older centre around Richardplatz retains buildings associated with the former Bohemian settlement, while much of northern Neukölln forms part of Berlin's Wilhelmine Ring of historicist apartment blocks.

Rapid growth around the turn of the 20th century produced many of Neukölln's prominent civic, commercial and industrial buildings. Municipal architect Reinhold Kiehl played an important role in this period, while architects including Bruno Taut, Max Taut and Ludwig Mies van der Rohe were also associated with architectural development in the area. Later construction includes early modernist housing, post-war public housing estates, industrial redevelopment and contemporary projects such as the Estrel Tower.

== Nightlife ==
=== Clubs ===
Berlin's club scene, while famous around the world, was mostly dominated by the establishments that formed in vacant residential and industrial lots in the inner-city neighborhoods of former East Berlin after the fall of the Berlin Wall during the nonregulated, often ephemeral and highly diverse subcultural boom of the 1990s and early 2000s. Since the 2010s, the successors in Berlin's nightlife scene became more professional, but have mainly used the same urban areas for their venues. Similar open spaces were at first unavailable in Berlin's western boroughs, whose nightlife remained in limbo for almost two decades, because it was still relying on long-established clubs and discotheques of the Cold War era.

The status quo slowly changed in the 21st century, as more and more young creatives moved to Berlin. Since then, western industrial lots have been repurposed in higher numbers, and even Neukölln has seen its share of prominent clubs that have already come and gone, for example the Loftus Hall, its successor Christa Kupfer, the Griessmühle, the 1990s-style underground club Loophole, and the SchwuZ, Germany's oldest queer club from 1977 until its temporary closure in 2025. Nevertheless, the quarter's club life is still not dominated by large venues or local centers of attraction.

However, Berlin has always had smaller clubs and bars with (sometimes tiny) dancefloors, which were initially created out of necessity due to the finite space in the urbanized enclave of former West Berlin, but have since become a staple of Berlin's nightlife. In this respect, Neukölln is no exception and still offers many clubs, especially in the northern neighborhoods closer to the gravitational centers of Berlin's nightlife in Friedrichshain, Mitte and Kreuzberg, for example Sameheads and the Arkaoda in Rixdorf. Gentrification further south has also spawned clubs in the Schillerkiez like the Promenaden-Eck on Schillerpromenade with two dancefloors.

=== Bars ===
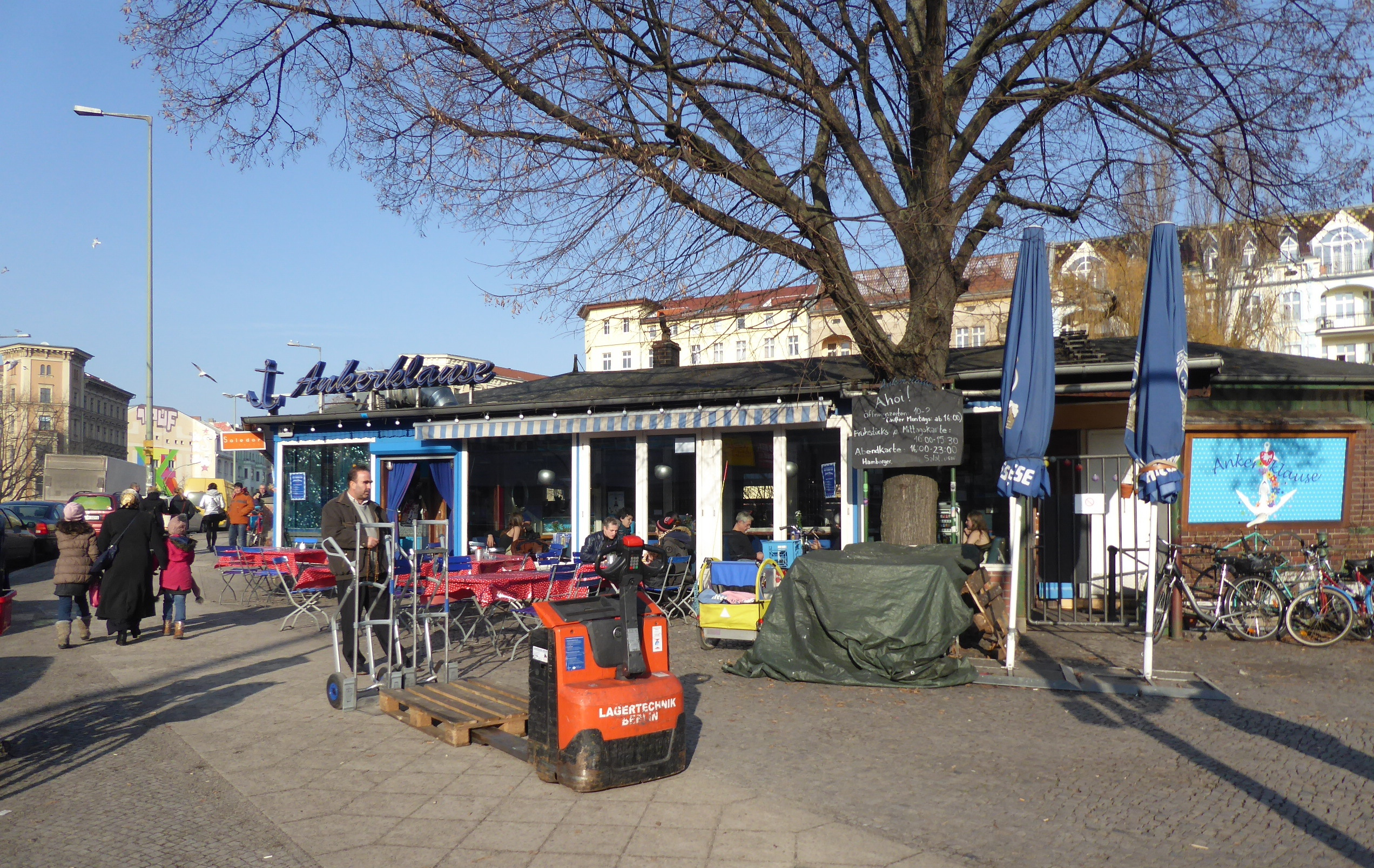
Ankerklause

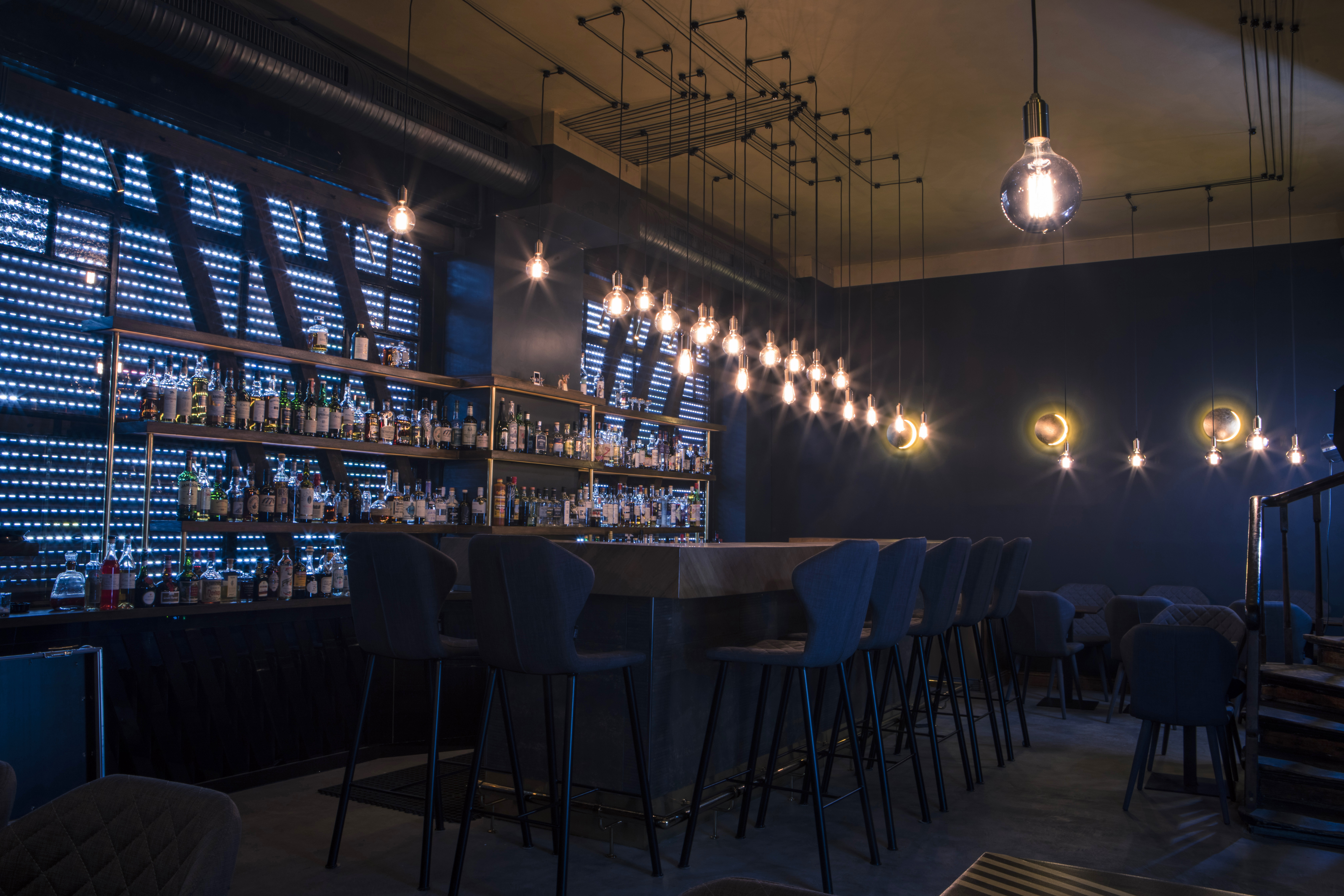
Velvet Bar

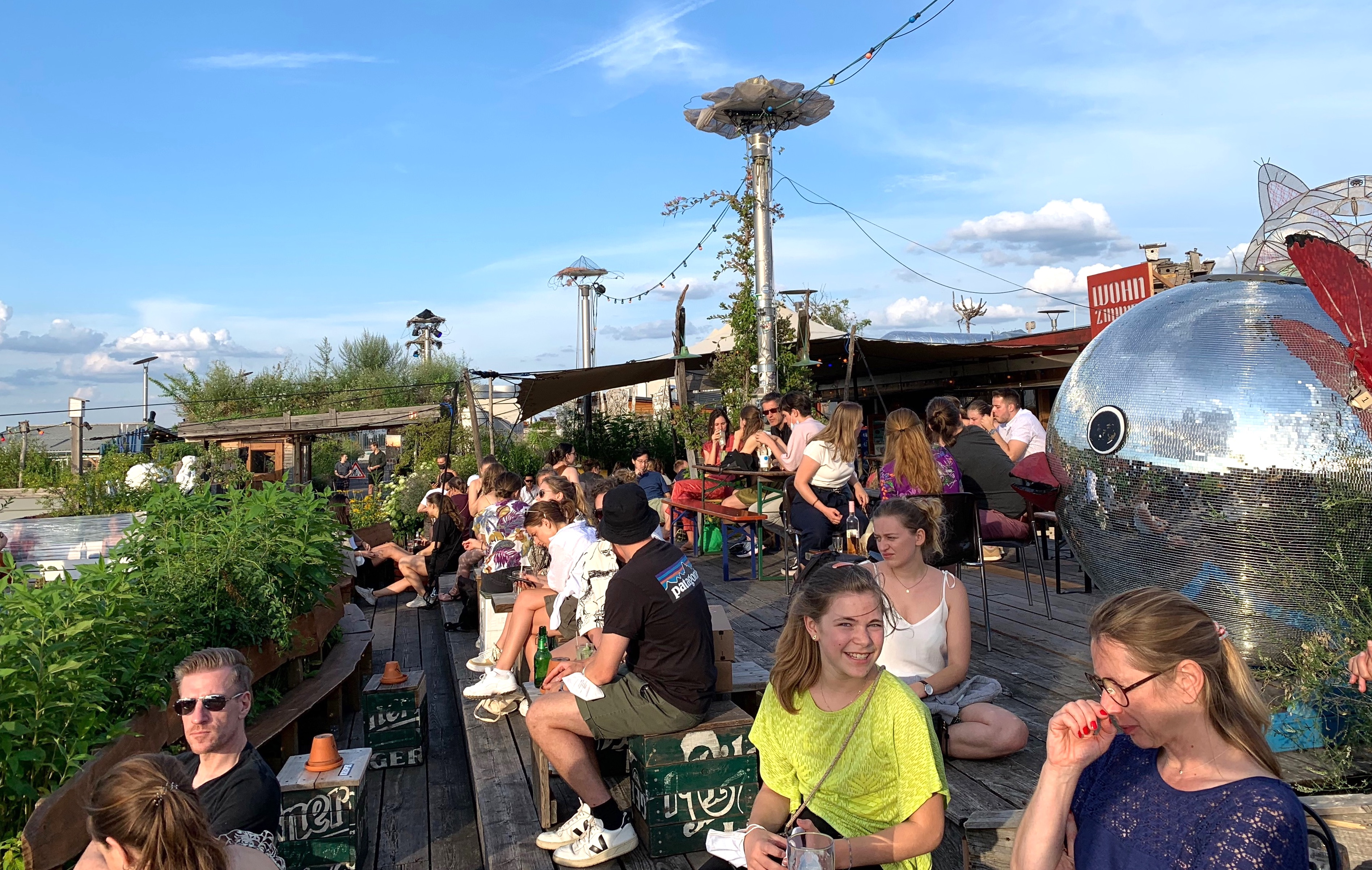
Klunkerkranich

In Berlin, the city once called the Bar des Planeten ("bar of the planet"), bars and pubs are a dime a dozen. While for some locals, the spätis can work as the be all and end all, most visitors only frequent them for pre-gaming and eventually prefer a club, a corner pub, whether modern or traditional, or one of Neukölln's many bars, whether with live music, a dancefloor, dining options, or as a traditional cocktail lounge or wine bar. The range in Neukölln are diverse, like the Ankerklause, one of Neukölln's long-lasting pubs in the style of a harbor tavern on the border to Kreuzberg at the Landwehr Canal, or in the quarter's center like the Klunkerkranich, a popular rooftop bar atop the Neukölln Arcaden on Karl-Marx-Straße (Flughafenkiez). The main areas for the widest variety of bars with the most Rixdorfian torchbearers are found in the northern neighborhoods like the Donau-, Weser-, Reuter- and Friedelkiez. The Weserkiez offers many standouts like the Thelonius Bar, Jaja Naked Wine, the Beuster Bar and Wax On, but in the end there are effectively too many to count. Other central neighborhoods seldomly fall behind, like Alt-Rixdorf with Velvet, Drei Flaschen and Herr Lindemann, which operates at the location of Rixdorf's very first village tavern. Since the gentrifying wave in Neukölln has slowly been moving south, other neighborhoods like the Donaukiez, Flughafenstraße and Schillerpromenade are now experiencing the same explosion of nightlife.

=== Beer gardens ===
Densely packed Neukölln has little open spaces left, and many historical places like the Neue Welt garden were closed and redeveloped, so beer gardens are far and few between. However, most cafés, restaurants, bars and pubs extend their patron space outside as early in the year as possible, and Berlin's usually broad sidewalks provide enough room for this specific part of the city's street life. Some bars even utilize the backyards for this purpose, like the TiER on Weserstraße. Still, some beer gardens do exist, for example the Klunkerkranich terrace, the Tempelgarten on the Tempelhofer Feld, the Zosse in Rixdorf, and the outdoor areas of two breweries, Berliner Berg Brauerei in the Harzer Kiez, and the Suuud near Hasenheide.

=== Corner pubs ===
The Altberliner Eckkneipe (old Berlin corner pub) used to be one of the mainstays of Berlin nightlife, and the historical tavern Rollkrug near Hermannplatz, originally founded in the early 16th century, was doubtlessly the big bang for Neukölln's corner pub scene. To save these traditional establishments from extinction, the Berlin administration even went so far as to effectively exempt most of them from the city's non-smoking rules. (Note: This was achieved in 2009 i.a. by exempting pubs and bars with patron space of less than 75 square meters, and by allowing separated enclosed lounges; "Nichtraucherschutz in der Berliner Gastronomie", Landessuchtbeauftragte Berlin.) Overall, Neukölln still has a lot of these traditional pubs to offer, but in the course of gentrification, many of them were replaced by restaurants, cafés or stores. Especially in the Reuterkiez, traditional corner pubs suddenly became hard to find, though some managed to survive, either still run in their traditional guise like the Lenau-Stuben on Hobrechtstraße, or continued under new management, for example Zum Böhmischen Dorf on Sanderstraße, the Mondhügel Bar on Bürknerstraße, Goldberg on Pflügerstraße, or Ä on Wesertraße. However, in other less gentrified neighborhoods of Neukölln, corner pubs are still prevalent, like the traditional Bäreneck on Hermannstraße, but modern iterations like the Trude Ruth und Goldammer on Flughafenstraße can also be found.

== Notable people ==
Neukölln has been home to or associated with numerous notable figures in politics, the arts, science, architecture, sport, and public life. Among them are architectural sculptor Lee Lawrie, actor Horst Buchholz, jurist Jutta Limbach, philosopher Susan Neiman, footballer Antonio Rüdiger, and artist Lena Braun. The locality has also been associated with historical figures including Bruno Bauer, Wilhelm Voigt, Rosa Luxemburg, and Karl Liebknecht. A more comprehensive list is available at Notable people from Neukölln.

== Awards and international relations ==
=== Neukölln as part of the borough Neukölln ===
- has been a Municipality of Europe since joining the Council of European Municipalities and Regions as a cooperative member on 1 April 1967;
- was awarded the Council of Europe's Europe Prize in 1987 for outstanding commitment to European integration before the fall of the Berlin Wall;
- was awarded as an Ort der Vielfalt ("place of diversity") by the federal government on 23 September 2008;
- is a Pilot City of the Intercultural Cities Programme, also known as the International ICC Programme, organized by the Council of Europe together with the European Commission; (Note: "Berlin-Neukölln represents one of the few cases within the Intercultural cities programme, in which membership is not associated with a city as such, but with a part of it, i.e. with a neighbourhood, or rather in administrative terms, with a district. This has to do with the complex and eventful history of Berlin, as well as with the important political and administrative changes it has gone through as from the end of World War II, in 1945." in: "Berlin-Neukölln: Intercultural Profile", Council of Europe, 27 October 2011.)

Neukölln as part of the borough Neukölln maintains relationships with several German and international twin or partner cities, municipalities or communes:

- Anderlecht, Belgium (1955)
- Bat Yam, near Tel Aviv, Israel (1978)
- Boulogne-Billancourt, near Paris, France (1955)
- Çiğli, İzmir, Turkey (2005)
- Cologne, Germany (1967)
- (England) Hammersmith and Fulham, London, United Kingdom (1955)
- Leonberg, Germany (1970)
- Marino, near Rome, Lazio, Italy (1980)
- Pavlovsk-Pushkin, Saint Petersburg, Russia (1991)
- Prague 5 (Smíchov), Prague, Czech Republic (2005)
- Ústí nad Orlicí, Czech Republic (1989)
- Wetzlar, Germany (1959)
- Zaanstad, near Amsterdam, Netherlands (1955)

=== Neukölln as part of Berlin ===
Neukölln as part of Berlin maintains relationships with several international twin or partner cities: (Note: "Städtepartnerschaften". Der Regierende Bürgermeister / Staatskanzlei. 2024. The latest partner city of Berlin is Kyiv, Ukraine ("Neue Städtepartnerschaft mit Kyiv: Vitali Klitschko in Berlin", berlin.de – Das offizielle Hauptstadtportal, Berlin, 11 September 2023); Kyiv and Paris are not twin cities of Berlin.)

- Beijing, China
- Brussels, Belgium
- Budapest, Hungary
- Buenos Aires, Argentina
- Istanbul, Turkey
- Jakarta, Indonesia
- Kyiv, Ukraine
- London, United Kingdom
- Los Angeles, United States
- Madrid, Spain
- Mexico City, Mexico
- Moscow, Russia (Note: Inactive as of 2026 due to the Russo-Ukrainian war; "Städtepartnerschaft Moskau", Der Regierende Bürgermeister (Senatskanzlei), Berlin 2026.)
- Paris, France
- Prague, Czech Republic
- Tashkent, Uzbekistan
- Tel Aviv-Yafo, Israel
- Tokyo, Japan
- Warsaw, Poland
- Windhoek, Namibia

== Rixdorf and Neukölln in media and popular culture ==
=== Literature ===
As an urban hotspot and important quarter of Berlin, Neukölln has always been the focus of many nonfiction books and academic works in the fields of history, education, social and political sciences. A few prominent natives and residents of Neukölln received biographies, such as architect Reinhold Kiehl and actor Horst Buchholz, or have written memoirs, for example actor Inge Meysel or Neukölln's integration commissioner Güner Balcı with Heimatland (2025). Many consumer nonfiction books about Neukölln exist as well. Notable examples are In den Gangs von Neukölln – Das Leben des Yehya E. (2014) by Christian Stahl, and the satirical Gebrauchsanweisung für Neukölln (1988) by Johannes Groschupf, which he wrote as a student under the pseudonym Olga O'Groschen, while the most popular book to this date has been the critical Neukölln ist überall (2012) by former borough mayor Heinz Buschkowsky.

In fiction, several authors have written about or set their stories in Neukölln, for example Käsebier takes Berlin (Käsebier erobert den Kurfürstendamm, 1932) by Gabriele Tergit, Katharina oder Die Existenzverpflichtung (1992) by Iris Hanika, Hinterhofhelden (2009) by Johannes Groschupf, Hund, Wolf, Schakal (2022) by Behzad Karim Khani, Allegro Pastel (Allegro Pastell, 2020) by Leif Randt, the semi-autobiographical Die halbe Stadt, die es nicht mehr gibt (2012) by Ulrike Sterblich, Jesus von Neukölln (2022) by Wolfgang Priewe, or the children's book Nelly und die Berlinchen – Die Schatzsuche (2019) by Neukölln author Karin Beese. Over the decades, urban lyricists have written many poems about Rixdorf or Neukölln, for example Ede Petermann aus Rixdorf singt in der Verbannung by Otto Julius Bierbaum, published in Ausgewählte Gedichte (1921). The alternative literary artist collective around Uwe Bremer chose the name Werkstatt Rixdorfer Drucke, but in fact operated from a squat on Oranienstraße in Kreuzberg.

=== Theater and stage ===
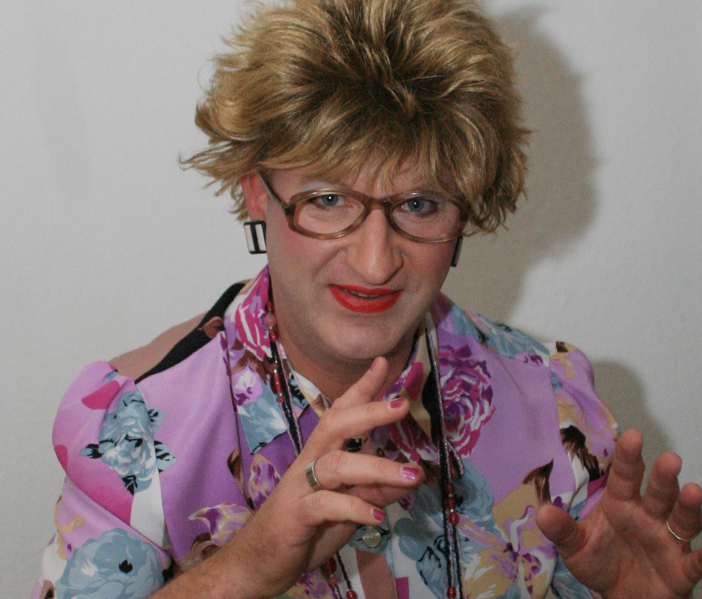
Ades Zabel as Edith Schröder

Horst Pillau wrote the comedy play Der Kaiser von Neukölln, which premiered in 1987 at the Hansa Theater. Since 1980, Ades Zabel has created several musicals, plays and stage performances around the long-term unemployed Neukölln character Edith Schröder, for example Tatort Neukölln and Einfach Edith! 25 Jahre Edith Schröder. Kurt Krömer, himself a Neukölln native, has regularly emphasized the quarter in his stand-up comedy and other works, for example Pimp my Ghetto (2010) in support of the Körnerkiez. Neukölln author Abdullah Eryilmaz has written monodramatic works like Der Pfarrer von Neukölln (The Priest of Neukölln). Commissioned by theater manager and Neukölln resident Matthias Lilienthal for the inauguration of the new Hebbel am Ufer theater company, choreographer Constanza Macras and her dance ensemble Dorky Park produced the dance theater play Scratch Neukölln, which premiered in 2003 at the Hebbel-Theater.

=== Film and television ===
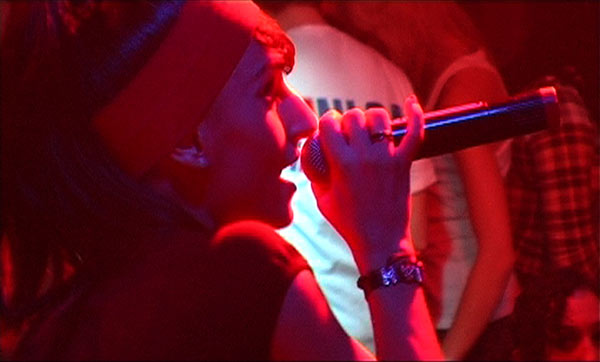
Neukölln Unlimited (2010)

External videos
- Bilderbuch 30 – Berlin-Neukölln (documentary, Eva Demmler & Axel Friedrich, RBB, 2024, 44m)
- Neukölln wie es einmal war (documentary, Svenja Weber, RBB, 2024, 89m)

Neukölln has been a favored location for national and international film and television productions, from German blockbusters like Fack ju Göhte (2013) by Bora Dağtekin to American reality TV shows, (Note: Neukölln was the sixth leg's final pit stop in the 32nd season (2020) of the reality competition TV show The Amazing Race by Elise Doganieri and Bertram van Munster; Sammi Turano, "The Amazing Race Recap for 11/18/2020: Double Legs", TV Grapevine, 18 November 2020 (archived).) as well as special effects work for many Babelsberg productions, most notably by Simon Weisse's Prop & Model Maker Berlin, which have worked on films by the Wachowskis or Wes Anderson, and on TV series like Homeland. Some film works, however, have focused primarily on Neukölln, either as a cultural setting or as an integral part of the narrative, often treating the quarter or borough as a perceived hotspot for the precariat, criminal gangs and alternative concepts of living. (Note: An early and now world-famous motion picture dealing with Neukölln in such a way, is the 1981 biographical drama Christiane F. (Christiane F. – Wir Kinder vom Bahnhof Zoo) by Uli Edel, Herman Weigel and Vera Christiane Felscherinow; here, however, the focus is not on the northern quarter of Neukölln, but i.a. on Gropiusstadt in the south of the Neukölln borough.)

Neukölln feature films include the 1983 children's fantasy drama Conrad: The Factory-Made Boy (Konrad oder Das Kind aus der Konservenbüchse) by Claudia Schröder and Christine Nöstlinger, (Note: In the same year, the film was remade for US television by Nell Cox and Malcolm Marmorstein under the title Konrad.) the 2006 crime drama Tough Enough (Knallhart) by Detlev Buck, Zoran Drvenkar and Gregor Tessnow, the 2007 romance and crime drama Straight by Nicolas Flessa, the 2009 young adult crime melodrama Gangs by Rainer Matsutani, Peer Klehmet and Sebastian Wehlings, the 2011 science-fiction melodrama Dr. Ketel (Dr. Ketel – Der Schatten von Neukölln) by Linus and Anna de Paoli, the 2013 comedy drama Ummah – Among Friends (Ummah – Unter Freunden) by Cüneyt Kaya, the 2014 television legal drama The Limits of Patience (Das Ende der Geduld) by Christian Wagner and Stefan Dähnert, and the 2025 Shakespearean criminal tragedy No Beast. So Fierce. (Kein Tier. So Wild.) by Burhan Qurbani and Enis Maci.

Several television or streaming series have focused on Neukölln as well, for example the 2015 miniseries Ecke Weserstraße by Johannes Hertwig and Hayung von Oepen, the 2017 gang melodrama 4 Blocks by Richard Kropf, Hanno Hackfort and Bob Konrad, and the 2025 medical melodrama Berlin ER (KRANK Berlin) by Samuel Jefferson and Viktor Jakovleski. The 2018 legal melodrama Die Heiland – Wir sind Anwalt by Viola Jäger and Nina Philipp is heavily inspired by the life of Neukölln's former resident and Germany's first blind attorney Pamela Pabst.

Many documentary works have been produced on Neukölln, for example the TV documentary miniseries Kiez knallhart: Berlin-Neukölln (2021) by Story House Productions, and otherwise mainly feature-length films, for example Berlin-Neukölln (2002) by resident director Bernhard Sallmann, Neukölln Unlimited (2010) by Agostino Imondi and Dietmar Ratsch, Berlin: Hasenheide (2010) by Nana Rebhahn, Gangsterläufer (2011) by Christian Stahl, a precursor to his 2014 book (see above), or Survival in Neukölln (2017, Überleben in Neukölln) by Rosa von Praunheim. As part of its local and regional mandate, Berlin's public broadcaster RBB has co-produced several documentary films and series about Neukölln over the years, including history formats, for example Mein Neukölln – Wo gehste hin? Wo kommste her? (2015) by Neukölln native Wolfgang Ettlich or Neukölln wie es einmal war (2024) by Svenja Weber.

=== Music ===
External audio
- David Bowie & Brian Eno, "Neuköln" (from Heroes, Parlophone, 1977/2017, 4:34)
- Madeline Juno, "Neukölln" (from Besser kann ich es nicht erklären, Universal, 2021, 3:52)
- Lena Stoehrfaktor with KVSTR, "Sonnenallee" (from Essenz, EP, 2022, 3:33)

Songs referencing Neukölln or its residents are mostly from German artists, for example the 2017 hip hop song Sonnenallee by AOB (Army of Brothers) and Said, the 2004 indie rock song Wovon lebt eigentlich Peter? by Winson, the 2008 rock song Neukölln (also known as Neukölln, Du alte Hure) by Kalle Kalkowski from the album Liebesgrüße aus Neukölln ("From Neukölln with Love"), the 2021 pop song Sonnenallee by Tina Naderer, the 2022 farewell elegy Neukölln by Madeline Juno, the 2013 hip hop song Das ist Neukölln by Exxar and Kiddkey, the 2008 hip hop song Neukölln 44 feat. Kreuzberg 361 by DJ AK in cooperation with several local German and Turkish rappers, the 2011 satirical folk song Neukölln ist auf Scheiße gebaut by Otto Kuhnle, the 2022 alternative hip hop song Sonnenallee by Lena Stoehrfaktor, or the proletarian love letter Dit is Neukölln ("This is Neukölln") by Kurt Krömer and Gabi Decker, originally from a television skit and sung to the tune of I Got You Babe, while tangential references are usually found in Deutschrap songs, for example the 2019 U7 Freestyle by Luvre47. Italian progressive rock band Barock Project published their concept album Coffee in Neukölln in 2012.

Several instrumental works also reference Neukölln, most notably the 1977 David Bowie and Brian Eno track Neuköln [sic!] from the album Heroes, (Note: Some distributors of Bowie's album have occasionally changed the original spelling Neuköln to Neukölln on some international releases.) which was later reworked for orchestra by Philip Glass as the fifth movement of his Symphony No. 4 – Heroes (1996), and also inspired the fusion jazz diptych Neuköln (Day) and Neuköln (Night) by Dylan Howe (2007/14). Other instrumental works include the 1953 march Die Rixdorfer Blasmusik ("The Rixdorfian Brass Music") by Otto "der zackige Otto" Kermbach, the 1983 electronic composition Hasenheide by Dieter Moebius, the 2004 track Neukölln 2 by Kittin, the 2012 deep house track Neukölln Burning by resident producer Deepchild, the 2011 Mogwai release Hasenheide, or the 2012 tech house track Neukoelln Mon Amour [sic!] by Swayzak.

==== Der Rixdorfer ====
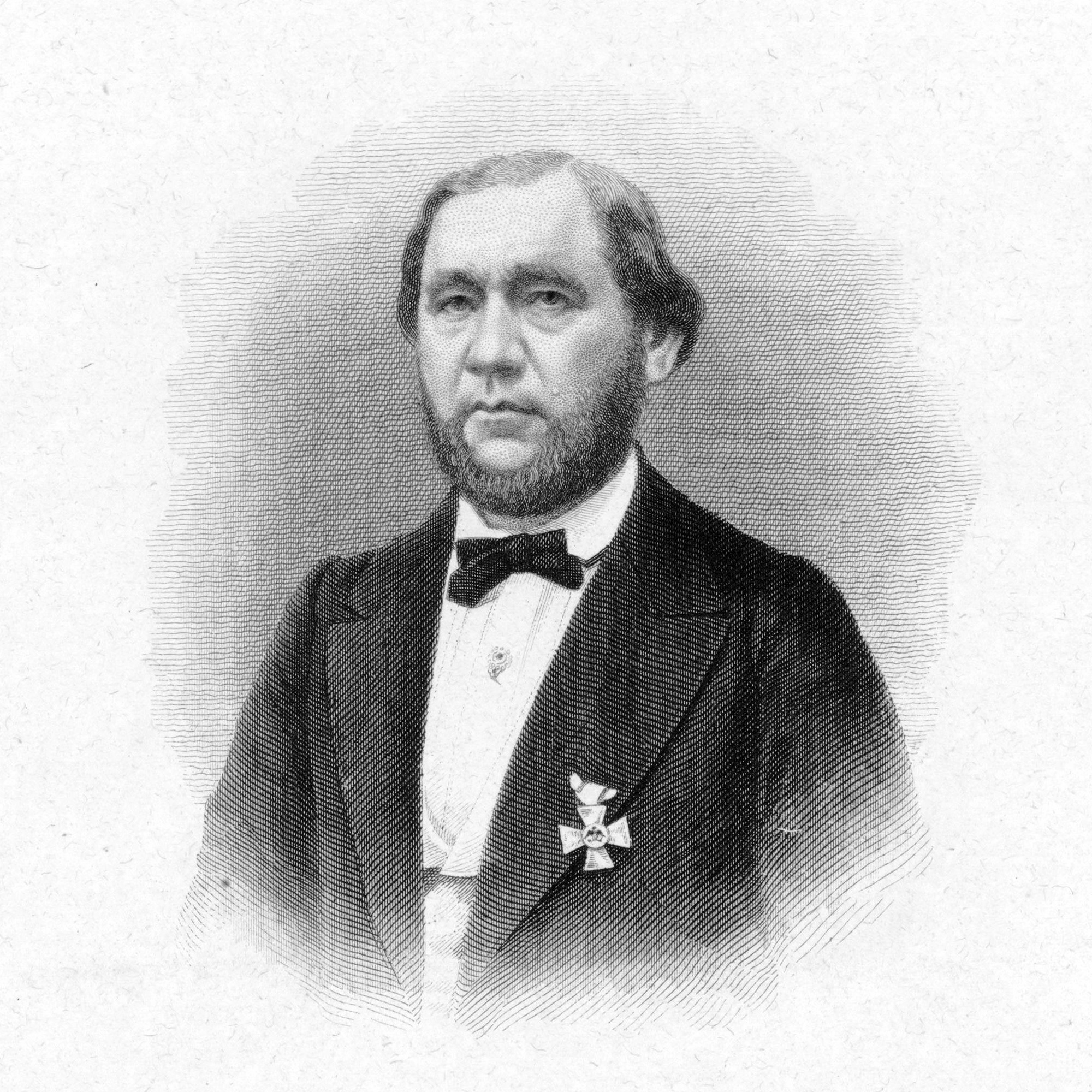
Benjamin Bilse, 1870

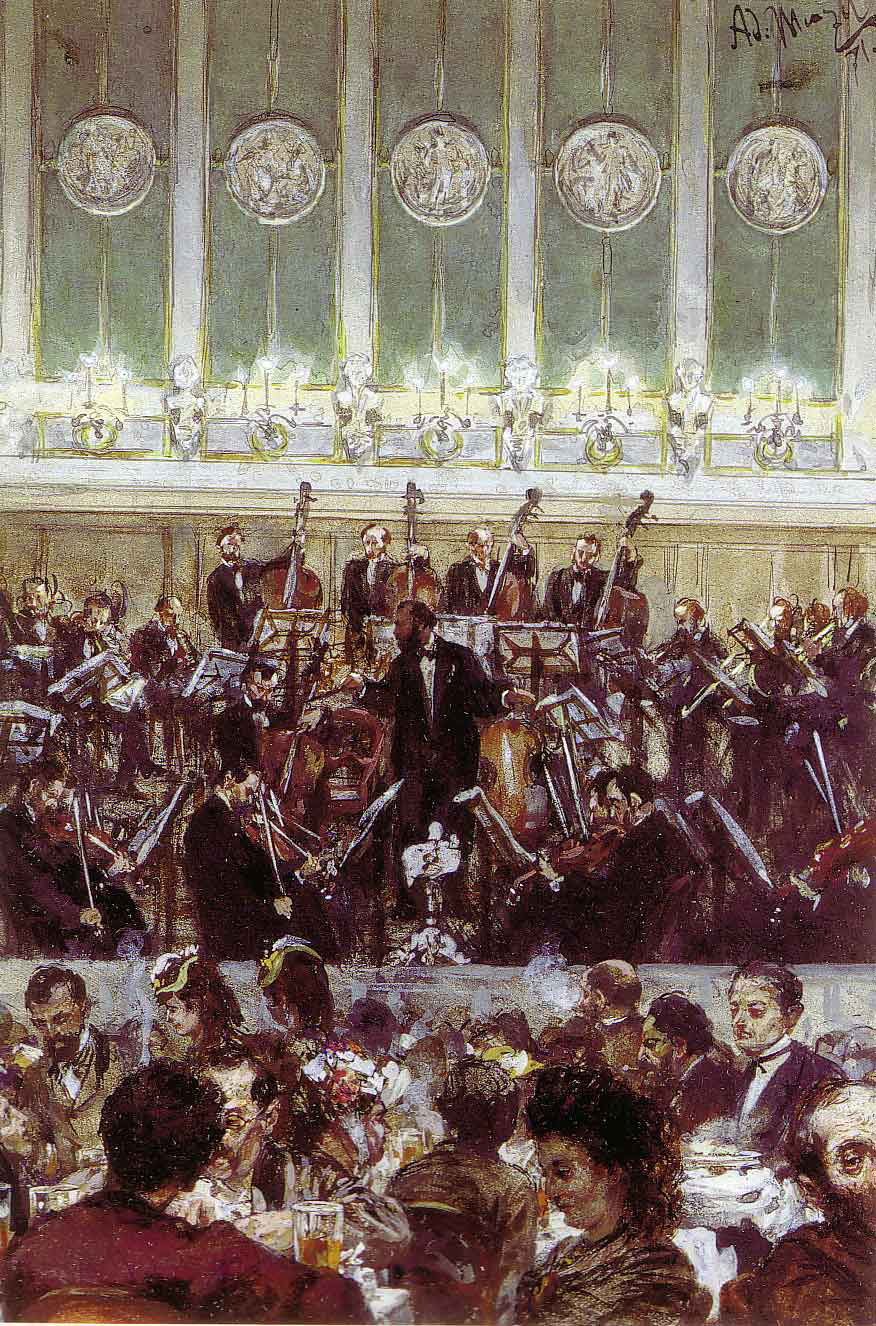
Bilse'sche Kapelle, 1871

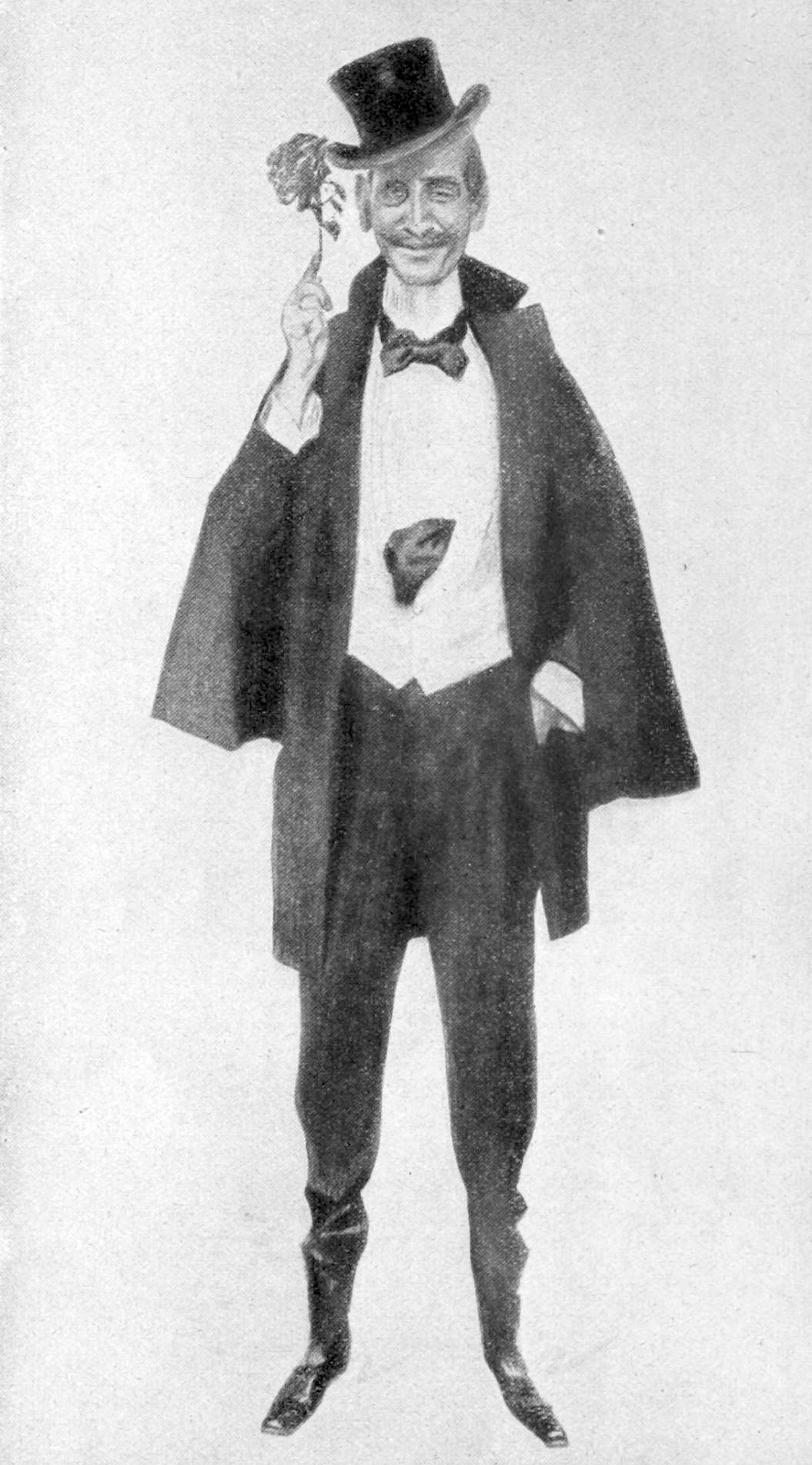
Heinrich Littke-Carlsen, caricature, ca. 1890

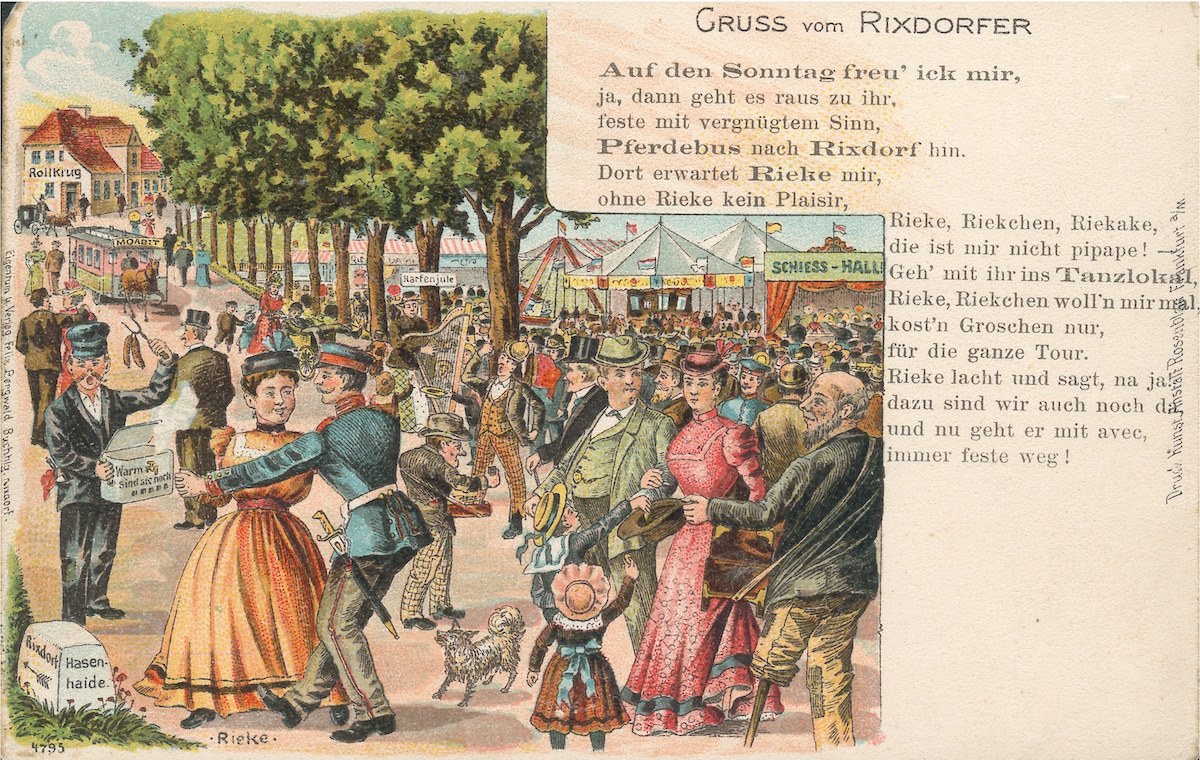
Gruß vom Rixdorfer, postcard, ca. 1899 (Note: The postcard contains an excerpt of Oskar Klein's lyrics for the Rixdorfer; the fictional Franz and Rieke, mentioned in the lyrics, are shown dancing in the foreground at a fair on the grounds of the Neue Welt on the street Hasenheide in Rixdorf; in the background the Rollkrug tavern and the Pferde-Eisenbahn to Moabit.)

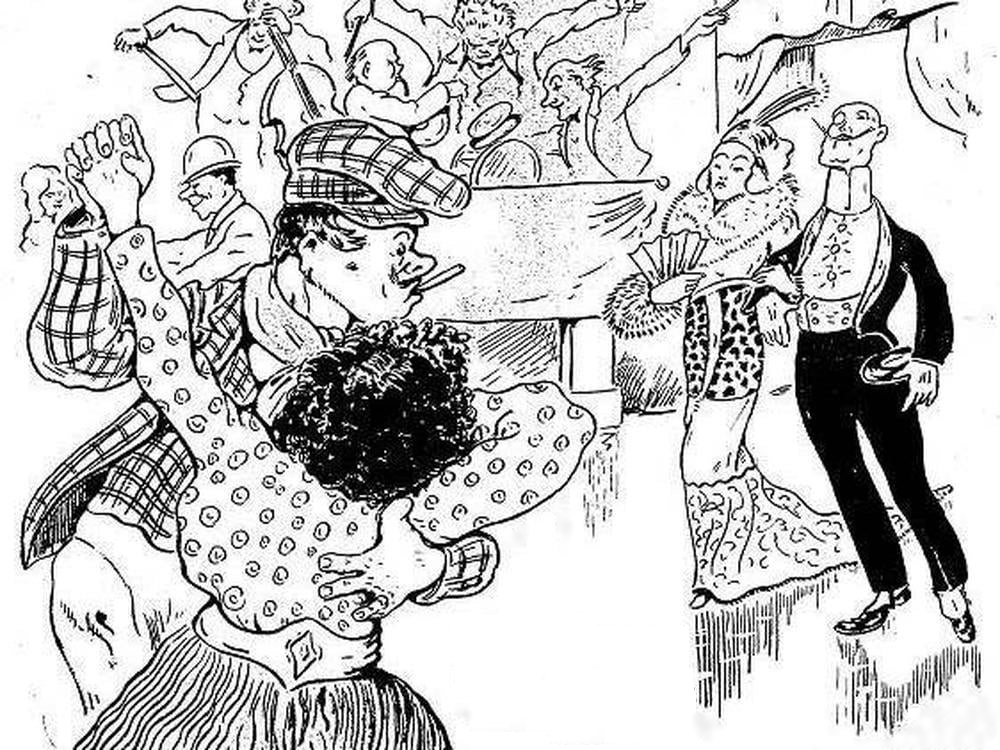
Berlin nightlife and the schieber, caricature, 1912

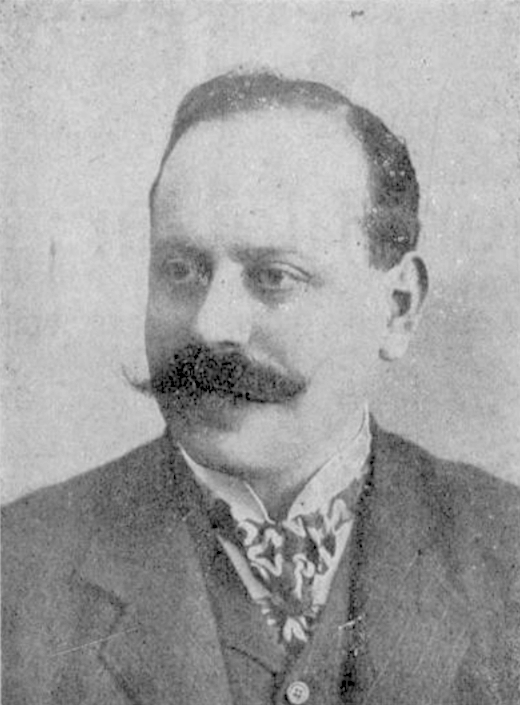
Gustav Schönwald, ca. 1905

"Rixdorfer Bauern-Polka"
Gustav Schönwald (1905; Homokord, 1914)

"Rixdorfer Bauernhochzeit"
Gustav Schönwald (1905; Favorite, 1914)

Der Rixdorfer
- Tanzorchester Otto Kermbach, instrumental (Polydor, 1937, 2:50)
- Orchester Georg Grohrock-Ferrari (Gloria, 1938, 2:38)
- Erwin Hartung, Orchester Otto Kermbach, alternate lyrics by Josef Freundenthal (Amiga, 1949, 2:56)
- Musikkorps der Schutzpolizei Berlin, Heinz Winkel (cond.), instrumental (Telefunken, 1954, 3:20)
- Willi Rose, Orchester und Blasorchester Otto Kermbach (from Wir versaufen unser' Oma ihr klein' Häuschen, Ariola, 1959, 2:26)
- Manfred Korth, Spreeathener Blasmusik (from Hochzeit bei Zickenschulze, Amiga, 1981, 2:13)
- Hermann Prey, WDR Symphony Orchestra Cologne, Heinz Geese (cond.) (from Ich sing mein schönstes Lied, Capriccio, 2009, 3:00)

The song that cemented Rixdorf's infamy as a city of vice across Germany, which eventually prompted the renaming to Neukölln, is the 1889 satirical couplet Der Rixdorfer ("The Rixdorfian"), also known under the title In Rixdorf ist Musike, (Note: The German figure of speech da ist Musik [drin] (lit. "it contains music") has a more general meaning of something having verve and energy. At least one release also uses the alternate subtitle uff den Sonntag freu ick mir ("I'm looking forward to Sunday"), lifted directly from the song's original lyrics.) with music in the style of a polka march by Eugen Philippi (1856–1920) (Note: Philippi was a pianist, kapellmeister and composer of popular music; Theo Stengel, Herbert Gerigk (eds.), Lexikon der Juden in der Musik, Berlin 1940, col. 213, s.v. "Philipp, Eugen". He was born Eugen Peile Philipp on 14 October 1856 in Lübeck to Julius Salomon Philipp and Rosalia (néé Silberstein). Philippi and his wife Gertrud (néé Arnfeld) had three children, and he died on 21 May 1920 in Berlin-Charlottenburg; Die Stimme 14 (8), p. 249. In his youth, he moved to Munich's Isarvorstadt, where he became a musical director already in his early twenties; Adreßbuch von München für das Jahr 1880, München 1880, p. 220; Münchener Anzeiger 31 (345), 11 December 1878, p. 2, col. 1, no. 5, s.v. "Bamberger Hof". He later mainly lived and worked in Berlin, i.a. in the Königsstadt district, where around 1892 he also ran a sample storage facility for cotillion items; W. & S. Loewenthal (eds.), Berliner Adreß Buch für das Jahr 1892, Berlin 1892. From 1910 to 1917, he also owned a manor in Saunstorf (Bobitz), which he registered as a farmer with an oath of fealty (Homagialeid), and which he expanded and redeveloped between 1914 and 1916; Juliane Kruse, "Gutshaus Saunstorf in Mecklenburg-Vorpormmern", Historische Häuser, 17 March 2024; Regierungs-Blatt für das Großherzogtum Mecklenburg-Schwerin, Amtliche Beilage Nr. 40, §13.4, Schwerin 1910 (11 August 1910). Like many composers of the time, Philippi was a supporter of the performance royalties movement, which led to the AFMA, founded in 1903 by Richard Strauss et al., argued for by Philippi with an article in a professional journal (Eugen Philippi, "Die Gründung einer Tantiemen-Anstalt in Deutschland", Deutsche Musikdirektoren-Zeitung 4 [36], Leipzig 1902), for which he was a regular contributor, i.a. with an article on John Philip Sousa.) and lyrics by Oskar Klein (ca. 1852–1923). (Note: Oskar (also Oscar) Klein was a lyricist, dramatist, librettist for mostly operettas and burlesque music theater, and patron of Willy Prager. Until the 1910s, he also worked as president of the Berlin amusement society Tyll Eulenspiegel, which was part of the rather tame satirical kabarett nightlife scene of late imperial Berlin that eventually faded during the war years and was supplanted by a more refined and modernized culture during Berlin's Roaring Twenties (Hans Ostwald, Das galante Berlin, Berlin 1928, ch. 26, pp. 165–76). Klein's last work for theater mentioned in the German National Library archives is Am Nordseestrand (May 1910) with music by Hans Schlothen. From 1914 to 1922, Klein worked as editor of the satirical weekly magazine Der Brummer, originally created as a humorous war magazine, and published i.a. by the Verlag Lustige Gesellschaft. His biographical data is vague, but he was born on 7 June 1852 in Ratibor, where he became a merchant before choosing an artistic career; after moving to Berlin, he started out as director of the Literarisches Institut in 1881; Wilhelm Kosch (ed.), Deutsches Theater-Lexikon 3, Klagenfurt/Vienna 1960, p. 1013, s.v. "Klein, Oskar". Klein and his wife Wally (néé Ebstein) had one daughter; his date or year of death is unknown, but his final work as editor of Der Brummer was published in late 1922.) The couplet ranks among the first widely popular songs (gassenhauer) of the early schlager genre, which came under fire from conservative music commentators for its artistic inferiority and socially corrosive potential after the turn of the century.

The polka's original instrumental version was already performed in 1871 as a carnival song by Benjamin Bilse and his ensemble Bilse'sche Kapelle ("Bilse's Band"), the precursor to the Berlin Philharmonic, at Berlin's Concerthaus on Leipziger Straße, where the ensemble had a regular engagement from 1867 to 1885. It had been adapted from a traditional polka melody, which had been imported from the Bohemian Forest by two of the ensemble's woodwind musicians, who had served in Bohemia as part of the Kaiser Franz regiment during the 1866 Austro-Prussian War. (Note: This instrumental version of the music had also been used for a brief period as an accompaniment to a dance by the clown Herr Boganowsky (pseud.), who later also worked for the Circus Busch.)

After the polka had fallen into oblivion for many years, it suddenly exploded in popularity when the music was appropriated by Philippi and adapted to Klein's pre-existing lyrics in 1889. (Note: The received lyrics were written by Klein in 1889, and the music was adapted soon after; the song was first published in 1895 (Philippi, op. 18); cf. Lukas Richter, Der Berliner Gassenhauer: Darstellung – Dokumente – Sammlung (Volksliedstudien 4), Münster 2004, p. 96 sq., 253 sq. The first piano sheet version was published by Harmonie in 1904, arranged by Victor Hollaender. It is unknown, whether Philippi or Klein initiated the creation of the Rixdorfer, but since Klein's Tyll Eulenspiegel was also a carnival society, the score of Bilse's original version was probably well-known in Berlin's small carnival circles.) The new song was at first performed live by satirist Heinrich Littke-Carlsen in the late 19th century at Rixdorf's concert hall Neue Welt and Berlin's variety theater Wintergarten. It soon became "probably the most widespread local dance", (Note: Anonymous commentary (ca. 1900): "wohl der verbreitetste Lokaltanz", in: ibid., p. 266.) fostered the adoption of new dancing styles like the indecent schieber, (Note: Littke-Carlsen himself had already coupled his performances of the song with the schieber, which formed the term Rixdorfer into a synonym for the new dance; in 1912, correlating with Rixdorf's renaming to Neukölln, the schieber was banned by law enforcement executive order; Gunda Bartels, "Wie aus Rixdorf Neukölln wurde: Der Ruf war ruiniert", Tagesspiegel, 26 January 2012.) spawned several imitations around Berlin like the Minna-Polka by Paul Lincke (1902), (Note: Furthermore, the term "Rixdorf" itself became a welcome artistic ingredient, either as part of song titles, e.g. Die Rixdorfer Blasmusik by Otto Kermbach (see above) or Neue Rixdorfer Polka by Philippi himself (1899, op. 29; Friedrich Hofmeister [ed.], Verzeichniss der im Jahre 1899 erschienenen Musikalien, Leipzig 1899/1900, p. 131, col. 1, s.v. "Philippi, Eugen"), or as a lyrical replacement for other localities to potentially boost a song's popularity, substituting e.g. "Pankow" (or "Seckbach") in the polka Komm, Karlineken, Komm, which was also composed by Eugen Philippi; Sabine Giesebrecht-Schutte, "Zum Stand der Unterhaltungsmusik um 1900", in: Kaspar Maase, Wolfgang Kaschuba (eds.), Schund und Schönheit – Populäre Kultur um 1900, Cologne/Weimar/Vienna 2001, p. 114–60, n. 58 (135).) and eventually spread throughout the empire's dance halls.

Several recordings of the song were published over the decades, the first being the Rixdorfer Bauern-Polka ("Rixdorfian peasants' polka"), a semi-instrumental version arranged by Max Büchner (1862–1906) with an accompanying comedic skit written by Martin Bendix, recorded 1905 in Berlin onto an Edison cylinder, performed by the Büchner-Kapelle with actor and media pioneer Gustav Schönwald, and widely released for the first time in 1914 by Homokord. (Note: The original 1905 recording title was simply Der Rixdorfer – Polka (Edison Gold Walze 15 250); Schönwald, Büchner and Bendix also recorded an alternate version, which was widely released as Rixdorfer Bauernhochzeit ("Rixdorfian country wedding") by Favorite Record in 1914 as well.) A recording in the style of the popular all-male close harmony groups followed in 1938, performed by Georg Grohrock-Ferrari and his ensemble. An early East German recording of the song in an arrangement by Reiny Roland used alternate toned-down lyrics, originally written by Josef Freudenthal, and was recorded in 1949 by actor Erwin Hartung, while the most prominent version with the original lyrics was recorded in 1959 by actor Willi Rose, both versions with Otto Kermbach's orchestra. (Note: A later reissue of Hartung's version by Deutsche Heimat mislabeled the song as recorded by Walter Künzel and his orchestra.) The Rixdorfer remained popular through modern times, recorded in 1976 by James Last or in 1981 by Manfred Korth and the brass ensemble Spreeathener Blasmusik. A symphonic version, recorded by baritone Hermann Prey with the WDR Symphony Orchestra Cologne, was published in 2009.

Instrumental versions of the Rixdorfer have been released since the first recordings by Schönwald in 1905, for example a 1928 foxtrot couplet by Georges Boulanger and arranged by Hermann "Ben Berlin" Biek for Vox Records, (Note: Vox 8570 E (master: 2137-1BB); Georges Boulanger Konzert-Jazz-Orchester, recorded November or December 1927, released January 1928; rereleased on Kristall 3008 ("Georges Boulanger und sein Orchester – Spezial-Arrangement: H. Bik").) a 1937 recording by Otto Kermbach's orchestra, or a 1981 version for barrel organ by Georg Kuwest. The most well-known instrumental version of Neukölln's unofficial anthem is the 1954 recording by conductor Heinz Winkel with the music corps of Berlin's Schutzpolizei.

The song's original adulterous lyrics are usually recited with a strong Berlin dialect in the first person by a protagonist called Franz. They describe his free and easy Sunday partying and dancing spree in Rixdorf, and his meeting his long-time companion, an older woman called Rieke, who insinuates to also be a prostitute. (Note: Signified by the common euphemistic use of dancing for intercourse and her words: Kost'n Groschen nur für die ganze Tour. Rieke lacht und sagt: "Na ja, dazu sind wir auch noch da!" ("It'll cost only a Groschen for the whole shebang. Rieke laughs and says: 'Well, that's what we're there for, too!'"). For the complete German lyrics, see e.g. "In Rixdorf ist Musike – Der Rixdorfer – Willi Rose", rixdorf.info. The character's name Rieke is also a pun on the Rix in Rixdorf, chosen to personify the city and its vice; see History of Neukölln § Etymologies for the toponym's alternate spelling as Rieksdorf.)

== Quotes ==
All things which occur through time, vanish with time. Therefore, it is necessary to make them steady, and to cement them, in deeds and tangible form.

— Richardsdorf foundational charter, 1360 (Note: "Alle Dinge, die in der Zeit geschehen, vergehen mit der Zeit. Darum ist es notwendig, sie stetig zu machen und zu festigen mit Urkunden und Handfestigen" (nds.: "Alle ding, dy geschyen jn der tydt, dy vorgan mit der tydt. Hirumme ist id not, dat man sy stetige vnd veste met briuen vnd hantuestigen"). Richardsdorf foundational charter, 1360 (digital copy).)

In Rixdorf and Neukölln, aspirations, fears and hopes temporarily concentrated, to escape the "old" homelands and their provincial constrictions, their mental and social hardships. Neukölln as utopia, thus as a non-place, where suffering and happiness fatefully coalesced, and where the desire for escape seems to have a timeless presence.

— Udo Gösswald, "Immer wieder Heimat", 1997 (Note: "[In Rixdorf und Neukölln verdichteten] sich temporär Sehnsüchte, Ängste und Hoffnungen […], um der provinziellen Enge, dem mentalen und sozialen Elend in der 'alten' Heimat zu entfliehen. Neukölln als Utopia, also Nicht-Ort, an dem sich Leid und Freude schicksalhaft verbanden und der Wunsch nach Flucht eine überzeitliche Präsenz zu haben scheint." Udo Gösswald, "Immer wieder Heimat", in: id. (ed.), Immer wieder Heimat – 100 Jahre Heimatmuseum Neukölln, Wiesbaden 1997, p. 8–15 (8).)

If we continue to only observe, we in Neukölln-Nord won't be far from Whitechapel in 10 to 15 years.

— Borough mayor Heinz Buschkowsky, interview, 2008 (Note: "Wenn wir weiter nur zuschauen, werden wir in 10 bis 15 Jahren in Neukölln-Nord von Whitechapel nicht mehr weit entfernt sein." Heinz Buschkowsky in: "Interview: 'Wir müssen Erwerbstätigkeit auch mit Druck einfordern'", Tagesspiegel, 30 June 2008 (archived).)

Depending on how you look at it, you can say: here [in Neukölln] people manage to get along with each other pretty well in a confined space; or: it is more of a side by side, at times also a head-to-head.

— Berlin integration commissioner Derviş Hızarcı, interview, 2024 (Note: "Je nachdem, wie man draufschaut, kann man sagen: Hier schaffen es Menschen, auf engen [sic!] Raum recht gut miteinander auszukommen. Oder: Es ist mehr ein Nebeneinander, hin und wieder auch ein Gegeneinander." Derviş Hızarcı in: Madlen Haarbach, "Warum immer Neukölln?", Tagesspiegel, 28 October 2024 (archived).)

It is always a boon and bane at the same time, when a district [like Neukölln] is far ahead of its time.

— Neukölln integration commissioner Güner Balcı, interview, 2025 (Note: "Es ist immer Fluch und Segen zugleich, wenn ein Bezirk seiner Zeit weit voraus ist." Güner Balcı in: Erik Heier, "Neukölln-Buch 'Heimatland' von Güner Balci: 'Wallah, die spinnt!'", tip, 1 August 2025 (archived).)

== Gallery ==
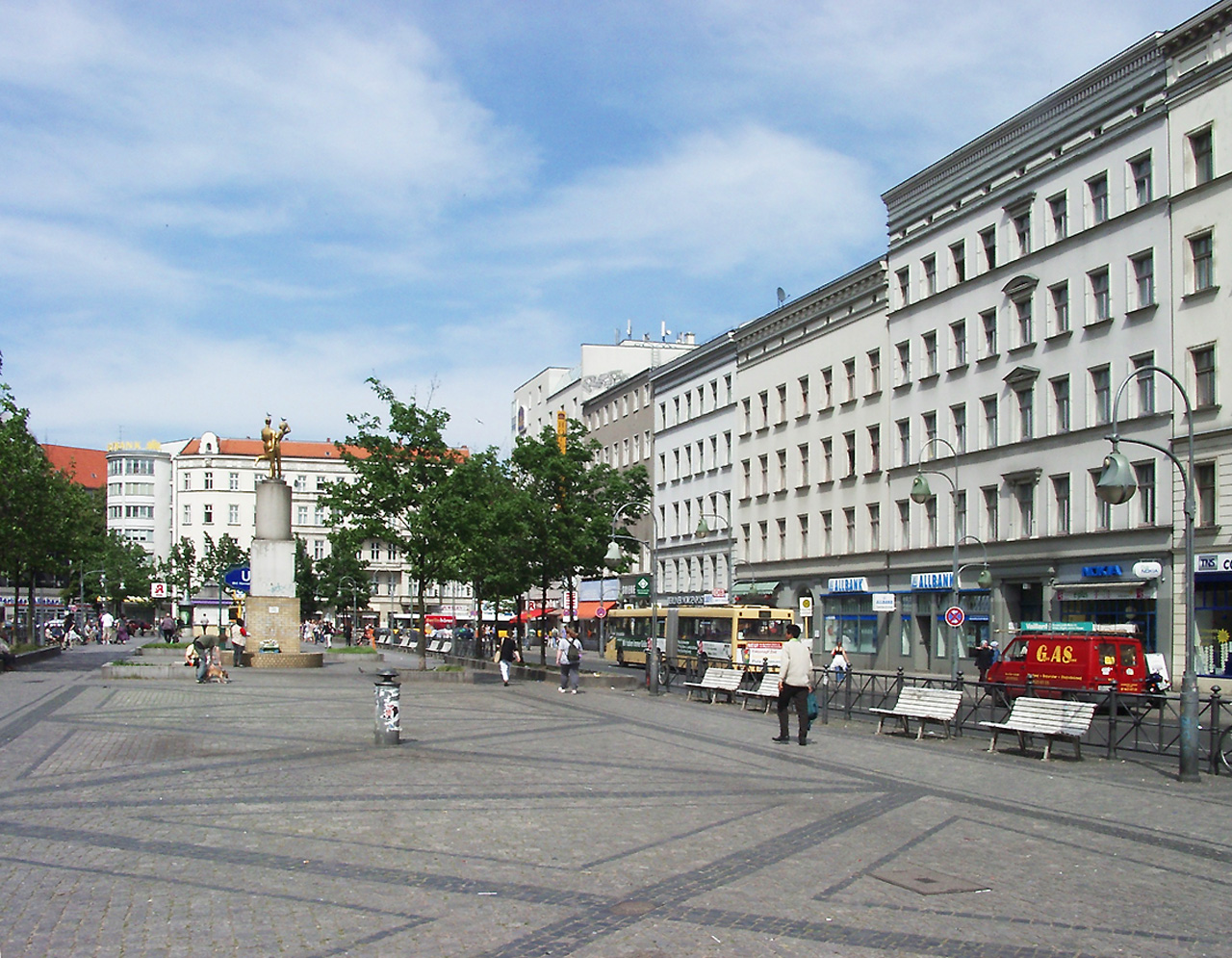
Hermannplatz, Donaukiez

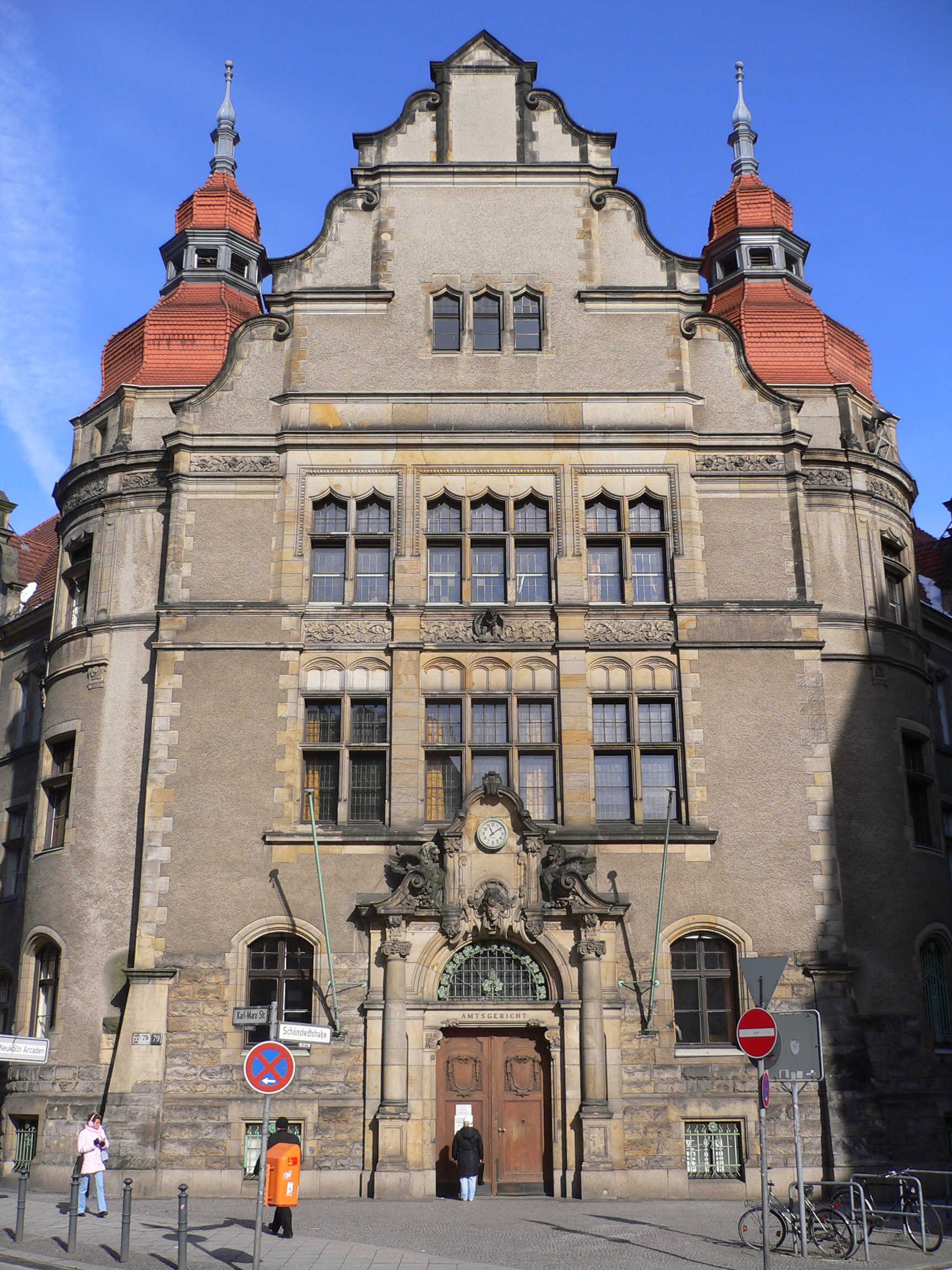
County Court

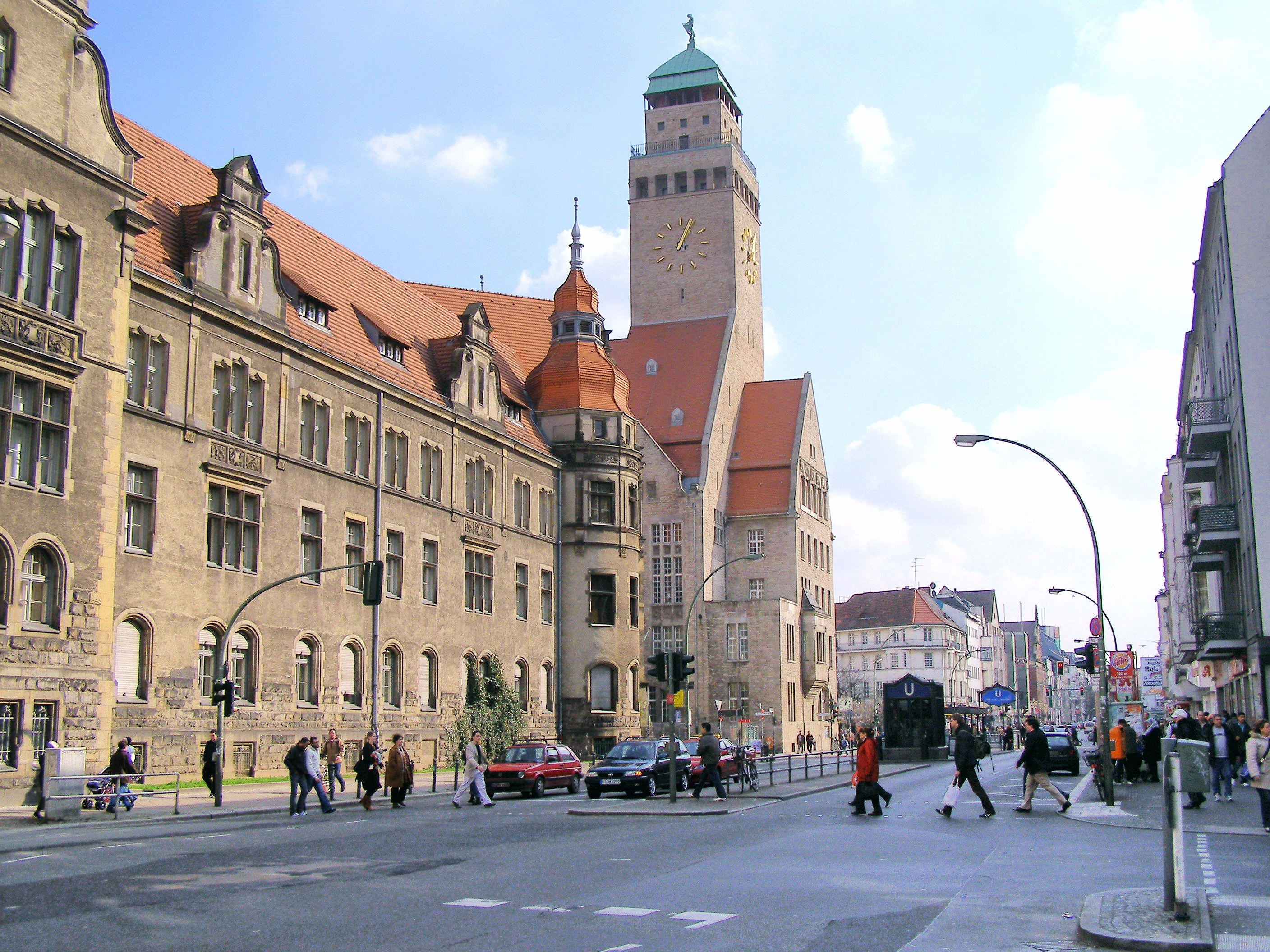
County Court and City Hall

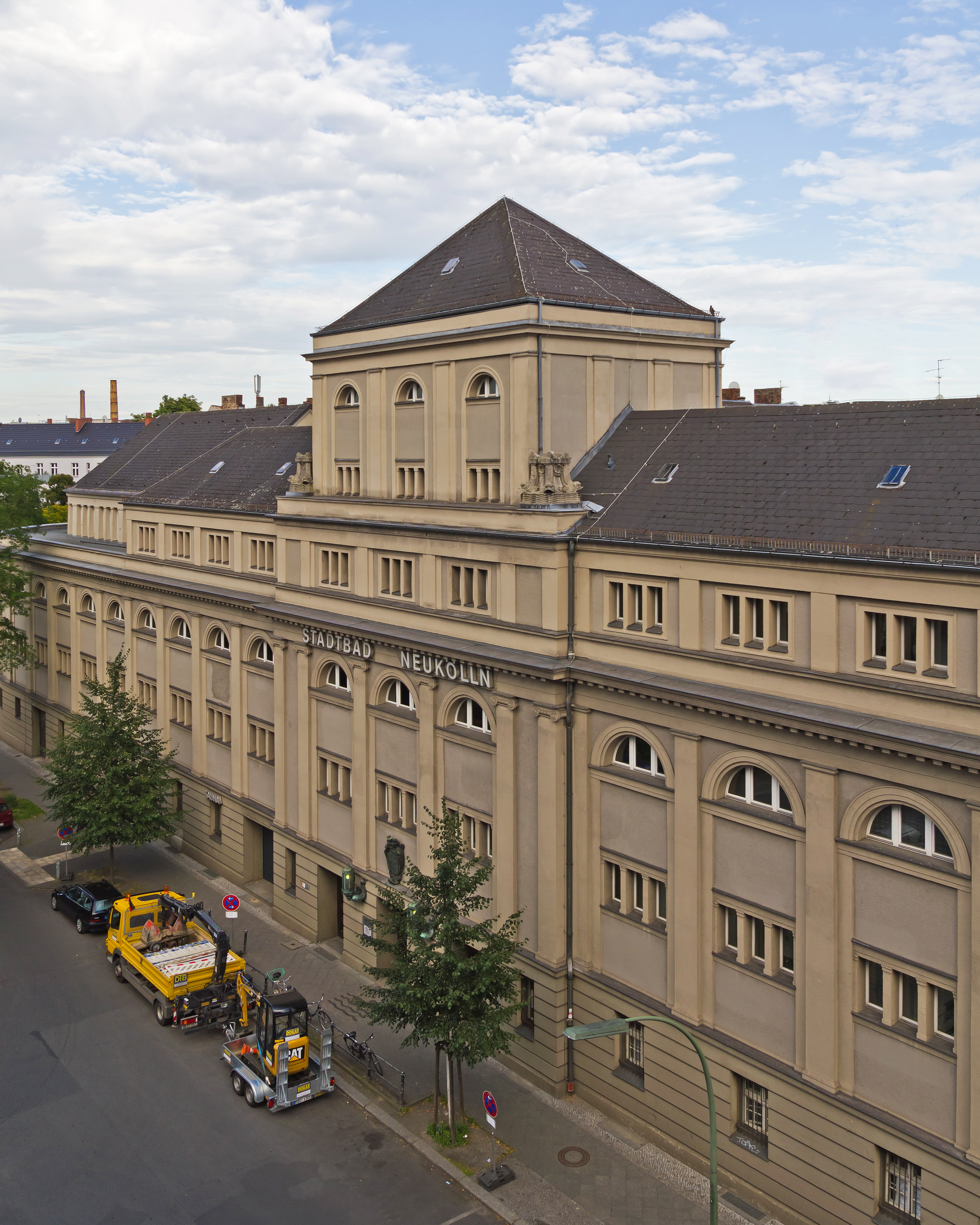
Public bath house

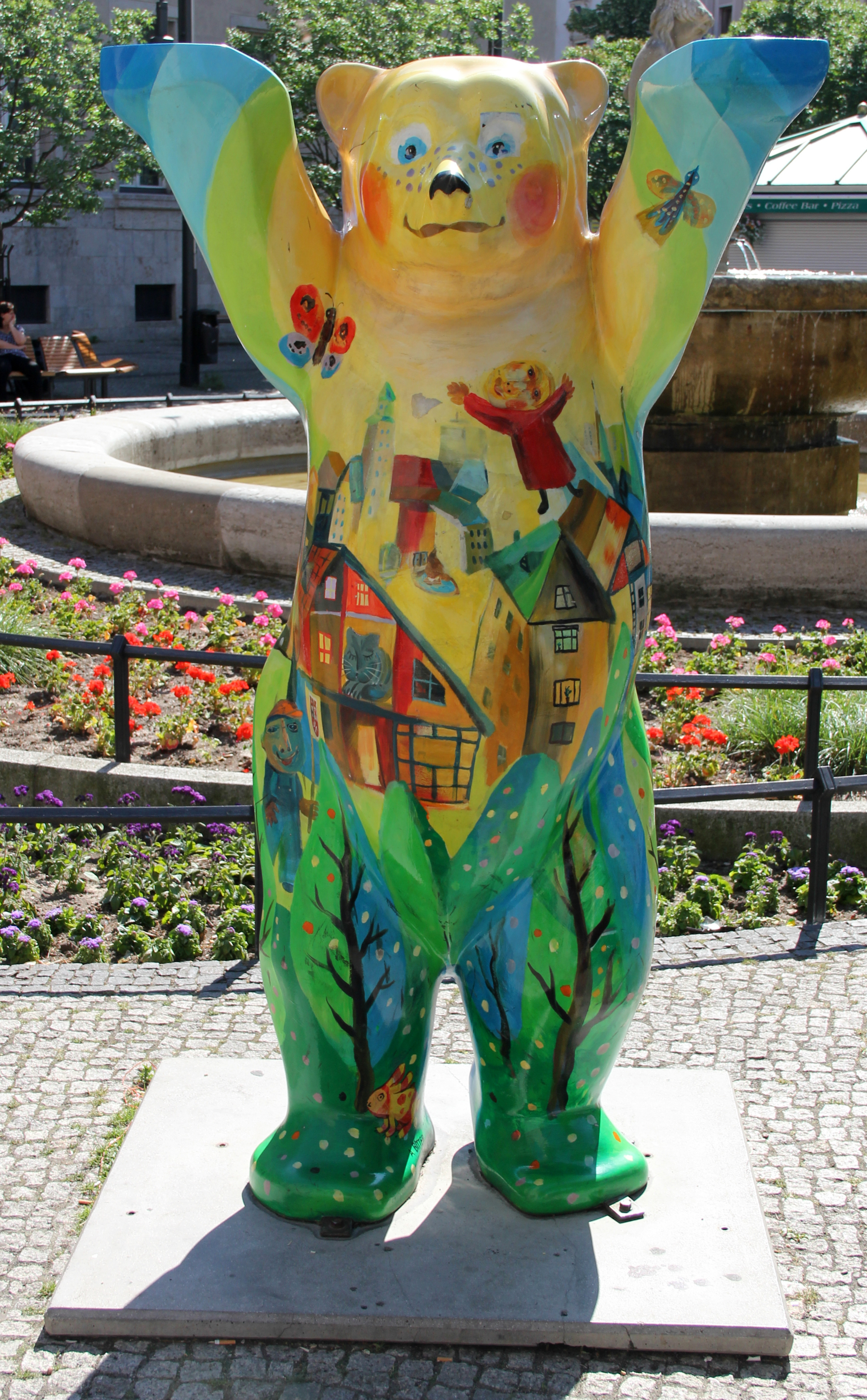
Buddy Bear Rixi at City Hall

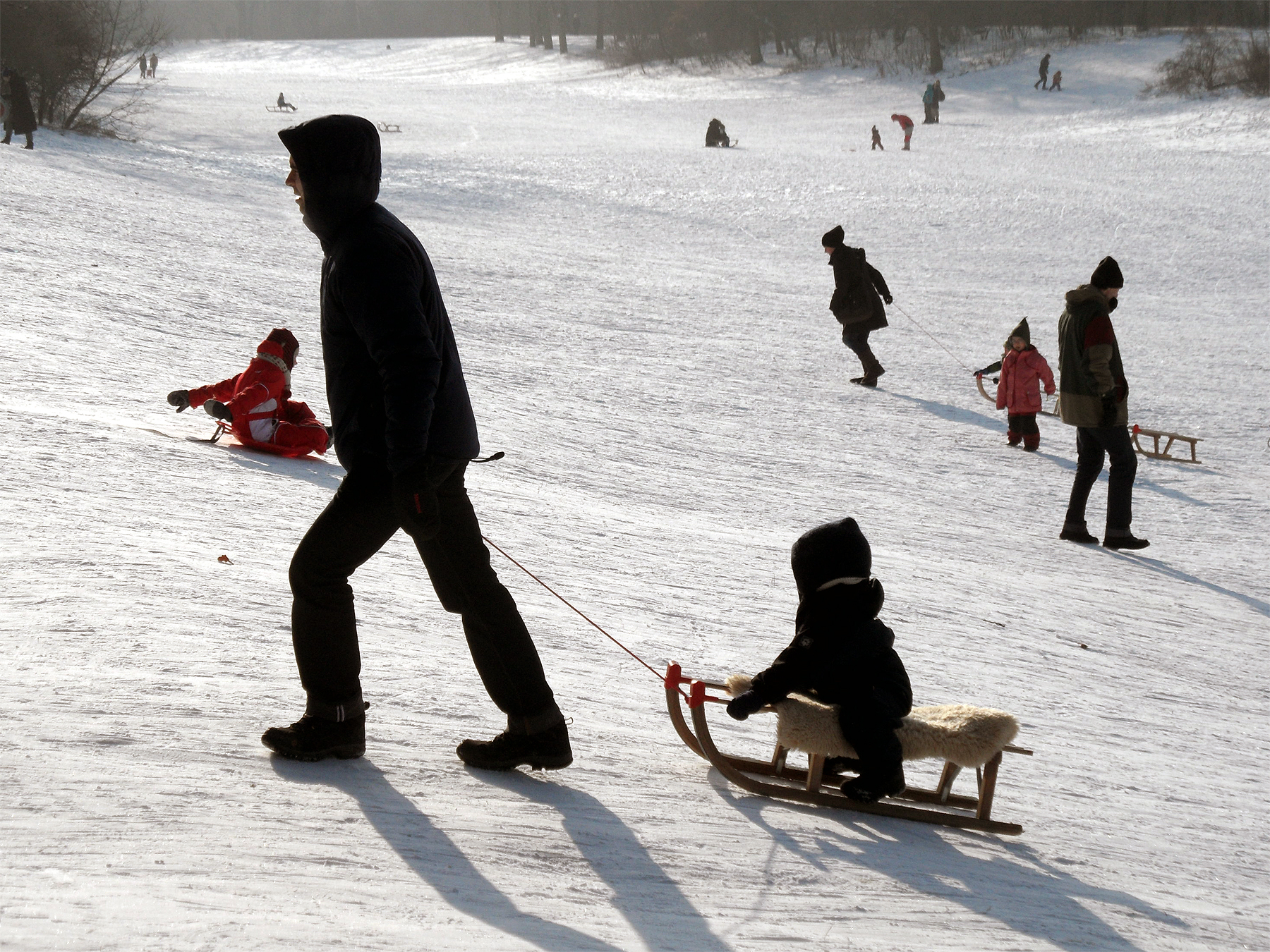
Volkspark Hasenheide in winter, 2013

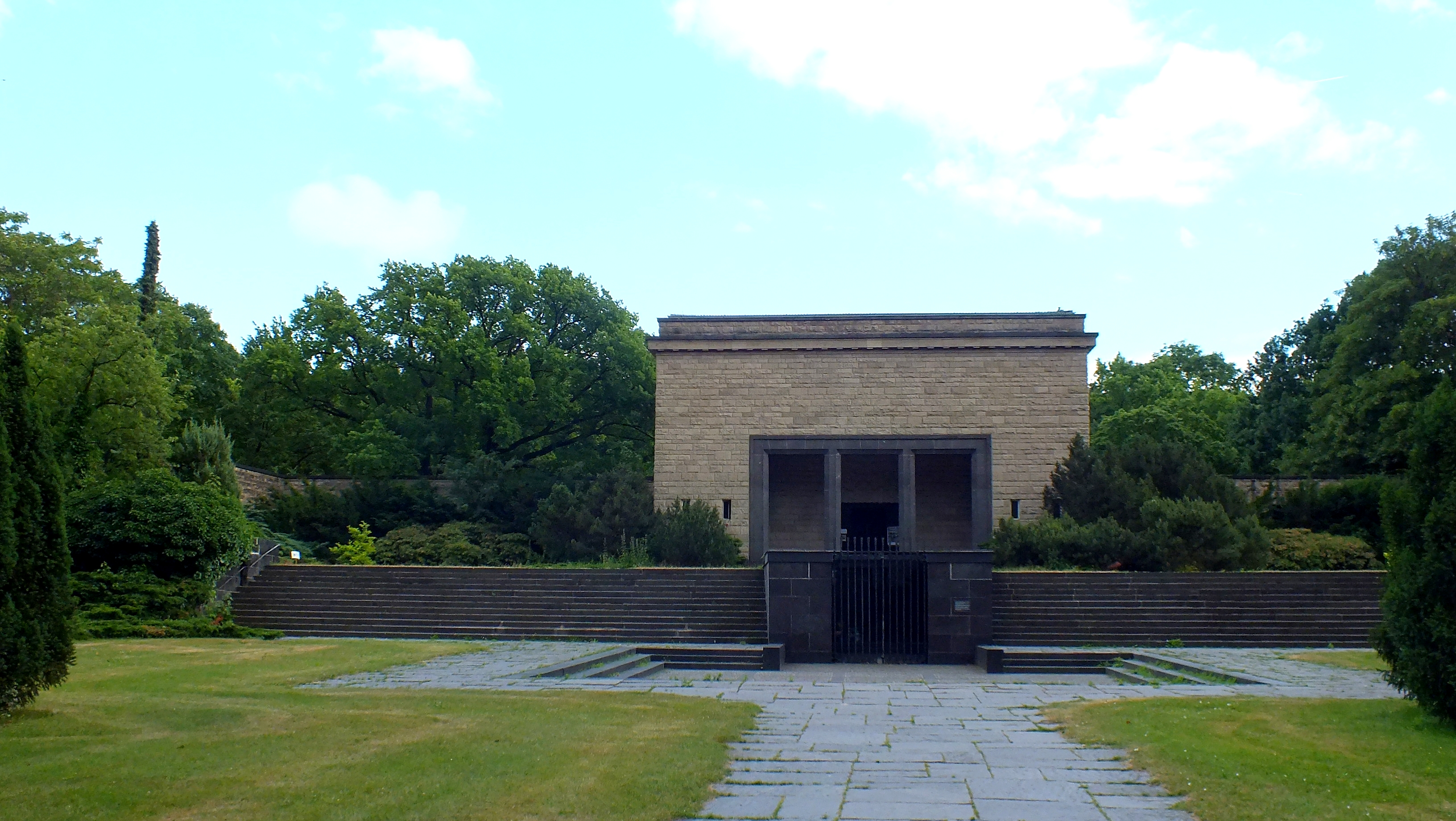
Hall of Honor, Lilienthalstraße cemetery, Hasenheide
