= Notable people from Neukölln =

Notable people from the Neukölln locality in Berlin, Germany

This is a list of notable people associated with Neukölln, a quarter of Berlin, Germany. It includes people who were born in Neukölln, as well as those who lived, worked, or were otherwise closely associated with the locality throughout its history. Notable figures include architectural sculptor Lee Lawrie, actor Horst Buchholz, jurist Jutta Limbach, philosopher Susan Neiman, footballer Antonio Rüdiger, and artist Lena Braun. The list distinguishes between natives, residents, and other significant associates.

== Notable people ==
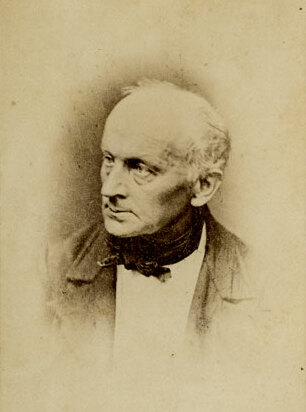
Bruno Bauer

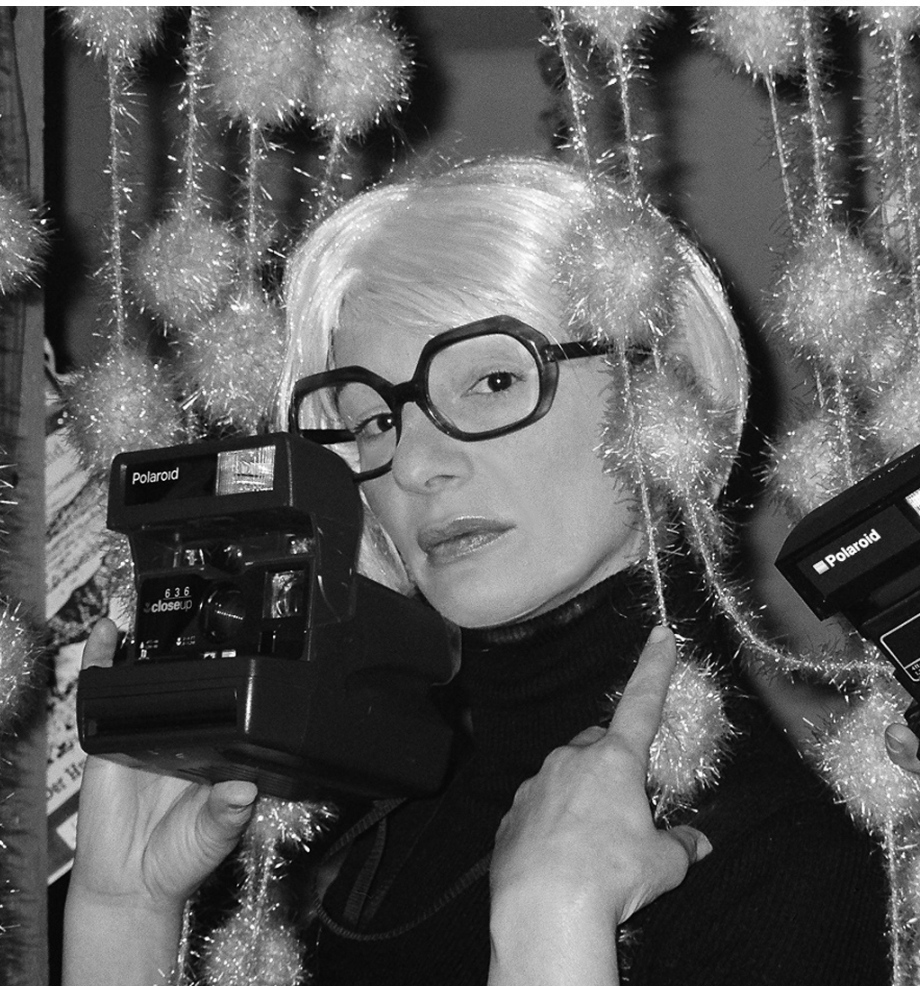
Lena Braun

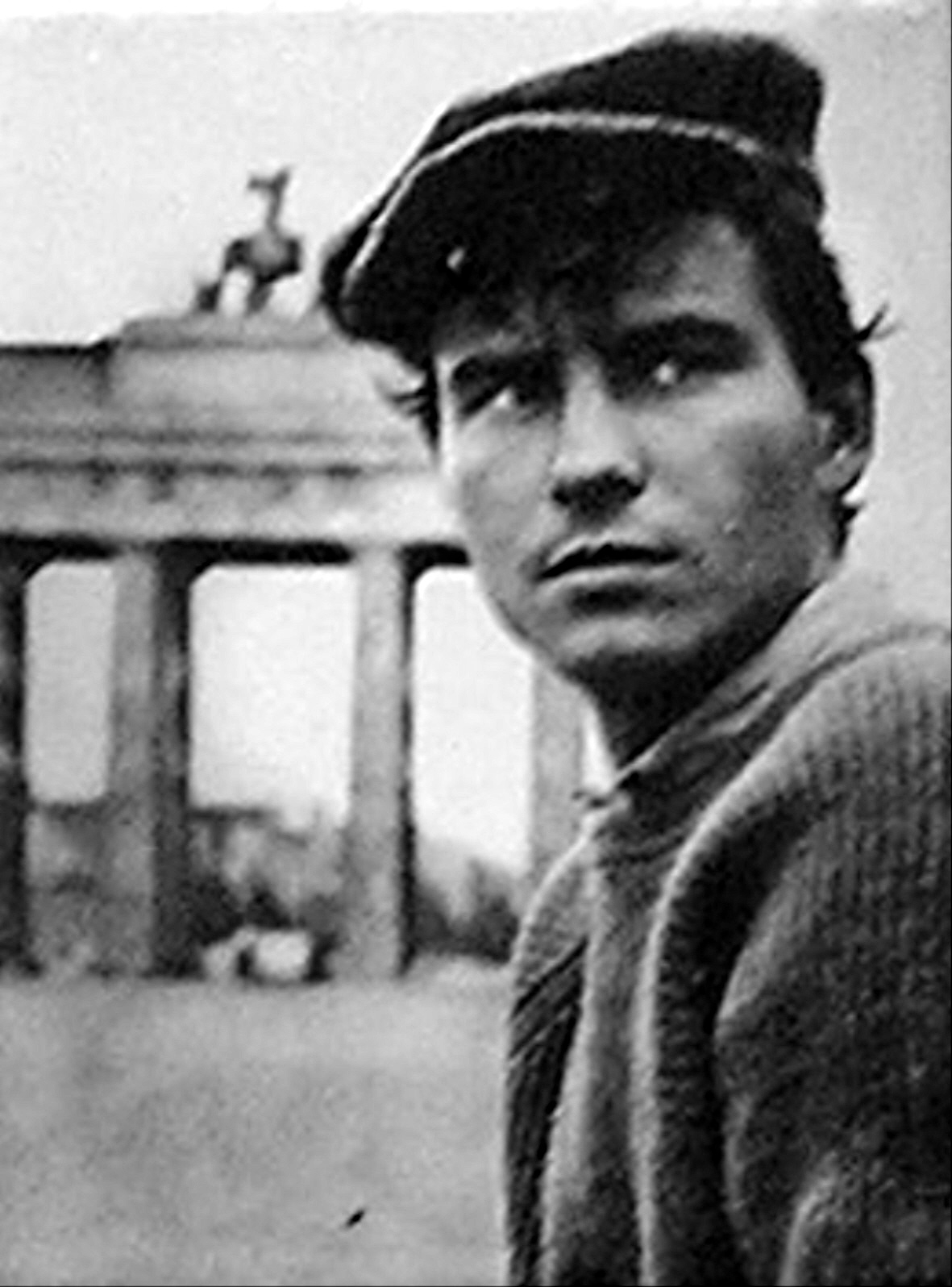
Horst Buchholz

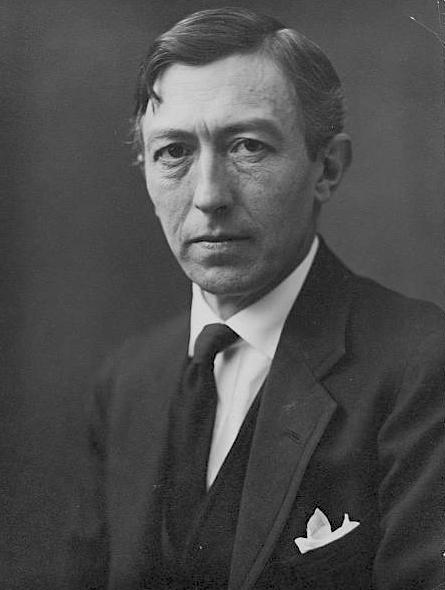
Lee Lawrie

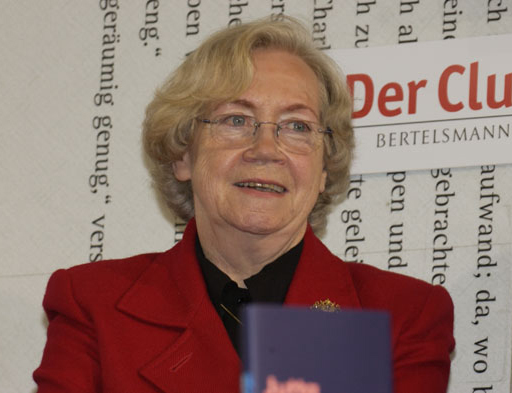
Jutta Limbach

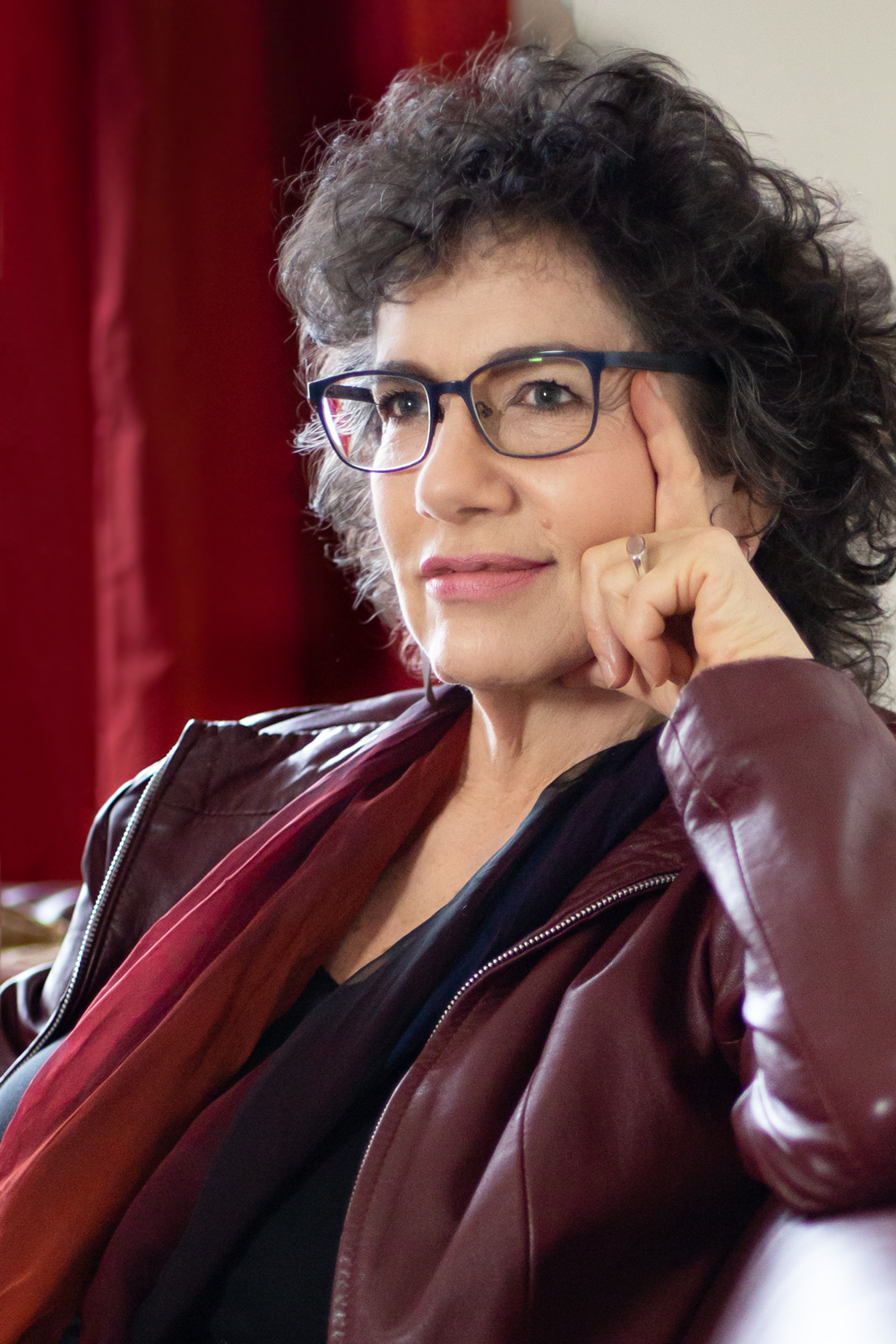
Susan Neiman

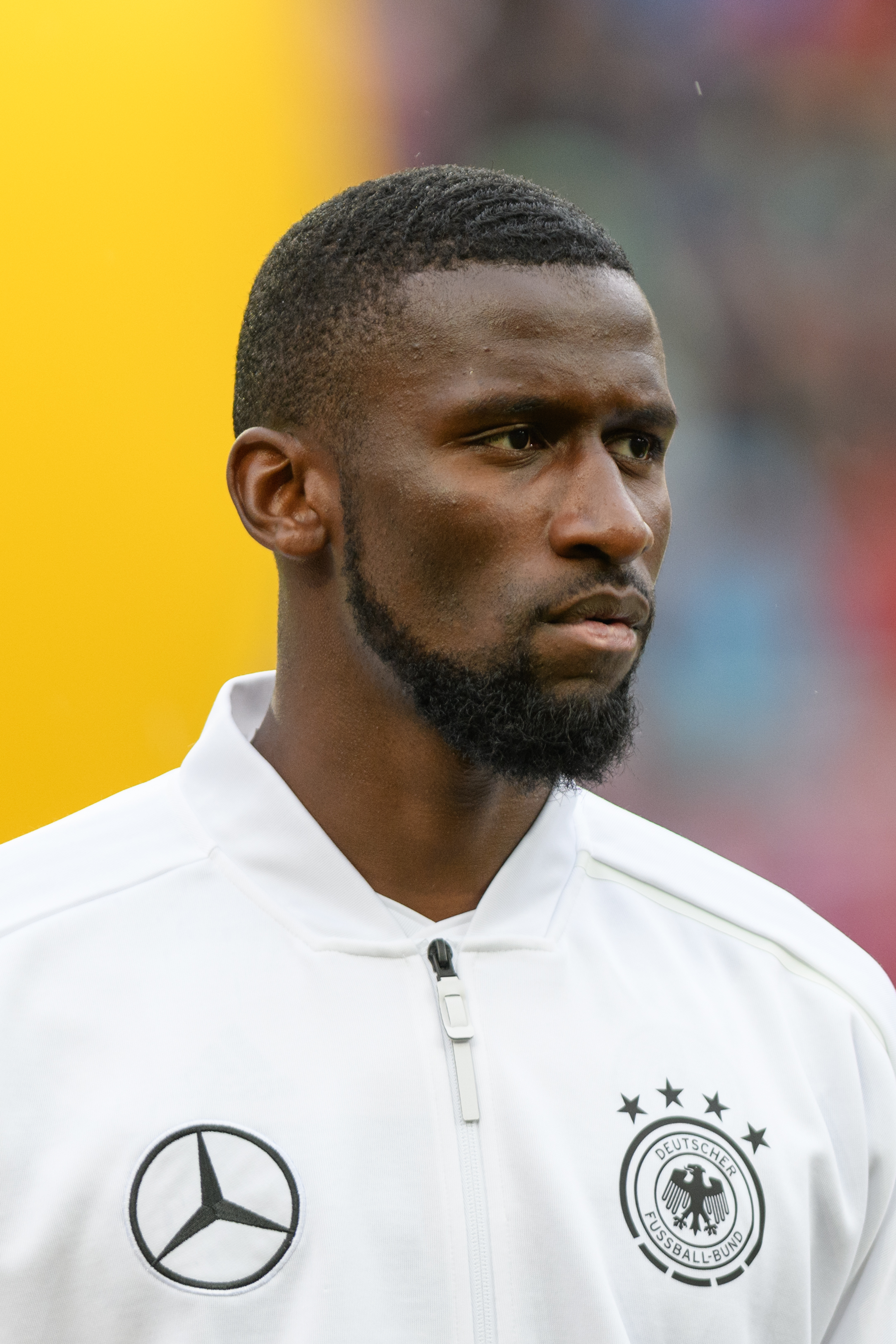
Antonio Rüdiger

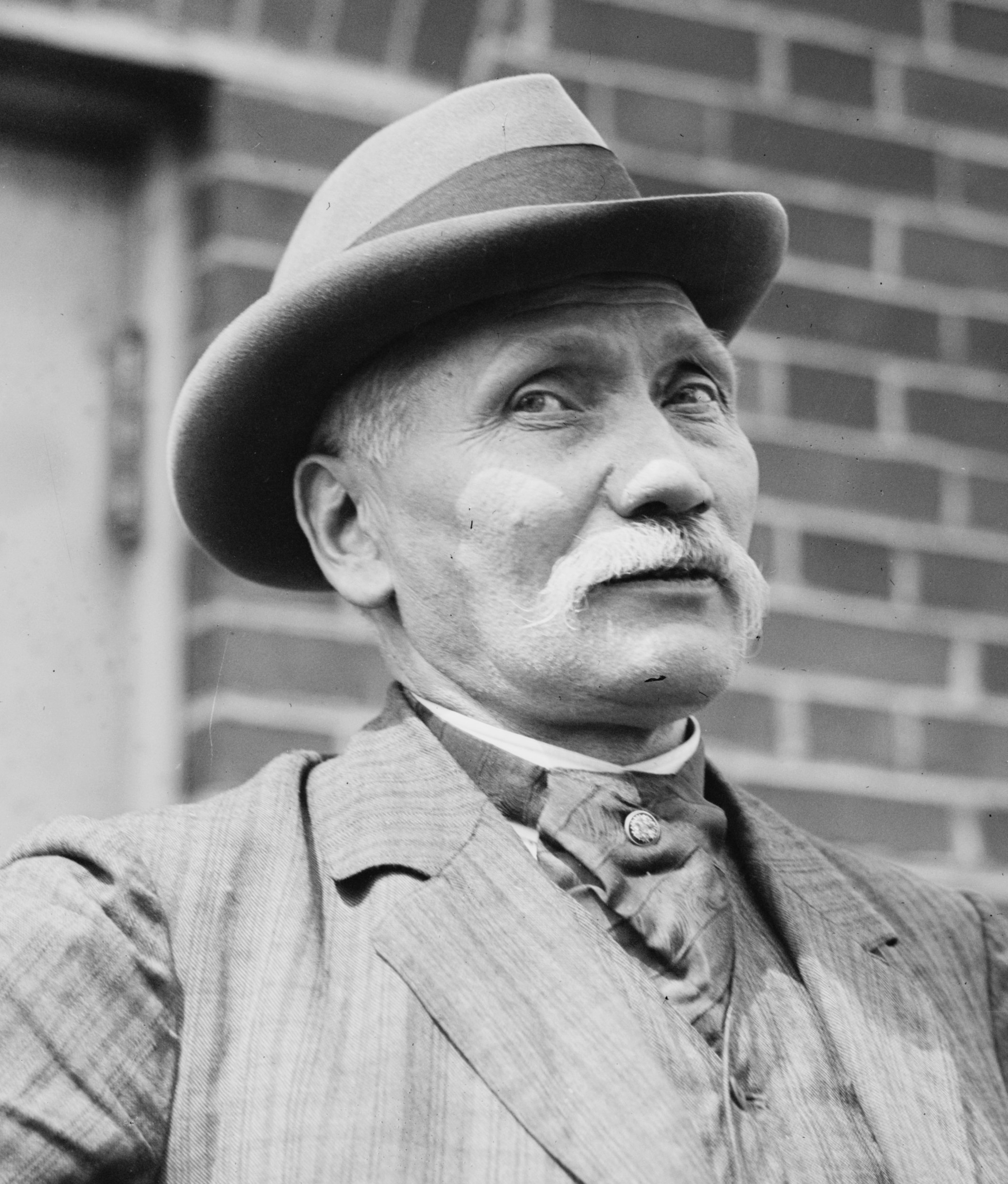
Wilhelm Voigt

Many of Rixdorf's and Neukölln's natives became world-renowned in their respective professions, for example architectural sculptor Lee Lawrie, actor Horst Buchholz, president of Germany's Supreme Court Jutta Limbach, or Real Madrid's centre-back Antonio Rüdiger. Other important people have lived or settled in Rixdorf and Neukölln, for example Bible critic Bruno Bauer, philosopher Susan Neiman, artist Lena Braun, or Wilhelm Voigt, the infamous Captain of Köpenick.

List of notable natives and current or former residents or associates of Rixdorf, Neukölln and Berlin-Neukölln
Name	Profession	Status	Born	Died	Notes
Werberg, Hermann von	other	associated	1324^{[taq]}	1371	Knights Hospitaller commander, governor of Brandenburg, co-founder of Richardsdorf; a.k.a. Hermann von Werberge
Sasar, Dietrich von	other	associated	1360^{[taq]}	1360^{[tpq]}	commander of Tempelhof's Knights Hospitaller, co-founder of Richardsdorf
Frederick William, Elector of Brandenburg	other	associated	1620-02-16	1688-04-29	nobility, general; built a public garden in the forest Hasenheide
Frederick William I of Prussia	other	associated	1688-08-14	1740-05-31	nobility, king of Prussia; patron of the Moravian refugees in Böhmisch-Rixdorf
Liberda, Johann	other	associated	1700-09-05	1742-08-09	theologian, immigrant leader, Bohemian-Lutheran priest
Bewert, Johann Wolfgang	industrialist	native	1700^{[taq]}	1721	brewer, distributor, proprietor of Rixdorf's schultheiß court
Hertzberg, Ewald Friedrich von	politician	associated	1725-09-02	1795-05-22	statesman, proprietor of Rixdorf's schultheiß court (since 1760)
Jahn, Johann Friedrich Ludwig Christoph	other	associated	1778-08-11	1852-10-15	gymnastics educator, publicist, politician, nationalist Anti-Napoleonic liberationist, founder of the German gymnastics movement; built Germany's first public outdoor gymnasium in Neukölln's Hasenheide; a.k.a. Turnvater Jahn
Charles, Prince of Prussia	other	associated	1801-06-29	1883-01-21	nobility, general; built a public garden in the forest Hasenheide
Bauer, Bruno	scientist	resident	1809-09-06	1882-04-13	theologian, historian, philosopher, Bible critic
Müller, Eduard	politician	associated	1818-11-15	1895-01-05	priest, state representative; initiated the foundation of Rixdorf's St. Edward parish
Pannier, Rudolf	jurist	associated	1821-08-31	1897-12-12	president of the Landgericht Berlin (state court); initiated the establishment of Rixdorf's municipal court
Wrede, Wilhelm August Julius	industrialist	resident	1822-01-23	1895-12-28	liquor factory owner, banker; built Neukölln's Juliusburg estate
Prince Handjery, Nicolaus	politician	associated	1836-12-18	1900-12-07	nobility, jurist, county administrator of the Kreis Teltow including Rixdorf (1870–85)
Körner, Franz Wilhelm Theodor	industrialist	native	1838-03-01	1911-06-02	mining industrialist; eponymous owner of the gravel quarry, which became the Körnerpark
Kranold, Viktor Ferdinand von	other	associated	1838-09-19	1922-09-22	railroad executive, KED Berlin president; built Hermannstraße station
Jonas, Ernst Wilhelm Karl Ehrenfried	other	native	1842-09-01	1914-07-24	theologian, Protestant priest at Rixdorf's Church of Mary Magdalene, founder of Rixdorf's first Froebelian kindergarten
Voigt, Friedrich Wilhelm	other	resident	1849-02-13	1922-01-03	con man, impostor, shoemaker; a.k.a. Der Hauptmann von Köpenick (The Captain of Köpenick)
Lisco, Hermann	jurist	resident	1850-01-30	1923-11-07	Rixdorf district judge (1879–83), government official
Ziegra, Hugo	industrialist	resident	1852-03-25	1926-12-28	director of the Kindl brewery (Rollberg), city councilor (until 1919), city elder (1924)
Moras, Walter	artist	native	1856-01-20	1925-03-06	painter
Menken, August Aloysius Johannes	architect	associated	1858-06-23	1903-09-18	built Neukölln's St. John's Basilica
Arons, Leo	scientist	resident	1860-02-15	1919-10-10	physicist, inventor, politician
Geyger, Ernst Moritz	artist	native	1861-11-08	1941-12-29	sculptor, medalist, painter, etcher
Möhring, Bruno	architect	associated	1863-12-11	1929-03-25	urban planner; designed several buildings in Berlin and Neukölln
Fischer, Emil	other	resident	1865	1932	teacher, founder of the Neukölln Museum (1897)
Poppe, Oskar	industrialist	resident	1866-07-09	1918-08-08	chemist, chemical factory manager
Agahd, Konrad Rudolf Friedrich	other	resident	1867-03-01	1926-11-18	pedagogue, author, journalist
Jogiches, Leo	politician	resident	1867-07-17	1919-03-10	Marxist revolutionary, key member of the Spartacus League, KPD co-founder; born Leon Jogiches; a.k.a. Jan Tyszka
Rungius, Carl	artist	native	1869-08-18	1959-10-21	painter
Roß, Heinrich	industrialist	resident	1870-08-13	1957-08-03	postcard manufacturer, publisher, first chairman of the Israelitischer Brüder-Verein Neukölln (1922–34); a.k.a. Heinrich Ross
Luxemburg, Rosa	other	resident	1871-03-05	1919-01-15	Marxist revolutionary and theorist; found refuge in Neukölln with Karl Liebknecht before their execution, probably in the Weisestraße; born Rozalia Luksenburg
Liebknecht, Karl Paul August Friedrich	politician	resident	1871-08-13	1919-01-15	Socialist revolutionary; found refuge in Neukölln with Rosa Luxemburg before their execution, probably in the Weisestraße
Silberstein, Raphael	politician	associated	1873-03-19	1926-08-23	Berlin city councilor (1899–1918); motivated the construction of the Stadtbad Neukölln
Franke, Otto	politician	native	1877-09-15	1953-12-12	unionist, politician, peace activist
Lawrie, Lee Oscar	artist	native	1877-10-16	1963-01-23	architectural sculptor; creator of Atlas; born Max Leo Hugo Belling
Barth, Emil	politician	resident	1879-04-23	1941-07-17	plumber, author, leading November revolutionary, member of the Council of the People's Deputies
Wittbrodt, Wilhelm	other	resident	1879-11-08	1961-05-12	reform pedagogue, politician
Bielicke, Oskar Willy Friedrich	industrialist	resident	1881-09-25	1945-09-23	optics entrepreneur; a.k.a. William Friedrich Bielicke
Schultzenstein, Karl Julius Siegfried	jurist	native	1881-12-15	1951-11-07	district and regional judge, public official, author
Richter, Karl Franz	scientist	resident	1882-08-02	1971-08-01	teacher, classical philologian, Pauly–Wissowa co-author
Treffer, Joseph	politician	resident	1883-05-20	1963-02-08	editor, unionist, communal politician
Schröder, Karl Bernhard Fritz	politician	resident	1884-11-13	1950-04-06	Communist functionary, author, editor, co-founder of the Rote Kämpfer, director of Neukölln's folk high school (1945–49)
Görner, Karl Theodor	industrialist	resident	1884-12-10	1971-08-07	printing company owner, humanitarian, Righteous Among the Nations; aided over 100 German Jews, of which 22 survived, i.a. Inge Deutschkron, during the Shoah with his daughter Hanni Nörper
Grylewicz, Anton	politician	native	1885-01-08	1971-08-02	metalworker, carpenter, Trotskyist, leading November revolutionary, Spartacist insurgent, member of the Reichstag (1924, KPD) and the Landtag of Prussia (1924–28), post-war Social Democrat
Nathan, Helene	other	resident	1885-08-23	1940-10-23	librarian, director of Neukölln's borough library
Karsen, Fritz	other	resident	1885-11-11	1951-08-25	pedagogue, school reformer (comprehensive schooling, second-chance college)
Werkmeister, Lotte	artist	native	1885-12-26	1970-07-15	chanson singer, Kabarett performer, actor
Frederik, Lothar Knud	artist	native	1886-11-09	1957-02-12	screenwriter, film critic; born Friedrich Paul Lothar Fredrik
Glaeser-Wilken, Lisbeth	artist	resident	1887-04-01	1977-04-11	actor, teacher; born Lisbeth Wirtson
Rosebery d'Arguto, Martin	artist	resident	1890-12-24	1942-10 (approx.)	composer, industrial folk musician, conductor, choir director, vocal pedagogue, voice trainer; born Martin Rozenberg; a.k.a. Mosche Rosenberg
Zobeltitz, Gerda von	other	native	1891-06-09	1963-03-29	tailor; one of Germany's first recognized transvestites; born Georg Ernst Hans von Zobeltitz
Seiler, Karl Robert	artist	native	1891-12-06	1971	painter, illustrator, professor
Sorge, Reinhard	artist	native	1892-01-29	1916-07-20	dramatist, poet
Sander, Erwin	other	native	1892-03-05	1962-12-07	Berlin police major, military officer, Wehrmacht general
Piechowski, Paul	other	resident	1892-06-30	1966-06-09	theologian, physician, Protestant priest, religious socialist, chairman of the Union of Socialist Theologians
Rackwitz, Arthur	other	resident	1895-08-04	1980-08-16	Protestant priest, religious socialist, anti-fascist, publicist
Zaschka, Engelbert	scientist	resident	1895-09-01	1955-06-26	engineer, technical designer, inventor, helicopter pioneer
Vetter, Karl Otto Paul	journalist	native	1897-03-18	1957-09-15	author, editor, politician, peace activist, RNZ editor-in-chief
Meisel, Will	artist	native	1897-09-17	1967-04-29	composer, film composer, dancer, publisher
Schuhmann, Walter	politician	resident	1898-04-03	1956-12-02	Nazi Party official, Alter Kämpfer, Neukölln borough section leader, member of the Reichstag (1930–45)
Ley, Gritta	artist	native	1898-08-23	1986-12-17	actor
Baberske, Robert	artist	native	1900-05-01	1958-03-27	cinematographer
Braun, Otto	politician	resident	1900-09-28	1974-08-14	journalist, Communist functionary, Comintern agent, political and military advisor to the CCP; a.k.a. Li De
Bennewitz, Erwin	politician	native	1902-06-05	1980-10-22	mechanic, Treptow borough representative (SPD/GDR), Treptow borough mayor (1946–48)
Riefenstahl, Leni	artist	resident	1902-08-22	2003-09-08	film director, photographer, actor; sister of Heinz; born Helene Bertha Amalie Riefenstahl
Beese, Hertha	politician	resident	1902-09-10	1987-10-15	teacher, Young Socialists (Jusos) co-founder, legislator, Reinickendorf borough councilor (1949–65), Arbeiterwohlfahrt district chairwoman, Berlin city elder (1972); daughter of Gertrud Scholz and Neukölln's third mayor and first borough mayor Alfred Scholz; sister of Arno Scholz; born Hertha Scholz
Roßkopf, Ernst Walter Fritz	artist	native	1903-02-13	1986-07-02	cinematographer
Arendt, Erich	artist	resident	1903-04-15	1984-09-24	teacher, poet, translator
Ulbricht, Lotte	other	native	1903-04-19	2002-03-27	socialist party official; wife of Walter; born Charlotte Kühn
Krause, Klaus Willi	artist	resident	1903-05-02	1976-03-25	actor, voice actor; born Willy Hermann Krause
Larsen, Maximilian	artist	native	1904-02-13	1975-01-13	actor, voice actor; born Max Fritz Bruno Schwenkner
Scholz, Arno	journalist	native	1904-02-22	1971-07-30	journalist, publicist, publisher; son of Gertrud Scholz and Neukölln's third mayor and first borough mayor Alfred Scholz; brother of Hertha Beese
Wolke, Bruno	athlete	native	1904-05-04	1973-12-23	road bicycle racer
Wichmann, Hans	athlete	native	1905-01-28	1981-09-23	middle-distance runner
Wöhrn, Fritz Oskar Karl	other	native	1905-03-12	1979-12-18	police officer, SS Hauptsturmführer, Eichmannreferat administrator
Rall, Adolf Anselm	other	native	1905-06-07	1933-11-02	trucker, SA member, murdered Reichstag fire whistleblower
Stasiewski, Bernhard	scientist	native	1905-11-14	1995-07-01	historian, Catholic priest
Muchow, Reinhold	politician	resident	1905-12-21	1933-09-12	National Socialist grassroots organizer, Alter Kämpfer, Berlin organizational party leader; founded the Neukölln Model of independently operating cells, applied Berlin-wide in 1932
Riefenstahl, Heinz	scientist	native	1906-03-05	1944-07-20	engineer; brother of Leni
Schmidt, Charles	politician	native	1906-06-03	1971-12-02	tobacco merchant, Berlin state representative
Wolke, Rudolf Paul	athlete	native	1906-06-09	1979-03-12	racing cyclist
Schmidt, Paul Otto Bruno	other	native	1906-08-16	1942-10-19	criminal, central figure of the Blomberg–Fritsch affair
Hübner, Walter	other	native	1906-08-24	1969	precision engineer, major of the Neukölln SA
Winkler, Gerhard	artist	native	1906-09-12	1977-09-25	composer, film composer, songwriter
Bardtke, Hans Walter Kurt	scientist	native	1906-09-22	1975-03-08	Protestant theologian, classical historian
Taylor, John Wilkinson	other	resident	1906-09-26	2001-12-11	educator, director general of UNESCO (1952–53)
Heltzel, Rudolf	artist	resident	1907-01-14	2005-06-10	painter, sculptor
Ardenne, Manfred Baron von	scientist	resident	1907-01-20	1997-05-26	researcher, applied physicist, nuclear physicist, inventor, politician
Borchert, Ernst Wilhelm	artist	native	1907-03-13	1990-06-01	actor, voice actor
Haegert, Wilhelm	jurist	native	1907-03-14	1994-04-24	lawyer, NS ministry official
Schmidt, Karl Oswald Willi	other	resident	1907-05-02	1972-03-08	SA leader, member of the Neukölln chapter; a.k.a. as Schweinebacke
Bluhm, Walter	artist	native	1907-08-05	1976-12-02	actor, voice actor
Lehmann, Hans Heinz	scientist	native	1907-08-13	1985-06-06	historian, anglicist
Mießner, Rudolf	journalist	native	1907-11-07	1973-01-16	Communist functionary, politician, editor-in-chief of i.a. Junge Welt (1947–49), East German radio and TV line producer
Benário Prestes, Olga	other	resident	1908-02-12	1942-04-07	stenographer, YCI and KJVD activist, Communist militant; born Olga Gutmann Benário
Seibt, Kurt	politician	native	1908-02-13	2002-06-21	Communist functionary, East German Minister for Direction and Control of Regional and District Councils (1964–65), chairman of the SED Central Revision Commission (1967–89)
Persson, Rosl	other	native	1908-02-29	2010-01-03	women's sports pioneer, alpinist, gymnastics coach, clerk, traveling acrobat, singer and musician; born Rosl Pauli
Pannek, Bruno Willy	artist	resident	1908-12-08	1984-04-23	precision engineer, amateur actor, member of the Loriot ensemble
Hilliger, Otto	artist	native	1909	1987	pianist, composer, choir director
Rossow, Walter	architect	native	1910-01-28	1992-01-02	landscape architect, university professor, author; central figure in Berlin's post-war reconstruction
Thiemann, Elsa	artist	resident	1910-02-07	1981-11-15	photographer, designer; born Elsa Franke
Lehnert, Martin	scientist	native	1910-05-20	1992-03-04	anglicist, professor
Meysel, Inge	artist	native	1910-05-30	2004-07-10	actor, voice actor
Leuschner, Bruno Max	politician	native	1910-08-12	1965-02-10	industrial clerk, East German Communist politician and functionary
Lüdke, Johannes Jakobus Michael	artist	native	1910-10-23	1972-05-11	documentary film director, film editor
Weckerling, Rudolf	other	resident	1911-05-03	2014-01-31	Protestant priest, peace activist
Ludwig, Hermann	artist	native	1911-07-27	1982-02-22	film editor, film production manager
Lewin, Fridl	politician	native	1911-09-15	2004-07-02	bookbinder, socialist activist (SAJ, SPD, later SED), FDJ co-founder and central committee delegate (1946–49), East German functionary; later Fridl Hensel-Lewin
Nicklitz, Walter	politician	native	1911-11-28	1989-10-04	mason, architect, magistrate, building official, state representative, deputy mayor of Berlin (SPD, 1959–65)
Meudtner, Ilse	athlete	resident	1912-11-01	1990-07-18	diver, dancer, choreographer, journalist
Ziegler, Walter	jurist	native	1912-11-05	1977-02-20	East German Supreme Court chief justice (First Senate, 1950–62)
Schipulle, Hans	artist	native	1913-03-13	1977-08-12	film editor, documentary filmmaker
Voelker, Alexander	politician	native	1913-08-01	2001-02-24	industrial business manager, Berlin state representative, city elder of Berlin (1980)
Bergmann, Erika	other	native	1915-01-03	1996	concentration camp guard, murderer; born Erika Belling
Rahl, Mady	artist	native	1915-01-03	2009-08-29	actor, voice actor, singer
Szelinski-Singer, Katharina	artist	resident	1918-05-24	2010-12-20	sculptor; born Katharina Singer
Ihle, Hans Joachim	artist	native	1919-12-21	1997-12-15	sculptor
Ebener, Dietrich	scientist	native	1920-02-14	2011-07-13	classical philologian, author, translator
Lipinski, Rudi	scientist	native	1920-03-26	2002-07-13	historian, annalist
Weizsäcker, Richard Karl Freiherr von	politician	associated	1920-04-15	2015-01-31	Neukölln representative (CDU, 1979–84), Governing Mayor of West Berlin (1981–84), President of Germany (1984–94)
Edel, Peter	artist	native	1921-07-12	1983-05-07	graphic artist, author; born Hans Peter Hirschweh
Wolff, Friedrich	jurist	native	1922-07-30	2024-06-10	lawyer, East German official
Fischer-Fabian, S.	journalist	resident	1922-09-22	2011-11-16	novelist, non-fiction author, journalist; born Siegfried Fischer
Schäfer, Gerd E.	artist	native	1923-07-14	2001-09-20	actor, Kabarett satirist; born Gerhard Kurt Egilhard Schäfer
Kieling, Wolfgang	artist	native	1924-03-16	1985-10-07	actor, voice actor
Schulz, Paul	other	resident	1925-07-08	2013-02-25	Posadist political theorist, Socialist activist, ufologist, metallurgist
Bröker, Fredi	other	associated	1925-11-12	1955-07-05	chimney sweep, Anti-Communist, possible German intelligence agent; died in Neukölln as a casualty of the Berlin Wall border regime; a.k.a. Wolfgang Pankow
Möller, Gunnar	artist	native	1928-07-01	2017-05-16	actor
Rüster, Lothar	jurist	native	1930-01-22	2010-01-08	jurist, author, professor, East German official
Nieswandt, Erich	journalist	native	1930-12-30	2008-11-18	radio host, reporter, voice actor
Fiebach, Helmut	athlete	native	1933-08-08	2016-07-28	footballer, baker, chauffeur, storeowner
Gruner, Joachim	artist	native	1933-08-18	2011-09-23	composer, musician
Buchholz, Horst	artist	native	1933-12-04	2003-03-03	actor, voice actor
Peters, Gerd	artist	native	1934-01-09	2023-02-23	actor, author, journalist, naval officer
Limbach, Jutta	jurist	native	1934-03-27	2016-09-10	jurist, professor, Berlin Senator of Justice, president of the Federal Constitutional Court and Goethe-Institut
Jercha, Heinz	other	resident	1934-07-01	1962-03-27	butcher, Berlin Wall escape agent
Oefelein, Rainer	architect	associated	1935-08-23	2011-01-19	built Neukölln's High-Deck-Siedlung with Bernhard Freund
Abraham, Peter	artist	native	1936-01-19	2015-02-06	author, screenwriter, line producer, theater critic; a.k.a. Karl Georg von Löffelholz
Mann, Rahel Renate	other	native	1937-06-07	2022-03-31	physician, psychotherapist, lyricist, Shoah survivor; born Renate Wolf
Müller, Klaus	athlete	native	1938-01-26		team handball player and coach
Bosetzky, Horst	artist	resident	1938-02-01	2018-09-16	author, novelist, sociologist
Brehmer, KP	artist	native	1938-09-12	1997-12-16	painter, graphic artist, filmmaker; born Klaus Peter Brehmer
Kulpok, Alexander	journalist	resident	1938-11-13		radio journalist & presenter, author, German Videotext editor-in-chief
Fuchs, Wolfgang	other	resident	1939-01-08	2001-06-07	drugstore owner, Berlin Wall escape agent
Giesen, Traugott	other	resident	1940-05-06		theologian, priest, Christian author
Radeke, Winfried	artist	resident	1940-11-30		composer, cantor, conductor, director; founder and art director of the Neukölln Opera
Zander, Frank	artist	native	1942-02-04		singer, presenter, actor
Landowsky, Klaus-Rüdiger	politician	native	1942-07-21		Berlin state representative (CDU, 1975–2001), Berlin Hyp chairman (1993–2001, resigned amidst the Berlin Banking Scandal)
Sgonina, Alexander	artist	native	1943		sculptor, physicist, radio engineer; born Willi Alexander Godenrath
Rennert, Jürgen	artist	native	1943-03-12		author, poet, essayist, translator
Schmitt, Walfriede	artist	native	1943-03-26		actor, voice actor, author
Roski, Ulrich	artist	resident	1944-03-04	2003-02-20	musician, singer-songwriter
Ettlich, Wolfgang	artist	native	1947-05-26		film director
Vogel, Peter	scientist	native	1947-08-31		pedagogue, professor
Kolland, Dorothea	scientist	associated	1947-10-31		musicologist, director of Neukölln's Kulturamt (Culture Office, 1983–2012); born Dorothea Keupp
Buchholz, Werner	scientist	native	1948-01-25		historian, professor
Moessinger, Irene	other	resident	1949-10-14		nurse, cultural manager, equine-assisted therapist; founder and former director of the Tempodrom
Kalkowski, Kalle	artist	native	1950-01-20		singer, musician, painter; born Gottfried Kalkowski
Funke, Arno Martin Franz	artist	resident	1950-03-14		graphic artist, author, former extortionist; a.k.a. Dagobert
Strätz, Harald	artist	native	1951-07-17	2013-06-19	author, broadcast writer
Kapielski, Thomas Alfred Franz	artist	resident	1951-09-16		author, visual artist, musician
Weckman, Joachim	industrialist	resident	1953-10-04		entrepreneur, organic food pioneer
Sazak, Selçuk	artist	resident	1954-03-16		actor, Turkish film festival director
Haule, Eva Sybille	other	resident	1954-07-16		photographer, former Red Army Faction terrorist; a.k.a. Eva Sybille Haule-Frimpong
Hasucha, Christian	artist	native	1955		street and installation artist
Walz, Brigitte Annemarie	scientist	associated	1955-02-16		ethnologist; co-founded the Karneval der Kulturen with Anett Szabó at Neukölln's Werkstatt der Kulturen
Neiman, Susan	scientist	resident	1955-03-27		author, moral philosopher, essayist, cultural commentator
Wendt, Michael	politician	resident	1955-12-01	2011-12-22	mechanical engineer, foundational member of the Berlin Alternative Liste
Krawczyk, Stephan	artist	resident	1955-12-31		author, songwriter, East-German dissident
Steinmeier, Frank-Walter	politician	associated	1956-01-05		jurist, Minister of Foreign Affairs (SPD, 2013–17), President of Germany (since 2017), active member of the Reformed Evangelical Bethlehem parish in Böhmisch-Rixdorf
Kinsky, Esther	artist	resident	1956-09-12		author, translator
Barkow, Frank	architect	associated	1957		built the Estrel Tower with Regine Leibinger
Şenalp, Hilmi	architect	associated	1957		built Neukölln's Şehitlik Mosque
Feddersen, Jan	journalist	resident	1957-07-14		social economist, reporter, editor of Die Tageszeitung
Eryilmaz, Abdullah	artist	resident	1958		author, songwriter, bookseller
Farin, Klaus	artist	resident	1958-04-20		author, publisher, anti-discrimination activist, co-founder of PEN Berlin
Lilienthal, Matthias	artist	native	1959-12-21		director, theater manager, dramaturge, journalist
Bolien, Michael	other	native	1960-09-18		radio host, programmer, engineer, teacher
Knie, Andreas	scientist	resident	1960-12-12		sociologist, professor, traffic researcher
Braun, Lena	artist	resident	1961-04-04		performance and visual artist, curator, author
Verschuer, Leopold von	artist	resident	1961-04-09		actor, voice actor, author, theater and radio drama director, translator
Heisig, Kirsten	jurist	associated	1961-08-24	2010-06-28	Neukölln judge, author; propagated the procedural Neukölln Model
Garweg, Burkhard Maria Heimfried	other	resident	1961-09-01		fugitive, criminal suspect, radical left-wing activist, former member of the Red Army Faction terrorist group
Demirbüken-Wegner, Emine	politician	resident	1961-09-07		journalist, integration commissioner (Tempelhof-Schöneberg), borough mayor of Reinickendorf (since 2023, CDU); born Emine Demirbüken
Tuckermann, Anja	artist	resident	1961-11-24		author, novelist, journalist
Weisse, Simon	artist	associated	1962		filmmaker, model maker, property master, set designer
Traub, Franziska	artist	resident	1962-08-03		actor, Kabarett satirist
Juwelia	artist	resident	1963-01-14		drag queen, singer, painter, gallery owner; a.k.a. Juwelia Soraya; born Stefan Stricker
Benedict, Peter	artist	resident	1963-07-13		actor, film director; born Christian Riss
Lieschied, Uwe	other	associated	1963-09-21	2006-03-21	murdered police chief superintendent
Sahihi, Ashkan	artist	resident	1963-11-27		photographer
Darabi Kazeruni, Kazem	other	resident	1964		Iranian intelligence agent, Hezbollah representative; convicted for the Mykonos restaurant assassinations (1992)
Kay, Manuela	journalist	native	1964-04-02		author, publisher, journalist, filmmaker, radio host, Siegessäule editor-in-chief (1996–2005)
Betz, Martin	artist	resident	1964-06-17		political satirist, musician, author
Herrndorf, Wolfgang	artist	resident	1965-06-12	2013-08-26	author, painter, illustrator, caricaturist
Hannemann, Uli	artist	resident	1965-08-25		author, columnist
Hacke, Alexander	artist	native	1965-10-11		musician, singer, music producer, filmmaker
Krüger, Roland	other	associated	1966-04-06	2006-04-27	murdered police superintendent; a.k.a. Boulette
Sallmann, Bernhard	artist	resident	1967		documentary film director
Meißner, Tobias Oliver	artist	resident	1967-08-04		novelist, cartoonist
Reding, Benjamin	artist	resident	1969-01-03		film director, screenwriter, author
Schreifels, Walter Arthur	artist	resident	1969-03-10		musician, singer
Hermann, Judith	artist	resident	1970-05-15		author
Sterblich, Ulrike	artist	native	1970-09-01		author, columnist, radio host
Röggla, Kathrin	artist	resident	1971-06-14		author, radio drama and theater writer
Wagner, Jan	artist	resident	1971-10-18		poet, essayist, translator
Wedhorn, Tanja	artist	resident	1971-12-14		actor
Ziege, Christian	athlete	native	1972-02-01		footballer, football manager
Blomberg, Sebastian	artist	resident	1972-05-24		actor
Dege, Timo	artist	resident	1973		street poet, author
Metschurat, Barnaby	artist	native	1974-09-22		actor
Lucic, Nenad	artist	resident	1974-09-24		actor
Burns, Barry	artist	resident	1974-11-14		musician
Krömer, Kurt	artist	native	1974-11-20		comedian, actor, presenter, author; born Alexander Bojcan
Topal, Murat	artist	native	1975		comedian, Kabarett satirist, former police officer
Balcı, Güner Yasemin	journalist	native	1975-02-09		journalist, author, documentary film director; Neukölln's integration commissioner (since 2020)
Winson	artist	resident	1975-03-04		musician, radio host, podcaster; born Marcus Winson
Alexander, Robin	journalist	resident	1975-05-13		reporter, journalist, author
Buß, Martin	athlete	resident	1976-04-07		high jumper
MOK	artist	native	1976-09-21		rapper, musician; born Tarkan Karaalioğlu
Khani, Behzad Karim	artist	resident	1977		author, journalist
Nathan, Sascha	artist	resident	1977-05-04		actor
Chérif, Karim	artist	resident	1977-05-31		actor
Tarééc	artist	native	1978-07-03		R&B singer, musician; f.k.a. T-Soul; born Tarek Hussein
Redler, Lucy	politician	resident	1979-08-17		Trotskyist activist (ISA, Anti-capitalist Left), national party executive (Die Linke, 2016–21); a.k.a. rote Lucy ("red Lucy")
Pabst, Pamela	jurist	resident	1978-10-29		Germany's first blind attorney-at-law
Parka, Jurassica	artist	native	1979-10-17		drag queen, show host, entertainer, author; born Mario Olszinski
Soze, Keyza	artist	resident	1980		composer, music producer, DJ; a.k.a. Verbal Kint; born Konrad Karkos
Zillmann, Daniel	artist	resident	1981-01-18		actor, voice actor, singer
Jagla, Jan-Hendrik	athlete	resident	1981-05-25		basketball player
Herzberg, Martin	artist	native	1981-05-28		musician, composer, musicologist
Uddenberg, Anna	artist	resident	1982		sculpturist
Melendiz	artist	native	1982-06-14		musician, composer; born Volkan Melendiz
Berrached, Anne Zohra	artist	resident	1982-07-31		film director, screenwriter
Akboga, Kazim	artist	resident	1982-08-20	2017-02-09	musician, rapper, singer, DJ, commercial video writer & producer; born Kazım Akboğa
Hızarcı, Derviş	other	native	1983		teacher, author, Berlin integration commissioner (2019–20)
Schazad, Graziella	artist	resident	1983-07-02		musician, singer-songwriter
Sukini	artist	resident	1983-12-29		musician, columnist, rapper; f.k.a. Sookee and Quing of Berlin; born Nora Hantzsch
Naumann, Henrike	artist	resident	1984	2026-02-14	installation artist
Otremba, Hendrik	artist	resident	1984-09-21		musician, author, visual artist
Stoehrfaktor, Lena	artist	resident	1984		musician, rapper, social worker, educator; born Lena Stoehr
Bumaye, Ali	artist	resident	1985-01-11		musician, rapper; born Ali Alulu Abdul-razzak
Senesie, Sahr	athlete	resident	1985-06-20		footballer; half-brother of Antonio Rüdiger
Schuch, Albrecht	artist	resident	1985-08-21		actor
Stokowski, Margarete	artist	resident	1986-04-14		author, essayist
Özdemir, Oktay	artist	resident	1986-10-06		actor, theater author; born İnanç Oktay Özdemir
Then, Felicitas	journalist	resident	1986-11-29		journalist, editor, TV cook
Mondtag, Ersan	artist	resident	1987		theater and opera director; born Ersan Aygün
Amjahid, Mohamed	journalist	resident	1988		non-fiction author, journalist, reporter
Gringo	artist	native	1988		musician, rapper; born Ilfan Kalender
Aikins, Jonathan Kwesi	artist	resident	1989-01-22		actor, voice actor
Herman, Rony	artist	resident	1990		actor
Janta, Oumi	other	resident	1991		jam skater, model, influencer
Kobosil	artist	native	1991-04-05		DJ, music producer, musician; born Max Kobosil
Zeuge, Tyron	athlete	native	1992-05-12		professional boxer
Hmeidan, Kenda	artist	resident	1992-09-13		actor, voice actor
Juju	artist	resident	1992-11-20		musician, rapper; born Judith Wessendorf
Rüdiger, Antonio	athlete	native	1993-03-03		footballer; half-brother of Sahr Senesie; a.k.a. El Loco, Don Antonio and Toni Rüdiger
Lou, Alice Phoebe	artist	resident	1993-07-19		musician, singer-songwriter; born Alice Matthew
Lang, Ricarda	politician	resident	1994-01-17		MdB (Alliance 90/The Greens, since 2021), co-deputy party leader (2022–24)
Juno, Madeline	artist	resident	1995-08-11		musician, singer-songwriter; born Madeline Obrigewitsch
Ngee	artist	native	1996		musician, rapper; born Nikolas Schüssler
Kayil, Jack	athlete	resident	2006-01-27		basketball player

== Resistance against National Socialism ==
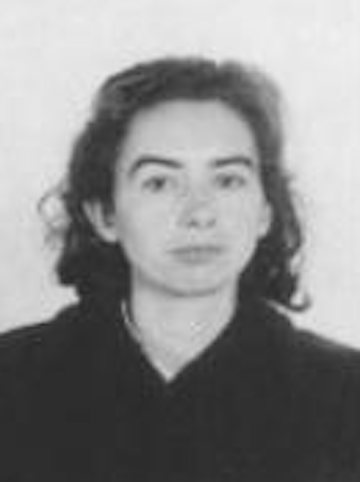
Ursula Goetze

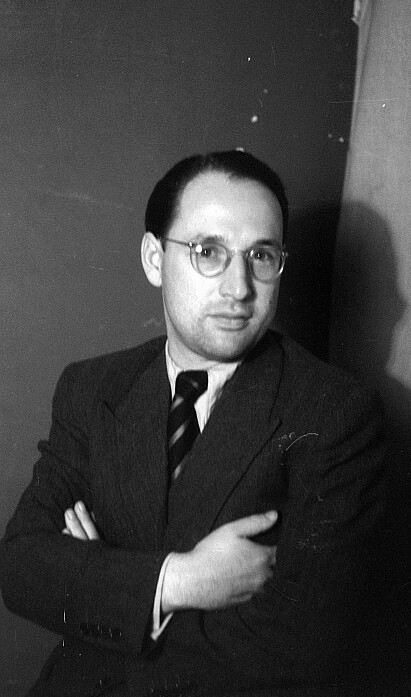
Klaus Gysi

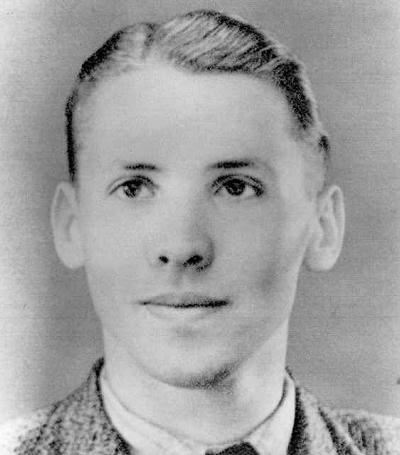
Heinz Kapelle

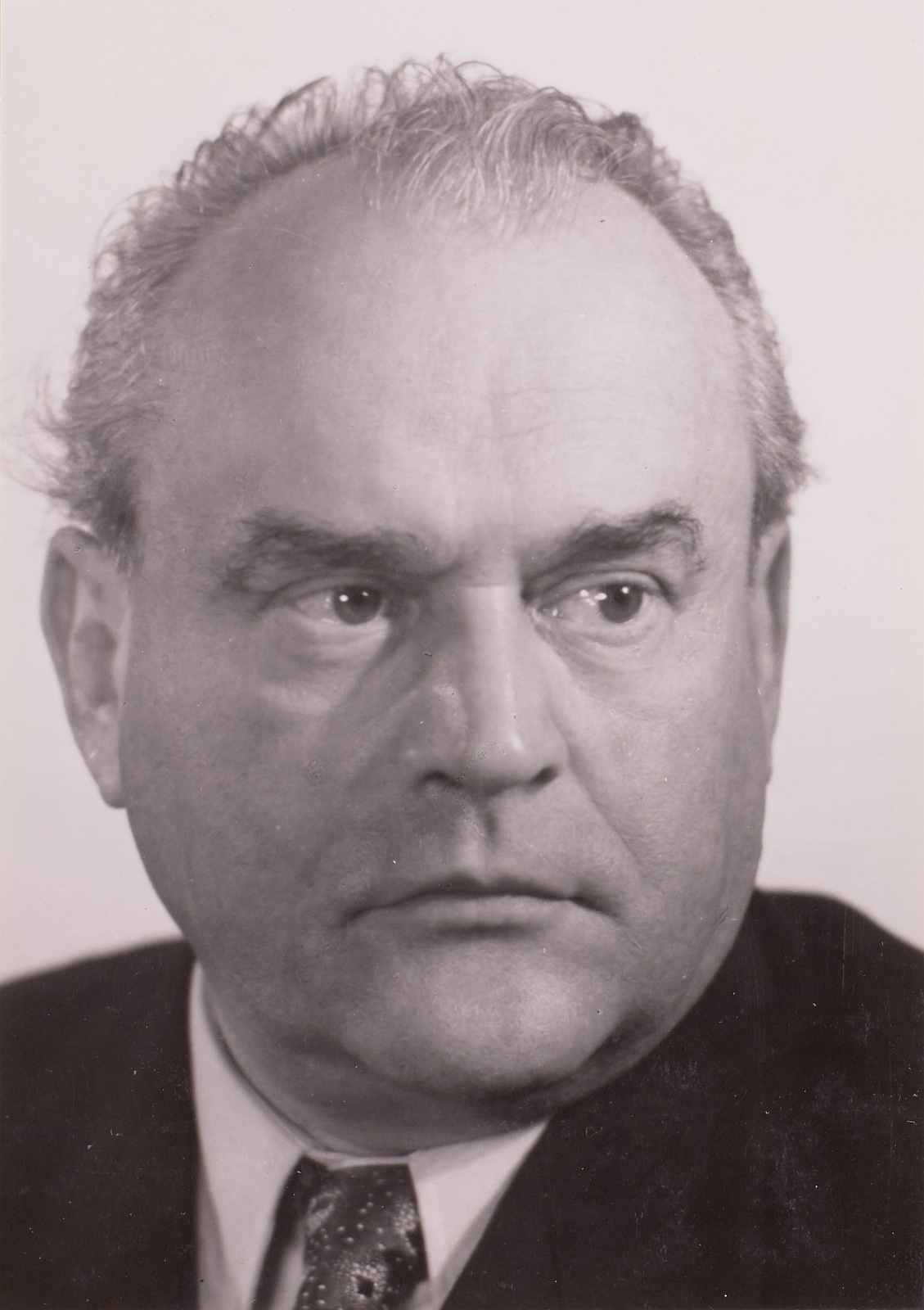
Fritz Lange

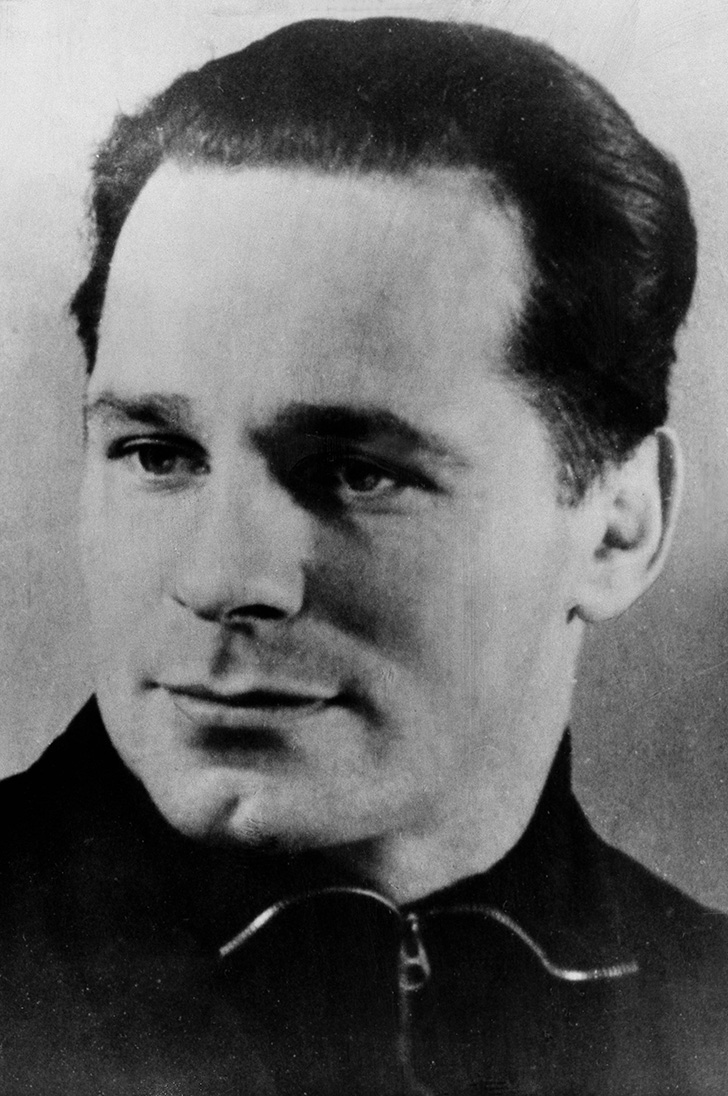
Werner Seelenbinder

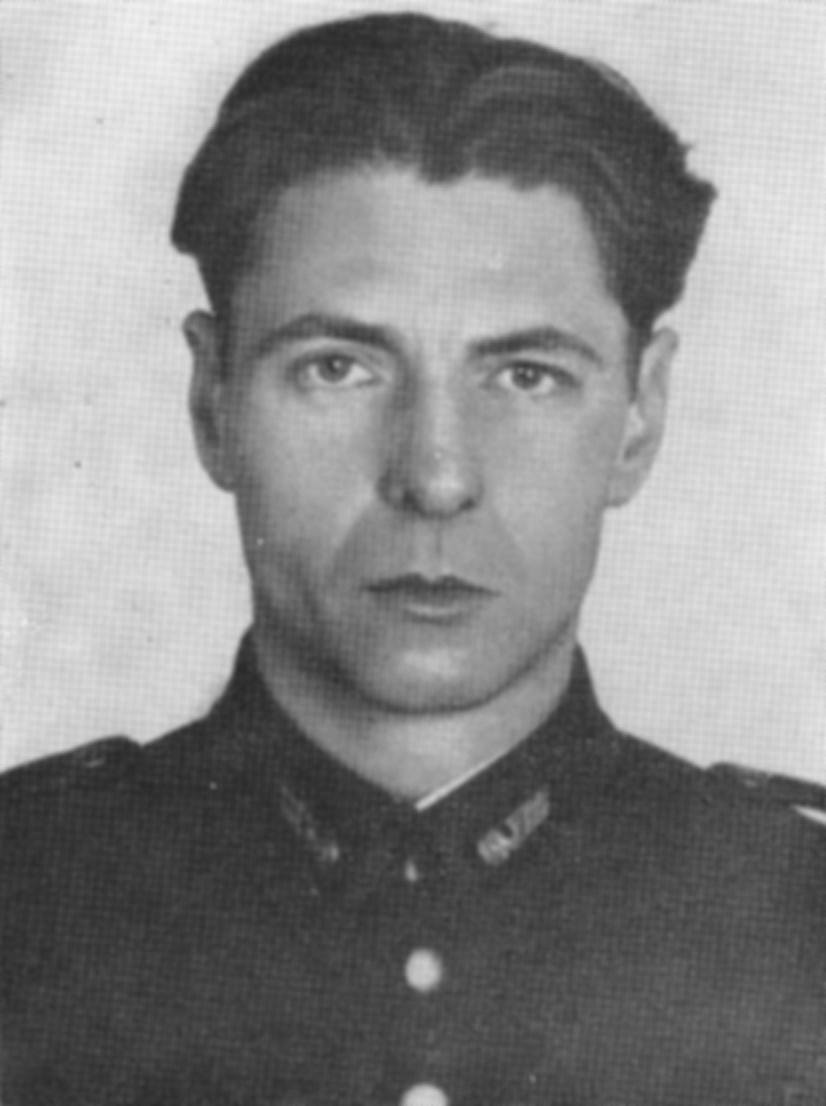
John Sieg

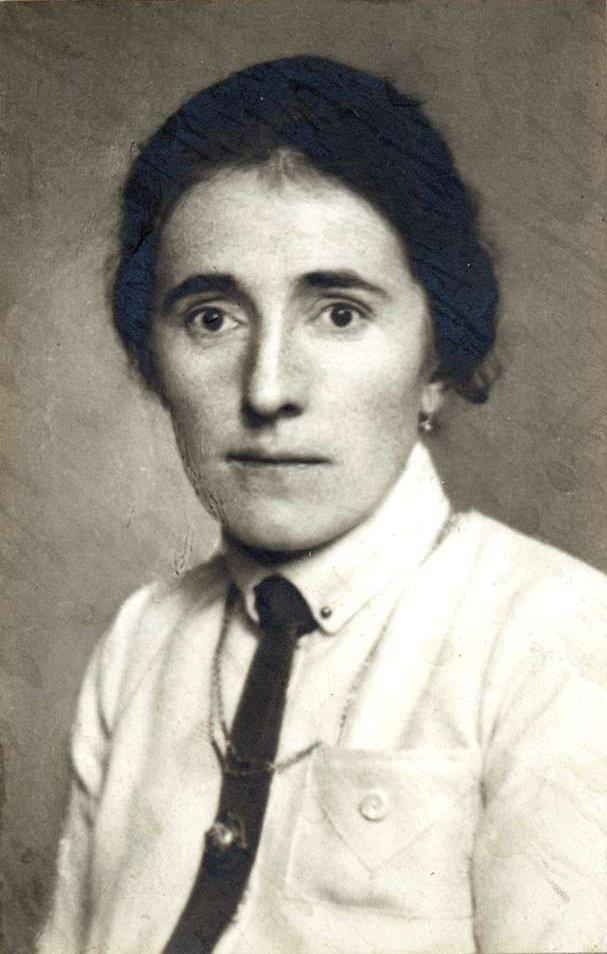
Frieda Unger

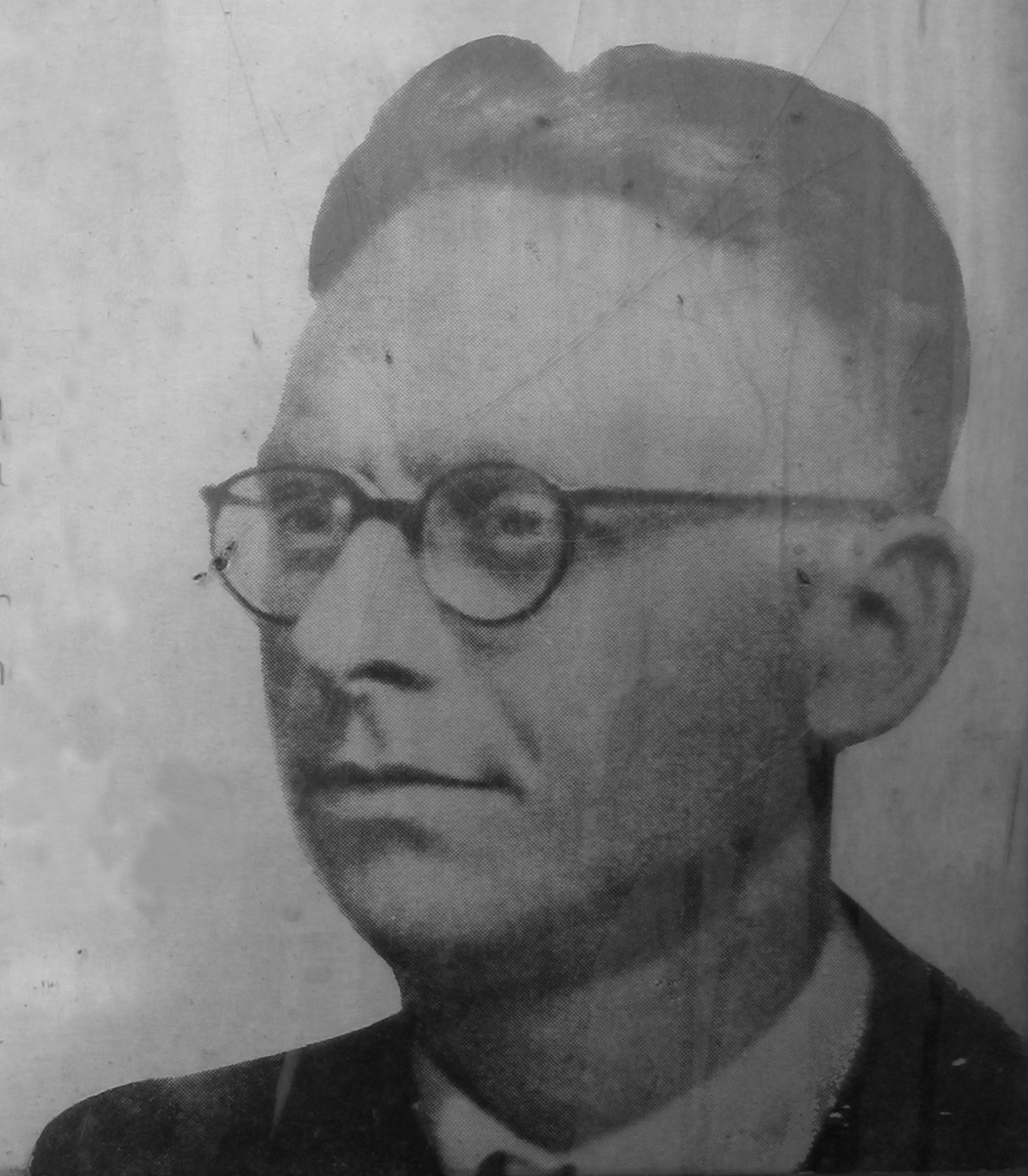
Martin Weise

Many of Germany's resistance fighters and activists against National Socialist rule operated from Neukölln, for example Heinz Kapelle and Ursula Goetze, who coordinated with the Red Orchestra in the quarter. Some activists also moved to socialist East Germany after World War II and became prominent state officials and politicians, for example Klaus Gysi and Frieda Unger.

List of notable resistance activists and fighters against National Socialism in Berlin-Neukölln
Name	Status	Born	Died	Profession and notes
Hermann, Albert Reinhold Richard	resident	1885-11-10	1945-04-29	pressman, unionist
Künstler, Franz	resident	1888-05-13	1942-09-10	mechanic, unionist, politician
Unger, Frieda	resident	1888-07-09	1975-04-12	politician, East German functionary; born Frieda Eckert
Sahlberg, Clara	native	1890-07-03	1977-04-13	tailor, unionist
Boock, Georg	resident	1891-09-06	1961-06-23	Neukölln administrator, mayor of i.a. Erfurt (1946–61)
Lange, Emil Alfred Fritz	resident	1898-11-23	1981-09-16	teacher, Communist borough and city representative
Bischoff, Fritz	native	1900-07-01	1945-05-03	salesman, Communist functionary; husband of Charlotte
Kühn, Bruno	native	1901-12-17	1944 (approx.)	Communist functionary; brother of Lotte Ulbricht
Glatzer, Helene	native	1902-02-08	1935-01-31	clerk
Rathmann, Anna	native	1902-02-15	1992-10-08	metalworker, Neukölln borough representative (KPD), Lichtenberg district chairwoman (SED); sister of Gertrud Rosenmeyer; born Anna Helene Rosenmeyer
Sieg, John	resident	1903-02-03	1942-10-15	Communist railroad worker, journalist; leading member of the Red Orchestra; pseudonymously a.k.a. Siegfried Nebel
Weise, Martin	resident	1903-05-12	1943-11-15	journalist, borough representative (1929–33)
Kapteina, Hugo	resident	1903-06-23	1945-04-20	journalist
Seelenbinder, Werner	associated	1904-08-02	1944-10-24	wrestler; trained and is buried in Neukölln
Schröder, Georg	native	1904-10-10	1944-09-11	blacksmith, welder
Rosenmeyer, Gertrud "Trude"	native	1904-10-19	1982-09-16	assembler, Neukölln borough representative (KPD), post-war Neukölln KPD chairwoman, Lichtenberg district secretary (SED); sister of Anna Rathmann; partner of Wilhelm Kling
Jahnke, Willi	native	1906-08-29	1992-01-01	merchant, unionist, Communist functionary, borough mayor of Lichtenberg (1955–59, SED) and Prenzlauer Berg (1964–69)
Siedentopf, Hedwig	native	1909-08-22	1994	sewer, member of the Uhrig–Römer resistance group, Kreuzberg district officer, SED member
Loll, Ferdinand	native	1910-03-08	1986-08-05	shipping agent, Communist activist, GDR police officer; convicted for the Richardsburg attack (1931)
Crüger, Tommy	native	1911-05-17	2003-01-17	Communist functionary, politician; born Herbert Crüger
Hesse, Eberhard	native	1911-06-28	1986-03-28	printer, chairman of Neukölln's SAJ, unionist, Berlin state representative (1956–75, SPD)
Gysi, Klaus	native	1912-03-03	1999-03-06	journalist, publisher, politician; father of Gregor
Hoffmann, Friedel	native	1912-12-14	1997-12-26	Socialist functionary, East German political official; born Friedel Schmiedel; later a.k.a. Friedel Lange
Tschäpe, Herbert	native	1913-01-15	1944-11-27	construction worker, carpenter, Communist functionary
Walter, Grete	native	1913-02-22	1935-10-21	Communist youth worker
Kapelle, Heinz	resident	1913-09-17	1941-07-01	pressman, Communist politician
Jadamowitz, Hildegard	native	1916-02-12	1942-08-18	factory worker, salesclerk, medical assistant, Communist functionary; a.k.a. Hilde Jadamowitz; born Hildegard Jadamowicz
Goetze, Ursula	resident	1916-03-29	1943-08-05	stenographer
Walter, Irene	native	1919-01-23	1942-08-18	secretary
Rehmer, Friedrich	native	1921-06-02	1943-05-13	locksmith, adjuster, teacher

== Mayors and other local politicians ==
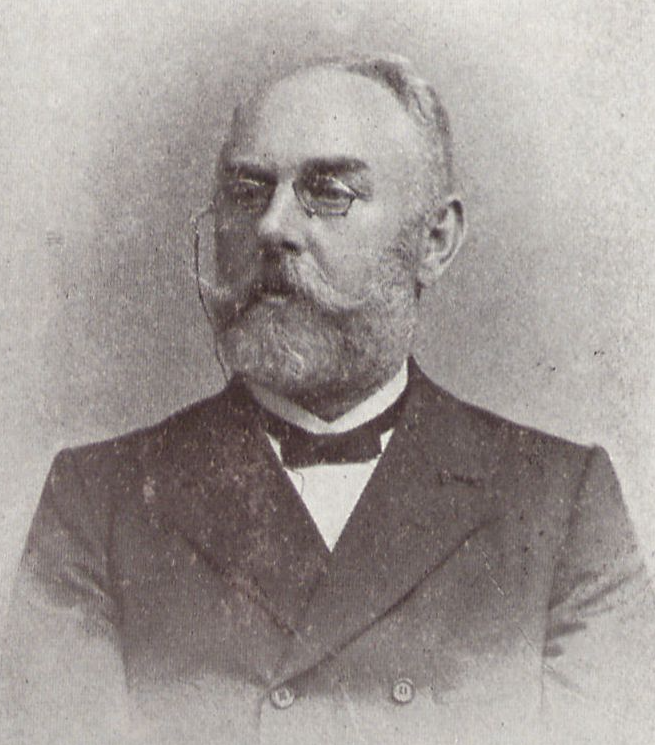
Hermann Boddin

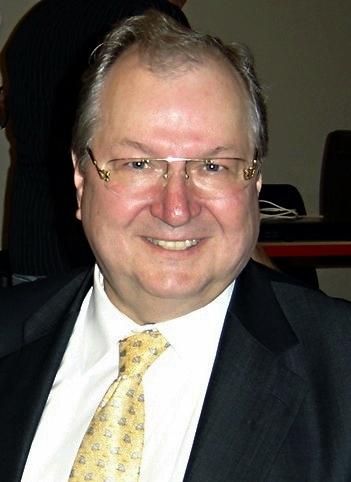
Heinz Buschkowsky

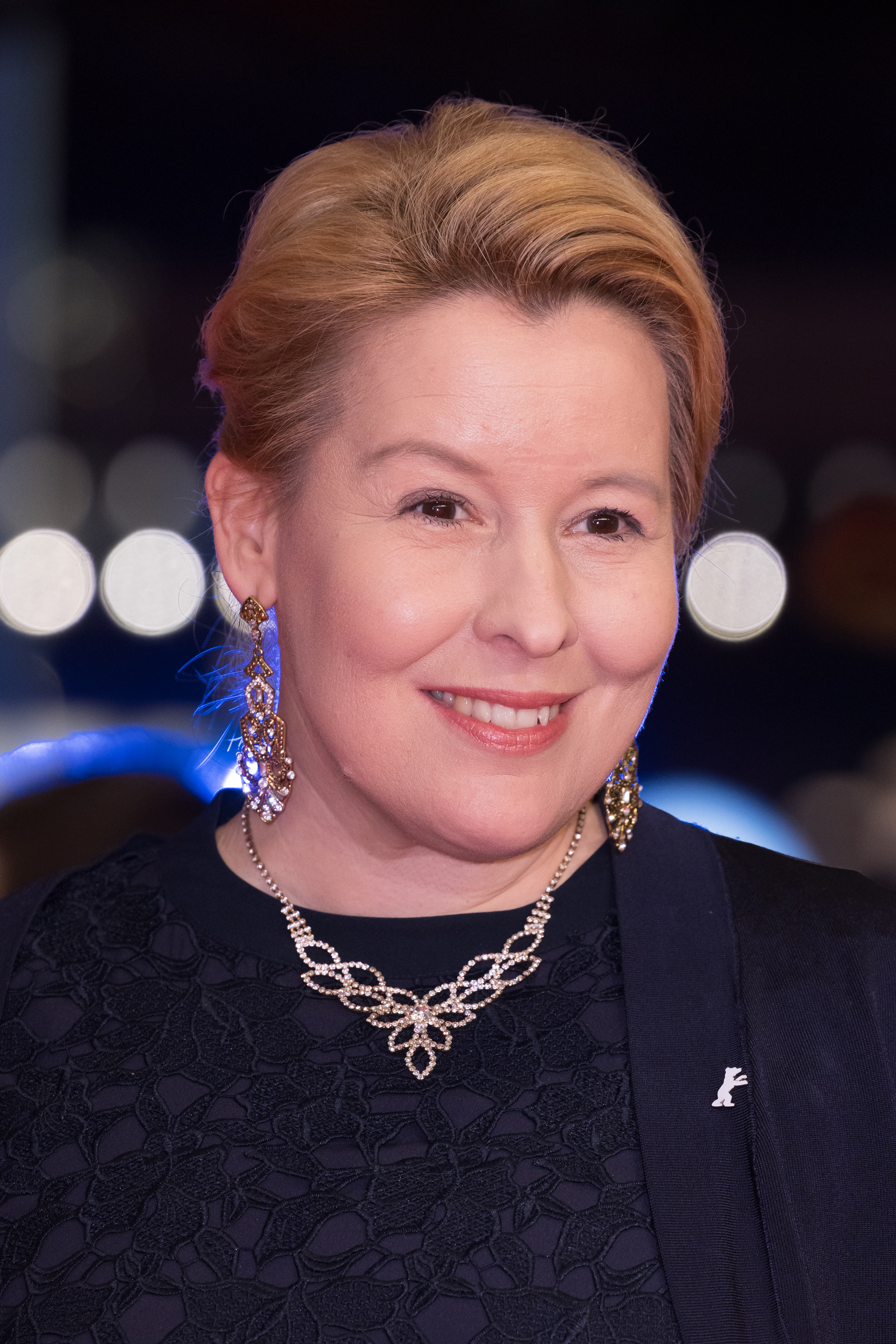
Franziska Giffey

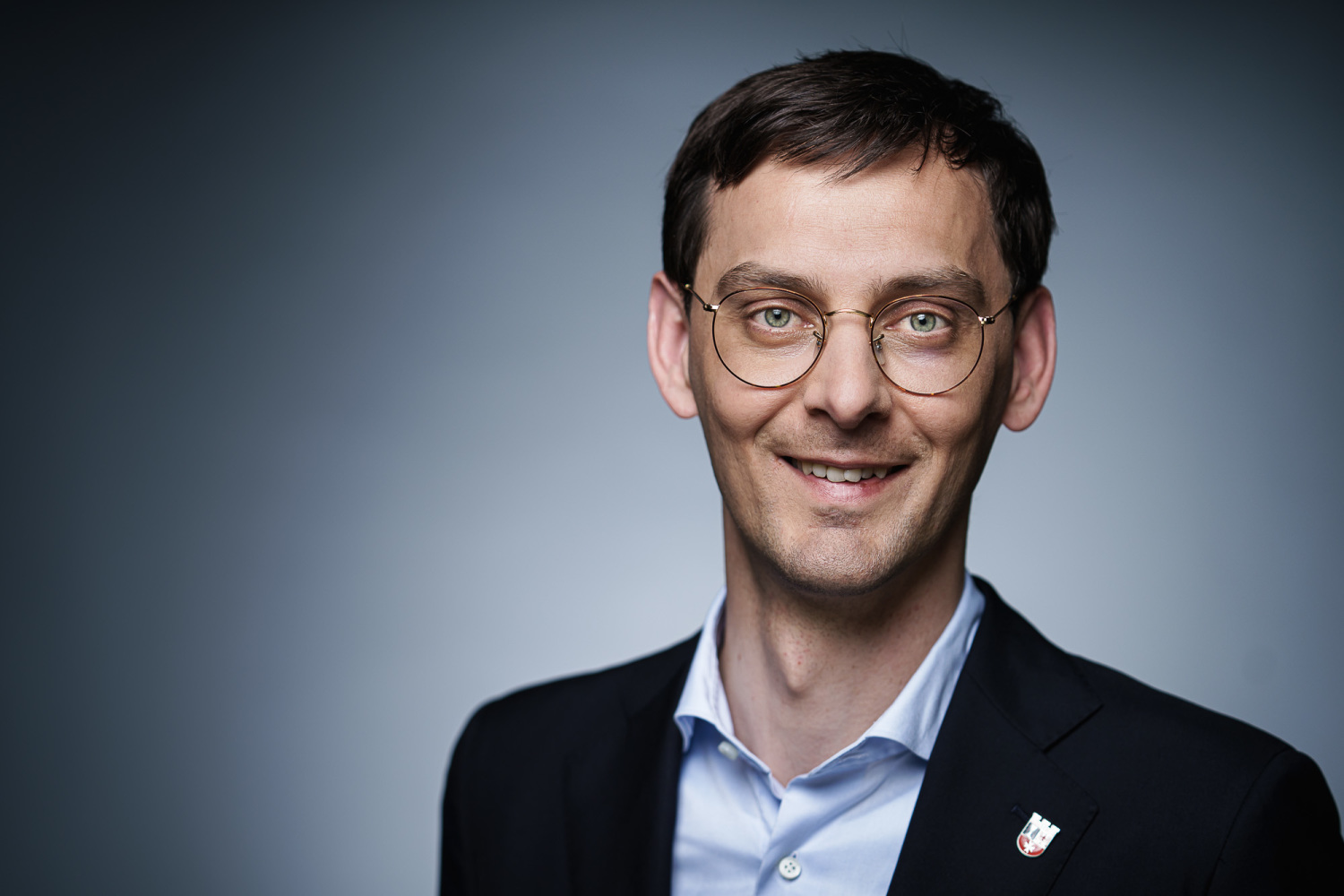
Martin Hikel

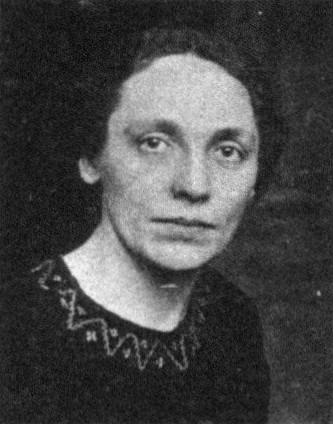
Marie Juchacz

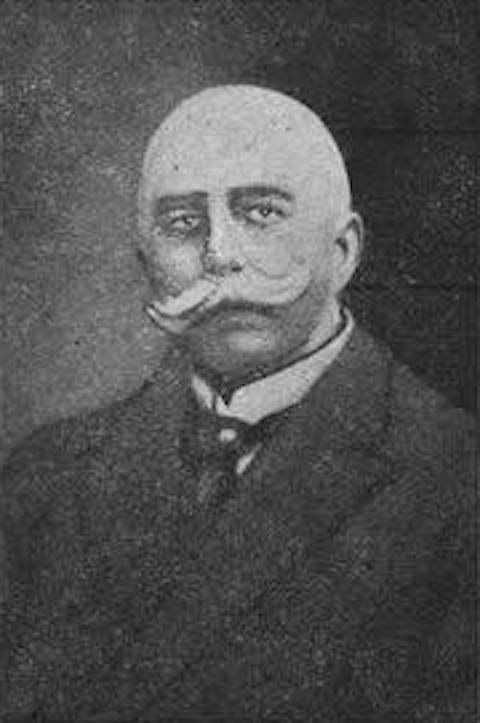
Curt Kaiser

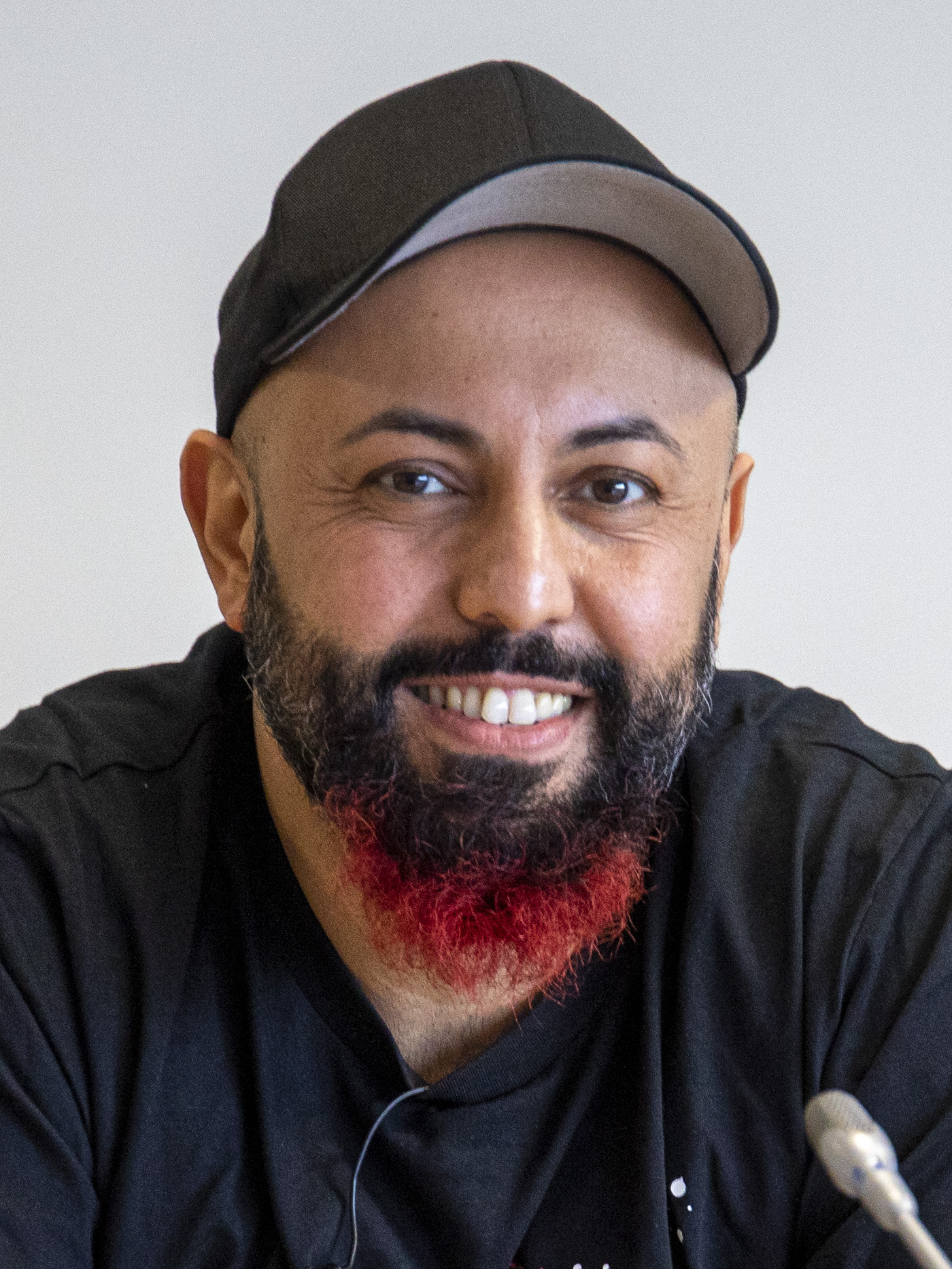
Ferat Koçak

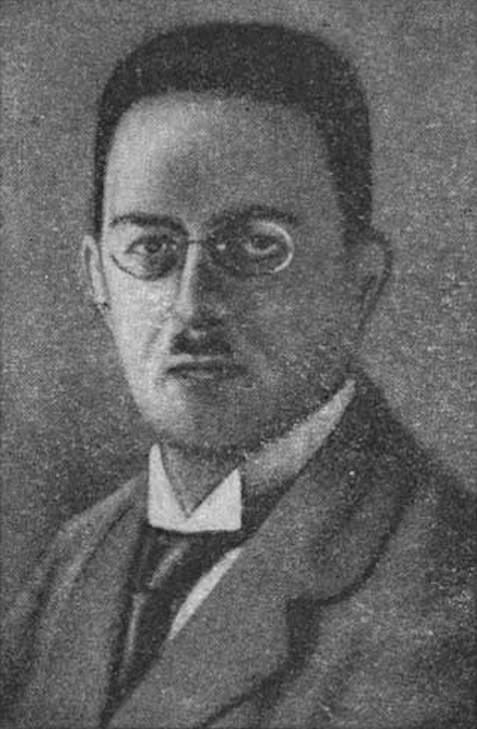
Alfred Scholz

Rixdorf became an independent city in 1899 and was incorporated as a borough of Berlin in the 1920 Greater Berlin Act, so the city of Rixdorf (later Neukölln) has only had three mayors and lord mayors respectively. (Note: The term Lord Mayor is only a rough translation of the German Oberbürgermeister, literally "Chief Mayor", but still applies, because the title was awarded by the German Emperor.) Both the Hermannstraße and the Boddinstraße, together with the corresponding plazas, were named after Rixdorf's first mayor, Hermann Boddin. (Note: According to many modern secondary sources, the Hermannstraße is supposedly named after Arminius, who was later mythologized in Germany as Hermann der Cherusker and became a prominent ideological figurehead in Prussian politics of the 19th century, but contemporary documentation by Rixdorf's administration from the time of the street's rechristening in 1875, now archived by Neukölln's district office, attests that the street's name is derived from Hermann Boddin, who had been instrumental in the street's development and expansion; even though this provenance was widely known among the populace, Boddin's family always denied it (Jürgen Meyer-Kronthaler, Wolfgang Kramer, Berlins S-Bahnhöfe – Ein dreiviertel Jahrhundert, Berlin 1998, p. 120; cf. Fabian Friedmann, "Der Patriarch", Neukoellner, 19 September 2012). According to 1885 local civil engineering records, the same eponymous provenance applies to the name Hermannplatz; cf. "Hermannplatz", in: Roman Kaupert (ed.), Kauperts Straßenführer durch Berlin, Zepter und Krone: Edition Luisenstadt, Berlin 2019. Furthermore, for Rixdorf's proposed rechristening, Boddin had insisted the city be renamed Hermannstadt after himself (see above), which underscores his egomaniacal side that his family tried to remedy after his death.) None of Rixdorf's and Neukölln's three city mayors were natives, while only Alfred Scholz' political party affiliation is known from historical sources. (Note: Boddin and Kaiser were likely conservatives and royalists, and therefore aligned with political parties like the Zentrum or the DkP.) As part of the borough Neukölln, the quarter of Neukölln has been administered by the borough mayor since 1920. As of 2025, the incumbent is Martin Hikel (SPD). (Note: For a list of all historical mayors and borough mayors, see: "Ehemalige Bürgermeister des Bezirkes", Bezirksamt Neukölln.)

Name	Title	City	Term	Party	Born	Died	Notes
Boddin, Karl Wilhelm Hermann	Mayor, First Mayor, Lord Mayor	Rixdorf	1899–1907	–	1844-05-16	1907-07-23	in office until his death (Note: Before Rixdorf was chartered, Boddin had already been the town's principal municipal magistrate (Amts- und Gemeindevorsteher) since 4 February 1874, following the unification of Deutsch- and Böhmisch-Rixdorf (see above); Boddin transitioned to the role of mayor on 1 April 1899, received the official title Erster Bürgermeister auf Lebenszeit (First Mayor for Life) from district president Robert Earl Hue de Grais on 4 May 1899, and was awarded the title Oberbürgermeister (Lord Mayor) by Wilhelm II on his 30-year office anniversary on 4 February 1904.)
Kaiser, Curt	Mayor, Lord Mayor	Rixdorf, Neukölln	1907–1919	–	1865-01-26	1940-04-25	often spelled Kurt Kaiser (Note: His nickname among the people was Kaiser von Rixdorf ("emperor of Rixdorf") as a pun on his surname; Kaiser became mayor under Lord Mayor (Oberbürgermeister) Boddin on 26 March 1907; a few months after Boddin's death (23 July 1907), he was awarded the title Lord Mayor by Wilhelm II on 3 December 1908 at the opening of Rixdorf's new City Hall; he remained in office through the city's renaming to Neukölln (1912) until the end of his term on 1 November 1919 during the November Revolution.)
Scholz, Alfred Heinrich Paul	Mayor	Neukölln	1919–1920	SPD	1876-05-15	1944-11-02	transitioned to Neukölln's first borough mayor (Note: Scholz was elected to the Rixdorf council of city representatives in 1906 and became its president (Stadtverordnetenvorsteher) in 1911, the first Social Democratic politician of Germany to serve in this capacity. He was elected Neukölln's mayor in April 1919, when mayoral contender and long-serving city councillor Hermann Sander (1899–1919) stepped away from his political duties after a reform of Neukölln's electoral law. Scholz first served as mayor under Lord Mayor Curt Kaiser until the end of Kaiser's term on 1 November 1919, then as Neukölln's sole mayor until 27 April 1920, when he transitioned to borough mayor after the Greater Berlin Act came into force. He remained Neukölln's borough mayor until 1 March 1933, including another three years as council president (1931–33), when he was forced to resign from his offices under pressure from the new ruling NSDAP (see also Law for the Restoration of the Professional Civil Service); his unlawfully appointed successor during the Nazi era (1933–45) was Kurt Samson. In 2014, the plaza Platz der Stadt Hof at Rixdorf's Karl-Marx-Straße was renamed Alfred-Scholz-Platz in his honor. Scholz' wife was Neukölln's only female revolutionary council member Gertrud Scholz.)

List of other notable local politicians of Rixdorf, Neukölln and Berlin-Neukölln
Name	Status	Born	Died	Notes
Manitius, Adolph Gebhard	resident	1682	1754-12-27	Rixdorf hofmeister, proprietor of the schultheiß fief court (1704–37)
Pflüger, Karl Friedrich Wilhelm	native	1784-12-12	1833-06-27	schultheiß of Deutsch-Rixdorf (1814–30)
Wanzlick, Daniel Friedrich	native	1819-02-15	1877-06-19	last Bohemian schultheiß of Böhmisch-Rixdorf (5 May 1869 – 11 June 1873)
Schinke, Johann Friedrich	native	1826-11-20	1875-08-03	last schultheiß of Deutsch-Rixdorf (27 January 1863 – 1 January 1874)
Maresch, Daniel	resident	1833-09-11	1923-12-23	alderman, municipal magistrate, city administrator
Barta, Carl Friedrich	resident	1833-12-10	1914-09-25	innkeeper, Böhmisch-Rixdorf's principal municipal magistrate (1871–73), municipal magistrate under Hermann Boddin (1874–88)
Jansa, Wilhelm	native	1834-12-20	1909-04-20	farmer, alderman, municipal magistrate (1878–99)
Mier, Friedrich Wilhelm	resident	1836-02-18	1912-12-19	Rixdorf/Neukölln city councilor
Schudoma, Johann	native	1840-02-19	1903-10-04	only Bohemian municipal magistrate of the unified Rixdorf authorities (1874–99), city councilor (1899–1903)
Sander, Hermann	resident	1845-07-14	1939-03-12	industrialist, Rixdorf municipal councilor (1887–96), municipal administrator (1896–98), Rixdorf/Neukölln city administrator and honorary council president (1899–1919)
Bürkner, August	native	1847-01-06	1914-12-27	Rixdorf municipal representative (1889–99), Rixdorf/Neukölln city councilor (1899–1914)
Thiemann, August	native	1849-09-10	1923-05-17	Rixdorf/Neukölln city magistrate and councilor (1899–1919)
Leyke, Gustav Adolf	resident	1851-09-10	1910-07-28	merchant, Rixdorf municipal administrator (1892–98), city councilor (1899–1910)
Niemetz, Daniel Benjamin	resident	1853-06-25	1910-05-09	gardener, Rixdorf municipal magistrate (1886–99), city councilor (1899–1909), city elder (1909)
Voigt, Georg Philipp Wilhelm	resident	1866-09-16	1927-04-13	Second Mayor of Rixdorf under Boddin (1899–1906), city councilor of Gdańsk, Lord Mayor of i.a. Frankfurt
Wutzky, Emil	resident	1871-10-04	1963-12-30	unionist, cooperativist, Rixdorf/Neukölln city councilor (1899–1917)
Schönborn, Richard	resident	1878-02-13	1957-03-03	merchant, borough representative (1924–25, Centre Party), member of the Reichstag (1925–30)
Juchacz, Marie	resident	1879-03-15	1956-01-26	housemaid, industry worker, social reformer, women's rights activist, executive and women's representative (1908–13, Rixdorf SPD), secretary for women's affairs in Cologne (1913–17), official at the Center for Home Working and the Food Commission, Berlin secretary for women's affairs (1917–19), Member of the Reichstag (1920–33), first female representative to address a German parliament, founder of the Arbeiterwohlfahrt; born Marie Gohlke
Scholz, Hedwig Emma Gertrud	resident	1881-04-26	1950-04-18	patternmaker, executive and women's representative (Rixdorf SPD), only female member of Neukölln's Workers' and Soldiers' Council (1918/19), Neukölln city and borough representative (1919–21), Berlin city representative (1921–33), Reinickendorf borough representative (1946–50); wife of Neukölln's third mayor and first borough mayor Alfred Scholz; later Hedwig Emma Gertrud Hass; born Hedwig Emma Gertrud Uster
Schlecht, Paul	native	1882-09-28	1947-04-29	toolmaker, member of the Revolutionary Stewards, Communist functionary (KPD), district administrator, member of the Reichstag (1924–28), party leader
Löwenstein, Kurt	resident	1885-05-18	1939-05-08	socialist reform pedagogue, borough councilor (1921–33)
Raddatz, Erich	resident	1886-11-28	1964-02-16	locksmith, borough representative (1926–30)
Fechner, Max	native	1892-07-27	1973-09-13	toolmaker, borough representative (1921–25)
Ohm, Martin	native	1895	1955	borough officer, administrative auditor, first post-war borough mayor of Neukölln (April–October 1945), appointed by the Soviet Army; instrumental in Neukölln's immediate post-war recovery
Fink, Hans	associated	1898-12-18	1945-08-01	bank clerk, NSDAP Kreisleiter (district chairman) for Neukölln, member of the Reichstag (1936–38)
Fischer, Hermann Richard Gustav	native	1900-02-24	1983-02-28	manager, administrator, Neukölln borough representative (1929–33, DVP), Berlin city and state representative (1948–58, FDP), Tempelhof borough mayor (1951–53), Berlin Senator of the Interior (1953–54), Mayor of Berlin (1954)
Samson, Kurt	resident	1900-05-08	1947-03-09	jurist, Neukölln borough mayor (NSDAP, 1933–45)
Exner, Kurt	native	1901-05-15	1996-11-12	unionist, borough mayor (1949–59, Berlin SPD), Berlin senator for Labor and Social Welfare under Willy Brandt (1959–67)
Kling, Wilhelm "Willi"	resident	1902-02-07	1973-11-17	merchant, journalist, Neukölln sub-district chairman (KPD), post-war Neukölln KPD secretary, SED central committee official; partner of Gertrud Rosenmeyer; a.k.a. Fritz (Communist underground pseudonym)
Wollenberg, Karl	associated	1903-04-30	1958-04-25	fireman, storekeeper, German Labour Front executive, NSDAP Kreisleiter (district chairman) for Neukölln, member of the Reichstag (1938–45), judge for economic law
Buwitt, Dankward	native	1939-07-06		merchant, Neukölln district chairman (CDU), Berlin state representative (1975–91), member of the German Bundestag (MdB, 1990–2002)
Hackel, Wolfgang	resident	1942-11-27		political scientist, CDU Neukölln executive member, borough councilor, MdB (1980–85), member of the European Parliament (1985–89)
Bielka, Frank	native	1947-10-22		business economist, borough mayor (1989–91), Degewo board chairman (until 2002)
Buschkowsky, Heinz	native	1948-07-31		public manager, author, borough mayor (1991/92, 2001–15)
Giffey, Franziska	resident	1978-05-03		public manager, borough mayor (2015–18, SPD), governing mayor of Berlin (2021–23)
Koçak, Ferat Ali	resident	1979-05-26		economist, manager, marketing director, Berlin state representative (Die Linke), MdB (since 2025); first politician of Die Linke to win a direct mandate in a formerly West German electoral district
Audretsch, Andreas	resident	1984-06-25		journalist, author, Neukölln Alliance 90/The Greens board member and speaker, MdB (since 2021), vice chairman of the parliamentary group
Demir, Hakan	resident	1984-11-16		political scientist, Migazin co-editor-in-chief, chairman of Rixdorf's local SPD office, SPD Berlin board member, MdB (since 2021), member of the Parliamentary Left
Hikel, Martin	resident	1986-04-30		teacher, borough mayor (2018–26), Berlin SPD chairman (2024–25)
Helm, Anne	resident	1986-06-07		actor, borough representative (Pirate Party), Berlin state representative (Die Linke), chairwoman of the parliamentary group (since 2022)
Hopp, Marcel	native	1988-02		teacher, author, influencer, Neukölln Juso chairman, borough deputy, SPD Neukölln co-chairman, Berlin state representative (SPD, since 2021)

== Local building officials ==
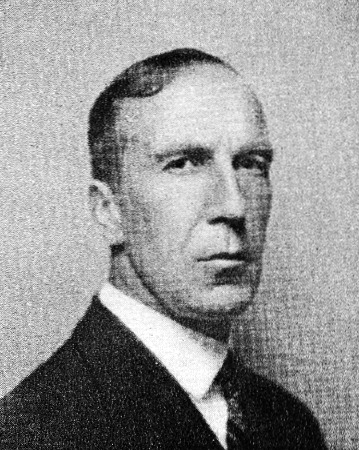
Karl Bonatz

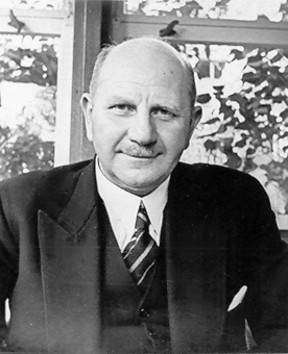
Franz Hoffmann

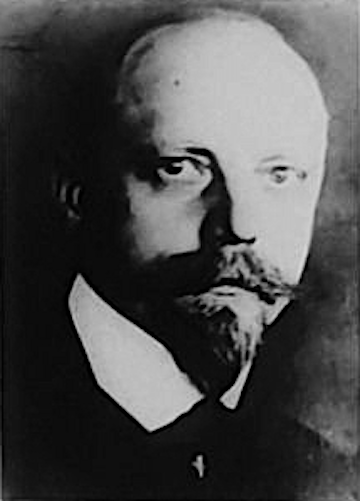
Reinhold Kiehl

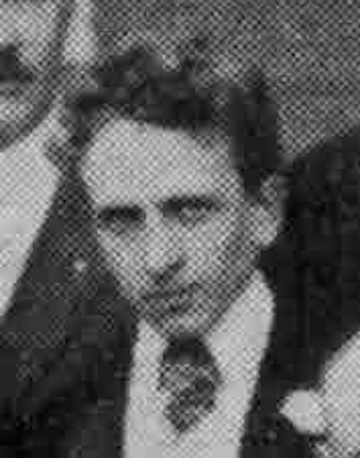
John Martens

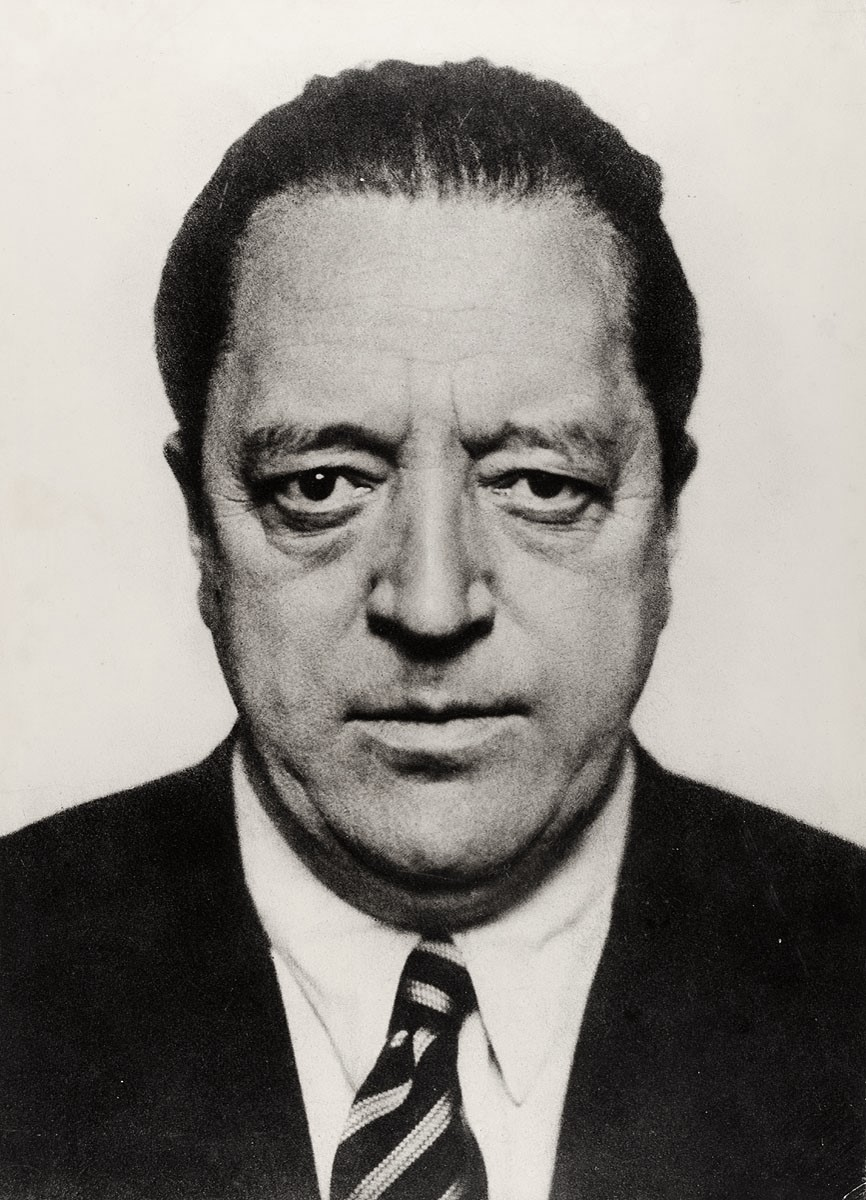
Ludwig Mies van der Rohe

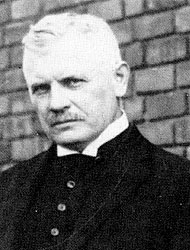
Hans Heinrich Müller

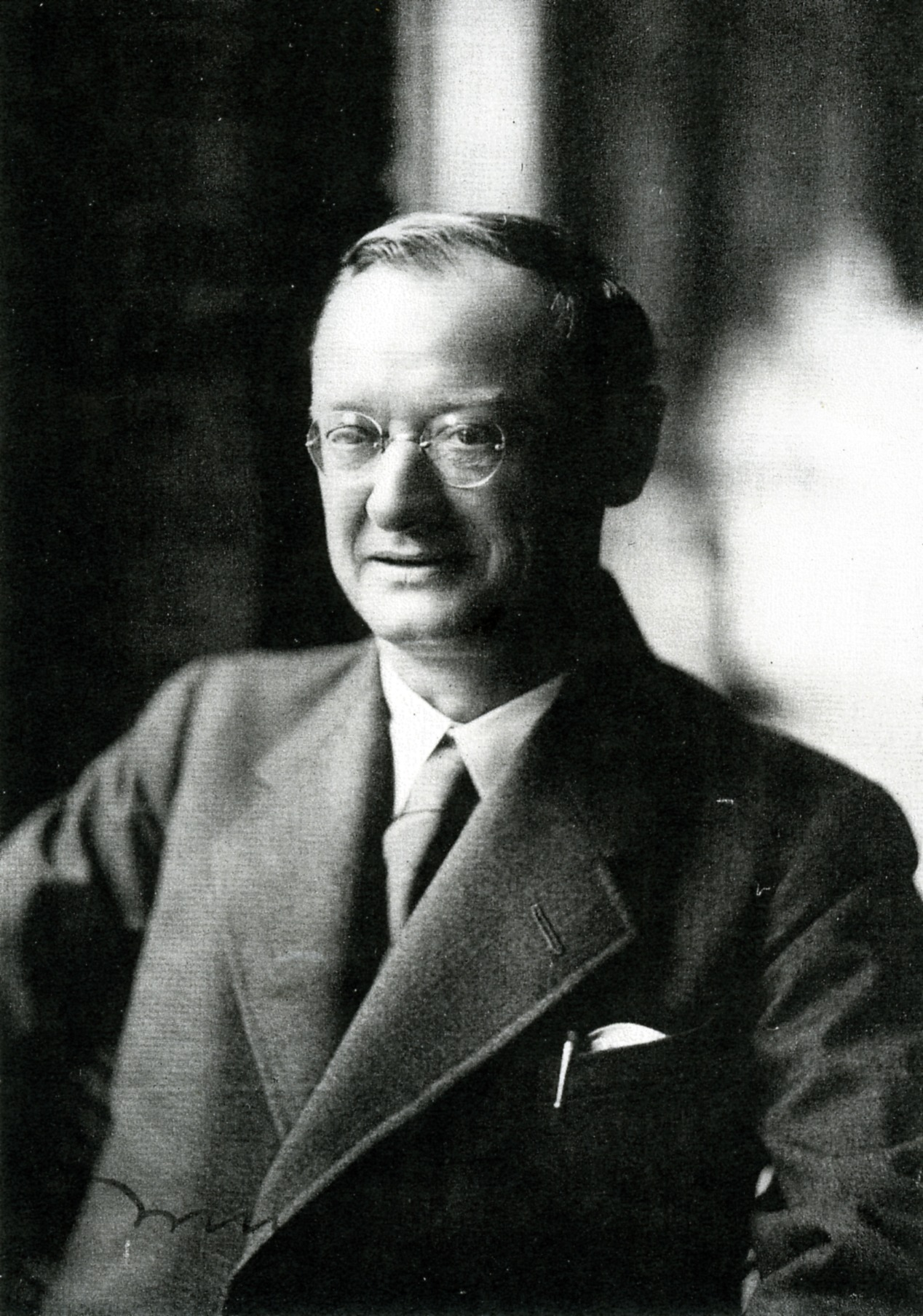
Bruno Taut

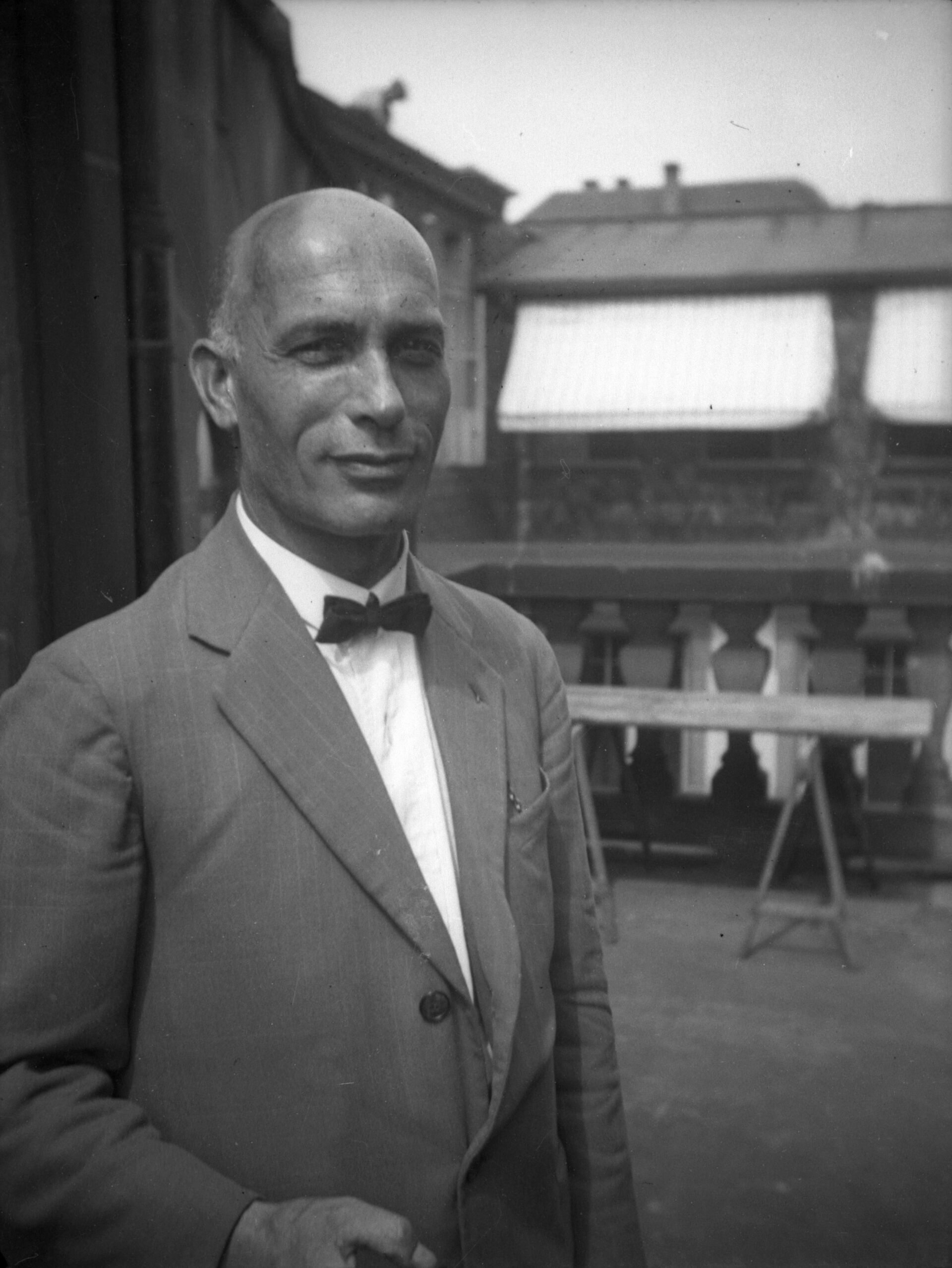
Josef Zizler

During the tenure of Reinhold Kiehl and his colleagues, for example fellow architect Heinrich Best (1876–1916), Rixdorf's Hochbauamt (office of public works service) and building authority received a stellar reputation across the German Empire, which attracted many young architects, who all earned their stripes in Rixdorf and Neukölln before becoming often renowned independent architects, for example Ludwig Mies van der Rohe, Franz Hoffmann and Bruno Taut.

List of notable building officials and local architects of Rixdorf, Neukölln and Berlin-Neukölln
Name	Born	Died	Notes
Weigand, Hermann	1854-02-02	1926-10-16	Rixdorf/Neukölln building officer (1904–21), Neukölln city elder (1924)
Kiehl, Reinhold	1874-04-22	1913-03-10	director of Rixdorf's Hochbauamt (1905–12)
Martens, John	1875-05-04	1936-06-04	director of the Hochbauamt's design office (until 1908); born Henning John Gustav Martens
Müller, Hans Heinrich	1879-04-20	1951-12-07	building official (1920–24)
Zollinger, Friedrich Reinhard Balthasar	1880-03-31	1945-04-19	building official (1912–18)
Taut, Bruno	1880-05-04	1938-12-24	building official (1908–09)
Goetze, Robert Friedrich	1881	1940^{[tpq]}	assistant director of the design office (1906–24)
Zizler, Josef	1881-03-19	1955-10-24	building official (1917–21)
Bonatz, Karl Nikolaus	1882-07-06	1951-09-24	construction administrator (1927–40)
Taut, Max	1884-05-15	1967-02-26	building official (until 1912)
Hoffmann, Franz	1884-06-13	1951-07-15	building official (1908–09)
Borgwardt, Johannes Karl Stephan	1885-09-28	1943-10-04	design official (1907–24), design office assistant director (1924–42)
Mies van der Rohe, Ludwig	1886-03-27	1969-08-17	building official (1904–05); born Maria Ludwig Michael Mies

== Other notable people ==
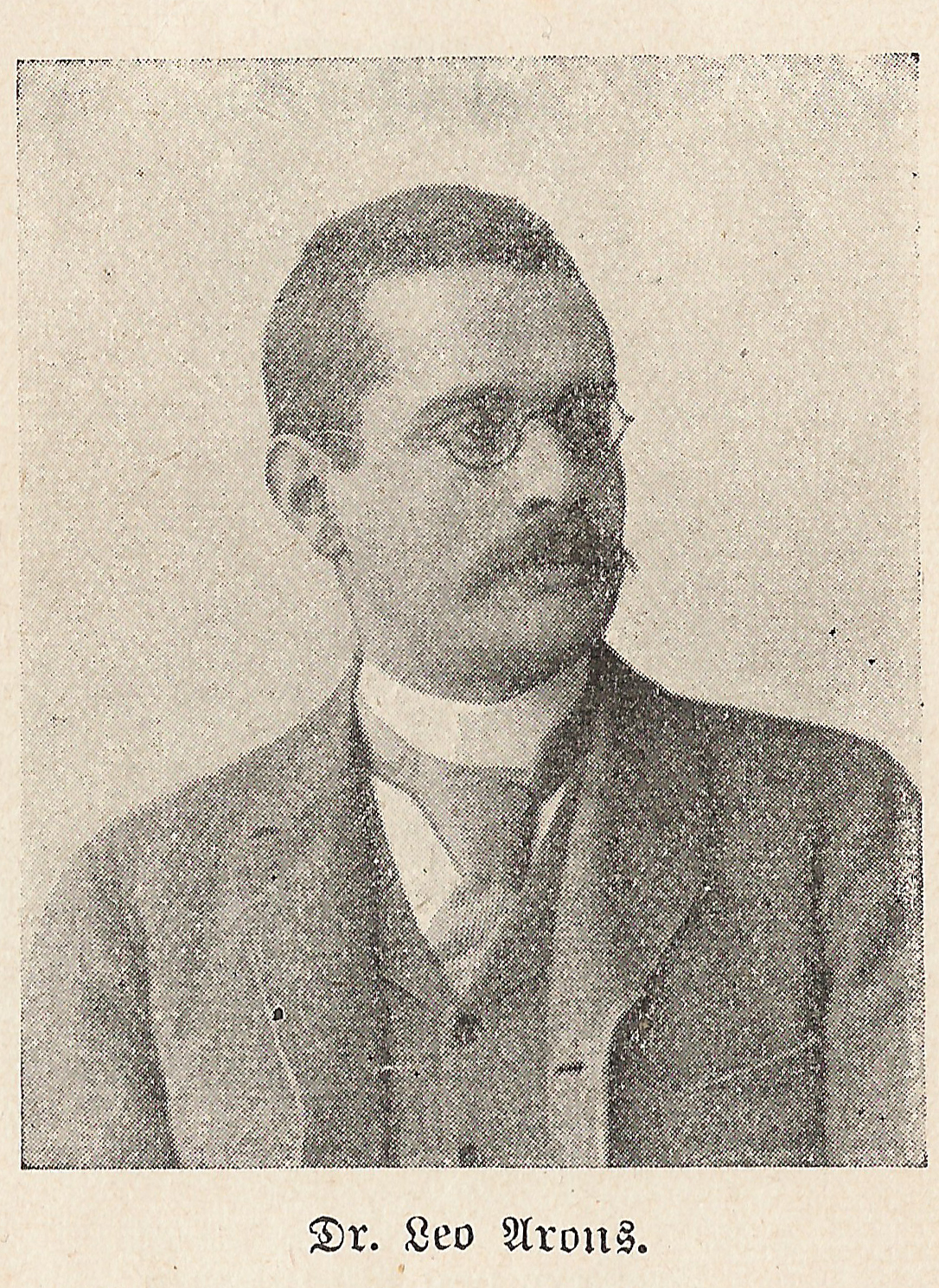
Leo Arons around 1901

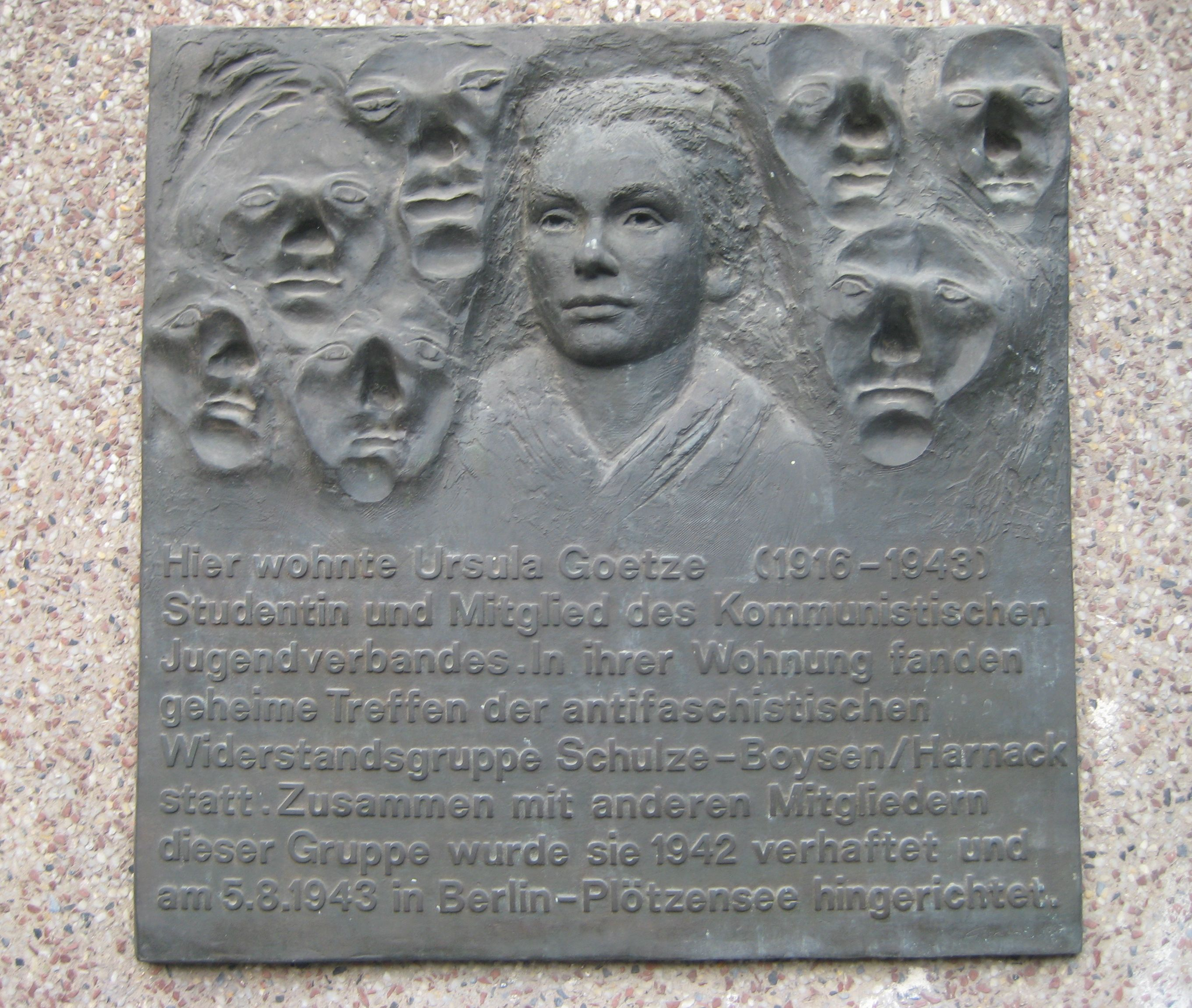
Memorial plate Ursula Goetze (1987)

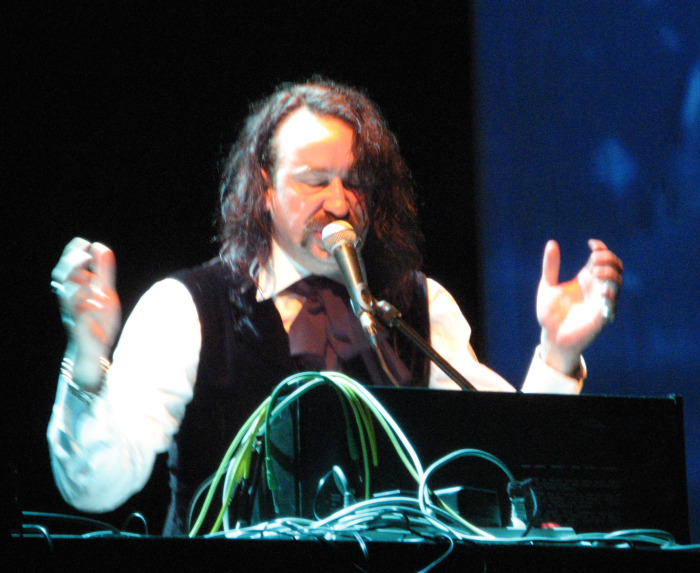
Alexander Hacke performing on 5 May 2007

- Robin Alexander (born 1975), journalist
- Edgar Froese (1944–2015), musician, founder of the electronic music group Tangerine Dream
- Leo Arons (1860–1919), physicist, social democrat and supporter of the trade union movement
- Sebastian Blomberg (born 1972), actor
- Horst Buchholz (1933–2003), actor
- Heinz Buschkowsky (born 1948), politician (SPD), former district mayor of Neukölln
- Bushido (born 1978), rapper
- Christiane F. (born 1962), subject of the book Zoo Station: The Story of Christiane F.
- Ursula Goetze, anti-Nazi activist (1916–1943)
- Alexander Hacke, musician, born 1965 in Neukölln
- Kirsten Heisig (1961–2010), juvenile magistrate in Neukölln, created the Neuköllner Modell, applying rapid intervention procedures to deal with juvenile offenders before they embarked on a criminal lifestyle
- Kurt Krömer (born 1974), presenter, actor and entertainer
- Jutta Limbach (1934–2016), legal academic
- Will Meisel (1897–1967), composer and publisher
- Inge Meysel (1910–2004), actress
- Gunnar Möller (1928–2017), actor
- Mady Rahl (1915–2009), actress
- Palina Rojinski (born 1985), actress
- Antonio Rüdiger (born 1993), footballer
- Werner Seelenbinder (1904–1944), wrestler, politician (KPD) and resistance fighter
- Katharina Szelinski-Singer (1918–2010), sculptor
- Elsa Thiemann (1910–1981), Bauhaus educated photographer, who took many photographs of Neukölln where she lived
- Nora Tschirner (born 1981), actress
- Lotte Ulbricht (1903–2002), wife of East German leader Walter Ulbricht
- Emil Wutzky (1871–1963), trade unionist and local politician (SPD)
- Engelbert Zaschka (1895–1955), inventor and helicopter pioneer
- Alice Phoebe Lou (born 1993), a South African singer-songwriter
