= Georg Zivier =

German writer, theatre critic and journalist

Georg Zivier (13 February 1897 – 19 March 1974) was a German writer, theatre critic and journalist.

== Life ==
Born in Wrocław, Zivier was the son of the historian and writer Ezechiel Zivier. After studying in Greifswald and Berlin, he worked as a writer and journalist. In 1937, Zivier was expelled from the Reichsschrifttumskammer because of his Jewish origin and later obliged to do forced labour. He nevertheless continued to write under the pseudonym "Hans Gregor" for both the Vossische Zeitung and the Berliner Tageblatt.

In 1946, Arno Scholz engaged him as head of the department "cultural politics" for the Berlin Telegraf. Until 1955, he also worked for Die Neue Zeitung as a theatre critic. Neben seiner journalistischen Arbeit schrieb er Erzählungen und Hörspiele. Für sein Theaterstück „Perlicke, perlacke“ erhielt er 1963 den Brüder-Grimm-Preis des Landes Berlin.

Zivier died in Berlin at the age of 77.

== Work ==
- Harmonie und Ekstase: Mary Wigman (1956)
- Komödianten und fahrende Poeten (1956)
- Ernst Deutsch und das Deutsche Theater (1964)
- Das Romanische Café. Erscheinungen und Randerscheinungen rund um die Gedächtniskirche (1965)
- Berlin und der Tanz (1968)
- Deutschland und seine Juden (1971)
