= Heinz Kapelle =

Leader of the Young Communist League of Germany (1913–1941)

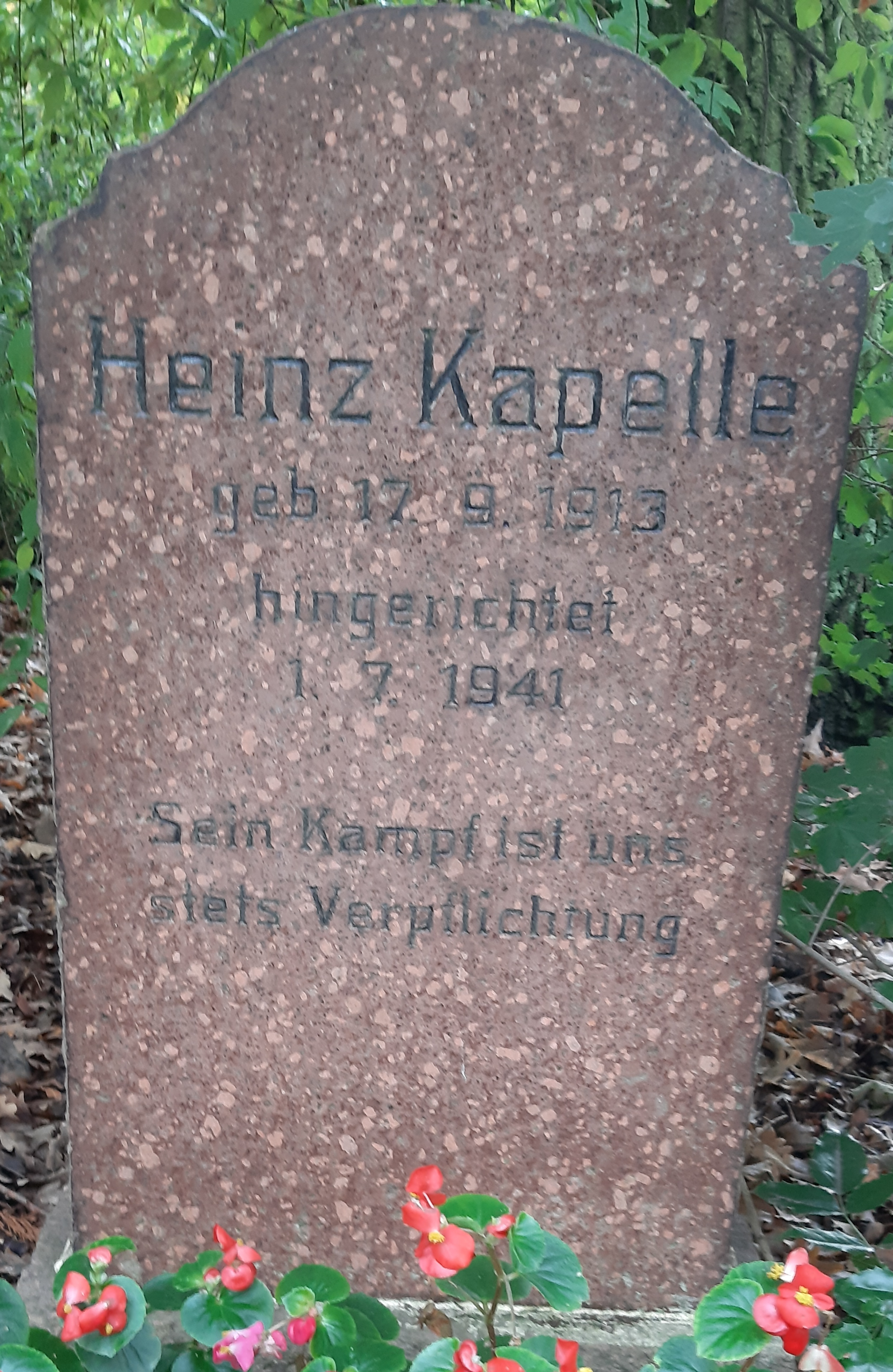
Grave of Heinz Kapelle in Berlin-Tempelhof, with epigraph His struggle is always our obligation

Heinz Kapelle (17 September 1913 in Berlin – 1 July 1941 in Berlin) was a leader of the Young Communist League of Germany (Kommunistischer Jugendverband Deutschlands; KJVD) in Berlin in the 1930s.

By training he was a book printer, having learnt the craft between 1928 and 1932, but he was thereafter jobless until 1934. During his training, he had joined the KJVD in 1931, which became illegal with the Nazis' seizure of power in 1933. Nevertheless, he continued to be a member and used the Alliance to further his anti-fascist goals. He was, for instance, involved in the publication and distribution of anti-fascist literature.

Early in 1934, Kapelle was arrested for the first time and sentenced to two years' imprisonment on 20 September 1934 by the Berliner Kammergericht for "conspiracy to commit high treason". Once released, he quickly returned to anti-régime activities. He in effect led an illegal youth resistance group of about 60 members against the Nazis. The leaflets that he wrote he sometimes even distributed himself, by scattering them in the streets of Berlin's working-class neighbourhoods at night from his motorcycle.

He was arrested many times, but in the end, he and five other group members were arrested by the Gestapo on 16 October 1939. Kapelle was tortured, but never betrayed the other members of his group. The Volksgerichtshof sentenced Heinz Kapelle to death on 21 February 1941 for "furthering the enemy's cause and conspiracy to commit high treason". On 1 July of that year, he was put to death at Plötzensee Prison in Berlin. He is honoured today as a hero by the Communist Youth Movement. A street in the Berlin neighbourhood Prenzlauer Berg is named Heinz-Kapelle-Straße in his honour. Also there is a street close to German Parliament in the very center of Berlin honouring him named Kapelle-Ufer (which loosely translates to "Kapelle Bank" or "Kapelle Shore").

== Sources ==
- Biography at German Resistance Memorial Center (includes portrait photo)
