= Emil Wutzky =

German politician (1871–1963)

Emil Wutzky (4 October 1871 in Berlin – 30 December 1963 in West Berlin) was a German unionist, cooperativist and social-democratic politician. He was initially active in the Neukölln district and eventually became a city councilor of Berlin.

There is a station in the Berlin U-Bahn named after him.
