= Arno Scholz =

German journalist, publicist and publisher

- Born: Arno Helmut Erwin Scholz; 22 February 1904; Rixdorf, Germany
- Died: 30 July 1971 (aged 67); Berlin
- Occupations: Journalist; Publicist; Publisher
- Known for: Publishing Telegraf
- Political party: Social Democratic Party of Germany (SPD)
- Parents: Alfred Scholz (father); Gertrud Scholz (mother)

Arno Helmut Erwin Scholz (22 February 1904 – 30 July 1971) was a German journalist, commentator and publisher. The daily newspaper Telegraf, which he published, was one of the most influential newspapers in Berlin's post-war years.

== Life ==
Arno Scholz was born the son of German politicians Alfred Scholz (1876–1944) and Gertrud Scholz (1881–1950) on 22 February 1904 in Rixdorf (now Neukölln), Germany. His older sister was Hertha Beese (1902–1987) who was appointed to the Stadtältester von Berlin in 1972.

During his apprenticeship as a publishing clerk, he joined the Social Democratic Party of Germany (SPD) in 1922. After the seizure of power by the Nazis in 1933, he was politically persecuted and banned from his profession.

In December 1948, Scholz was elected to the Berliner Stadtverordnetenversammlung, of which he belonged until 1950.

Telegraf was one of the most important newspapers in West Berlin in the 1950s and 1960s. Scholz also established the nacht-depesche as the morning paper, in which he appointed Werner Nieke as editor-in-chief. In the heyday of Telegraf and nacht-depesche, outstanding post-war journalists worked in Scholz's publishing house on Bismarckplatz in Berlin-Grunewald – among them the editor and later editor-in-chief Eberhard Grashoff, Rudolf Brendemühl and Hans Hermann Theobald, who jointly headed the local editorial office, the correspondent at Economic Councilor of the Bizone Hilde Purwin, the head of the cultural policy department Georg Zivier, the head of the weekly supplement Frauen-Telegraf Susanne Suhr, the head of the feature pages Dora Fehling, and the reporter Alexander Kulpok.
