= Wilhelm Kling =

Communist Party of Germany (KPD) functionary (1902–1973)

Wilhelm Kling (7 February 1902 – 17 November 1973) was a Communist Party of Germany (KPD) functionary, and later an associate in the Politburo of the Central Committee of the Socialist Unity Party of Germany (SED) in East Germany.

Kling was born in Bammental in the Grand Duchy of Baden. He completed his training as a salesman in 1916-1921, and was an employee in Dortmund until 1924. He worked for various building companies until 1928, was unemployed until 1929, and was the editor of the newspaper Berlin am Morgen between 1929 and 1933.

From 1922 to 1924, Kling was a member of the Association for Defence against Anti-Semitism in Germany (Verein zur Abwehr des Antisemitismus in Deutschland). As of 1923, he was active in various capacities for the KPD in the subdistrict (Unterbezirk) of Dortmund, and later in the subdistrict of Berlin.

From March 1933, after Adolf Hitler and the Nazis had taken power, he was unlawfully engaged in the KPD's information service, which led to his arrest in July 1935. In October 1936, he was sentenced to six years in labour prison (Zuchthaus) in the Volksgerichtshof's last public proceedings. Until 1945, he was imprisoned in, among other places, Plötzensee Prison in Berlin, Brandenburg-Görden and Bayreuth, as well as in Aschendorfer Moor, Sachsenhausen and Mauthausen concentration camps.

In 1945-1946, he joined the KPD-SED in Berlin and was a colleague in the SED Central Committee. As leader of the subdivision known as "Functionaries in State and Commerce", he was instrumental in the expropriation of business and war crimes enterprises. Between 1953 and 1961, he was the acting director of the German Economic Institute (Deutsches Wirtschaftsinstitut), and after that, until 1969, an associate of the Agitation Commission at the SED Central Committee's Politburo.

Kling received the Patriotic Order of Merit in 1965, and the Order of Karl Marx in 1967, both East German honours. He died in Berlin.

== Works ==
- "Kleine Geschichte der IG Farben, der Großfabrikanten des Todes", Berlin 1957
