= Robin Alexander (journalist) =

German journalist and author (born 1975)

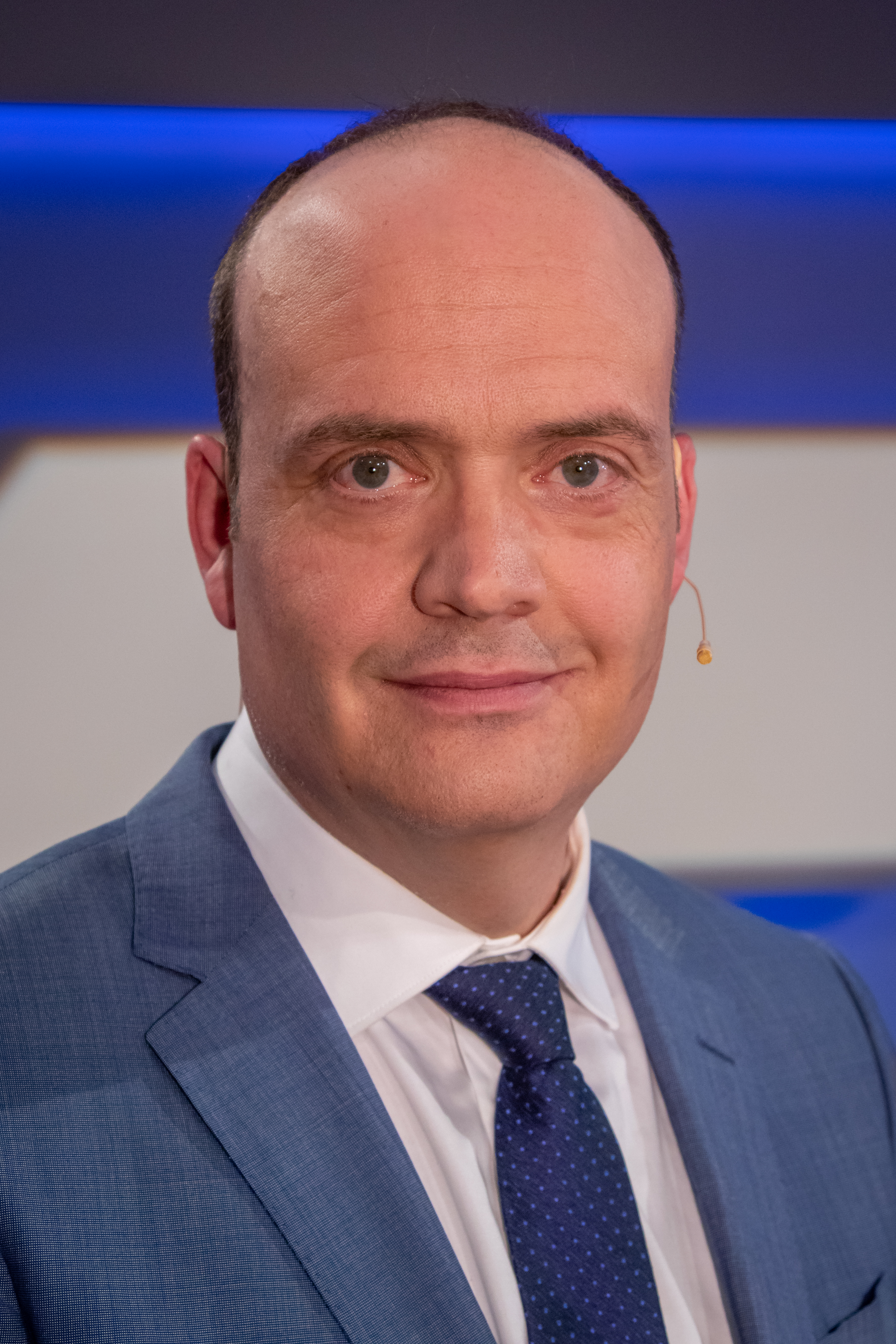
- Alexander in 2020
- Born: 13 May 1975 (age 51); Essen, Germany

Robin Alexander (born 13 May 1975) is a German journalist and author. He reports mainly for the Die Welt group on the German Chancellery and the CDU/CSU parties.

He co-hosts the successful domestic politics podcast Machtwechsel together with Dagmar Rosenfeld since 2021.

== Life ==
Robin Alexander was born in Essen, North Rhine-Westphalia. He studied history and journalism at the Leipzig University. From 1998 to 1999 he completed an internship at the Tageszeitung in Berlin, where he worked as a reporter and editor from 2001 to 2006. He was a columnist for the English-language city magazine Exberliner, made reportage trips through southern Africa and was a guest editor at The Star in Johannesburg in 2004. After one year of parental leave, he became founding editor of the German Vanity Fair in 2006.

Since 2008, Alexander has been writing for Die Welt und Welt am Sonntag, reporting on the German Chancellery since 2010 and accompanying Angela Merkel as rapporteur on international trips and summits. In 2013, he was a face of the Die Welt brand campaign. Alexander left the paper in 2025.

Robin Alexander is married, has three children and lives in Berlin.

== Publications ==
- Familie für Einsteiger. Ein Überlebenshandbuch. Rowohlt Berlin, Berlin 2007, ISBN 978-3-87134-571-5.
- Wenn Eltern laufen lernen. Eine Kurzanleitung. Rowohlt-Taschenbuch-Verlag, Reinbek 2009, ISBN 978-3-499-62241-0.
- Staatshilfe für Eltern Beltz Juventa, März 2013, ISBN 3-7799-2752-7, ISBN 978-3-7799-2752-5
- Die Getriebenen: Merkel und die Flüchtlingspolitik. Report aus dem Innern der Macht. Siedler, München 2017, ISBN 978-3-8275-0093-9.
- Machtverfall: Merkels Ende und das Drama der deutschen Politik: Ein Report. Siedler Verlag, München 2021, ISBN 978-3-827-50141-7.
- Letzte Chance: Der neue Kanzler und der Kampf um die Demokratie. Siedler, Berlin 2025, ISBN 978-3-8275-0200-1.
