= Heinz Buschkowsky =

German politician (born 1948)

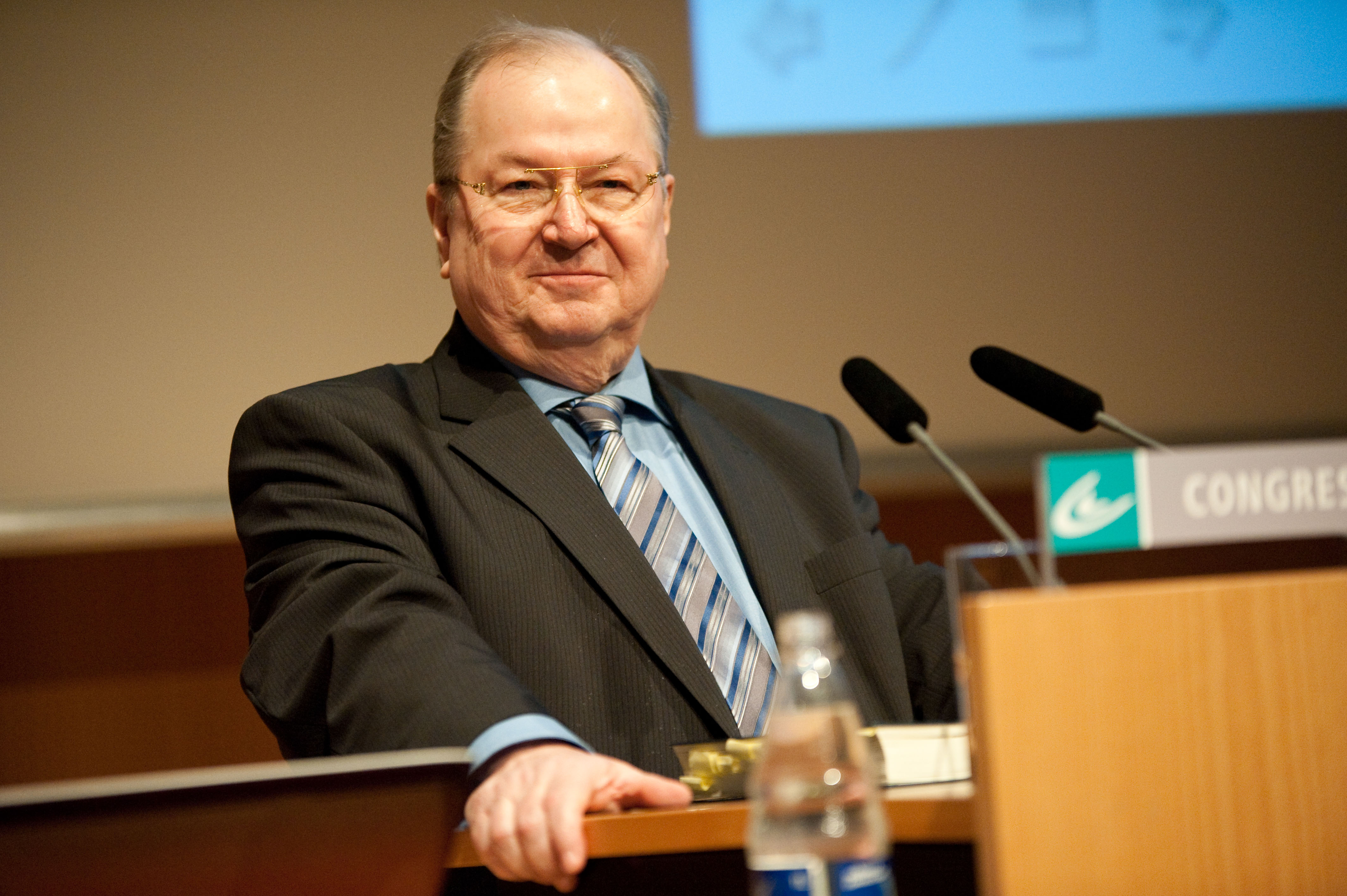
Buschkowsky in 2013

Heinz Buschkowsky (born 31 July 1948) is a German Social Democratic Party of Germany (SPD) politician and former Mayor of the Neukölln borough of Berlin.

Born in Berlin in the aftermath of the Second World War, Buschkowsky is the son of a locksmith and a secretary originally from Silesia. The family lived in a one-room basement apartment in Berlin-Rudow and later moved to Gropiusstadt.

After graduating, the young Buschkowsky entered the civil service and from 1973 worked in several Senate bodies. Then, in 1979, representing the SPD, he was elected to the Neukölln borough council. In 1985 he became leader of the SPD political group of the council, in which he belonged to the "Britzer circle", an influential faction on the right of the Berlin SPD. In 1991 and 1992 he was district mayor, from 1992 to 1999 deputy mayor and district councillor responsible for Finance, Personnel, and Sports, later for Youth and Sports, and from 1999 to 2001 he was also responsible for Health and Environment. On 1 December 2001, he became District Mayor of Berlin-Neukölln and Head of Finance, Economics, and Sport.

In 2004, Buschkowsky became a national figure with his thesis "Multiculturalism has Failed", written as mayor of a Berlin district with a high immigrant population. He placed a strong emphasis on commitment to good education of the children and young people of non-German origins, supported by kindergartens and all-day schools, an approach which he proposed should be adopted nationally.

In 2008, Buschkowsky defined himself as a follower of Helmut Schmidt, who had brought him into the SPD. He went on to become a member of the Federal Council of the SPD. On 30 September 2010, the Neukölln SPD unanimously chose Buschkowsky as its lead candidate for the 2011 city election, in which he was confirmed as district mayor.

He is an outspoken proponent of government support for integration of the immigrant population. His 2012 book Neukölln ist überall, describing the integration problems in Neukölln became a bestseller in Germany.
