= Kirsten Heisig =

German juvenile magistrate

Kirsten Heisig (August 24, 1961, Krefeld – June 28, 2010, Berlin) was a German juvenile magistrate. Heisig was criticized by parts of the political left and parts of the Arabic community for her statements and for her view that some foreign cultures neglect education and encourage juvenile delinquency. As a juvenile magistrate for Neukölln, an area with a crime rate 40% above the average of Berlin, she initiated the Neukölln model (Neuköllner Modell) that streamlined procedures and targeted an appearance before court within 3–5 weeks after the deed had been committed for deeds punishable by a maximum imprisonment of 4 weeks. Other key elements were encounters between delinquent and victim and community service and a cooperation between legal organs and social workers. This model was extended to the entire city of Berlin in June 2010 and caught attention on a national level.

She was found dead in the forest near Heiligensee on 3 July 2010; after a search of five days. The public prosecutor at first imposed a total news embargo but then quickly announced that Heisig had committed suicide.

The alleged suicide happened shortly after her submission of the manuscript of her book: Das Ende der Geduld: Konsequent gegen jugendliche Gewalttäter. (trans. When Patience Comes to an End: Consistent Actions Against Juvenile Offenders). Blurb from the dust jacket: "Wenn wir nicht rasch und konsequent handeln, wenn wir unsere Rechts- und Werteordnung nicht entschlossen durchsetzen, werden wir den Kampf gegen die Jugendgewalt verlieren." (trans. "If we do not react swiftly and decisively, if we do not preserve our legal structures and values, we will lose our struggle against juvenile violence."). It became a best-seller in Germany for several weeks.

== In popular media ==
- The 2014 TV movie The Limits of Patience is based on her life and book.

== Publications ==
- Praktischer Einblick in die Berliner Jugendgewaltkriminalität. Lösungsansätze auf dem Boden bereits geltenden Rechts am Beispiel des Risikobezirks Neukölln-Nord. In: Bund Deutscher Kriminalbeamter (Hrsg.): Der Kriminalist, Fachzeitschrift des BDK 40. Berlin 2008, 9, pp. 340–344, ISSN 0722-3501.
- Das Ende der Geduld: Konsequent gegen jugendliche Gewalttäter. Herder, Freiburg im Breisgau (July) 2010. ISBN 978-3-451-30204-6.

== See also ==
- Broken windows theory
