= Hermannstraße (Berlin-Neukölln) =

Street in Berlin

Coordinates: 52°28′27.56″N 13°25′39.56″E

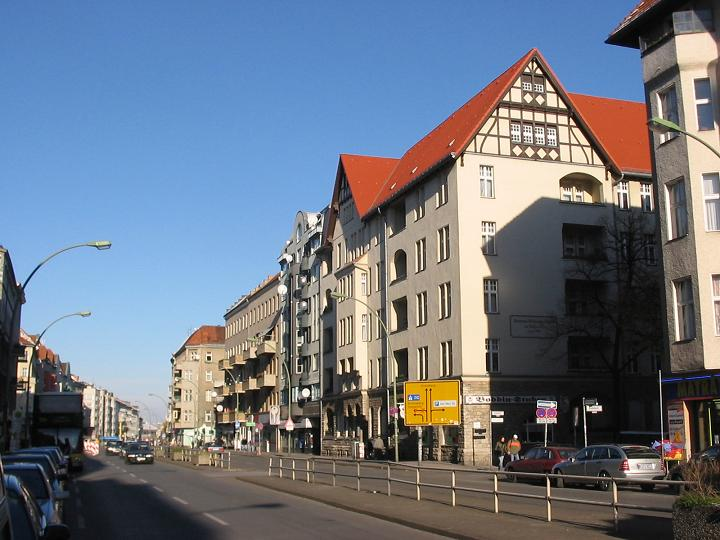
- Hermannstraße corner of Boddinstraße
- Interactive map of Hermannstraße
- Length: 2,490 m (8,170 ft)
- Location: Berlin

Hermannstraße runs southwards for approximately 2.6 kilometers from Hermannplatz in the Neukölln district of Berlin and continues as Britzer Damm after the intersection with Juliusstraße and the new motorway slip road of the Berlin City Ring. Continuing as Buckower Damm towards Großziethen, the road is one of Berlin's historic and major north-south connections. Several neighbourhoods and churchyards define the appearance and structure of this densely built-up residential and commercial street. Designed around 1900 as a middle-class neighbourhood, two of the neighbourhoods are now among Berlin's most socially deprived areas.

== Course on the Teltow Slope ==
In its initial section, Hermannstraße runs parallel to Volkspark Hasenheide, separated only by a small side street. On this gently sloping section, it ascends from the Berlin glacial valley to the Teltowhang, a gently undulating plateau that rises on average 15 meters above central Berlin. The Teltowhang changes direction in Hasenheide from east to south, so Hermannstraße reaches the elevation of the Teltowplatte at the intersection with Flughafenstraße and continues along its slope.

The parallel Neukölln main road, Karl-Marx-Straße, lies at a lower Spreetal level, resulting in sloping cross connections between the two main roads. This geological feature is particularly evident on Rollbergstraße, which descends from the concreted-over former Rollberg. The gradient is significant by Berlin standards: residents of the Rollberg settlement on Hermannstraße once ironically referred to their modest dwellings in this working-class neighbourhood as their "chalets in the Rixdorf Alps".

Separated by the neighbourhood on Schillerpromenade and by Werner-Seelenbinder-Sportpark (formerly Sportpark Neukölln), Hermannstraße runs parallel to the grounds of Tempelhof Airport from Flughafenstraße, located south of Volkspark Hasenheide. In the area south of Leinestraße underground station, Hermannstraße passes six different churchyards, each extending westward towards the airport or eastward towards Karl-Marx-Straße in narrow strips.

The St. Thomas Churchyard closes off the Schillerpromenaden neighbourhood (Schillerkiez for short) to car traffic as far as the airport, creating an island-like location similar to the Schöneberg Rote Insel. The adjacent Warthe neighbourhood is even more isolated, with its southern border formed by the St. Jacobi Churchyard. The neighbourhood around Emser Street, which runs alongside Hermannstraße to the S-Bahn line, is comparatively more open.

== Two Namesakes ==
The previously unnamed street was called Straße nach Britz in 1859. From 1875, it was gradually renamed Hermannstraße from the north, and since 1899, it has borne its current name along its entire length. There are two versions of how it received its name.

=== Arminius ===
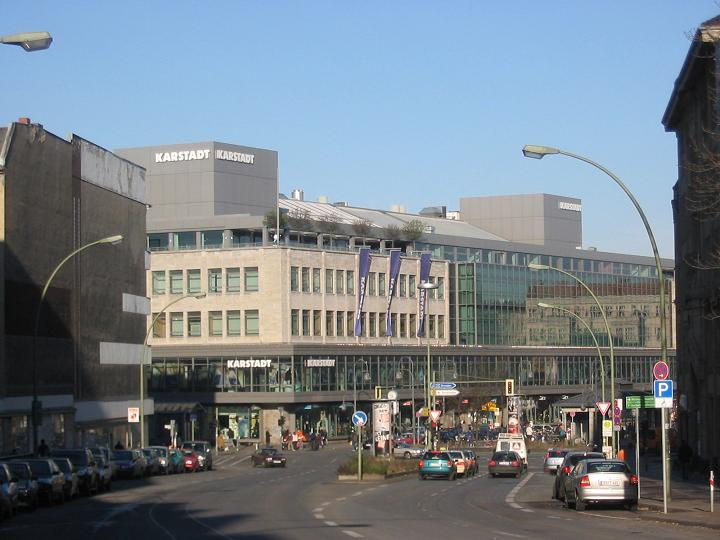
Northern end of Hermannstraße at Hermannplatz

The street is officially named after Hermann the Cheruscan, the name commonly used in 19th-century Germany, marked by patriotism and nationalism, for the Cheruscan prince Arminius. In the year 9, Arminius defeated the Roman legions under Varus in the Battle of the Teutoburg Forest. Only the Latinized form of his name has been recorded, but the translation as Hermann is likely not historical. The mythically glorified Arminius became a significant figure of identification for the young German Empire, most notably commemorated by the Hermann Monument near Detmold, completed in 1875.

=== Hermann Boddin ===
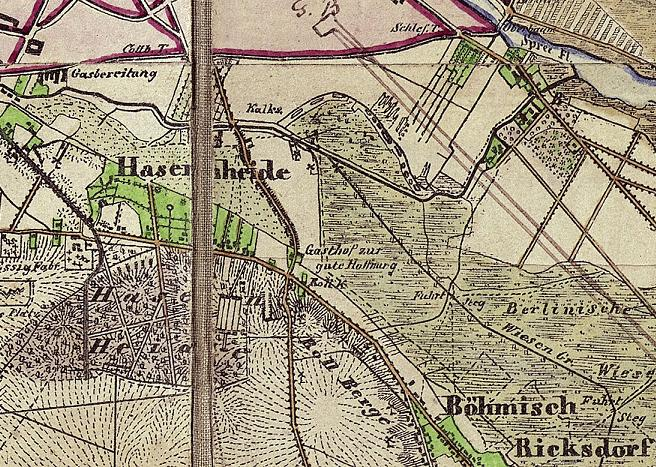
Intersection at Rollkrug and Rollberge in 1842; the red line at the top indicates the city limits at that time.

Throughout much of the Imperial period, Hermann Boddin (1844–1907) was a dominant figure in local politics in Rixdorf, renamed Neukölln in 1912 and incorporated into Berlin in 1920. He served as local council chairman and later mayor. A side street, Boddinstraße, is named after him, along with Boddinplatz, the Boddinstraße underground station, the Hermann-Boddin-Grundschule primary school, a tomb of honor in the state-owned Britz cemetery, and a commemorative plaque. Boddin's influence in Rixdorf led residents to speculate that the naming of Hermannstraße, for whose expansion he campaigned vigorously since taking office in 1874, was intentionally ambiguous, possibly reflecting his prominence.

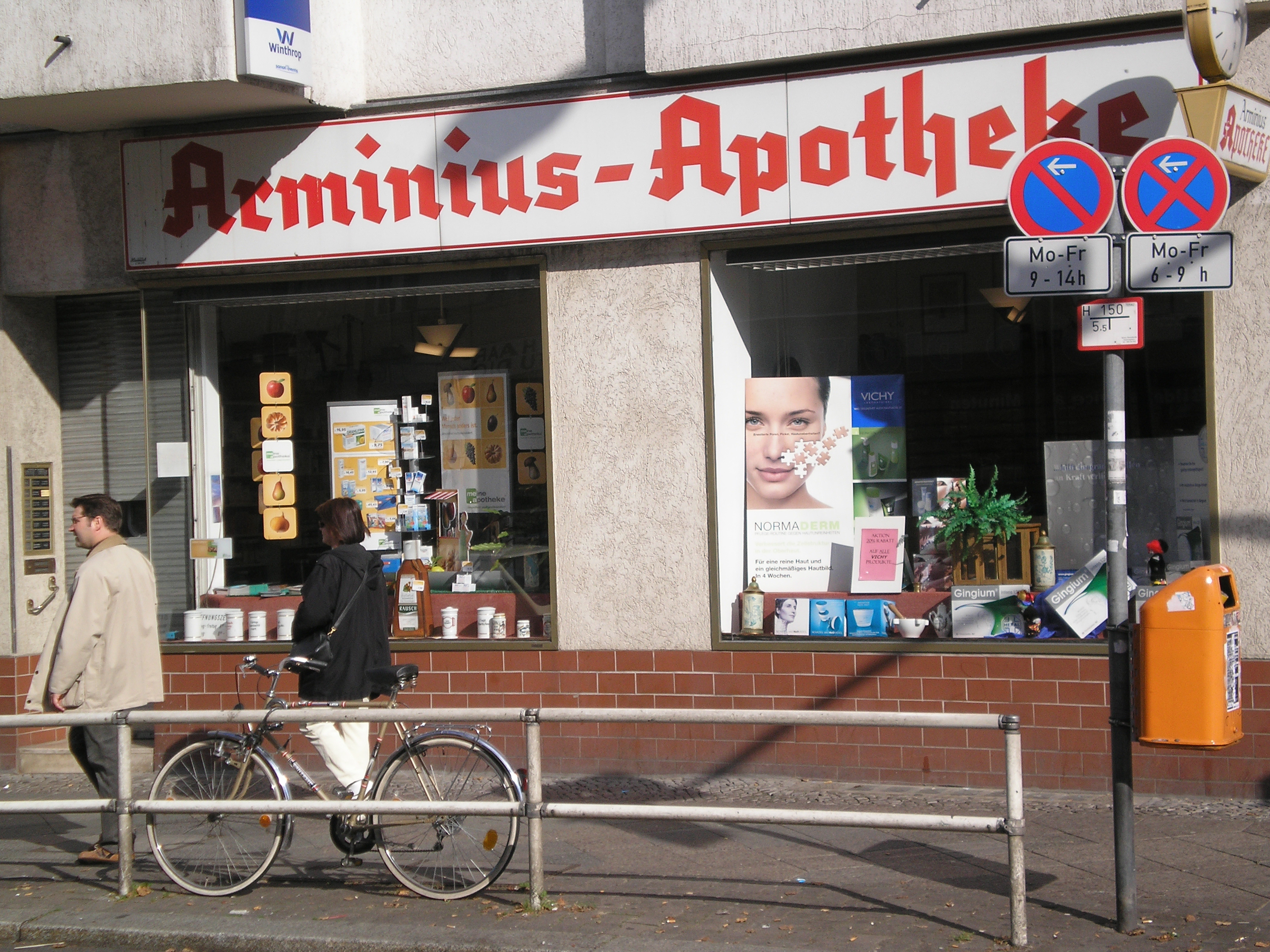
Arminius Pharmacy

Boddin initiated the renaming of Rixdorf to Neukölln to improve its reputation as an entertainment district, a change approved by Emperor Wilhelm II only after Boddin's death. The renaming aimed to make the new district on Schillerpromenade more appealing to higher earners, a project Boddin supported and reportedly profited from financially.

== History ==
=== From the Early Days of Hermannstraße ===
==== Historic Crossroads at Rollkrug ====
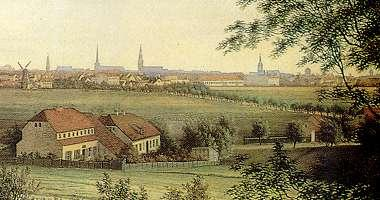
View from the Rollberge hills of the Rollkrug pub on what is now Hermannplatz, far outside the gates of old Berlin, visible in the background. On the right is Dresdener Heerstraße leading to Kottbusser Tor, now Kottbusser Damm.

Long before Hermannstraße was named, its northern starting point featured the historic Rollkrug, located far outside Berlin's city limits south of the Cottbusser Tor. This horse-changing station stood at the crossroads forming Hermannplatz. At that time, the west-south-east connection from Halleschen Tor via Rixdorf to Wusterhausen passed through here, crossing the old north-south connection from Kottbusser Tor to Mittenwalde, which began as Dresdener Heerstraße (today Kottbusser Damm) and continued along today's Hermannstraße, Britzer Damm, and beyond. The Rollkrug existed until 1907 and was replaced by a commercial building housing one of Berlin's prominent cinemas.

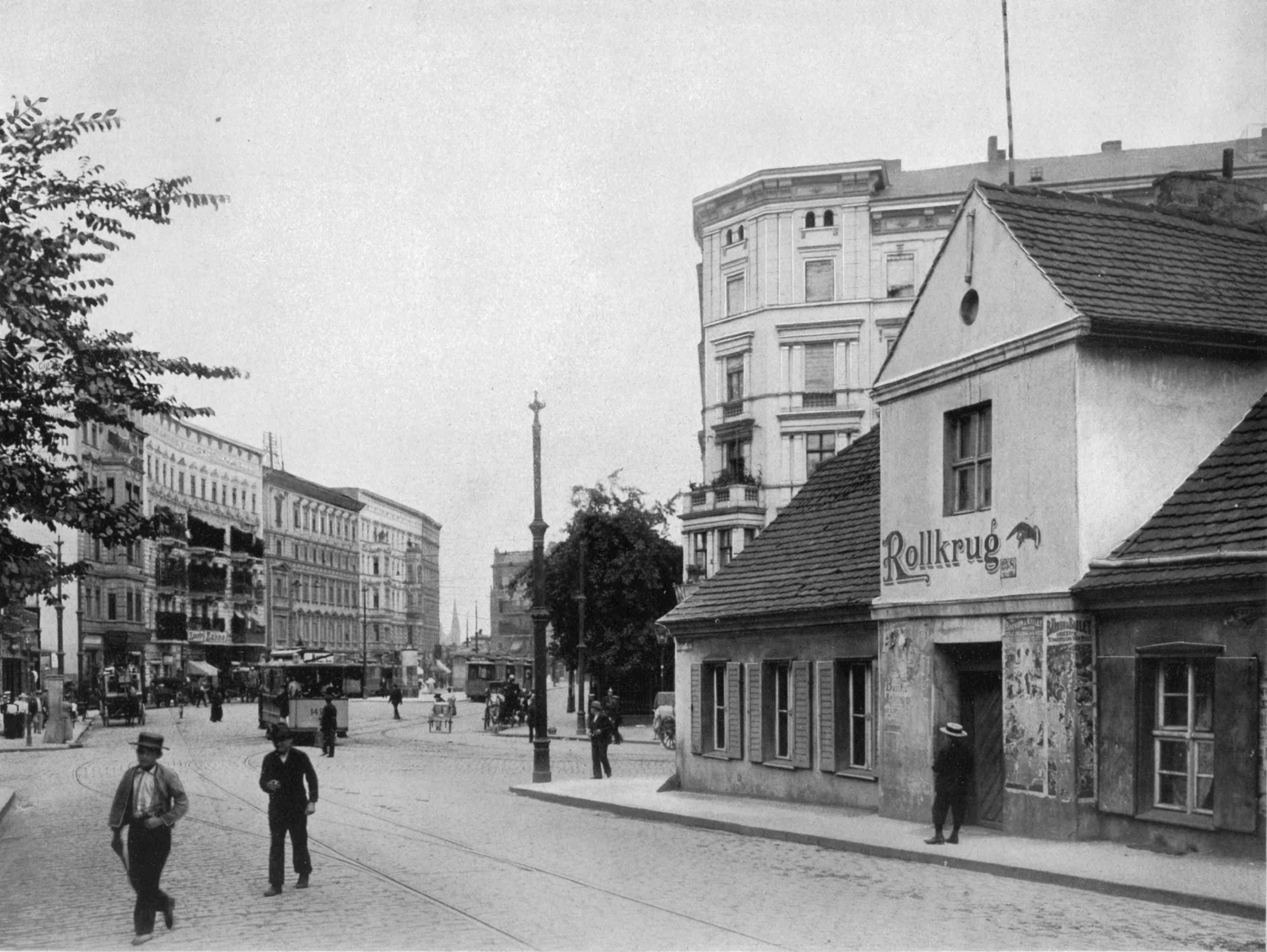
The Rollkrug around 1900 on the corner of Hermannplatz

==== Four Windmills by the Road ====
In the second half of the 19th century, several windmills lined Hermannstraße, including the Hänsche mill, the Rohleder mill on the corner of Leykestraße, and the Fuhrmann mill opposite St. Thomas Churchyard, all post mills. The only Dutch windmill, the Jungfernmühle, stood on Rollberg between 1860 and approximately 1872; it was relocated from Potsdam to Buckow at Goldammerstraße 34, where it remains the only surviving windmill from Hermannstraße.

==== Hermann's Farm ====
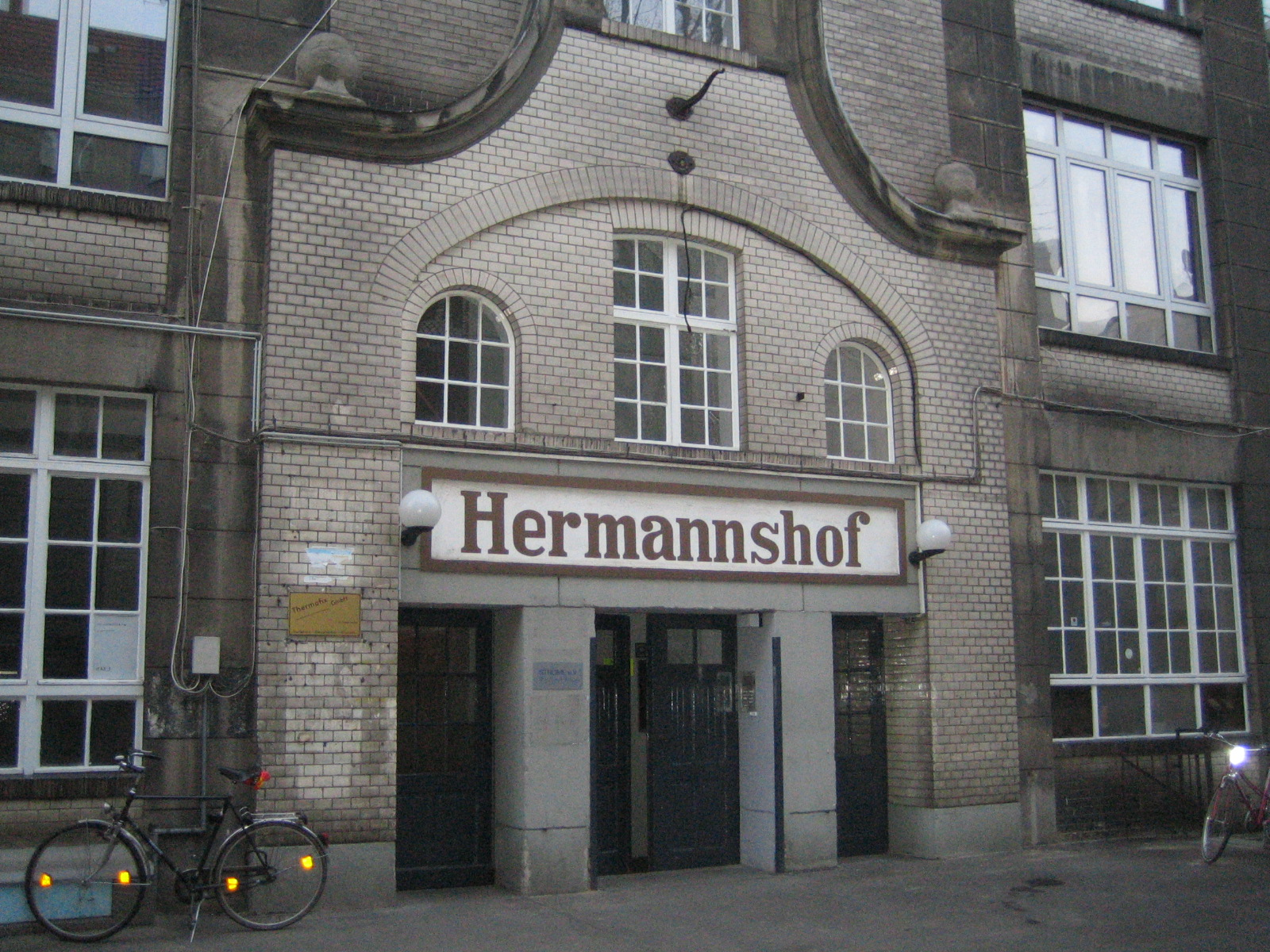
Hermannshof (portal view)

From 1904 to 1905, the Hermannshof was constructed at Hermannstraße 48 in the second rear courtyard to meet the need for commercial spaces, as most residents worked outside the neighbourhood. Unlike typical Rixdorf commercial rear courtyards, the Hermannshof gained recognition similar to the Elisabethhof or Oranienhof in Kreuzberg. Its large, small-paned windows create light-filled rooms, and decorative elements emphasize the central axis and portal, unusual for commercial buildings. The listed building now houses associations, shared flats, and art projects, no longer serving industrial purposes. Concurrently, the Ottilenhof was built at Hermannstraße 56/57 and was fully renovated in 2000.

=== Churchyards and forced labourers ===
==== Unique Concentration ====
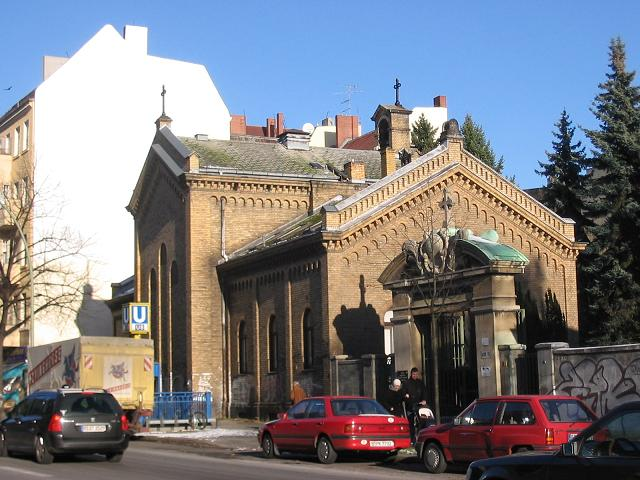
St. Michael's Churchyard, squeezed between the row of houses

The cemeteries were primarily established by communities in the former district of Luisenstadt, mostly located in Kreuzberg rather than Neukölln. During the Gründerzeit, when Berlin's population quadrupled from 500,000 in 1861 to two million in 1910, parishes struggled to find space for gravesites in the cramped city and relocated them outside the city gates. The fields and meadows beyond Cottbusser Tor offered affordable, accessible land along Hermannstraße. The churchyards, established on both sides of the road, feature sloping terrain toward Karl-Marx-Straße due to the former Rollberge hills. Half of the eight cemeteries are protected as garden monuments.

The Protestant St. Jacobi parish established the first cemetery in 1852 near the Rollkrug, the only one in the lower part of the street, located near Karl-Marx-Straße. Unlike the narrow, transverse churchyards in the middle section, it runs parallel to the street for approximately 100 meters, providing a rare green and open space in the densely built-up Hermannstraße neighbourhood.

Around Leinestraße underground station, six narrow, perpendicular churchyards were created in the 1860s and 1870s between Okerstraße and Emser Straße. These burial grounds have short street frontages but extend over 600 meters in depth, characterized by long central avenues with roundabouts and crossroads. Chapels and administrative buildings are typically located at the entrance gates, with occasional sculptures enhancing the avenues' visual depth.

At the southern end, parallel to the new motorway tunnel, the Emmauskirchhof cemetery runs perpendicular to the road, minimally impacting the urban landscape.

==== Confusing Numbering of Hermannstraße and inconsistent naming of cemeteries ====
During construction, the Rixdorf administration adopted the horseshoe numbering system, where the western side, starting from Hermannplatz/Hasenheide, has consecutive numbers, followed by the eastern side in reverse order. By the 1880s, the number reached 171, with many vacant plots listed as construction sites. The cemeteries were initially numbered 73 (Jerusalem and New Church), 77 (Jakobi Parish), and 168. By 1900, parcel numbers reached 258, necessitating reassignment. The cemeteries are now located at: 79–83 (St. Thomas), 84–90 (Jerusalem and New Church), 99–105 (Jacobi Parish), 129–137 (Emmaus Parish), 186–190 (Luisen Churchyard), and 191–195 (St. Michael). The names of the churchyards remain consistent in the 21st century, though inscriptions vary (e.g., the St. Michael Churchyard has multiple designations at its entrance).

==== Northern Area, One Churchyard ====
The St. Jacobi parish laid out this garden monument in 1852 between Hermannstraße and Karl-Marx-Straße, covering 40,908 m². It features a geometric layout with avenues and individual chestnut and lime trees, without decorative areas. Family burial walls line the cemetery wall, and an urn grove was added to the eastern part. The chapel, built between 1911 and 1912 by city planning officer Reinhold Kiehl, is a rectangular plaster building in the ancient Roman style, with putti friezes, pilasters, and a mix of round-arched and square windows. The chapel, administration building, entrance gate, metal spear fence, and Tuscan columns form a cohesive complex, partially restored after wartime damage.

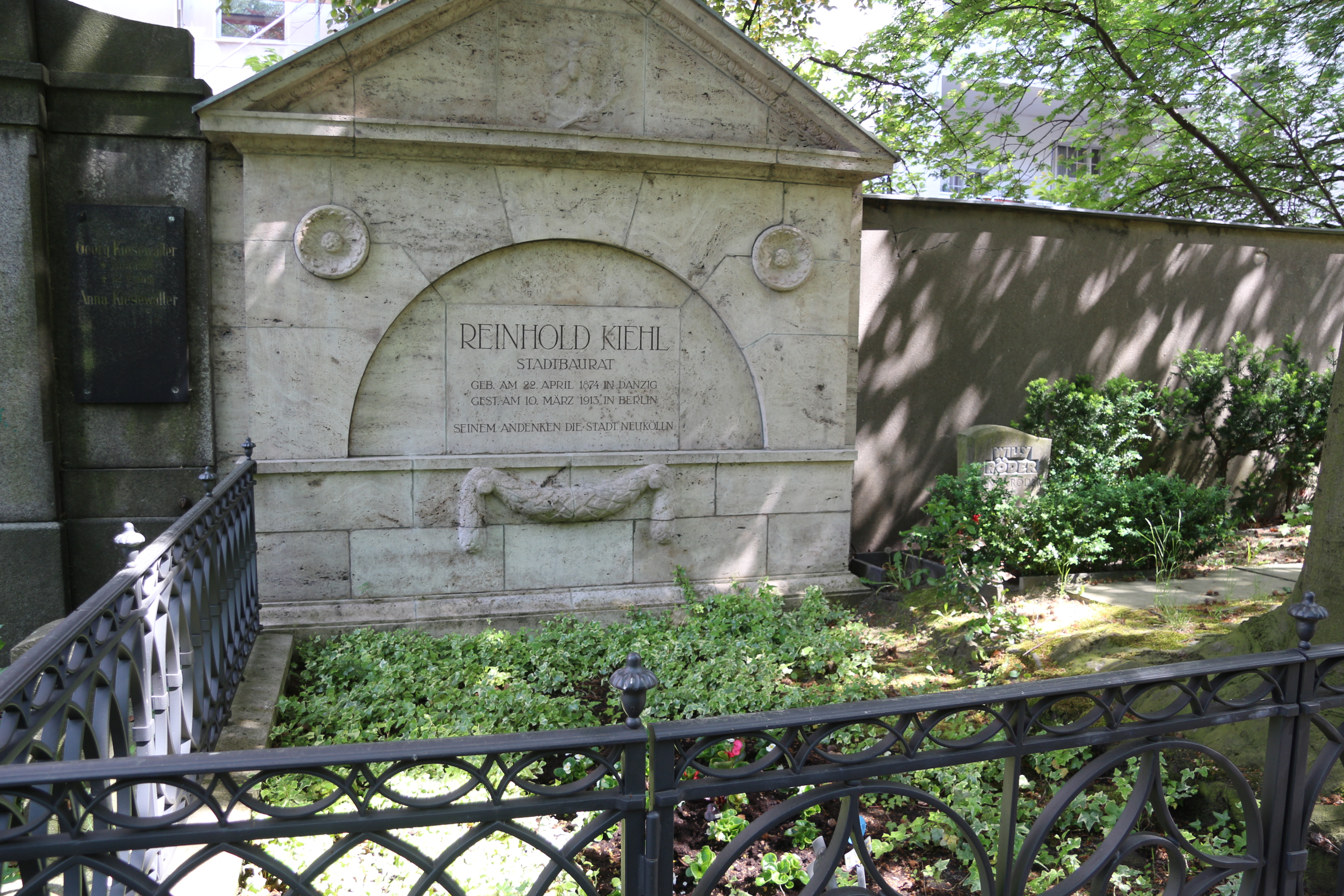
Reinhold Kiehl's grave

Reinhold Kiehl, responsible for listed buildings like Neukölln Town Hall and the former Royal Prussian Building Trade School (now Carl Legien Secondary School), was buried here in 1913, with a tomb inscribed "To his memory, the city of Neukölln." Other notable burials include Indologist Albrecht Weber (1825–1901), painter Franz Skarbina (1849–1910), and fairy tale researcher Johannes Bolte (1858–1937).

==== Cemetery of St. Michael's Parish, Hermannstraße 191–195 (east side) ====
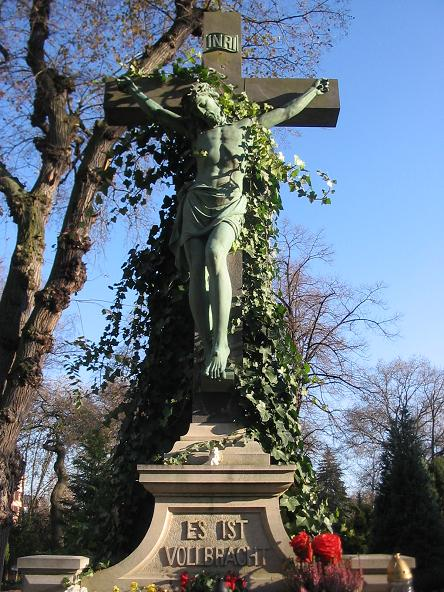
St. Michael's Churchyard, crucifix in the front roundabout

Established between 1863 and 1895, this 21,537 m² churchyard features a central avenue lined with oak and lime trees and three roundabouts, with a prominent crucifix in the front roundabout. The chapel, built in 1884 in the late Romantic style, has a yellow facing brick façade divided into three sections, with a bell tower and a head of Christ on the gable. Expanded in 1912 and restored in 1954 after wartime damage, it includes a mortuary and administration building. A sculpture of Archangel Michael adorns the entrance niche. Burials include former mayors Alfred Rojek and Richard Schönborn, and writer August Scholz.

==== New Cemetery of the Luisenstadt Parish, Hermannstraße 186–190 (east side) ====
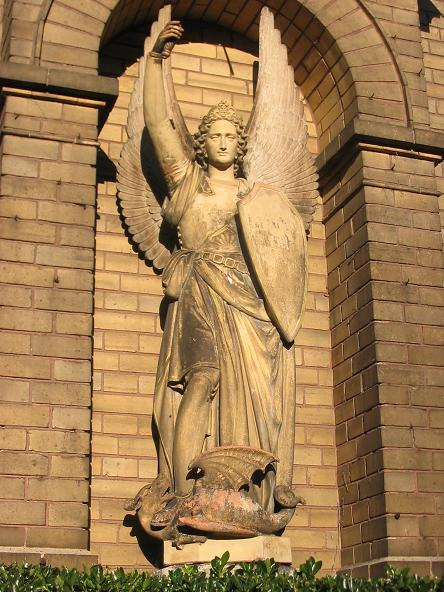
St. Michael's Churchyard, Archangel Michael

Established in 1865, this 47,996 m² cemetery has a main avenue with side avenues, four roundabouts, and lime tree plantings. The chapel, built in 1958/1959 by Paul and Jürgen Emmerich, is a rectangular clinker brick building with a monopitch roof and plaster reliefs, used as a mortuary.

==== Cemetery of St. Thomas Parish I, Hermannstraße 179–185 (east side) ====
Established in 1865, this 51,993 m² garden monument features a central avenue of plane trees, four roundabouts, and transverse avenues with spruce and lime trees. The chapel, designed by Paul Erdmann in 1870, is a brick building with a cross-vaulted ceiling, open sides, and a semicircular altar niche. An octagonal flower house, likely from the 1920s, is notable. Burials include Reinhold "Krücke" Habisch (1889–1964), a Berlin original known for the Sportpalast Waltz, former mayor Robert Zelle, Rixdorf city councillor Gustav Leyke, and city elders Marie and Wilhelm Wagner.

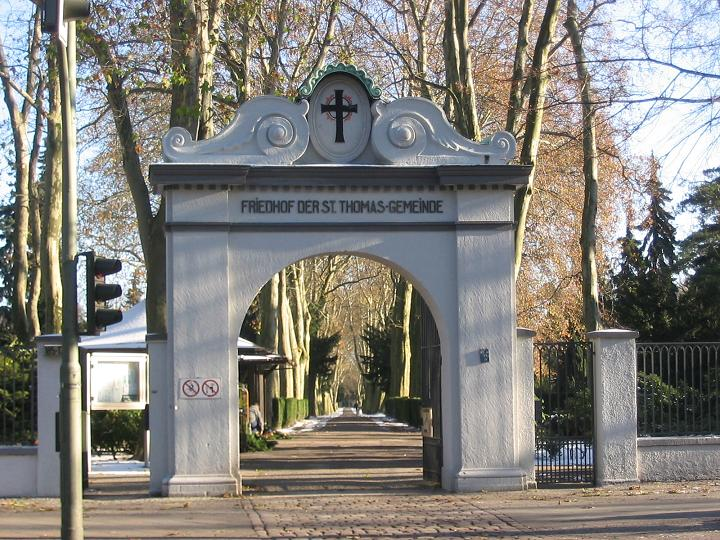
St. Thomas Churchyard at Leinestraße underground station

A memorial pavilion and a memorial stone, moved by 2013 to the St. Thomas Parish II churchyard, commemorate a forced labour camp in the Jerusalem and New Church cemetery (Hermannstraße 84–90). Since December 2019, the urban development company STATTBAU, headquartered at the churchyard's street front, has developed cemetery plans in cooperation with the Berlin Stadtmitte church district.

==== Cemetery of St. Thomas Parish II, Hermannstraße 79–83 (west side) ====
Established in 1872, this 65,697 m² cemetery features a main avenue with plane trees, a roundabout, and pyramidal poplars along the perimeter. Lacking a chapel, it relies on the opposite St. Thomas Parish I chapel. Cleared since 2007, it opened as Anita Berber Park on 10 July 2017. The clinker brick gate and iron bar enclosure are preserved as a monument. The dancer and actress Anita Berber (1899–1928) was buried here, though her grave was removed after the occupancy period expired.

==== Cemetery V of the Jerusalem and New Church, Hermannstraße 84–90 (west side) ====
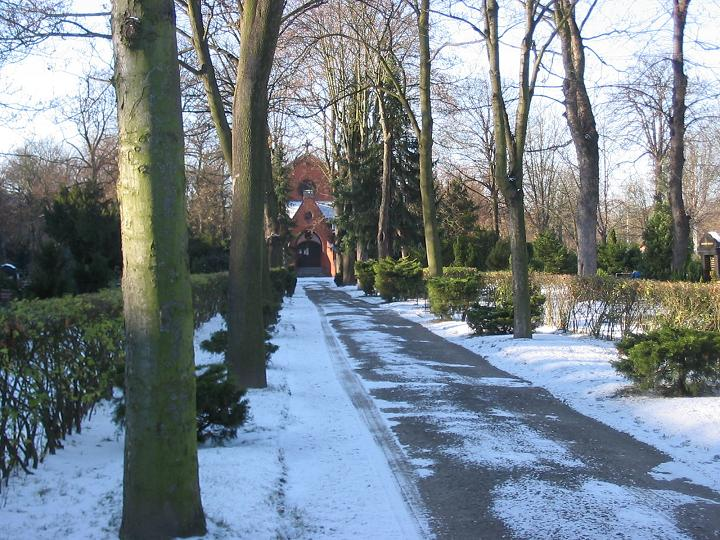
Protestant Cemetery V of the Jerusalem and New Church with a view of the former cemetery chapel, now consecrated as the Bulgarian Orthodox Cathedral Church of St. Tsar Boris the Baptist.

Established between 1870 and 1872, this 56,024 m² cemetery features a linden tree avenue with seven crossroads and several roundabouts. The Gothic-style chapel, built by Louis Arndt in 1899/1900, was rebuilt after wartime damage. In 2002, the Protestant parish in Friedrichstadt leased it to the Bulgarian Orthodox Church, which consecrated it as the Cathedral Church of St. Tsar Boris the Baptist in 2003. The administration building and gate, built in 1873, were converted into a mortuary in 1877. A barrack for forced labourers stood at the western end during the last two years of Second World War, commemorated by a memorial plaque and a memorial stone, moved by 2013 to St. Thomas Parish II.

==== Magic Shop, Hermannstraße 84–90 ====
Barracks on the cemetery grounds housed the Zauberkönig shop since 1952, founded by magician Josef Leichtmann in 1884. After being taken over by an Aryan operator in 1938 due to the Jewish owners' persecution, it relocated to Neukölln post-war. The shop closed in 2018 due to new construction plans, but reopened across the street.

==== New Cemetery of the St. Jacobi Parish, Hermannstraße 99–105 (west side) ====
Established in 1867, this 74,048 m² cemetery features a lime tree avenue, roundabouts, and five crossroads. The Romantic-style chapel, of unknown date and architect, has a yellow brick façade and was rebuilt in 1952 after wartime damage. The grave of theologian Bruno Bauer (1809–1882), criticized by Karl Marx and Friedrich Engels, is located here. Theodor Fontane's novel Irrungen, Wirrungen mentions this cemetery in chapters 21 and 22.

==== Cemetery of the Emmaus Parish, Hermannstraße 129–137 (west side) ====
The Emmauskirchhof, established in 1888, is the largest Hermannstraße cemetery at 128,781 m². The chapel, built around 1900 in a transitional Romantic-Gothic style, features a red brick and grey plaster façade, a roof turret, and a three-nave interior with Romanesque capitals. Walter Bromme (1885–1943), composer of operettas, is buried here.

==== Forced Labour Camp in the Churchyard of the Jerusalem and New Church ====
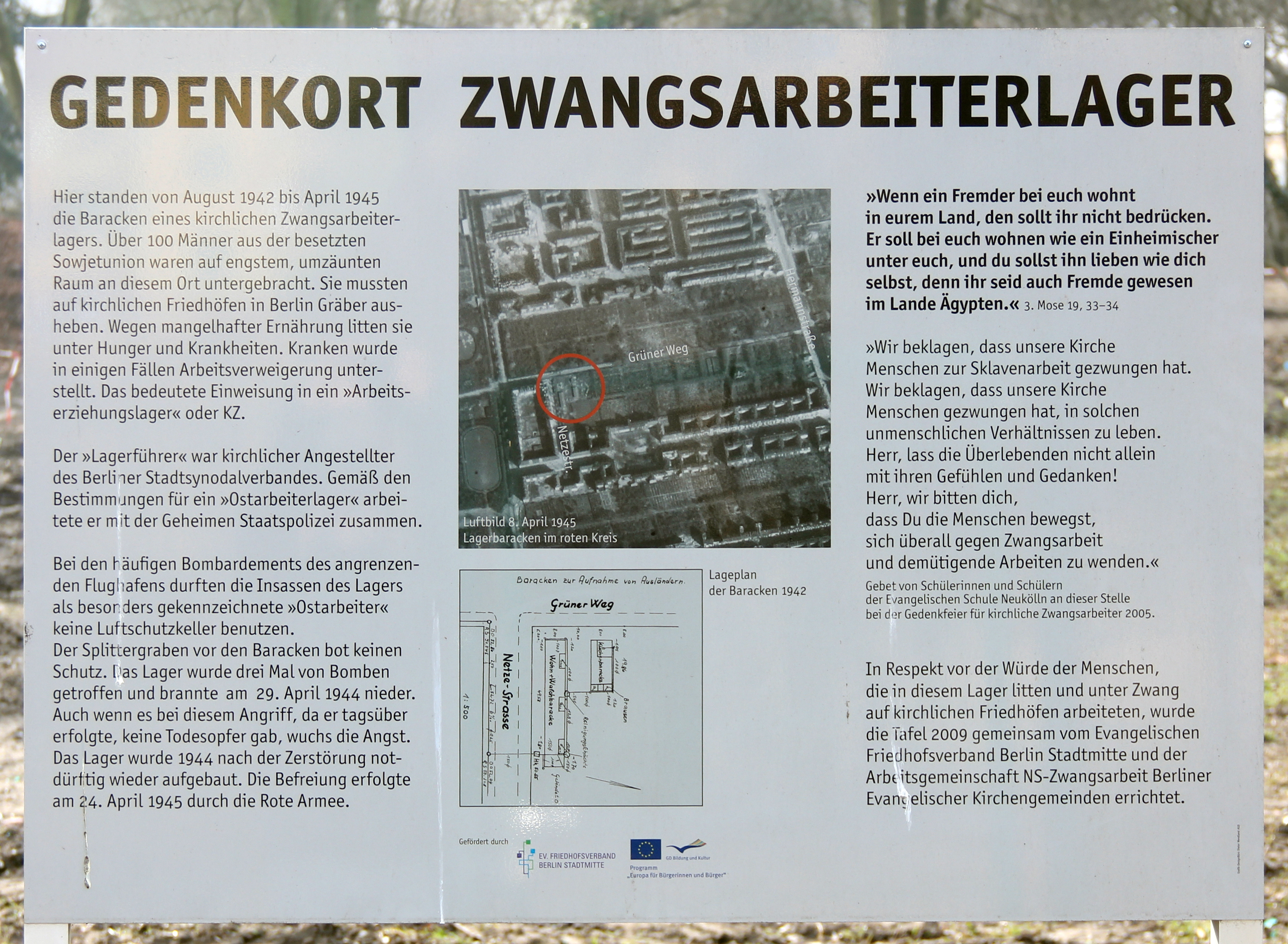
Commemorative plaque, Netzestraße 1, in Berlin-Neukölln

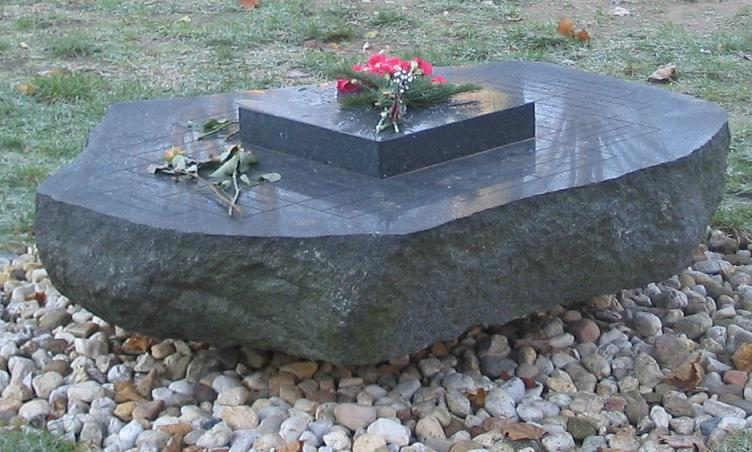
Memorial stone for the forced labourers

During the last three years of the Second World War, a barracks camp for approximately 100 forced labourers, mainly Russian and Ukrainian, operated in the Jerusalem and New Church cemetery (Hermannstraße 84–90). These workers maintained graves and buried bomb victims. The camp, recognized as "important for the war effort," was managed by Gustav Weniger of the Confessing Church. The Evangelical Church in Germany has acknowledged its role and contributed to compensation payments. Wasyl Timofejewitsch Kudrenko's 2005 diary describes the camp's horrors, including bomb damage and lack of shelter. A memorial stone by Rainer Fest, unveiled in 2002, and an information pillar, both later moved to St. Thomas Parish II, commemorate the 96 known forced labourers.

=== Other forced labour camps ===
Eight additional forced labour camps existed along Hermannstraße:

- Hermannstraße 27: Listed in a Belgian catalogue.
- Hermannstraße 110: Run by Mix & Genest for Belgians, French, Croats, and Serbs; also housed "Lager Otto Nettelbeck" in March 1945.
- Hermannstraße 111: Reichsbahn warehouse from 1939.
- Hermannstraße 159: Run by Gaubschat GmbH for various nationals.
- Hermannstraße 159a: Run by Adam Opel AG for Dutch, French, and Czech nationals from 1943.
- Hermannstraße 200: Housed Dutch nationals from February 1943.
- Hermannstraße 216–219: Likely run by Kindl Brewery for French and Eastern European female workers.

== Traffic ==
=== Public transport ===
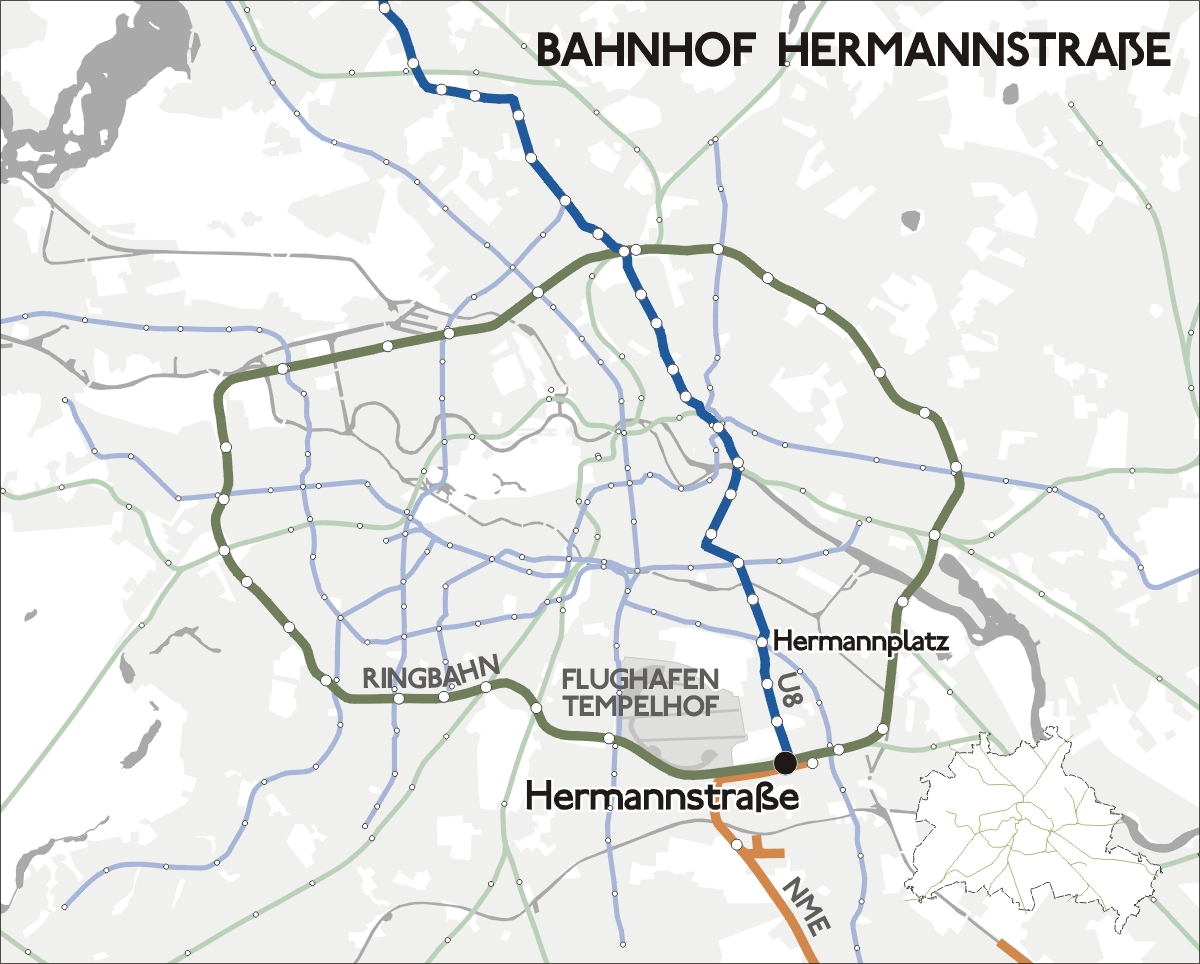
Location of Hermannstraße station

The Poststraße Berlin–Mittenwalde–Dresden, inaugurated in 1712, followed the route of modern Hermannstraße. On 13 June 1885, Rixdorf opened a horse-drawn tram line from Hermannplatz to the corner of Hermannstraße and Knesebeckstraße (now Silbersteinstraße), operated by the Große Berliner Pferde-Eisenbahn. The U8 underground line runs under the street, serving Hermannplatz, Boddinstraße, Leinestraße, and the terminus at Hermannstraße, opened in 1996, approximately 500 meters before Britzer Damm. The Ringbahn crosses at S-Bahn station Hermannstraße, operational since 1899, initially with steam trains and electrified from 1928. The Neukölln-Mittenwalder Eisenbahn, connected at Hermannstraße station from 1900, discontinued passenger service in 1955 but continues freight operations.

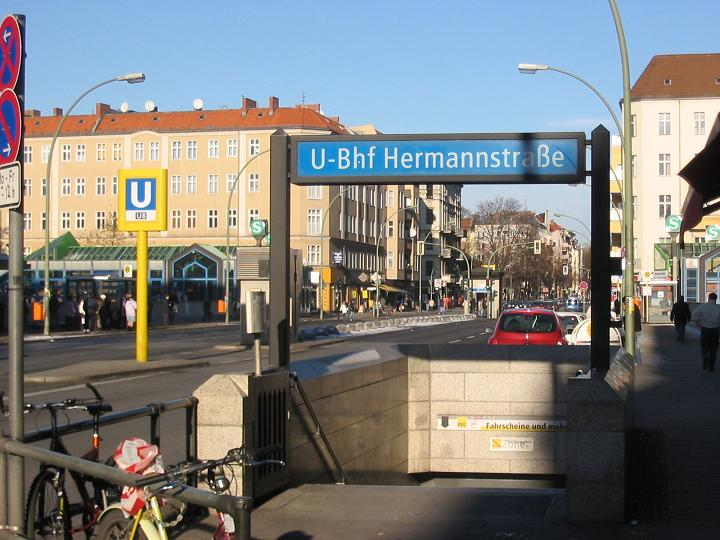
Entrance to Hermannstraße underground station

=== Private transport ===
==== Car traffic ====
Despite integration into Berlin's public transport, Hermannstraße struggles to accommodate traffic due to dense development, making expansion difficult. The 2000 connection to the Berlin city ring road via Britzer Damm reduced through traffic, but challenges persist: Two traffic lanes per direction with parking lanes are interrupted by traffic islands for underground stations and bus stops. Numerous side streets have slow left and right turns due to pedestrian crossings. Frequent traffic lights and double-parking by residents and delivery drivers create stop-and-go traffic, causing noise pollution and high pollutant concentrations.

==== Cycling ====
Hermannstraße's cycle paths are inadequate and narrow between Hermannplatz and Boddinstraße; elsewhere, cyclists share the road. An alternative route avoids Hermannstraße, running through neighbourhoods near Tempelhof Airport to Columbiadamm, offering a scenic, motor-traffic-free path. From Britzer Damm’s cycle path, the route uses the green space above the Ortskern Britz tunnel, Eschersheimer Straße, Oderstraße, and paths near the Neukölln sports park and Werner Seelenbinder memorial, connecting to Columbiadamm and Volkspark Hasenheide.

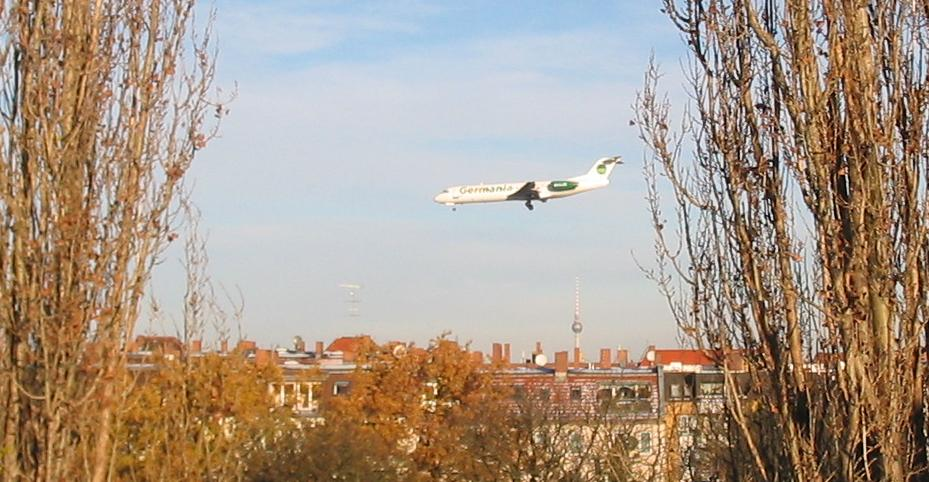
Approach path, view over St. Jacobi churchyard

In March 2019, plans for a protected cycle path were finalized, with construction planned for 2020, starting in the southern section to avoid congestion from Karl-Marx-Straße's reconstruction. In 2020, pop-up cycle lanes were introduced citywide due to the COVID-19 pandemic, sparking debate. The "Hermannstraße für Alle" initiative collected 2,000 signatures for a residents' petition, and on 23 September 2020, the district council approved a 30 km/h speed limit and plans for a continuous protected cycle path, rejected by the Senate but supported by a coalition for implementation by winter 2021.

== See also ==
- Hermannplatz
- Mainzer Straße (Berlin-Neukölln)
