= Mittenwalde =

- Town
- Flag Coat of arms

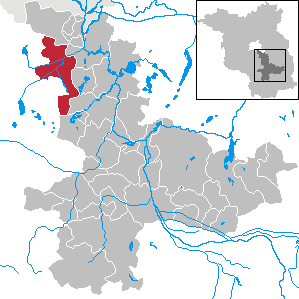
- Location of Mittenwalde within Dahme-Spreewald district
- Interactive map of Mittenwalde
- Location within Germany Location within Brandenburg
- Coordinates: 52°16′N 13°32′E
- Country: Germany
- State: Brandenburg
- District: Dahme-Spreewald
- Subdivisions: 6 Ortsteile

Government
  - Mayor (2016–24): Maja Buße (CDU)

Area
  - Total: 98.48 km^{2} (38.02 sq mi)
- Elevation: 37 m (121 ft)

Population (2025-12-31)
  - Total: 9,977
  - Density: 101.3/km^{2} (262.4/sq mi)
- Time zone: UTC+01:00 (CET)
  - Summer (DST): UTC+02:00 (CEST)
- Postal codes: 15749
- Dialling codes: 033764
- Vehicle registration: LDS
- Website: www.mittenwalde.de

Mittenwalde (German pronunciation: [mɪtn̩ˈvaldə]) is a town in the Dahme-Spreewald district, in Brandenburg, Germany. It is situated 30 km southeast of Berlin (centre).

On May 28, 1562, the town of Mittenwalde lent Berlin 400 guilders, a debt which has never been repaid, though the town has attempted to collect the debt on rare occasions. As of 2020, this debt would be equivalent to about 113.92 million euros ($127.05 million) with simple interest, but with compound interest, the debt would be 43.58 quintillion euros, far larger than the global economy.

== Demography ==
Development of Population since 1875 within the Current Boundaries (Blue Line: Population; Dotted Line: Comparison to Population Development of Brandenburg state; Grey Background: Time of Nazi rule; Red Background: Time of Communist rule)

Recent Population Development and Projections (Population Development before Census 2011 (blue line); Recent Population Development according to the Census in Germany in 2011 (blue bordered line); Official projections for 2005-2030 (yellow line); for 2020-2030 (green line); for 2017-2030 (scarlet line)

Mittenwalde: Population development
within the current boundaries (2020)

Year	Pop.	±% p.a.
1875	5,207	—
1890	6,869	+1.86%
1910	8,071	+0.81%
1925	7,902	−0.14%
1933	7,854	−0.08%
1939	9,461	+3.15%
1946	9,028	−0.67%
1950	9,076	+0.13%
1964	7,411	−1.44%
1971	7,195	−0.42%
1981	6,224	−1.44%
1985	6,064	−0.65%
1989	5,800	−1.11%
1990	5,697	−1.78%
1991	5,584	−1.98%

Year	Pop.	±% p.a.
1992	5,587	+0.05%
1993	5,576	−0.20%
1994	5,937	+6.47%
1995	6,522	+9.85%
1996	7,071	+8.42%
1997	7,589	+7.33%
1998	7,877	+3.79%
1999	8,220	+4.35%
2000	8,410	+2.31%
2001	8,536	+1.50%
2002	8,547	+0.13%
2003	8,640	+1.09%
2004	8,699	+0.68%
2005	8,664	−0.40%
2006	8,684	+0.23%

Year	Pop.	±% p.a.
2007	8,663	−0.24%
2008	8,683	+0.23%
2009	8,710	+0.31%
2010	8,724	+0.16%
2011	8,658	−0.76%
2012	8,663	+0.06%
2013	8,734	+0.82%
2014	8,774	+0.46%
2015	8,898	+1.41%
2016	8,950	+0.58%
2017	9,104	+1.72%
2018	9,140	+0.40%
2019	9,269	+1.41%
2020	9,428	+1.72%
