= Volkspark Hasenheide =

Berlin park

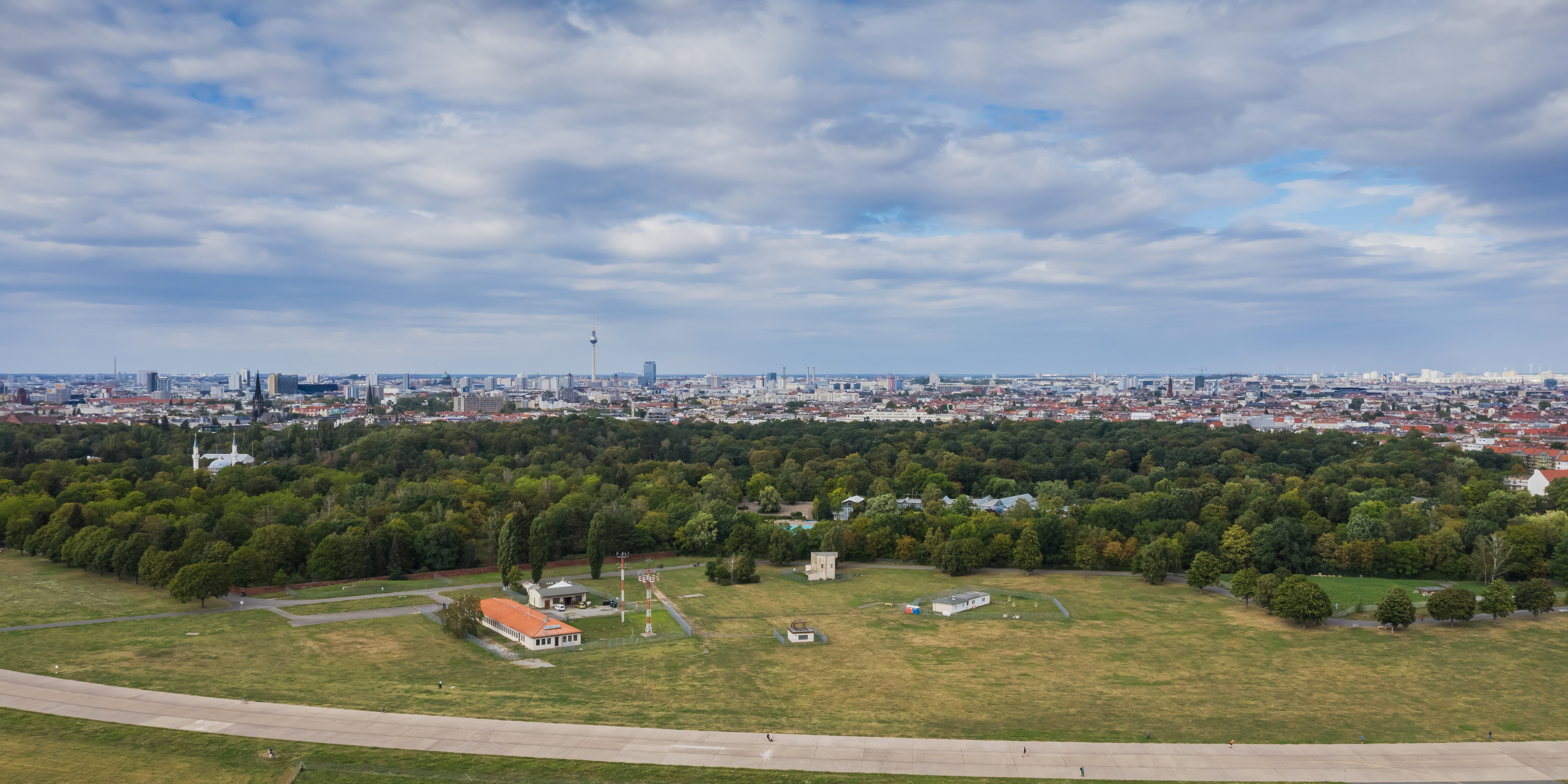
- Aerial view

- Location within Berlin
- Type: Urban park
- Location: Neukölln (quarter), Neukölln (borough), Berlin
- Coordinates: 52°29′13″N 13°24′59″E
- Created: 1936-1939
- Status: Open year-round

The Volkspark Hasenheide is a park of around fifty hectares in the Berlin quarter of Neukölln on the border with Kreuzberg. The name of the park goes back to the use of the area as a rabbit enclosure from 1678. The Great Elector, Frederick William, hunted there.

== History ==
Long before the planning for Hasenheide as a park, there was a cemetery located there. Originating in 1798, it was the first Muslim burial place near Berlin. Turks who died in Berlin were buried there.

The first Turnplatz, or open-air gymnasium, was opened here by Friederich Ludwig Jahn, in 1811. However, the impressive wooden exercise structures were taken down in 1819 because of political turmoil.

In 1904, Hasenheide was transferred from the then Teltow district to Rixdorf. As early as the 1920s, there were plans to turn the area, with its old trees, into a public park. Construction began 1936, only after the monument to the father of the German gymnastics movement, Friederich Ludwig Jahn, was moved to a new location. By 1939, only an eastern section of the park had been completed. In the same year, the city of Berlin purchased around 26 hectares of Hasenheide for 522,987 Marks.

During the Second World War, there were plans to build a pair of flak towers in Hasenheide. They were meant to be the fourth pair, adding to the existing ones in the Tiergarten, Volkspark Friedrichshain and Volkspark Humboldthain. However, they were never built.

After the end of the Second World War, 700,000 m^{3} of rubble were used to create a hill in the western part of Hasenheide called the Rixdorfer Höhe (en: Rixdorf Height). It towers around the surrounding area, reaching a height of 68 metres (223 ft) above sea level. Until around 1950, the US Army used the area as a shooting range.

The area was again planned as a park and opened as such on June 7, 1954. The shooting range was removed and the area was landscaped according to the plans of Neukölln gardening authority, Kurt Pöthig.

Founded in 2009, the park now has a tree nature trail with trees of the year. Each year a new tree is added to expand the trail.

== Other issues ==
The Hasenheide is a focus of the Berlin drug trade (especially with cannabis as an intoxicant). However, the Berlin police, which investigates concrete indications and complaints from the population to combat drug trafficking, point out that a complete suppression of cannabis trafficking would cause migration to surrounding, poorly controllable areas.

On the 17 March 2006, a 42-year-old police chief was shot at the Hasenheide while trying to hire two street robbers who had stolen an old woman's handbag with 50 euros. One of the robbers immediately drew a pistol and fired at the policeman until the magazine was empty. The two perpetrators were later arrested and the shooter sentenced to life imprisonment. In 2015, the body of a stabbed 28-year-old was found. In 2021, two men beat a 17-year-old to death. In 2022, a 25-year-old man was stabbed. However, in 2022, the Hasenheide was no longer listed as a so-called crime-laden place as it used to be.

== Future projects ==
On 4 November 2007 was held in a four-hour ritual celebration by the sponsoring association Sri Ganesha Hindu Tempel e. V. in the Volkspark laid the foundation stone for the Sri-Ganesha Hindu-Temple Berlin, which is to serve as an intercultural meeting place. On 20. January 2009, the Neukölln City Planning Office granted the building permit. The temple is currently under construction.

== Activities ==
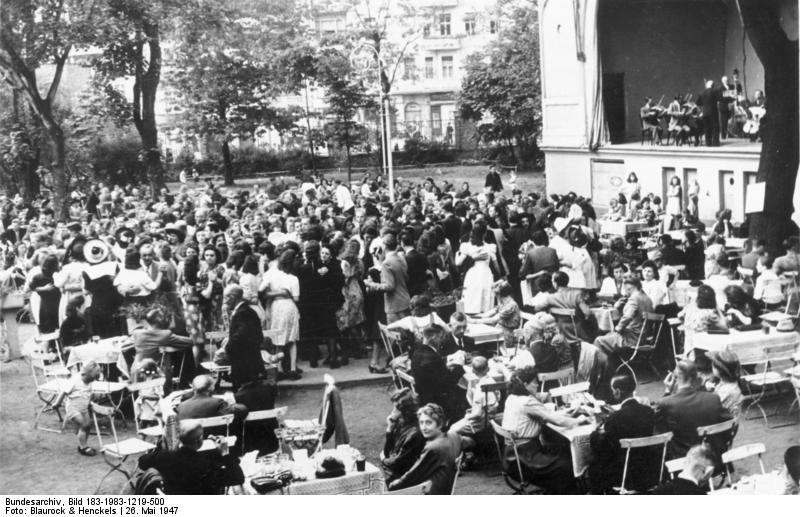
Dance event held in Hasenheide in 1947

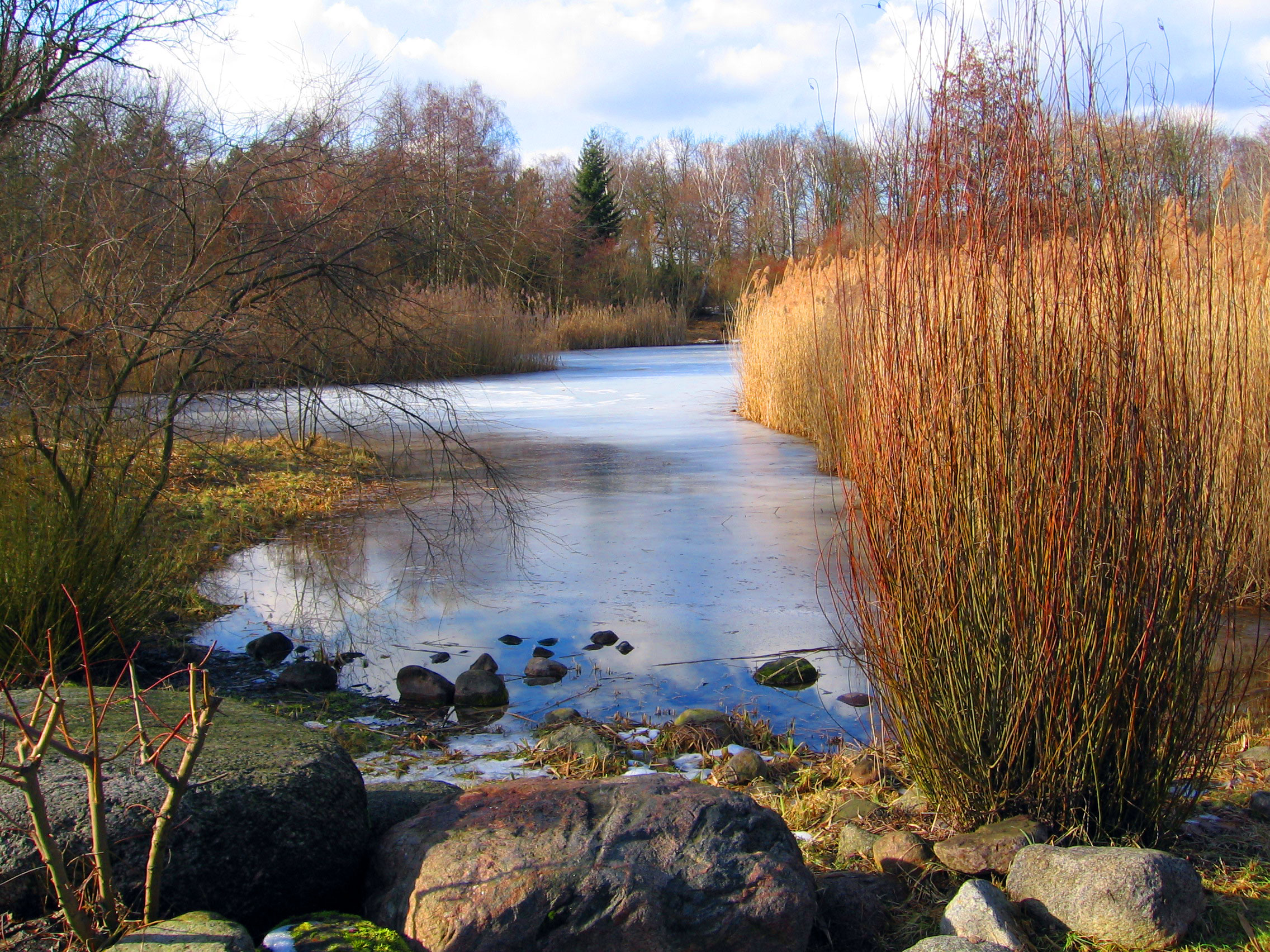
Lake in Hasenheide Park, 2006

Today, the park has an open-air cinema, an animal enclosure, a mini golf course, a rose garden, several playgrounds and a dog park. In the middle of the park is a 1950s-style kiosk called Hasenschänke.

According to the official city website berlin.de, some parts of the park resemble a drug bazaar.
